= 2011 Basingstoke and Deane Borough Council election =

2011 UK local government election

← 2010	5 May 2011	2012 →

20 of 60 seats to Basingstoke and Deane Borough Council 31 seats needed for a majority
- Turnout: 45%
	First party	Second party
Party	Conservative	Labour
Seats won	34	11
Seat change	Steady	2
Popular vote	23,607	10,489
Percentage	54.0%	24.0%
	Third party	Fourth party
Party	Liberal Democrats	Independent
Seats won	13	2
Seat change	-2	Steady
Popular vote	7,937	1,335
Percentage	18.1%	3.1%
Council control before election
Conservative Party (UK)
Council control after election
Conservative Party (UK)

The 2011 Basingstoke and Deane Council election took place on 5 May 2011 to elect members of Basingstoke and Deane Borough Council in Hampshire, England. One third of the council was up for election and the Conservative Party stayed in overall control of the council.

== Election result ==
The election had 21 seats being contested, with the contest in Popley East being a by-election after Mary Brian resigned from the council. The Conservatives remained in control of the council with 34 seats, while Labour gained 2 seats to have 11 councillors. Meanwhile, the Liberal Democrats lost one seat, but remained the second largest group with 13 seats. Independents stayed on 2 seats, while the Basingstoke First Community Party lost its only seat on the council. Overall turnout in the election was 45%.

Labour narrowly gained the seat of Brighton Hill North from the Liberal Democrats and took South Ham from the Conservatives. However the Conservatives won Hatch Warren and Beggarwood, where the previous councillor, Phil Heath from the Basingstoke First Community Party, had stood down at the election. The winner in Hatch Warren and Beggarwood, Conservative Rebecca Bean, became the youngest councillor at the age of 24. There were also close results in Baughurst and Tadley North, and Winklebury, with the Conservatives holding both seats over the Liberal Democrat and Labour parties respectively. Meanwhile, independent Martin Biermann held his seat in Chineham with 1,335 votes, compared to 1,252 votes for Conservative John Downes.

After the election, the composition of the council was:

- Conservative 34
- Liberal Democrats 13
- Labour 11
- Independent 2

Basingstoke and Deane local election result 2011
Party	Seats	Gains	Losses	Net gain/loss	Seats %	Votes %	Votes	+/−
Conservative	13	1	1	0	61.9	54.0	23,607	+7.2
Labour	4	2	0	+2	19.0	24.0	10,489	+6.7
Liberal Democrats	3	0	1	-1	14.3	18.1	7,937	-12.4
Independent	1	0	0	0	4.8	3.1	1,335	+0.5
UKIP	0	0	0	0	0.0	0.8	371	+0.2
Basingstoke First Community Party	0	0	1	-1	0.0	0.0	0	-1.9

== Ward results ==
Basing
Party	Candidate	Votes	%	±%
Conservative	Stephen Marks	2,325	70.5	+4.8
Liberal Democrats	Emily Lawrence	524	15.9	−7.8
Labour	Leslie Clarke	448	13.6	+3.0
Majority		1,801	54.6	+12.6
Turnout		3,297	50	−25
Conservative hold		Swing		

Baughurst and Tadley North
Party	Candidate	Votes	%	±%
Conservative	Graham Round	930	44.7	
Liberal Democrats	Warwick Lovegrove	900	43.3	
Labour	David Carr	249	12.0	
Majority		30	1.4	
Turnout		2,079	51	+10
Conservative hold		Swing		

Bramley and Sherfield
Party	Candidate	Votes	%	±%
Conservative	Ranil Jayawardena	1,324	66.2	
Liberal Democrats	Janice Spalding	385	19.2	
Labour	Stephen Rothman	292	14.6	
Majority		939	47.0	
Turnout		2,001	48	+9
Conservative hold		Swing		

Brighton Hill North
Party	Candidate	Votes	%	±%
Labour	Carolyn Wooldridge	579	36.9	+20.8
Liberal Democrats	Thomas Mitchell	536	34.2	−20.9
Conservative	Marc Wheelhouse	454	28.9	+0.1
Majority		43	2.7	
Turnout		1,569	40	−23
Labour gain from Liberal Democrats		Swing		

Burghclere, Highclere and St Mary Bourne
Party	Candidate	Votes	%	±%
Conservative	John Izett	1,563	69.9	+4.3
Liberal Democrats	Anthony Davies	305	13.6	−11.9
Labour	Romilla Wickremeratne	228	10.2	+10.2
UKIP	Emily Blatchford	139	6.2	+0.3
Majority		1,258	56.3	+19.2
Turnout		2,235	51	−23
Conservative hold		Swing		

Chineham
Party	Candidate	Votes	%	±%
Independent	Martin Biermann	1,335	46.6	+38.0
Conservative	John Downes	1,252	43.7	−15.6
Labour	Simon Broad	275	9.6	−4.8
Majority		83	2.9	
Turnout		2,862	43	−28
Independent hold		Swing		

Eastrop
Party	Candidate	Votes	%	±%
Liberal Democrats	Stuart Parker	791	54.1	+3.3
Conservative	Katie Black	421	28.8	−3.4
Labour	Philip Courtenay	251	17.2	+0.3
Majority		370	25.3	+6.7
Turnout		1,463	38	−22
Liberal Democrats hold		Swing		

Grove
Party	Candidate	Votes	%	±%
Liberal Democrats	Ronald Hussey	1,238	58.7	+3.2
Conservative	Penny Bates	634	30.1	−3.9
Labour	Nigel Wooldridge	237	11.2	+0.7
Majority		604	28.6	+7.1
Turnout		2,109	46	−23
Liberal Democrats hold		Swing		

Hatch Warren and Beggarwood
Party	Candidate	Votes	%	±%
Conservative	Rebecca Bean	1,754	68.8	+10.7
Labour	Carl Reader	403	15.8	+15.8
Liberal Democrats	Ruth Day	394	15.4	−14.4
Majority		1,351	53.0	+24.7
Turnout		2,551	39	−31
Conservative gain from Basingstoke First Community Party				

Kempshott
Party	Candidate	Votes	%	±%
Conservative	Rita Burgess	1,855	68.0	+12.6
Labour	Walter McCormick	584	21.4	+7.5
Liberal Democrats	Stephen Whitechurch	289	10.6	−8.4
Majority		1,271	46.6	+10.2
Turnout		2,728	49	−32
Conservative hold		Swing		

Kingsclere
Party	Candidate	Votes	%	±%
Conservative	Donald Sherlock	1,366	72.6	
Labour	James Gibb	516	27.4	
Majority		850	45.2	
Turnout		1,882	48	+7
Conservative hold		Swing		

Norden
Party	Candidate	Votes	%	±%
Labour	George Hood	1,328	60.9	+14.8
Conservative	Jim Holder	642	29.4	−3.4
Liberal Democrats	Richard Whitechurch	211	9.7	−11.3
Majority		686	31.5	+18.2
Turnout		2,181	36	−24
Labour hold		Swing		

Oakley and North Waltham
Party	Candidate	Votes	%	±%
Conservative	Rob Golding	2,017	69.3	+7.9
Labour	Barnaby Wheller	514	17.7	+5.5
Liberal Democrats	Robert Cooper	378	13.0	−13.4
Majority		1,503	51.7	+16.8
Turnout		2,909	53	−22
Conservative hold		Swing		

Overton, Laverstoke and Steventon
Party	Candidate	Votes	%	±%
Liberal Democrats	Paula Baker	852	41.2	+17.1
Conservative	Lyn Hardy	630	30.4	+1.6
Labour	Colin Phillimore	497	24.0	+24.0
UKIP	George Garton	91	4.4	+4.4
Majority		222	10.8	
Turnout		2,070	54	−19
Liberal Democrats hold		Swing		

Pamber and Silchester
Party	Candidate	Votes	%	±%
Conservative	Marilyn Tucker	1,507	78.7	
Labour	Terry Price	407	21.3	
Majority		1,100	57.4	
Turnout		1,914	53	+9
Conservative hold		Swing		

Popley East
Party	Candidate	Votes	%	±%
Labour	Shelley Phelps	829	67.0	+19.1
Conservative	Paul Watts	309	25.0	−6.0
Liberal Democrats	Liam Elvish	99	8.0	−13.1
Majority		520	42.0	+25.0
Turnout		1,237	34	−22
Labour hold		Swing		

South Ham
Party	Candidate	Votes	%	±%
Labour	Gary Watts	1,359	54.0	+14.8
Conservative	Rebecca Sanders	852	33.8	−2.7
Liberal Democrats	Madeline Hussey	307	12.2	−12.1
Majority		507	20.1	+17.4
Turnout		2,518	39	−23
Labour gain from Conservative		Swing		

Tadley Central
Party	Candidate	Votes	%	±%
Conservative	Stephen West	609	59.3	+5.0
Liberal Democrats	Jo Slimin	321	31.3	−11.2
Labour	Stanley Howes	97	9.4	+6.2
Majority		288	28.0	+16.2
Turnout		1,027	49	+3
Conservative hold		Swing		

Tadley South
Party	Candidate	Votes	%	±%
Conservative	Rob Musson	1,084	59.2	
Labour	Simon Cooper	306	16.7	
Liberal Democrats	Ian Hankinson	300	16.4	
UKIP	John Bentham	141	7.7	
Majority		778	42.5	
Turnout		1,831	42	+10
Conservative hold		Swing		

Upton Grey and The Candovers
Party	Candidate	Votes	%	±%
Conservative	Mark Ruffell	1,077	85.1	−6.4
Labour	Nigel Pierce	189	14.9	+6.4
Majority		888	70.1	−13.0
Turnout		1,266	57	+10
Conservative hold		Swing		

Winklebury
Party	Candidate	Votes	%	±%
Conservative	Steven Peach	1,002	49.9	−0.7
Labour	Lea Jeff	901	44.8	+14.0
Liberal Democrats	Michael Berwick-Gooding	107	5.3	−10.2
Majority		101	5.0	−14.8
Turnout		2,010	44	−21
Conservative hold		Swing		

Preceded by 2010 Basingstoke and Deane Council election	Basingstoke and Deane local elections	Succeeded by 2012 Basingstoke and Deane Council election
