= Basingstoke and Deane Borough Council elections =

Local government elections in Hampshire, England

One third of Basingstoke and Deane Borough Council in Hampshire, England is elected each year, followed by one year without election. Since the last boundary changes in 2021, 54 councillors have been elected from 18 wards.

== Election results ==
Composition of the council
Year	Conservative	Labour	Liberal Democrats (Note: Includes totals for the predecessors of the Liberal Democrats, the Liberal Party and SDP (both of which participated in the Alliance).)	BDI	Green (Note: Includes totals for the predecessors of the Green Party of England and Wales, the Ecology Party and Green Party UK.)	Independents & Others	Council control after election
Local government reorganisation; council established (54 seats)
1973	21	14	3	–	–	16	No overall control
New ward boundaries (59 seats)
1976	35	14	1	–	0	9	Conservative
1978	36	14	2	–	0	7	Conservative
1979	37	14	3	–	0	5	Conservative
1980	34	17	3	–	0	5	Conservative
1982	26	22	4	–	0	7	No overall control
1983	28	22	3	–	0	6	No overall control
1984	29	19	4	–	0	7	No overall control
1986	32	17	5	–	0	5	Conservative
1987	32	14	9	–	0	4	Conservative
1988	33	13	9	–	0	4	Conservative
1990	31	15	10	–	0	3	Conservative
1991	30	14	12	–	0	3	Conservative
New ward boundaries (59 seats)
1992	35	11	9	–	0	2	Conservative
1994	28	11	13	–	0	5	No overall control
1995	25	13	15	–	0	4	No overall control
1996	23	14	17	–	0	3	No overall control
1998	25	15	13	–	0	4	No overall control
1999	24	15	14	–	0	4	No overall control
2000	24	15	15	–	0	3	No overall control
New ward boundaries (62 seats)
2002	25	15	17	–	0	3	No overall control
2003	26	15	15	–	0	4	No overall control
2004	28	12	16	–	0	4	No overall control
2006	31	11	15	–	0	3	Conservative
2007	31	11	15	–	0	3	Conservative
New ward boundaries (60 seats)
2008	35	9	14	–	0	2	Conservative
2010	34	11	13	–	0	3	Conservative
2011	34	11	13	–	0	2	Conservative
2012	32	14	11	–	0	3	Conservative
2014	28	17	9	–	0	6 (Note: 5 Independent, 1 UKIP)	No overall control
2015	32	17	7	–	0	4 (Note: 3 Independents, 1 UKIP)	Conservative
2016	33	19	6	–	0	2 (Note: 1 Independent, 1 UKIP)	Conservative
2018	33	21	5	–	0	1	Conservative
2019	33	21	7	–	0	1	Conservative
New ward boundaries (54 seats)
2021	33	10	5	5	0	1	Conservative
2022	29	10	7	8	0	0	Conservative
2023	23	10	9	8	1	3	No overall control
2024	16	11	11	10	2	4 (Note: 3 Independents, 1 Women's Equality)	No overall control
2026	11	10	11	12	2	7 (Note: 3 Independents, 2 All In Party, 2 Reform)	No overall control

== Borough result maps ==
2002 results map

2003 results map

2004 results map

2006 results map

2007 results map

2008 results map

2010 results map

2011 results map

2012 results map

2014 results map

2015 results map

2016 results map

2018 results map

2019 results map

2021 results map

2022 results map

2023 results map

2024 results map

2026 results map

== By-election results ==
=== 1994-1998 ===
Grove By-Election 1 August 1996
Party	Candidate	Votes	%	±%
Conservative		683	36.0	
Liberal Democrats		646	34.0	
Labour		409	21.9	
Independent		152	8.0	
Independent		7	0.4	
Majority		37	2.0	
Turnout		1,897	43.4	
Conservative hold		Swing		

South Hams By-Election 12 September 1996
Party	Candidate	Votes	%	±%
Labour		892	77.4	
Conservative		195	16.9	
Liberal Democrats		65	5.6	
Majority		697	60.5	
Turnout		1,152	21.0	
Labour hold		Swing		

Norden By-Election 12 September 1996
Party	Candidate	Votes	%	±%
Labour		706	65.9	
Liberal Democrats		172	16.1	
Conservative		168	15.7	
Independent		25	2.3	
Majority		534	49.8	
Turnout		1,071	19.6	
Labour hold		Swing		

Norden By-Election 3 July 1997
Party	Candidate	Votes	%	±%
Labour		653	66.6	+0.7
Conservative		253	25.8	+10.1
Liberal Democrats		75	7.6	−8.5
Majority		400	40.8	
Turnout		981	17.9	−1.7
Labour hold		Swing		

=== 1998-2002 ===
Winklebury By-Election 7 June 2001
Party	Candidate	Votes	%	±%
Labour		1,503	45.8	+5.0
Conservative		1,243	37.9	+8.4
Liberal Democrats		532	16.0	+2.0
Majority		260	7.9	
Turnout		3,278		
Labour hold		Swing		

=== 2006-2010 ===
Buckskin By-Election 21 December 2006
Party	Candidate	Votes	%	±%
Conservative	Robert Taylor	332	47.1	+15.2
Labour	Gill Gleeson	210	29.8	−19.0
Liberal Democrats	Stephen Day	123	17.4	+17.4
Green	Matthew Pinto	40	5.7	+5.7
Majority		122	17.3	
Turnout		705	22.1	
Conservative gain from Labour		Swing		

Rooksdown By-Election 29 March 2007
Party	Candidate	Votes	%	±%
Conservative	Karen Cherrett	156	52.7	−10.9
Liberal Democrats	Andrew Hood	122	41.2	+4.8
Labour	Warwick Dady	18	6.1	+6.1
Majority		34	11.5	
Turnout		296	33.7	
Conservative hold		Swing		

Whitchurch By-Election 18 October 2007
Party	Candidate	Votes	%	±%
Liberal Democrats	Eric Dunlop	858	52.8	−5.6
Conservative	Bill Judge	709	43.6	+2.0
Labour	James Gibb	58	3.6	+3.6
Majority		149	9.2	
Turnout		1,125	42.5	
Liberal Democrats hold		Swing		

Baughurst By-Election 24 January 2008
Party	Candidate	Votes	%	±%
Liberal Democrats	Michael Bound	428	53.8	+20.3
Conservative	Zoe Wheddon	368	46.2	−20.3
Majority		60	7.6	
Turnout		796	40.6	
Liberal Democrats gain from Conservative		Swing		

Chineham By-Election 15 October 2009
Party	Candidate	Votes	%	±%
Conservative	Paul Miller	898	63.0	+19.1
Liberal Democrats	Liam Elvish	249	17.5	+7.7
Independent	Josephine Walke	163	11.4	−29.5
Labour	Simon Broad	98	6.9	+1.4
Independent	Tracy Cross	18	1.3	+1.3
Majority		649	45.5	
Turnout		1,426	21.1	
Conservative hold		Swing		

=== 2014-2018 ===
Basing by-election 6 October 2016
Party	Candidate	Votes	%	±%
Conservative	Paul Gaskell	1,051	67.5	+3.7
Liberal Democrats	Richard Lilleker	323	20.7	+8.3
Labour	Andrew Toal	184	11.8	−0.1
Majority		728	46.7	
Turnout		1,558		
Conservative hold		Swing	-2.3	

Tadley South by-election 24 November 2016
Party	Candidate	Votes	%	±%
Conservative	Kerri Carruthers	456	49.2	−12.1
Liberal Democrats	Josephine Slimin	342	36.9	+13.8
Labour	Claire Ballard	88	9.5	−6.1
UKIP	Philip Heath	41	4.4	+4.4
Majority		114	12.3	
Turnout		927		
Conservative hold		Swing	-13.0	

Winklebury by-election 21 February 2017
Party	Candidate	Votes	%	±%
Labour	Angie Freeman	824	61.6	+31.2
Conservative	Chris Hendon	472	35.3	−10.5
Liberal Democrats	Zoe-Marie Rogers	42	3.1	−2.7
Majority		352	26.3	
Turnout		1338		
Labour gain from Conservative		Swing		

Kempshott by-election 1 March 2018
Party	Candidate	Votes	%	±%
Conservative	Tomy Capon	686	58.9	−5.6
Labour	Grant Donohoe	366	31.4	+12.3
Liberal Democrats	Stavroulla O'Doherty	113	9.7	+9.7
Majority		320	27.5	
Turnout		1,165		
Conservative hold		Swing		

=== 2018-2022 ===
Kempshott by-election 18 June 2018
Party	Candidate	Votes	%	±%
Conservative	Anne Court	884	60.4	−6.4
Labour	Alex Lee	475	32.4	+11.2
Liberal Democrats	Stavroulla O'Doherty	105	7.2	−4.8
Majority		409	27.9	
Turnout		1,464		
Conservative hold		Swing		

Norden by-election 25 October 2018
Party	Candidate	Votes	%	±%
Labour	Carolyn Wooldridge	925	68.2	+2.6
Conservative	Michael Archer	288	21.2	−2.5
Independent	Phil Heath	80	5.9	+5.9
Liberal Democrats	Zoe Rogers	64	4.7	−0.2
Majority		637	46.9	
Turnout		1,357		
Labour hold		Swing		

Bramley and Sherfield by-election 10 October 2019
Party	Candidate	Votes	%	±%
Independent	Chris Tomblin	800	57.2	+57.2
Conservative	Angus Groom	449	32.1	−24.1
Independent	Joyce Bowyer	150	10.7	+10.7
Majority		351	25.1	
Turnout		1,399		
Independent gain from Conservative		Swing		
