= 2010 Basingstoke and Deane Borough Council election =

2010 UK local government election

← 2008	6 May 2010	2011 →

20 seats of 60 to Basingstoke and Deane Borough Council 31 seats needed for a majority
- Turnout: 67.5%
	First party	Second party
Party	Conservative	Liberal Democrats
Seats won	34	14
Seat change	+1	0
Popular vote	30,179	19,664
Percentage	46.8%	30.5%
	Third party	Fourth party
Party	Labour	Independent
Seats won	9	2
Popular vote	11,169	1,706
Percentage	17.3%	2.6%
Council control before election
Conservative Party (UK)
Council control after election
Conservative Party (UK)

The 2010 Basingstoke and Deane Council election took place on 6 May 2010 to elect members of Basingstoke and Deane Borough Council in Hampshire, England. It was part of the wider English Local Elections, which were postponed from their usual date of the first Thursday of May so that they could coincide with the General Election of that year. One third of the council was up for election and the Conservative Party stayed in overall control of the council.

== Background ==
Between the 2008 election and 2010, 2 Conservatives councillors left the party. Husband and wife Phil and Christine Heath split from the Conservatives in 2008 and formed the Basingstoke First Community Party, which would contest the 2010 election.

== Election result ==
The results saw the Conservatives increase their majority on the council from 5 to 7 seats, after making 1 gain to have 34 councillors. They retook Kempshott, which had formerly been held by the leader of the Basingstoke First Community Party, Christine Heath. Heath did not defend the seat which she had held for the previous 7 years, instead she stood in Hatch Warren and Beggarwood ward, which was held by the Conservatives. The other parties retained all the seats they had been defending, meaning the Liberal Democrats remained on 14 seats, Labour 9 and independents 2, while the Basingstoke First Community Party was left with 1 seat which was not contested at the election. Overall turnout in the election was 67.5%.

Basingstoke and Deane local election result 2010
Party	Seats	Gains	Losses	Net gain/loss	Seats %	Votes %	Votes	+/−
Conservative	9	1	0	+1	45.0	46.8	30,179	-10.0
Liberal Democrats	6	0	0	0	30.0	30.5	19,664	+4.8
Labour	4	0	0	0	20.0	17.3	11,169	+2.2
Independent	1	0	0	0	5.0	2.6	1,706	+0.4
Basingstoke First Community Party	0	0	1	-1	0.0	1.9	1,200	+1.9
UKIP	0	0	0	0	0.0	0.6	360	+0.6
BNP	0	0	0	0	0.0	0.3	202	+0.3

== Ward results ==
Basing
Party	Candidate	Votes	%	±%
Conservative	Onnalee Cubitt	3,288	65.7	
Liberal Democrats	Stav O'Doherty	1,187	23.7	
Labour	Leslie Clarke	530	10.6	
Majority		2,101	42.0	
Turnout		5,005	75	+26
Conservative hold		Swing		

Brighton Hill North
Party	Candidate	Votes	%	±%
Liberal Democrats	Brian Gurden	1,393	55.1	
Conservative	Laura Edwards	728	28.8	
Labour	Carolyn Wooldridge	406	16.1	
Majority		665	26.3	
Turnout		2,527	63	+34
Liberal Democrats hold		Swing		

Brighton Hill South
Party	Candidate	Votes	%	±%
Liberal Democrats	John Barnes	1,064	44.4	
Conservative	Marc Wheelhouse	900	37.6	
Labour	Shelley Phelps	431	18.0	
Majority		164	6.8	
Turnout		2,395	61	+32
Liberal Democrats hold		Swing		

Brookvale and Kings Furlong
Party	Candidate	Votes	%	±%
Liberal Democrats	John Shaw	1,353	50.1	
Conservative	John Downes	840	31.1	
Labour	Philip Courtenay	510	18.9	
Majority		513	19.0	
Turnout		2,703	63	+32
Liberal Democrats hold		Swing		

Buckskin
Party	Candidate	Votes	%	±%
Conservative	Robert Taylor	1,153	45.0	
Labour	Tony Jones	676	26.4	
Liberal Democrats	Tom Mitchell	529	20.7	
BNP	Ray Dobing	202	7.9	
Majority		477	18.6	
Turnout		2,560	55	+22
Conservative hold		Swing		

Burghclere, Highclere and St Mary Bourne
Party	Candidate	Votes	%	±%
Conservative	Horace Mitchell	2,130	65.6	
Liberal Democrats	Anthony Davies	925	28.5	
UKIP	Emily Blatchford	193	5.9	
Majority		1,205	37.1	
Turnout		3,248	74	+30
Conservative hold		Swing		

Chineham
Party	Candidate	Votes	%	±%
Conservative	Paul Miller	2,805	59.3	
Liberal Democrats	Liam Elvish	839	17.7	
Labour	Simon Broad	684	14.4	
Independent	Jo Walke	406	8.6	
Majority		1,966	41.6	
Turnout		4,734	71	+38
Conservative hold		Swing		

East Woodhay
Party	Candidate	Votes	%	±%
Conservative	Clive Sanders	1,211	71.2	−14.5
Liberal Democrats	Pauleen Malone	491	28.8	+14.5
Majority		720	42.3	−29.2
Turnout		1,702	75	+34
Conservative hold		Swing		

Eastrop
Party	Candidate	Votes	%	±%
Liberal Democrats	Gavin James	1,172	50.8	
Conservative	Fiona Taylor	744	32.2	
Labour	Pauline Courtenay	391	16.9	
Majority		428	18.6	
Turnout		2,307	60	+28
Liberal Democrats hold		Swing		

Grove
Party	Candidate	Votes	%	±%
Liberal Democrats	Stephen Day	1,763	55.5	
Conservative	Penny Bates	1,081	34.0	
Labour	Nigel Wooldridge	333	10.5	
Majority		682	21.5	
Turnout		3,177	69	+27
Liberal Democrats hold		Swing		

Hatch Warren and Beggarwood
Party	Candidate	Votes	%	±%
Conservative	Terri Reid	2,686	58.1	
Liberal Democrats	Ruth Day	1,379	29.8	
Basingstoke First Community Party	Chris Heath	556	12.0	
Majority		1,307	28.3	
Turnout		4,621	70	+42
Conservative hold		Swing		

Kempshott
Party	Candidate	Votes	%	±%
Conservative	Hayley Eachus	2,586	55.4	
Liberal Democrats	Madeline Hussey	887	19.0	
Labour	Walter McCormick	647	13.9	
Basingstoke First Community Party	Tracy Cross	549	11.8	
Majority		1,699	36.4	
Turnout		4,669	81	+42
Conservative gain from Basingstoke First Community Party				

Norden
Party	Candidate	Votes	%	±%
Labour	Laura James	1,695	46.1	
Conservative	Rebecca Bean	1,206	32.8	
Liberal Democrats	Richard Whitechurch	773	21.0	
Majority		489	13.3	
Turnout		3,674	60	+30
Labour hold		Swing		

Oakley and North Waltham
Party	Candidate	Votes	%	±%
Conservative	Andrew Finney	2,550	61.4	
Liberal Democrats	Robert Cooper	1,099	26.4	
Labour	Rick Dady	507	12.2	
Majority		1,451	35.0	
Turnout		4,156	75	+30
Conservative hold		Swing		

Overton, Laverstoke and Steventon
Party	Candidate	Votes	%	±%
Independent	Ian Tilbury	1,300	47.1	
Conservative	Lyn Hardy	797	28.8	
Liberal Democrats	Jeff Teagle	666	24.1	
Majority		503	18.3	
Turnout		2,763	73	+27
Independent hold		Swing		

Popley East
Party	Candidate	Votes	%	±%
Labour	Andrew McCormick	988	47.9	
Conservative	Steve Oakley	638	31.0	
Liberal Democrats	Stephen Whitechurch	435	21.1	
Majority		350	16.9	
Turnout		2,061	56	+30
Labour hold		Swing		

Popley West
Party	Candidate	Votes	%	±%
Labour	Paul Frankum	815	41.5	
Conservative	Sandra Miller	708	36.0	
Liberal Democrats	Michael Berwick-Gooding	443	22.5	
Majority		107	5.5	
Turnout		1,966	60	+32
Labour hold		Swing		

South Ham
Party	Candidate	Votes	%	±%
Labour	Sean Keating	1,606	39.2	
Conservative	John Holley	1,495	36.5	
Liberal Democrats	Janice Spalding	995	24.3	
Majority		111	2.7	
Turnout		4,096	62	+27
Labour hold		Swing		

Whitchurch
Party	Candidate	Votes	%	±%
Liberal Democrats	Keith Watts	1,792	59.1	
Conservative	Bill Judge	1,073	35.4	
UKIP	George Garton	167	5.5	
Majority		719	23.7	
Turnout		3,032	74	+28
Liberal Democrats hold		Swing		

Winklebury
Party	Candidate	Votes	%	±%
Conservative	Robert Donnell	1,560	50.6	
Labour	Lea Jeff	950	30.8	
Liberal Democrats	Jade Doswell	479	15.5	
Basingstoke First Community Party	Karen Campbell	95	3.1	
Majority		610	19.8	
Turnout		3,084	65	+26
Conservative hold		Swing		

Preceded by 2008 Basingstoke and Deane Council election	Basingstoke and Deane local elections	Succeeded by 2011 Basingstoke and Deane Council election
