= RG postcode area =

Postcode area within the United Kingdom

Reading
- Postcode area
- Coordinates: 51.403°N 1.035°W
- Sovereign state: United Kingdom
- Postcode area: RG
- Postcode area name: Reading
- Post towns: 12
- Postcode districts: 35
- Postcode sectors: 184
- Postcodes (live): 23,146
- Postcodes (total): 45,599
- Statistics as at May 2020

The RG postcode area, also known as the Reading postcode area, is a group of thirty postcode districts in England, within twelve post towns. These cover west and central Berkshire (including Reading, Bracknell, Crowthorne, Hungerford, Newbury, Thatcham and Wokingham) and north Hampshire (including Basingstoke, Hook, Tadley and Whitchurch), plus a small part of south-east Oxfordshire (including Henley-on-Thames) and very small parts of Buckinghamshire and Wiltshire.

Following the closure of Reading Mail Centre in 2010, mail for the RG postcode area is processed at Thames Valley Mail Centre in Swindon, along with mail for the OX and SN postcode areas.

The original RG3 district for west Reading was recoded to RG30 and RG31 in January 1995, due to the rise in population in that area. In the same year, the original RG11 district for Wokingham and Crowthorne was recoded to RG40, RG41 and RG45, while the northern part of the RG12 district for Bracknell was recoded to RG42. Hungerford and Thatcham was also separated from the Newbury-dependent RG15 and RG16 postcodes, subsequently being recoded into RG17 and RG18-19, respectively, thus reducing the extent of the Newbury postal town to RG14 and RG20. RG26-29 ceased to be dependent on the Basingstoke postal town as the areas the postcodes represent were assigned new postal towns.

== Coverage ==
The approximate coverage of the postcode districts:

| Postcode district | Post town | Coverage | Local authority area(s) |
|---|---|---|---|
| RG1 | READING | Katesgrove, Newtown, Reading (central) | Reading |
| RG2 | READING | Madejski Stadium, Whitley, Shinfield, Arborfield Garrison, Arborfield, Green Park Village | Reading, Wokingham |
| RG4 | READING | Caversham, Sonning, Sonning Common, Kidmore End, Sonning Eye, Dunsden Green, Mapledurham, Chazey Heath, Tokers Green, Chalkhouse Green, Cane End | Reading, South Oxfordshire, Wokingham |
| RG5 | READING | Woodley | Wokingham |
| RG6 | READING | Earley | Wokingham, Reading |
| RG7 | READING | Aldermaston, Beenham, Bradfield, Burghfield Common, Riseley, Silchester, Mortimer, Swallowfield, Theale, Woolhampton | West Berkshire, Basingstoke and Deane, Wokingham |
| RG8 | READING | Goring, Streatley, Pangbourne, Whitchurch-on-Thames | South Oxfordshire, West Berkshire |
| RG9 | HENLEY-ON-THAMES | Henley-on-Thames, Hambleden, Rotherfield Peppard, Turville, Turville Heath, Skirmett, Rockwell End, Mill End, Fawley, Fingest, Frieth, Greenlands, Nettlebed, Shiplake | South Oxfordshire, Buckinghamshire |
| RG10 | READING | Charvil, Hurst, Ruscombe, Twyford, Wargrave, Waltham St Lawrence | Wokingham, Windsor and Maidenhead |
| RG12 | BRACKNELL | Bracknell (south and town centre), Easthampstead, Bullbrook | Bracknell Forest |
| RG14 | NEWBURY | Newbury (whole town area) | West Berkshire |
| RG17 | HUNGERFORD | Chilton Foliat, Eastbury, Eddington, Kintbury, Hungerford, Inkpen, Lambourn, North Wessex Downs AONB area | West Berkshire, Wiltshire, Vale of White Horse |
| RG18 | THATCHAM | Hampstead Norreys, Hermitage, Thatcham (north), Yattendon | West Berkshire |
| RG19 | THATCHAM | Ashford Hill with Headley, Bishop's Green, Greenham, Thatcham (south) | West Berkshire, Basingstoke and Deane |
| RG20 | NEWBURY | Ashmansworth, Chieveley, Compton, Ecchinswell, Leckhampstead, Highclere, Kingsclere, Sydmonton | West Berkshire, Basingstoke and Deane |
| RG21 | BASINGSTOKE | Town Centre, Eastrop, Black Dam, Oakridge, South View | Basingstoke and Deane |
| RG22 | BASINGSTOKE | South Ham, Brighton Hill, Kempshott, Buckskin, Beggarwood | Basingstoke and Deane |
| RG23 | BASINGSTOKE | Winklebury, Rooksdown, Oakley | Basingstoke and Deane |
| RG24 | BASINGSTOKE | Popley, Chineham, Sherborne St John | Basingstoke and Deane |
| RG25 | BASINGSTOKE | Cliddesden, Dummer, Overton, North Waltham | Basingstoke and Deane |
| RG26 | TADLEY | Baughurst, Bramley, Brimpton Common, Hannington, Pamber End, Pamber Heath, Tadley | Basingstoke and Deane, West Berkshire |
| RG27 | HOOK | Hook, Sherfield-on-Loddon, Stratfield Turgis, Turgis Green | Basingstoke and Deane, Hart |
| RG28 | WHITCHURCH | Laverstoke, Litchfield, Hurstbourne Priors, Whitchurch (Hants) | Basingstoke and Deane, Test Valley |
| RG29 | HOOK | Long Sutton, Odiham, North Warnborough, South Warnborough | Hart |
| RG30 | READING | Tilehurst (east), Prospect Park, Burghfield village, West Reading, Southcote | Reading, West Berkshire |
| RG31 | READING | Calcot, Tilehurst (west) | Reading, West Berkshire |
| RG40 | WOKINGHAM | Wokingham (east and town centre), Finchampstead, Barkham (south), Wick Hill | Wokingham, Bracknell Forest |
| RG41 | WOKINGHAM | Wokingham (west), Winnersh, Woosehill, Barkham (north), Sindlesham, Emmbrook, Eastheath | Wokingham |
| RG42 | BRACKNELL | Bracknell (north), Binfield, Warfield, Newell Green, Popeswood, Priestwood, Winkfield Row, Jealott's Hill | Bracknell Forest |
| RG45 | CROWTHORNE | Crowthorne, Ravenswood | Bracknell Forest, Wokingham |

== Map ==
RG postcode area map, showing postcode districts in red and post towns in grey text, with links to nearby GU, HP, OX, SL, SN, SO and SP postcode areas.

== See also ==
- Postcode Address File
- List of postcode areas in the United Kingdom
