= 2008 Basingstoke and Deane Borough Council election =

2008 UK local government election

← 2007	1 May 2008	2010 →

All 60 seats to Basingstoke and Deane Borough Council 31 seats needed for a majority
- Turnout: 37%
	First party	Second party
Party	Conservative	Liberal Democrats
Seats won	35	14
Seat change	+5	-2
Popular vote	51,638	23,403
Percentage	56.8%	25.7%
	Third party	Fourth party
Party	Labour	Independent
Seats won	9	2
Seat change	-2	-1
Popular vote	13,770	2,037
Percentage	15.1%	2.2%
Council control before election
Conservative Party (UK)
Council control after election
Conservative Party (UK)

The 2008 Basingstoke and Deane Council election took place on 1 May 2008 to elect members of Basingstoke and Deane Borough Council in Hampshire, England. The whole council was up for election with boundary changes since the 2007 election. The Conservative Party gained overall control of the council from no overall control.

== Background ==
After the last election in 2007 the Conservatives had a majority on the council with 31 of the 60 seats. However the Conservatives would lose their majority after defeat by the Liberal Democrats in a by-election in Baughurst in January 2008 left the Conservatives with exactly half of the seats.

The whole council was contested in 2008 instead of the usual third, after changes were made to the boundaries. The changes included abolishing Calleva ward and creating a Bramley and Sherfield ward. Tadley North was split in two, Burghclere was merged with Highclere and St Mary Bourne and the number of seats in Winklebury ward was reduced by one.

Councillors standing down at the election included Gwen Richardson and Erica Shaw, while former Labour group leader David Potter and the former Conservative council leader from the 1980s and 1990s, Stephen Reid, attempted to return to the council. Meanwhile, Independent councillor David Leeks, stood for the Conservatives after joining the party.

== Election results ==
The results saw the Conservatives gain a 10-seat majority on the council after winning 35 of the 60 seats. This was compared to 14 Liberal Democrat, 9 Labour and 2 independent councillors. Among those defeated in the election was the leader of the Labour group on the council, Gary Watts, who lost in South Ham and the mayor Warwick Lovegrove. The former leader of the council Stephen Reid returned to the council in Buckskin, defeating a former mayor Tony Jones. Overall turnout in the election was 37%.

Following the election Conservative Andrew Finney became the new leader of the council succeeding John Leek.

Basingstoke and Deane local election result 2008
Party	Seats	Gains	Losses	Net gain/loss	Seats %	Votes %	Votes	+/−
Conservative	35			+5	58.3	56.8	51,638	+2.4
Liberal Democrats	14			-2	23.3	25.7	23,403	+2.1
Labour	9			-2	15.0	15.1	13,770	-3.3
Independent	2			-1	3.3	2.2	2,037	-1.5
Green	0			0	0.0	0.1	86	+0.1

== Ward results ==
Basing (3)
Party	Candidate	Votes	%	±%
Conservative	Sven Godesen	1,962		
Conservative	Stephen Marks	1,821		
Conservative	Onnalee Cubitt	1,725		
Liberal Democrats	Alan Read	1,161		
Liberal Democrats	Patricia Read	1,042		
Liberal Democrats	Anna Archibald	928		
Labour	Julie Johnson	149		
Turnout		8,788	49	

Baughurst and Tadley North (2)
Party	Candidate	Votes	%	±%
Liberal Democrats	Michael Bound	953		
Conservative	Graham Round	887		
Liberal Democrats	Warwick Lovegrove	864		
Labour	David Carr	126		
Turnout		2,830	41	

Bramley and Sherfield (2)
Party	Candidate	Votes	%	±%
Conservative	Rhydian Vaughan	1,091		
Conservative	Ranil Jayawardena	1,063		
Liberal Democrats	Elaine Cameron	230		
Liberal Democrats	Janice Spalding	189		
Labour	Faye Jones	113		
Turnout		2,686	39	

Brighton Hill North (2)
Party	Candidate	Votes	%	±%
Liberal Democrats	Sheila Rowland	689		
Liberal Democrats	Brian Gurden	675		
Conservative	Roy Hall-Lacy	285		
Conservative	Zoe Wheddon	259		
Labour	Criss Connor	117		
Labour	Colin Regan	116		
Turnout		2,141	29	

Brighton Hill South (2)
Party	Candidate	Votes	%	±%
Liberal Democrats	Kevin Harkess	578		
Liberal Democrats	John Barnes	524		
Conservative	John Holley	390		
Conservative	Matt Wheddon	362		
Labour	Elizabeth Regan	187		
Labour	Steve Rothman	143		
Turnout		2,184	29	

Brookvale and Kings Furlong (2)
Party	Candidate	Votes	%	±%
Liberal Democrats	Doris Jones	834		
Liberal Democrats	John Shaw	818		
Conservative	Darcy Jones	306		
Conservative	John Loveys Jervoise	267		
Labour	Pauline Courtenay	142		
Labour	Philip Courtenay	130		
Turnout		2,497	31	

Buckskin (2)
Party	Candidate	Votes	%	±%
Conservative	Stephen Reid	680		
Conservative	Robert Taylor	678		
Labour	Tony Jones	437		
Labour	Gill Gleeson	429		
Liberal Democrats	Eric Jones	152		
Turnout		2,376	33	

Burghclere, Highclere and St Mary Bourne (2)
Party	Candidate	Votes	%	±%
Conservative	James Lewin	1,452		
Conservative	Horace Mitchell	1,370		
Liberal Democrats	Pauleen Malone	295		
Liberal Democrats	Anthony Davies	285		
Labour	Romilla Arber	115		
Turnout		3,517	44	

Chineham (3)
Party	Candidate	Votes	%	±%
Conservative	Elaine Still	1,212		
Independent	Martin Biermann	1,129		
Conservative	John Downes	1,013		
Conservative	Hayley Eachus	878		
Liberal Democrats	Liam Elvish	271		
Liberal Democrats	Sheena Grassi	170		
Labour	Eddie Davey	151		
Turnout		4,824	33	

East Woodhay
Party	Candidate	Votes	%	±%
Conservative	Clive Sanders	770	85.7	
Liberal Democrats	Lucy Sloane Williams	128	14.3	
Majority		642	71.4	
Turnout		898	41	

Eastrop (2)
Party	Candidate	Votes	%	±%
Liberal Democrats	Stuart Parker	660		
Liberal Democrats	Gavin James	542		
Conservative	Ronald Collins	280		
Conservative	Rebecca Downes	271		
Labour	Phil Howe	128		
Labour	Eileen Cavanagh	122		
Green	Matthew Pinto	86		
Turnout		2,089	32	

Grove (2)
Party	Candidate	Votes	%	±%
Liberal Democrats	Ronald Hussey	1,187		
Liberal Democrats	Stephen Day	1,045		
Conservative	Stephen McConnell	602		
Conservative	Nalin Jayawardena	546		
Labour	Hema Krishan	90		
Labour	David Potter	80		
Turnout		3,550	42	

Hatch Warren and Beggarwood (3)
Party	Candidate	Votes	%	±%
Conservative	Dan Putty	1,291		
Conservative	Philip Heath	1,254		
Conservative	Harold Robinson	1,245		
Liberal Democrats	Ruth Day	354		
Liberal Democrats	Josephine Amesbury	237		
Liberal Democrats	Thomas Mitchell	235		
Labour	Dawn Watts	189		
Labour	Mike Stockwell	123		
Labour	Upali Wickremeratne	113		
Turnout		5,041	28	

Kempshott (3)
Party	Candidate	Votes	%	±%
Conservative	Anne Court	1,683		
Conservative	Rita Burgess	1,586		
Conservative	Christine Heath	1,560		
Labour	Richard Davey	278		
Liberal Democrats	Eleanor Gurden	273		
Liberal Democrats	Sheila Lock	257		
Liberal Democrats	Alan Simpson	253		
Labour	Walter McCormick	251		
Labour	Nigel Wooldridge	197		
Turnout		6,338	39	

Kingsclere (2)
Party	Candidate	Votes	%	±%
Conservative	Cathy Osselton	1,288		
Conservative	Ken Rhatigan	1,134		
Liberal Democrats	Roger Ward	206		
Labour	Jim Gibb	186		
Liberal Democrats	Jean Watts	153		
Turnout		2,967	41	

Norden (3)
Party	Candidate	Votes	%	±%
Labour	Paul Harvey	1,005		
Labour	George Hood	997		
Labour	Laura James	990		
Conservative	Keith Brant	548		
Conservative	Jim Holder	522		
Conservative	Nigel McNair Scott	510		
Liberal Democrats	Janet Renwick	244		
Liberal Democrats	Jade Doswell	225		
Liberal Democrats	Alistair Archibald	213		
Turnout		5,254	30	

Oakley and North Waltham (3)
Party	Candidate	Votes	%	±%
Conservative	Diane Taylor	1,299		
Conservative	Cecilia Morrison	1,284		
Conservative	Andrew Finney	1,119		
Liberal Democrats	John Burbidge-King	366		
Liberal Democrats	Robert Cooper	241		
Liberal Democrats	Caroline Statham	203		
Labour	David Cavanagh	88		
Labour	Roger Bailey	80		
Turnout		4,680	45	

Overton, Laverstoke and Steventon (2)
Party	Candidate	Votes	%	±%
Liberal Democrats	Paula Baker	924		
Independent	Ian Tilbury	908		
Conservative	Marion Jones	442		
Conservative	Clare Coffey	398		
Liberal Democrats	Jacky Lessware	301		
Labour	Rick Dady	98		
Turnout		3,071	46	

Pamber and Silchester (2)
Party	Candidate	Votes	%	±%
Conservative	Keith Chapman	1,285		
Conservative	Marilyn Tucker	1,091		
Liberal Democrats	Marina Barnett	339		
Labour	Terry Price	206		
Turnout		2,921	44	

Popley East (2)
Party	Candidate	Votes	%	±%
Labour	Mary Brian	546		
Labour	Andy McCormick	535		
Conservative	Hugo Cubitt	254		
Conservative	Gordon Pirie	217		
Liberal Democrats	Cynthia Oliver	120		
Liberal Democrats	Stephen Whitechurch	110		
Turnout		1,782	26	

Popley West (2)
Party	Candidate	Votes	%	±%
Labour	Jane Frankum	386		
Labour	Paul Frankum	345		
Conservative	Paul Miller	250		
Conservative	Christopher Aldous	232		
Liberal Democrats	Peter Harris	81		
Liberal Democrats	Roger Barnard	75		
Turnout		1,369	28	

Rooksdown
Party	Candidate	Votes	%	±%
Conservative	Karen Cherrett	261	65.6	
Liberal Democrats	Michael Berwick-Gooding	114	28.6	
Labour	Stan Parry	23	5.8	
Majority		147	37.0	
Turnout		398	37	

Sherborne St John
Party	Candidate	Votes	%	±%
Conservative	John Leek	652	79.1	
Liberal Democrats	John Wall	114	13.8	
Labour	Tony Frankum	58	7.0	
Majority		538	65.3	
Turnout		824	47	

South Ham (3)
Party	Candidate	Votes	%	±%
Labour	Gerry Traynor	1,056		
Conservative	Richard Court	1,023		
Labour	Sean Keating	941		
Conservative	Lee Jones	913		
Conservative	Roger Gardiner	911		
Labour	Gary Watts	869		
Liberal Democrats	Kevin Oxlade	318		
Liberal Democrats	Madeline Hussey	249		
Liberal Democrats	Benjamin Heley	225		
Turnout		6,505	35	

Tadley Central
Party	Candidate	Votes	%	±%
Conservative	Stephen West	529	54.3	
Liberal Democrats	Jo Slimin	414	42.5	
Labour	Ray Curry	31	3.2	
Majority		115	11.8	
Turnout		974	46	

Tadley South (2)
Party	Candidate	Votes	%	±%
Conservative	David Leeks	1,048		
Conservative	Rob Musson	928		
Liberal Democrats	Ian Hankinson	371		
Labour	Susan Dady	167		
Turnout		2,514	32	

Upton Grey and The Candovers
Party	Candidate	Votes	%	±%
Conservative	Mark Ruffell	919	91.5	
Labour	Ronald Rowe	85	8.5	
Majority		834	83.0	
Turnout		1,004	47	

Whitchurch (2)
Party	Candidate	Votes	%	±%
Liberal Democrats	Eric Dunlop	922		
Liberal Democrats	Keith Watts	862		
Conservative	Bill Judge	846		
Conservative	Therese Coffey	779		
Turnout		3,409	46	

Winklebury (2)
Party	Candidate	Votes	%	±%
Conservative	Rob Golding	1,097		
Conservative	Robert Donnell	1,070		
Labour	Angie Freeman	580		
Labour	Lea Jeff	572		
Liberal Democrats	Richard Whitechurch	97		
Liberal Democrats	Obi Nwasike	87		
Turnout		3,503	39	

Preceded by 2007 Basingstoke and Deane Council election	Basingstoke and Deane local elections	Succeeded by 2010 Basingstoke and Deane Council election
