= 2004 Basingstoke and Deane Borough Council election =

2004 UK local government election

Results of the 2004 Basingstoke and Deane Borough Council election

The 2004 Basingstoke and Deane Council election took place on 10 June 2004 to elect members of Basingstoke and Deane Borough Council in Hampshire, England. One third of the council was up for election and the council stayed under no overall control.

After the election, the composition of the council was:

- Conservative 28
- Liberal Democrats 16
- Labour 12
- Independent 4

== Election results ==
The results saw the Conservatives gain 2 seats to hold 28 seats, level with the Labour and Liberal Democrat parties combined and leaving 4 Independents holding the balance on the council. The Conservatives increased their share of the vote and picked up Burghclere from a former Conservative turned independent, and Winklebury from Labour. Labour lost votes with the Labour leader of the council Rob Donnelly losing his seat in Popley East and the Liberal Democrats taking a seat from Labour in Brighton Hill South. Overall turnout in the election was 38.24%, an increase from the 31.33% in 2003, and put down to the European elections being held at the same time as the council election.

Following the election the Liberal Democrat and Labour alliance continued to run the council, after winning a 1-vote majority over the Conservatives at the annual council meeting. Independent Martin Biermann became chairman of the environment committee and a further 2 Independents became vice-chairmen of committees, leading to accusations by the Conservatives that a deal had been done with the Independents, but this was denied.

Basingstoke and Deane local election result 2004
| Party | Seats | Gains | Losses | Net gain/loss | Seats % | Votes % | Votes | +/− |
|---|---|---|---|---|---|---|---|---|
| Conservative | 11 | 2 | 0 | +2 | 50.0 | 50.5 | 16,570 | +4.3 |
| Liberal Democrats | 5 | 1 | 0 | +1 | 22.7 | 27.4 | 8,996 | +2.1 |
| Labour | 4 | 0 | 3 | -3 | 18.2 | 17.8 | 5,851 | -5.1 |
| Independent | 2 | 1 | 1 | 0 | 9.1 | 4.2 | 1,389 | -1.4 |

== Ward results ==
Basing
| Party | Candidate | Votes | % | ±% |
|---|---|---|---|---|
| Liberal Democrats | Patricia Read | 1,675 | 55.1 | +10.3 |
| Conservative | Sven Godesden | 1,363 | 44.9 | −2.2 |
| Majority | | 312 | 10.2 | |
| Turnout | | 3,038 | 48 | +8 |
| Liberal Democrats hold | | Swing | | |

Baughurst
| Party | Candidate | Votes | % | ±% |
|---|---|---|---|---|
| Conservative | Sheila Allen | 558 | 66.5 | +1.1 |
| Liberal Democrats | Christina Elkins | 281 | 33.5 | −1.1 |
| Majority | | 277 | 33.0 | +2.1 |
| Turnout | | 839 | 44 | +5 |
| Conservative hold | | Swing | | |

Brighton Hill North
| Party | Candidate | Votes | % | ±% |
|---|---|---|---|---|
| Liberal Democrats | Brian Gurden | 644 | 54.8 | |
| Conservative | Stephen McIntyre-Stewart | 378 | 32.1 | |
| Labour | Carl Reader | 154 | 13.1 | |
| Majority | | 266 | 22.7 | |
| Turnout | | 1,176 | 33 | +4 |
| Liberal Democrats hold | | Swing | | |

Brighton Hill South
| Party | Candidate | Votes | % | ±% |
|---|---|---|---|---|
| Liberal Democrats | Kevin Harkess | 548 | 43.3 | |
| Labour | Pamela Lonie | 408 | 32.2 | |
| Conservative | Richard Clewer | 311 | 24.5 | |
| Majority | | 140 | 11.1 | |
| Turnout | | 1,267 | 32 | +3 |
| Liberal Democrats gain from Labour | | Swing | | |

Buckskin
| Party | Candidate | Votes | % | ±% |
|---|---|---|---|---|
| Labour | Antony Jones | 384 | 48.8 | −5.3 |
| Conservative | Michael Cohen | 251 | 31.9 | −0.6 |
| Independent | Roger Blackmore-Squires | 152 | 19.3 | +19.3 |
| Majority | | 133 | 16.9 | −4.7 |
| Turnout | | 787 | 25 | +3 |
| Labour hold | | Swing | | |

Burghclere
| Party | Candidate | Votes | % | ±% |
|---|---|---|---|---|
| Conservative | Andrew Hewitt | 502 | 56.5 | −25.3 |
| Liberal Democrats | Anthony Davies | 386 | 43.5 | +25.3 |
| Majority | | 116 | 13.1 | −50.4 |
| Turnout | | 888 | 46 | +10 |
| Conservative gain from Independent | | Swing | | |

Calleva
| Party | Candidate | Votes | % | ±% |
|---|---|---|---|---|
| Conservative | Marilyn Tucker | 1,003 | 62.5 | −2.6 |
| Liberal Democrats | Roger Barnard | 342 | 21.3 | +4.3 |
| Labour | Terence Price | 260 | 16.2 | −1.7 |
| Majority | | 661 | 41.2 | −6.1 |
| Turnout | | 1,605 | 38 | +8 |
| Conservative hold | | Swing | | |

Chineham
| Party | Candidate | Votes | % | ±% |
|---|---|---|---|---|
| Conservative | Elaine Still | 1,277 | 67.1 | +15.6 |
| Liberal Democrats | Stephen Day | 471 | 24.8 | +24.8 |
| Labour | Jane Nicholas | 154 | 8.1 | −3.1 |
| Majority | | 806 | 42.4 | +28.3 |
| Turnout | | 1,902 | 37 | +7 |
| Conservative hold | | Swing | | |

Eastrop
| Party | Candidate | Votes | % | ±% |
|---|---|---|---|---|
| Liberal Democrats | Erica Shaw | 673 | 52.7 | |
| Conservative | Ronald Collins | 441 | 34.5 | |
| Labour | Pauline Courtenay | 164 | 12.8 | |
| Majority | | 232 | 18.2 | |
| Turnout | | 1,278 | 41 | +3 |
| Liberal Democrats hold | | Swing | | |

Hatch Warren and Beggarwood
| Party | Candidate | Votes | % | ±% |
|---|---|---|---|---|
| Conservative | Dan Putty | 1,321 | 65.0 | +8.0 |
| Liberal Democrats | Jennifer Crawford | 710 | 35.0 | +23.7 |
| Majority | | 611 | 30.1 | +4.9 |
| Turnout | | 2,031 | 33 | +7 |
| Conservative hold | | Swing | | |

Highclere and Bourne
| Party | Candidate | Votes | % | ±% |
|---|---|---|---|---|
| Conservative | John Mitchell | 736 | 67.2 | +1.2 |
| Liberal Democrats | Keith Watts | 360 | 32.8 | −1.2 |
| Majority | | 376 | 34.3 | +2.2 |
| Turnout | | 1,096 | 47 | −0 |
| Conservative hold | | Swing | | |

Kempshott
| Party | Candidate | Votes | % | ±% |
|---|---|---|---|---|
| Conservative | Rita Burgess | 1,750 | 71.9 | +14.0 |
| Labour | Richard Davey | 685 | 28.1 | +4.1 |
| Majority | | 1,065 | 43.7 | +9.7 |
| Turnout | | 2,435 | 41 | +8 |
| Conservative hold | | Swing | | |

Norden
| Party | Candidate | Votes | % | ±% |
|---|---|---|---|---|
| Labour | Laura James | 793 | 48.1 | −5.6 |
| Conservative | Nigel McNair Scott | 532 | 32.2 | +5.0 |
| Liberal Democrats | Richard Whitechurch | 325 | 19.7 | +0.6 |
| Majority | | 261 | 15.8 | −10.6 |
| Turnout | | 1,650 | 30 | +6 |
| Labour hold | | Swing | | |

Oakley and North Waltham
| Party | Candidate | Votes | % | ±% |
|---|---|---|---|---|
| Conservative | Gweneth Richardson | 1,625 | 68.7 | −10.4 |
| Liberal Democrats | John Burbidge-King | 539 | 22.8 | +22.8 |
| Labour | David Cavanagh | 200 | 8.5 | −12.4 |
| Majority | | 1,086 | 45.9 | −12.3 |
| Turnout | | 2,364 | 43 | +12 |
| Conservative hold | | Swing | | |

Popley East
| Party | Candidate | Votes | % | ±% |
|---|---|---|---|---|
| Independent | Ian Powney | 569 | 54.0 | +54.0 |
| Labour | Robert Donnelly | 294 | 27.9 | −34.2 |
| Conservative | Hayley Eachus | 131 | 12.4 | −9.1 |
| Liberal Democrats | Stephen Whitechurch | 60 | 5.7 | −10.7 |
| Majority | | 275 | 26.1 | |
| Turnout | | 1,054 | 33 | +14 |
| Independent gain from Labour | | Swing | | |

Popley West
| Party | Candidate | Votes | % | ±% |
|---|---|---|---|---|
| Labour | Jane Frankum | 369 | 49.6 | −8.3 |
| Conservative | Karen Dignan | 215 | 28.9 | +2.8 |
| Liberal Democrats | Michael Berwick-Gooding | 160 | 21.5 | +5.5 |
| Majority | | 154 | 20.7 | −11.1 |
| Turnout | | 744 | 30 | +6 |
| Labour hold | | Swing | | |

Rooksdown
| Party | Candidate | Votes | % | ±% |
|---|---|---|---|---|
| Conservative | Susan Peters | 231 | 63.6 | −6.1 |
| Liberal Democrats | Andrew Hood | 132 | 36.4 | +6.1 |
| Majority | | 99 | 27.3 | −12.2 |
| Turnout | | 363 | 41 | +10 |
| Conservative hold | | Swing | | |

Sherborne St John
| Party | Candidate | Votes | % | ±% |
|---|---|---|---|---|
| Conservative | John Leek | 695 | 70.6 | −10.3 |
| Liberal Democrats | Jacqueline Lessware | 177 | 18.0 | +18.0 |
| Labour | Eileen Cavanagh | 112 | 11.4 | −7.7 |
| Majority | | 518 | 52.6 | −9.3 |
| Turnout | | 984 | 42 | +6 |
| Conservative hold | | Swing | | |

South Ham
| Party | Candidate | Votes | % | ±% |
|---|---|---|---|---|
| Labour | Gary Watts | 863 | 46.3 | −15.6 |
| Conservative | Christopher Jones | 664 | 35.6 | +11.7 |
| Liberal Democrats | Leonard Clover | 337 | 18.1 | +3.9 |
| Majority | | 199 | 10.7 | −27.3 |
| Turnout | | 1,864 | 34 | +9 |
| Labour hold | | Swing | | |

Tadley North
| Party | Candidate | Votes | % | ±% |
|---|---|---|---|---|
| Liberal Democrats | Warwick Lovegrove | 1,176 | 61.3 | +22.7 |
| Conservative | William Hipgrave | 741 | 38.7 | −13.5 |
| Majority | | 435 | 22.6 | |
| Turnout | | 1,917 | 43 | +9 |
| Liberal Democrats hold | | Swing | | |

Tadley South
| Party | Candidate | Votes | % | ±% |
|---|---|---|---|---|
| Independent | David Leeks | 668 | 48.0 | +48.0 |
| Conservative | Andrew Giles | 556 | 40.0 | −16.0 |
| Labour | Robert Cross | 167 | 12.0 | −2.5 |
| Majority | | 112 | 8.0 | |
| Turnout | | 1,391 | 33 | +8 |
| Independent hold | | Swing | | |

Winklebury
| Party | Candidate | Votes | % | ±% |
|---|---|---|---|---|
| Conservative | Andrew Finney | 1,289 | 60.4 | +11.9 |
| Labour | Lea Jeff | 844 | 39.6 | +5.4 |
| Majority | | 445 | 20.9 | +6.6 |
| Turnout | | 2,133 | 43 | +7 |
| Conservative gain from Labour | | Swing | | |

| Preceded by 2003 Basingstoke and Deane Council election | Basingstoke and Deane local elections | Succeeded by 2006 Basingstoke and Deane Council election |
