= 2000 Basingstoke and Deane Borough Council election =

2000 UK local government election

The 2000 Basingstoke and Deane Council election took place on 4 May 2000 to elect members of Basingstoke and Deane Borough Council in Hampshire, England. One third of the council was up for election and the council stayed under no overall control.

After the election, the composition of the council was

- Conservative 24
- Liberal Democrats 15
- Labour 15
- Independent 3

== Election result ==
Overall turnout in the election was 29%.

Basingstoke and Deane local election result 2000
Party	Seats	Gains	Losses	Net gain/loss	Seats %	Votes %	Votes	+/−
Conservative	9			+1	47.4			
Liberal Democrats	6			+1	31.6			
Labour	3			-1	15.8			
Independent	1			-1	5.3			

Preceded by 1999 Basingstoke and Deane Council election	Basingstoke and Deane local elections	Succeeded by 2002 Basingstoke and Deane Council election
