= 2006 Basingstoke and Deane Borough Council election =

2006 UK local government election

Results of the 2006 Basingstoke and Deane Borough Council election

The 2006 Basingstoke and Deane Council election took place on 4 May 2006 to elect members of Basingstoke and Deane Borough Council in Hampshire, England. One third of the council was up for election and the council stayed under no overall control.

After the election, the composition of the council was:

- Conservative 30
- Liberal Democrats 15
- Labour 12
- Independent 3

== Background ==
At the previous election in 2004 the Conservatives were the largest party on the council with 28 seats, but the council was run by an alliance between the Liberal Democrat and Labour parties who had led the council for the previous 11 years. Between them the Liberal Democrat and Labour parties had 28 seats, while the balance was held by 4 Independents.

Between 2004 and 2006 one of the independent councillors, Ian Powney, joined the Liberal Democrats. However he resigned from the council before the election, along with his fellow Liberal Democrat Gill Nethercott. This meant 22 seats were contested in the 2006 election, with 2 by-elections in Popley East and Whitchurch.

== Campaign ==
As well as the 2 councillors who had resigned from the council before the election, a further 3 Conservatives councillors stood down at the election, Alan Denness, Andy Hewitt and Michael Ross. Candidates in the election included candidates from the Green Party for the first time in Basingstoke and Deane, as well as the Conservative, Labour and Liberal Democrat parties and 1 Independent.

In the run up to the election the national Conservative leader David Cameron visited Basingstoke to campaign for his party in the local election.

== Election result ==
The results saw the Conservatives gain 2 seats to hold half of the seats on the council. The Conservatives gained Basing from the Liberal Democrats and Winklebury from Labour. Meanwhile, Labour regained Popley East from the Liberal Democrats, after the former councillor Ian Powney stood down at the election. This meant the governing Liberal Democrat and Labour alliance was reduced to 27 seats, with the Liberal Democrats on 15 and Labour on 12, while independents remained on 3 seats.

Following the election the Conservatives took control of the council after winning the vote for council leader by 30 votes to 26. Conservative John Leek became the new leader of the council after 2 of the 3 independents abstained, along with 2 Labour councillors, the new mayor Tony Jones and Sean Keating. One of the independents who abstained, David Leeks, became a member of the new council cabinet, while the third independent had backed the continuation of the previous Liberal Democrat and Labour administration.

Basingstoke and Deane local election result 2006
Party	Seats	Gains	Losses	Net gain/loss	Seats %	Votes %	Votes	+/−
Conservative	10	2	0	+2	45.5	49.7	18,142	-0.8%
Liberal Democrats	8	0	2	-2	36.4	30.5	11,114	+3.1%
Labour	3	1	1	0	13.6	15.6	5,678	-2.2%
Independent	1	0	0	0	4.5	2.8	1,011	-1.4%
Green	0	0	0	0	0	1.5	538	+1.5%

== Ward results ==
Basing
Party	Candidate	Votes	%	±%
Conservative	Sven Godesden	1,724	55.2	+10.3
Liberal Democrats	Alan Read	1,239	39.6	−15.5
Labour	Leslie Clarke	162	5.2	+5.2
Majority		485	15.6	
Turnout		3,125	49	+1
Conservative gain from Liberal Democrats		Swing		

Brighton Hill North
Party	Candidate	Votes	%	±%
Liberal Democrats	Sheila Rowland	639	58.9	+4.1
Conservative	Richard Court	317	29.2	−2.9
Labour	Elizabeth Orton	129	11.9	−1.2
Majority		322	29.7	+7.1
Turnout		1,085	31	−2
Liberal Democrats hold		Swing		

Brighton Hill South
Party	Candidate	Votes	%	±%
Liberal Democrats	John Barnes	471	45.6	+2.3
Conservative	John Loveys Jervoise	303	29.3	+4.8
Labour	Stephen Wyeth	259	25.1	−7.1
Majority		168	16.3	+5.3
Turnout		1,033	27	−5
Liberal Democrats hold		Swing		

Brookvale and Kings Furlong
Party	Candidate	Votes	%	±%
Liberal Democrats	John Shaw	699	52.4	−10.3
Conservative	Hayley Eachus	356	26.7	+5.6
Labour	Philip Courtenay	196	14.7	−1.5
Green	Michael Sparrow	83	6.2	+6.2
Majority		343	25.7	−15.9
Turnout		1,334	35	+8
Liberal Democrats hold		Swing		

Burghclere
Party	Candidate	Votes	%	±%
Conservative	James Lewin	626	69.8	+13.3
Liberal Democrats	Anthony Davies	239	26.6	−16.9
Labour	Patricia Wickremeratne	32	3.6	+3.6
Majority		387	43.1	+30.0
Turnout		897	46	+0
Conservative hold		Swing		

Chineham
Party	Candidate	Votes	%	±%
Independent	Martin Biermann	1,011	54.2	+54.2
Conservative	Rebecca Downes	722	38.7	−28.4
Labour	Eileen Cavanagh	133	7.1	−1.0
Majority		289	15.5	
Turnout		1,866	34	−3
Independent hold		Swing		

East Woodhay
Party	Candidate	Votes	%	±%
Conservative	Clive Sanders	746	82.4	+10.2
Liberal Democrats	Jacqueline Lessware	126	13.9	−13.9
Labour	Upali Wickremeratne	33	3.6	+3.6
Majority		620	68.5	+24.1
Turnout		905	43	+8
Conservative hold		Swing		

Eastrop
Party	Candidate	Votes	%	±%
Liberal Democrats	Graham Parker	639	54.8	+2.1
Conservative	Gordon Pirie	308	26.4	−8.1
Labour	Philip Howe	129	11.1	−1.7
Green	Darren Shirley	90	7.7	+7.7
Majority		331	28.4	+10.2
Turnout		1,166	36	−5
Liberal Democrats hold		Swing		

Grove
Party	Candidate	Votes	%	±%
Liberal Democrats	Ronald Hussey	1,267	61.6	+10.3
Conservative	Robert Taylor	697	33.9	−6.4
Labour	Hema Krishan	93	4.5	−3.8
Majority		570	27.7	−13.7
Turnout		2,057	47	+6
Liberal Democrats hold		Swing		

Hatch Warren and Beggarwood
Party	Candidate	Votes	%	±%
Conservative	Philip Heath	1,460	69.1	+4.1
Liberal Democrats	Roger Barnard	404	19.1	−15.9
Labour	Julie Worthington	249	11.8	+11.8
Majority		1,056	50.0	+19.9
Turnout		2,113	31	−2
Conservative hold		Swing		

Highclere and Bourne
Party	Candidate	Votes	%	±%
Conservative	John Mitchell	779	70.1	+2.9
Liberal Democrats	Pauleen Malone	253	22.8	−10.0
Labour	David Cavangh	80	7.2	+7.2
Majority		526	47.3	+13.0
Turnout		1,112	48	+1
Conservative hold		Swing		

Kempshott
Party	Candidate	Votes	%	±%
Conservative	Wilhelmine Court	1,820	71.6	−0.3
Liberal Democrats	Thomas Mitchell	387	15.2	+15.2
Labour	Colin Regan	336	13.2	−14.9
Majority		1,433	56.4	+12.7
Turnout		2,543	42	+1
Conservative hold		Swing		

Kingsclere
Party	Candidate	Votes	%	±%
Conservative	Kenneth Rhatigan	1,267	79.9	+14.6
Labour	James Gibb	185	11.7	−3.2
Liberal Democrats	Roger Ward	134	8.4	−11.4
Majority		1,082	68.2	+22.7
Turnout		1,586	43	+11
Conservative hold		Swing		

Norden
Party	Candidate	Votes	%	±%
Labour	George Hood	1,023	56.5	+8,4
Conservative	Nigel McNair Scott	527	29.1	−3.1
Liberal Democrats	Richard Whitechurch	261	14.4	−5.3
Majority		496	27.4	+11.6
Turnout		1,811	32	+2
Labour hold		Swing		

Oakley and North Waltham
Party	Candidate	Votes	%	±%
Conservative	Cecilia Morrison	1,616	64.3	−4.4
Liberal Democrats	John Burbidge-King	896	35.7	+12.9
Majority		720	28.7	−17.2
Turnout		2,512	45	+2
Conservative hold		Swing		

Overton, Laverstoke and Steventon
Party	Candidate	Votes	%	±%
Liberal Democrats	Paula Baker	1,152	64.0	+34.9
Conservative	Marion Jones	547	30.4	+18.1
Labour	Warwick Dady	100	5.6	+5.6
Majority		605	33.6	
Turnout		1,799	51	+7
Liberal Democrats hold		Swing		

Pamber
Party	Candidate	Votes	%	±%
Conservative	Keith Chapman	683	73.0	−0.7
Liberal Democrats	Stephen Day	103	11.0	+11.0
Labour	Stephen Rothman	87	9.3	−17.0
Green	Christopher Alliston	62	6.6	+6.6
Majority		580	62.0	+14.6
Turnout		935	44	+5
Conservative hold		Swing		

Popley East
Party	Candidate	Votes	%	±%
Labour	Mary Brian	490	51.7	+23.8
Conservative	Stephen McConnell	300	31.6	+19.2
Liberal Democrats	Michael Berwick-Gooding	158	16.7	+11.0
Majority		190	20.1	
Turnout		948	29	−4
Labour gain from Liberal Democrats		Swing		

South Ham
Party	Candidate	Votes	%	±%
Labour	Gerald Traynor	1,056	53.4	+7.1
Conservative	Ronald Collins	703	35.5	−0.1
Liberal Democrats	Stephen Whitechurch	220	11.1	−7.0
Majority		353	17.8	+7.1
Turnout		1,979	36	+2
Labour hold		Swing		

Whitchurch (2)
Party	Candidate	Votes	%	±%
Liberal Democrats	Alison Wall	968		
Liberal Democrats	John Wall	859		
Conservative	William Judge	711		
Conservative	Henry Du Val de Beaulieu	612		
Green	Paul Skinner	180		
Green	Stephen Climpson	123		
Labour	Roger Bailey	69		
Labour	Stanley Parry	48		
Turnout		3,570	48	+12
Liberal Democrats hold		Swing		
Liberal Democrats hold		Swing		

Winklebury
Party	Candidate	Votes	%	±%
Conservative	Robert Donnell	1,318	62.6	+2.2
Labour	Christopher Connor	789	37.4	−2.2
Majority		529	25.1	+4.2
Turnout		2,107	43	+0
Conservative gain from Labour		Swing		

Preceded by 2004 Basingstoke and Deane Council election	Basingstoke and Deane local elections	Succeeded by 2007 Basingstoke and Deane Council election
