= 2014 Basingstoke and Deane Borough Council election =

2014 UK local government election

← 2012	22 May 2014	2015 →

22 seats of 60 to Basingstoke and Deane Borough Council 31 seats needed for a majority
	First party	Second party
Party	Conservative	Labour
Seats won	29	17
Seat change	-1	+3
	Third party	Fourth party
Party	Liberal Democrats	Independent
Seats won	8	4
Seat change	-3	Steady
Council control before election
Conservative Party (UK)
Council control after election
Conservative Party (UK)

The 2014 Basingstoke and Deane Borough Council election took place on 22 May 2014 to elect members of Basingstoke and Deane Borough Council in England. This was on the same day as other local elections. These elections were postponed from the usual first Thursday of May in order to coincide with the 2014 European Parliamentary Elections.

22 seats out of 60 seats were up for election. Due to the resignation of a councillor elected in 2012, Brighton Hill South had two seats for re-election. The first-placed finisher was elected to a regular four-year term and the second-placed finisher was elected to serve until 2016. Another councillor had stood down in Baughurst and Tadley North, and thus a councillor was elected to fill out the 2011–15 term in that seat.

The Conservatives had lost their majority on the council in 2013 due to defections, and since then had operated a minority administration. They lost a single seat (Buckskin) to Labour and continued their minority administration. In Basing, a councillor who had been elected as a Conservative in 2010 was re-elected as an independent.

== Election Result ==
The Conservative Party performed best with a third of the vote share, but lost one seat to an independent. Labour retained their position as the largest opposition party, gaining three seats from the Liberal Democrats (Brookvale and Kings Furlong, Brighton Hill North and Brighton Hill South). As such, both the Conservatives and the Labour Party won 8 seats in this election, but the Conservatives remained the largest party overall, with 29 seats compared to Labours 17. UKIP won their first elected seat on the council, gaining the second seat in Brighton Hill South that had been vacated by Labour. Alongside the one independent gain, Ian Tilbury held his seat in Overton, Laverstoke and Steventon.

Basingstoke and Deane Borough Council election 2014
Party	This election			Full council			This election		
Party	Seats	Net	Seats %	Other	Total	Total %	Votes	Votes %	+/−
Conservative	8	▼1	36.36	21	29	48.33	12,844	33.3	
Labour	8	▲3	36.36	9	17	28.33	8,919	23.1	
UKIP	1	▲1	4.54	1	2	3.33	7,970	20.7	
Liberal Democrats	3	▼3	13.63	5	8	13.33	5,557	14.4	
Independent	2	Steady	9.09	2	4	6.66	3,259	8.5	

== Results by Ward ==
=== Basing ===
Basing
Party	Candidate	Votes	%	±%
Independent	Onnalee Cubitt	1,368	46.7	
Conservative	John Downes	695	23.7	
UKIP	Alan Stone	458	15.6	
Labour	George Severs	212	7.2	
Liberal Democrats	Alan Read	198	6.8	
Turnout		1171		
Independent gain from Conservative		Swing		

=== Baughurst and Tadley North By-election ===
Baughurst and Tadley North (By-election)
Party	Candidate	Votes	%	±%
Conservative	Robert Tate	728	39.6	
Liberal Democrats	Chris Curtis	639	34.8	
UKIP	Angela Watson	315	17.1	
Labour	Mary Brian	156	8.5	
Turnout				
Conservative hold		Swing		

=== Brighton Hill North ===
Brighton Hill North
Party	Candidate	Votes	%	±%
Labour	Mark Taylor	435	32.9	
UKIP	Ann King	362	27.4	
Liberal Democrats	Joseph Henry	274	20.7	
Conservative	Richard Court	251	19.0	
Turnout				
Labour gain from Liberal Democrats		Swing		

=== Brighton Hill South ===
Brighton Hill South (2)
Party	Candidate	Votes	%	±%
Labour	Pamela Lonie	400	33.2	
UKIP	Matt Ellery	349	28.9	
Labour	Daniel O'Loughlin	325		
UKIP	Malik Azam	312		
Conservative	Nicholas Bates	253	21.0	
Conservative	Julia Pooley	220		
Liberal Democrats	John Barnes	204	16.9	
Liberal Democrats	Nicholas Bensilum	147		
Labour gain from Liberal Democrats		Swing		
Labour gain from Liberal Democrats		Swing		
Turnout				

=== Brookvale and Kings Furlong ===
Brookvale and Kings Furlong
Party	Candidate	Votes	%	±%
Labour	Michael Westbrook	593	34.3	
Liberal Democrats	John Shaw	524	30.3	
UKIP	Hugh Sawyer	311	18.0	
Conservative	Rebecca Sanders	302	17.5	
Turnout				
Labour gain from Liberal Democrats		Swing		

=== Buckskin ===
Buckskin
Party	Candidate	Votes	%	±%
Labour	Nigel Pierce	508	32.1	
Conservative	Robert Taylor	458	28.9	
UKIP	Debbie Long	378	23.8	
Liberal Democrats	Paul Bensilum	241	15.2	
Turnout				
Labour gain from Conservative		Swing		

=== Burghclere, Highclere and St Mary Bourne ===
Burghclere, Highclere and St Mary Bourne
Party	Candidate	Votes	%	±%
Conservative	Graham Falconer	1,272	64.6	
UKIP	Stan Tennison	326	16.6	
Labour	Romilla Arber	202	10.3	
Liberal Democrats	Steven Nielson	168	8.5	
Turnout				
Conservative hold		Swing		

=== Chineham ===
Chineham
Party	Candidate	Votes	%	±%
Conservative	Paul Miller	928	35.7	
Independent	Laura Romney	821	31.6	
UKIP	Mark Grainger	510	19.6	
Labour	Julie Pierce	196	7.6	
Liberal Democrats	Louise Hall	141	5.4	
Turnout				
Conservative hold		Swing		

=== East Woodhay ===
East Woodhay
Party	Candidate	Votes	%	±%
Conservative	Clive Sanders	674	70.1	
UKIP	Anne Rushbrooke	152	15.8	
Labour	David Foden	135	14.0	
Turnout				
Conservative hold		Swing		

=== Eastrop ===
Eastrop
Party	Candidate	Votes	%	±%
Liberal Democrats	Gavin James	628	43.4	
Conservative	Ian Smith	292	20.2	
Labour	Sean Murphy	269	18.6	
UKIP	Lucy Hamilton	257	17.8	
Turnout				
Liberal Democrats hold		Swing		

=== Grove ===
Grove
Party	Candidate	Votes	%	±%
Liberal Democrats	Stephen Day	771	41.6	
Conservative	Penny Bates	477	25.7	
UKIP	Nigel Johnson	387	20.9	
Labour	Michael Stockwell	219	11.8	
Turnout				
Liberal Democrats hold		Swing		

=== Hatch Warren and Beggarwood ===
Hatch Warren and Beggarwood
Party	Candidate	Votes	%	±%
Conservative	Terri Reid	1,179	56.0	
UKIP	Phil Heath	483	22.95	
Labour	Zoe Rogers	442	21	
Turnout				
Conservative hold		Swing		

=== Kempshott ===
Kempshott
Party	Candidate	Votes	%	±%
Conservative	Hayley Eachus	1,302	55.8	
UKIP	David White	474	20.3	
Labour	Walter McCormick	385	16.5	
Liberal Democrats	Madeline Hussey	171	7.3	
Turnout				
Conservative hold		Swing		

=== Norden ===
Norden
Party	Candidate	Votes	%	±%
Labour	Laura James	1,148	56.7	
UKIP	Steve James-Bailey	446	22.0	
Conservative	Jim Holder	333	16.5	
Liberal Democrats	Doris Jones	97	4.8	
Turnout				
Labour hold		Swing		

=== Oakley and North Waltham ===
Oakley and North Waltham
Party	Candidate	Votes	%	±%
Conservative	Stuart Frost	1,301	54.4	
UKIP	Peter Johnson	689	28.8	
Labour	Barnaby Wheller	401	16.8	
Turnout				
Conservative hold		Swing		

=== Overton, Laverstoke and Steventon ===
Overton, Laverstoke and Steventon
Party	Candidate	Votes	%	±%
Independent	Ian Tilbury	1,070	59.0	
Conservative	Marion Jones	343	18.9	
Liberal Democrats	Robert Cooper	162	8.9	
UKIP	Richard Miller	154	8.5	
Labour	Helen Jeffrey	85	4.7	
Turnout				
Independent hold		Swing		

=== Popley East ===
Popley East
Party	Candidate	Votes	%	±%
Labour	David Potter	635	51.3	
UKIP	Peter King	311	25.1	
Conservative	Tristan Robinson	196	15.8	
Liberal Democrats	Michael Berwick-Gooding	96	7.8	
Turnout				
Labour hold		Swing		

=== Popley West ===
Popley West
Party	Candidate	Votes	%	±%
Labour	Paul Frankum	643	54.0	
UKIP	Duncan Stone	289	24.3	
Conservative	Thom Thorp	206	17.3	
Liberal Democrats	Stephen Whitechurch	53	4.5	
Turnout				
Labour hold		Swing		

=== South Ham ===
South Ham
Party	Candidate	Votes	%	±%
Labour	Sean Keating	1,017	44.0	
UKIP	Alan Simpson	725	31.4	
Conservative	Brian Simmonds	457	19.8	
Liberal Democrats	Ted Blackmore-Squires	111	4.8	
Turnout				
Labour hold		Swing		

=== Whitchurch ===
Whitchurch
Party	Candidate	Votes	%	±%
Liberal Democrats	Keith Watts	1,033	55.6	
Conservative	Tom Thacker	469	25.3	
UKIP	Simon Hession	203	10.9	
Labour	Colin Phillimore	152	8.2	
Turnout				
Liberal Democrats hold		Swing		

=== Winklebury ===
Winklebury
Party	Candidate	Votes	%	±%
Conservative	Laura Edwards	728	39.3	
Labour	Lea Jeff	686	37.1	
UKIP	John Kearney	391	21.1	
Liberal Democrats	Richard Whitechurch	46	2.5	
Turnout				
Conservative hold		Swing		
