= 1998 Basingstoke and Deane Borough Council election =

1998 UK local government election

The 1998 Basingstoke and Deane Council election took place on 7 May 1998 to elect members of Basingstoke and Deane Borough Council in Hampshire, England. One third of the council was up for election and the council stayed under no overall control.

After the election, the composition of the council was:

- Conservative 25
- Labour 15
- Liberal Democrats 13
- Independent 4

== Campaign ==
Before the election the Conservatives had 22 seats, compared to 17 for the Liberal Democrats and 14 for Labour. However Liberal Democrat Paula Baker was leader of the council in an alliance with the Labour Party.

An important issue in the election was development, with opposition to the building of more houses in the area. The national Conservative leader William Hague visited Oakley during the campaign with his party attacking the building of homes in green field areas. The Liberal Democrats accepted there needed to be houses built in the area, but called for local people to be able to decide where, while Labour criticised the previous Conservative government for the national targets on the number of houses to be built.

Other issues in the election included the performance of the council and council tax levels.

== Election result ==
Basingstoke and Deane local election result 1998
| Party | Seats | Gains | Losses | Net gain/loss | Seats % | Votes % | Votes | +/− |
|---|---|---|---|---|---|---|---|---|
| Conservative | 9 | | | +3 | 45.0 | | | |
| Labour | 5 | | | +1 | 25.0 | | | |
| Liberal Democrats | 5 | | | -4 | 25.0 | | | |
| Independent | 1 | | | 0 | 5.0 | | | |

| Preceded by 1996 Basingstoke and Deane Council election | Basingstoke and Deane local elections | Succeeded by 1999 Basingstoke and Deane Council election |
