= 2007 Basingstoke and Deane Borough Council election =

2007 UK local government election

Results of the 2007 Basingstoke and Deane Borough Council election

The 2007 Basingstoke and Deane Council election took place on 3 May 2007 to elect members of Basingstoke and Deane Borough Council in Hampshire, England. One third of the council was up for election and the Conservative Party stayed in overall control of the council.

After the election, the composition of the council was:

- Conservative 31
- Liberal Democrats 15
- Labour 11
- Independent 3

== Background ==
The Conservative Party had run the council since the 2006 election and won an overall majority for the first time in 11 years after gaining a seat in a by-election in Buckskin from Labour in December 2006. In March 2007 the Conservatives also held a seat in a by-election in Rooksdown. This meant that the Conservative held 31 seats going into the election, compared to 15 Liberal Democrat, 11 Labour and 3 Independent councillors.

5 councillors stood down at the election, 3 Conservatives and 2 Liberal Democrats, Jonathan Curry, Terence Faulkner, Paul Findlow, Alex Green and John Wall. 20 seats were up for election, with the leader of the Conservatives on the council, Mark Ruffell, being unopposed in Upton Grey and the Candovers. Candidates stood from the Conservative, Liberal Democrat and Labour parties, as well as 2 independents.

== Election result ==
The results saw the Conservatives stay in control with 31 seats, with no changes taking place in the political balance on the council. The Liberal Democrats remained on 15 seats, Labour on 11 and independents on 3 seats.

Basingstoke and Deane local election result 2007
Party	Seats	Gains	Losses	Net gain/loss	Seats %	Votes %	Votes	+/−
Conservative	12	0	0	0	60.0	54.4	18,593	+4.7
Labour	4	0	0	0	20.0	18.4	6,282	+2.8
Liberal Democrats	3	0	0	0	15.0	23.6	8,053	-6.9
Independent	1	0	0	0	5.0	3.7	1,250	+0.9

== Ward results ==
Basing
Party	Candidate	Votes	%	±%
Conservative	Stephen Marks	1,864	65.1	+9.9
Liberal Democrats	Anna Archibald	906	31.6	−8.0
Labour	Amal Sarkar	93	3.2	−2.0
Majority		958	33.5	+18.0
Turnout		2,863	44	−5
Conservative hold		Swing		

Brookvale and Kings Furlong
Party	Candidate	Votes	%	±%
Liberal Democrats	Doris Jones	823	56.9	+4.5
Conservative	Ranil Jayawardena	430	29.7	+3.0
Labour	Philip Courtenay	193	13.3	−1.4
Majority		393	27.2	+1.5
Turnout		1,446	36	+1
Liberal Democrats hold		Swing		

Buckskin
Party	Candidate	Votes	%	±%
Conservative	Robert Taylor	539	52.9	+21.0
Labour	Gill Gleeson	387	38.0	−10.8
Liberal Democrats	Obi Nwasike	93	9.1	+9.1
Majority		152	14.9	
Turnout		1,019	31	+6
Conservative hold		Swing		

Calleva
Party	Candidate	Votes	%	±%
Conservative	Roger Gardiner	1,288	78.3	+15.8
Labour	Terence Price	356	21.7	+5.5
Majority		932	56.7	+15.5
Turnout		1,644	38	+0
Conservative hold		Swing		

Chineham
Party	Candidate	Votes	%	±%
Conservative	John Downes	1,258	63.2	+24.5
Independent	Christopher Tomblin	393	19.7	−34.5
Labour	Eileen Cavanagh	191	9.6	+2.5
Liberal Democrats	Janice Spalding	149	7.5	+7.5
Majority		865	43.5	
Turnout		1,991	34	+0
Conservative hold		Swing		

Grove
Party	Candidate	Votes	%	±%
Liberal Democrats	Stephen Day	1,261	66.6	+5.0
Conservative	Hayley Eachus	538	28.4	−5.5
Labour	Hema Krishan	94	5.0	+0.5
Majority		723	38.2	+10.5
Turnout		1,893	43	−4
Liberal Democrats hold		Swing		

Hatch Warren and Beggarwood
Party	Candidate	Votes	%	±%
Conservative	Harry Robinson	1,398	69.6	+0.5
Liberal Democrats	Roger Barnard	363	18.1	−1.0
Labour	Julie Worthington	248	12.3	+0.5
Majority		1,035	51.5	+1.5
Turnout		2,009	29	−2
Conservative hold		Swing		

Kempshott
Party	Candidate	Votes	%	±%
Conservative	Christine Heath	1,749	70.9	−0.7
Liberal Democrats	Tom Mitchell	381	15.5	+0.3
Labour	Colin Regan	336	13.6	+0.4
Majority		1,368	55.5	−0.9
Turnout		2,466	41	−1
Conservative hold		Swing		

Kingsclere
Party	Candidate	Votes	%	±%
Conservative	Cathy Osselton	1,277	78.4	−1.5
Labour	James Gibb	186	11.4	−0.3
Liberal Democrats	Roger Ward	165	10.1	+1.7
Majority		1,091	67.0	−1.2
Turnout		1,628	44	+1
Conservative hold		Swing		

Norden
Party	Candidate	Votes	%	±%
Labour	Paul Harvey	1,057	54.4	−2.1
Conservative	Onnalee Cubitt	615	31.7	+2.6
Liberal Democrats	Richard Whitechurch	270	13.9	−0.5
Majority		442	22.8	−4.6
Turnout		1,942	33	+1
Labour hold		Swing		

Oakley and North Waltham
Party	Candidate	Votes	%	±%
Conservative	Diane Taylor	1,801	74.6	+10.3
Liberal Democrats	John Burbidge-King	442	18.3	−17.4
Labour	David Cavanagh	171	7.1	+7.1
Majority		1,359	56.3	+27.6
Turnout		2,414	43	−2
Conservative hold		Swing		

Overton, Laverstoke and Steventon
Party	Candidate	Votes	%	±%
Independent	Ian Tilbury	857	49.2	+49.2
Conservative	Marion Jones	481	27.6	−2.8
Liberal Democrats	Jacky Lessware	328	18.8	−45.2
Labour	Warwick Dady	76	4.4	−1.2
Majority		376	21.6	
Turnout		1,742	50	−1
Independent hold		Swing		

Popley East
Party	Candidate	Votes	%	±%
Labour	Andy McCormick	629	63.6	+11.9
Conservative	Stephen McConnell	223	22.5	−9.1
Liberal Democrats	Michael Berwick-Gooding	137	13.9	−2.8
Majority		406	41.1	+21.1
Turnout		989	31	+2
Labour hold		Swing		

Popley West
Party	Candidate	Votes	%	±%
Labour	Paul Frankum	534	53.5	+3.9
Conservative	Zoe Wheddon	354	35.4	+6.5
Liberal Democrats	Angela Old	111	11.1	−10.4
Majority		180	18.0	−2.7
Turnout		999	39	+9
Labour hold		Swing		

South Ham
Party	Candidate	Votes	%	±%
Labour	Sean Keating	959	49.4	−4.0
Conservative	Valerie Valentine	741	38.2	+2.7
Liberal Democrats	Stephen Whitechurch	240	12.4	+1.3
Majority		218	11.2	−6.6
Turnout		1,940	35	−1
Labour hold		Swing		

Tadley North
Party	Candidate	Votes	%	±%
Conservative	Stephen West	1,048	55.3	+16.6
Liberal Democrats	Josephine Slimin	732	38.6	−22.7
Labour	Stephen Rothman	114	6.0	+6.0
Majority		316	16.7	
Turnout		1,894	43	+0
Conservative hold		Swing		

Tadley South
Party	Candidate	Votes	%	±%
Conservative	Robert Musson	872	66.1	+26.1
Liberal Democrats	Ian Hankinson	337	25.5	+25.5
Labour	Upali Wickremeratne	110	8.3	−3.7
Majority		535	40.6	
Turnout		1,319	31	−2
Conservative hold		Swing		

Upton Grey and The Candovers
Party	Candidate	Votes	%	±%
Conservative	Mark Ruffell	unopposed		
Conservative hold		Swing		

Whitchurch
Party	Candidate	Votes	%	±%
Liberal Democrats	Keith Watts	1,163	58.4	
Conservative	William Judge	828	41.6	
Majority		335	16.8	
Turnout		1,991	52	+4
Liberal Democrats hold		Swing		

Winklebury
Party	Candidate	Votes	%	±%
Conservative	Rob Golding	1,289	64.8	+2.2
Labour	Lea Jeff	548	27.6	−9.8
Liberal Democrats	Chijioke Nwasike	152	7.6	+7.6
Majority		741	37.3	+12.2
Turnout		1,989	39	−4
Conservative hold		Swing		

Preceded by 2006 Basingstoke and Deane Council election	Basingstoke and Deane local elections	Succeeded by 2008 Basingstoke and Deane Council election
