= 2003 Basingstoke and Deane Borough Council election =

2003 UK local government election

Results of the 2003 Basingstoke and Deane Borough Council election

The 2003 Basingstoke and Deane Council election took place on 1 May 2003 to elect members of Basingstoke and Deane Borough Council in Hampshire, England. One third of the council was up for election and the council stayed under no overall control.

After the election, the composition of the council was:

- Conservative 26
- Liberal Democrats 15
- Labour 15
- Independent 4

== Election result ==
Overall turnout in the election was 30.9%.

Following the election the Labour and Liberal Democrat administration continued to run the council with 15 seats each and 30 of the 60 councillors. However the Labour deputy leader Rob Donnelly took over as leader of the council, replacing Liberal Democrat Brian Gurden who became deputy leader.

Basingstoke and Deane Local Election Result 2003
Party	Seats	Gains	Losses	Net gain/loss	Seats %	Votes %	Votes	+/−
Conservative	11	2	0	+2	55.0	46.2	13,228	+0.4%
Labour	5	0	0	0	25.0	22.9	6,563	+1.0%
Liberal Democrats	3	0	2	-2	15.0	25.3	7,259	-2.5%
Independent	1	0	0	0	5.0	5.6	1,597	+1.2%

== Ward results ==
Basing
Party	Candidate	Votes	%	±%
Conservative	Stephen Marks	1,214	47.1	
Liberal Democrats	Stephen Day	1,153	44.8	
Labour	Pamela Lonie	171	6.6	
Independent	Elsayed Selim	38	1.5	
Majority		61	2.3	
Turnout		2,576	39.5	−2.2
Conservative gain from Liberal Democrats		Swing		

Brookvale & Kings Furlong
Party	Candidate	Votes	%	±%
Liberal Democrats	Doris Jones	668	62.7	
Conservative	Ronald Collins	225	21.1	
Labour	Mary Brian	172	16.2	
Majority		443	41.6	
Turnout		1,065	26.8	−5.3
Liberal Democrats hold		Swing		

Buckskin
Party	Candidate	Votes	%	±%
Labour	David Potter	413	54.1	
Conservative	Stephen McIntyre-Stewart	248	32.5	
Liberal Democrats	Roger Barnard	102	13.4	
Majority		165	21.6	
Turnout		763	21.7	−3.9
Labour hold		Swing		

Calleva
Party	Candidate	Votes	%	±%
Conservative	Roger Gardiner	839	65.1	
Labour	Terence Price	230	17.9	
Liberal Democrats	Janet Renwick	219	17.0	
Majority		609	47.2	
Turnout		1,288	29.5	−0.9
Conservative hold		Swing		

Chineham
Party	Candidate	Votes	%	±%
Conservative	John Downes	826	51.5	
Independent	Christopher Tombin	599	37.3	
Labour	Paul Bartlett	180	11.2	
Majority		227	14.2	
Turnout		1,605	30.3	−3.2
Conservative hold		Swing		

Grove
Party	Candidate	Votes	%	±%
Liberal Democrats	Alexander Green	961	51.3	
Conservative	Richard Clewer	755	40.3	
Labour	Nigel Wooldridge	156	8.3	
Majority		206	11.0	
Turnout		1,872	41.4	−5.3
Liberal Democrats hold		Swing		

Hatch Warren & Beggarwood
Party	Candidate	Votes	%	±%
Conservative	Harold Robinson	905	57.0	
Labour	Jennifer Crawford	505	31.8	
Liberal Democrats	Charles James	179	11.3	
Majority		400	25.2	
Turnout		1,589	26.0	+2.2
Conservative hold		Swing		

Kempshott
Party	Candidate	Votes	%	±%
Conservative	Christine Heath	1,158	57.9	
Labour	Richard Davey	479	24.0	
Liberal Democrats	Mary Shelley	362	18.1	
Majority		679	33.9	
Turnout		1,999	32.5	−6.0
Conservative hold		Swing		

Kingsclere
Party	Candidate	Votes	%	±%
Conservative	Flora Osselton	811	65.3	
Liberal Democrats	Roger Ward	246	19.8	
Labour	James Gibb	185	14.9	
Majority		565	45.5	
Turnout		1,242	31.9	−0.4
Conservative hold		Swing		

Norden
Party	Candidate	Votes	%	±%
Labour	Paul Harvey	761	53.7	
Conservative	Nigel McNair-Scott	386	27.2	
Liberal Democrats	Angela Old	271	19.1	
Majority		375	26.5	
Turnout		1,418	23.5	−2.3
Labour hold		Swing		

Oakley and North Waltham
Party	Candidate	Votes	%	±%
Conservative	Paul Findlow	1,408	79.1	
Labour	Joy Potter	372	20.9	
Majority		1,036	58.2	
Turnout		1,780	31.4	−8.4
Conservative hold		Swing		

Overton, Laverstoke & Steventon
Party	Candidate	Votes	%	±%
Independent	Ian Tilbury	960	58.6	
Liberal Democrats	Lucyna Sloane William	477	29.1	
Conservative	Christopher Van Der Noot	202	12.3	
Majority		483	29.5	
Turnout		1,639	43.9	−3.3
Independent hold		Swing		

Popley East
Party	Candidate	Votes	%	±%
Labour	Andrew McCormick	436	62.1	
Conservative	Carol Gould	151	21.5	
Liberal Democrats	Sheena Grassi	115	16.4	
Majority		285	40.6	
Turnout		702	18.9	−2.4
Labour hold		Swing		

x

Popley West
Party	Candidate	Votes	%	±%
Labour	Paul Frankum	375	57.9	
Conservative	Lindsay Ferns	169	26.1	
Liberal Democrats	Michael Berwick-Gooding	104	16.0	
Majority		206	31.8	
Turnout		648	24.2	−2.3
Labour hold		Swing		

South Ham
Party	Candidate	Votes	%	±%
Labour	Sean Keating	932	61.9	
Conservative	Michael Cohen	360	23.9	
Liberal Democrats	Susan Martin	214	14.2	
Majority		572	38.0	
Turnout		1,506	25.1	−4.2
Labour hold		Swing		

Tadley North
Party	Candidate	Votes	%	±%
Conservative	Stephen West	812	52.2	
Liberal Democrats	Josephine Slimin	601	38.6	
Labour	Tina Absolom	143	9.2	
Majority		211	13.6	
Turnout		1,556	34.0	−3.8
Conservative gain from Liberal Democrats		Swing		

Tadley South
Party	Candidate	Votes	%	±%
Conservative	Terence Faulkner	625	56.0	
Liberal Democrats	Ian Hankinson	330	29.5	
Labour	Robert Cross	162	14.5	
Majority		295	26.5	
Turnout		1,117	25.3	−3.2
Conservative hold		Swing		

Upton Grey and The Candovers
Party	Candidate	Votes	%	±%
Conservative	Mark Ruffell	667	71.6	+1.2
Labour	Ina Green	148	15.9	+2.0
Liberal Democrats	Leonard Clover	116	12.5	−3.1
Majority		519	55.7	+0.9
Turnout		931	42.6	−0.9
Conservative hold		Swing		

Whitchurch
Party	Candidate	Votes	%	±%
Liberal Democrats	Gillian Nethercott	810	56.6	
Conservative	James Kneller	536	37.4	
Labour	Sarah Hamlin	86	6.0	
Majority		274	19.2	
Turnout		1,432	36.1	−2.6
Liberal Democrats hold		Swing		

Wicklebury
Party	Candidate	Votes	%	±%
Conservative	Jonathan Curry	931	48.5	
Labour	Gary Watts	657	34.2	
Liberal Democrats	Roger Blackmore-Squires	331	17.2	
Majority		274	14.3	
Turnout		1,919	36.1	−2.2
Conservative hold		Swing		

Preceded by 2002 Basingstoke and Deane Council election	Basingstoke and Deane local elections	Succeeded by 2004 Basingstoke and Deane Council election
