= 2002 Basingstoke and Deane Borough Council election =

2002 UK local government election

← 2000	2 May 2002	2003 →

all 60 seats to Basingstoke and Deane Borough Council 31 seats needed for a majority
- Turnout: 34.3%
	First party	Second party
Party	Conservative	Liberal Democrats
Seats won	25	17
Popular vote	38,344	23,289
Percentage	45.8%	27.8%
	Third party	Fourth party
Party	Labour	Independent
Seats won	15	3
Popular vote	18,312	3,702
Percentage	21.9%	4.4%
- Results of the 2002 Basingstoke and Deane Borough Council election
Council control before election
No overall control
Council control after election
No overall control

The 2002 Basingstoke and Deane Council election took place on 2 May 2002 to elect members of Basingstoke and Deane Borough Council in Hampshire, England. The whole council was up for election with boundary changes since the last election in 2000, increasing the number of seats by 3. The council stayed under no overall control.

== Background ==
Before the election, the Labour and Liberal Democrat parties had jointly run the council for the previous 7 years. Since the 2000 election, both parties have had 15 seats, resulting in dividing 4 cabinet seats each and shared the leadership of the council for 6 months each.

Boundary changes increased the number of seats to 60 from the previous 57. This meant all of the seats were being contested instead of the usual one-third of the council.

The Conservatives hoped to take control of the council and the local party gained support from the national Conservative leader Iain Duncan Smith and the party chairman David Davis. The Conservatives said their campaign focused on issues such as youth crime, but were accused by the Liberal Democrat leader of the council, Brian Gurden, of running a negative campaign.

== Election results ==
The election results saw the Conservatives remain the largest party, maintaining their count of 25 seats. As a result, the Liberal Democrat and Labour coalition remained in control of the council with 32 of the 60 seats between them.

The Liberal Democrats made a net gain of 2 seats, after picking up 3 seats and losing 1. This included taking seats in Eastrop and Tadley North from other parties and meant the Liberal Democrats had 17 seats, compared to 15 for Labour. As a result, Liberal Democrat Brian Gurden remained as leader of the council.

Meanwhile, both sitting independent councillors were re-elected and a third, Ian Tilbury, gained a seat in Overton. 4 sitting councillors were defeated at the election, 3 Labour, Pam Lonie, Carl Reader and Rose Wellman, and 1 Conservative, Robert Musson. Overall turnout in the election was 34.3%, an increase from 29% in 2000.

Basingstoke and Deane local election result 2002
Party	Seats	Gains	Losses	Net gain/loss	Seats %	Votes %	Votes	+/−
Conservative	25			0	41.7	45.8	38,344	
Liberal Democrats	17			+2	28.3	27.8	23,289	
Labour	15			0	25.0	21.9	18,312	
Independent	3			+1	5.0	4.4	3,702	

== Ward results ==
Basing (3)
Party	Candidate	Votes	%	±%
Liberal Democrats	Alan Reid	1,511	19.6	
Liberal Democrats	Patricia Read	1,387	18.0	
Liberal Democrats	Stephen Day	1,260	16.3	
Conservative	Stephen Marks	1,195	15.5	
Conservative	James Holder	1,181	15.3	
Conservative	Hazel Kennedy	1,173	15.2	
Turnout		7,707	41.7	

Baughurst
Party	Candidate	Votes	%	±%
Conservative	Sheila Allen	496	65.4	
Liberal Democrats	Robert Winfield	262	34.6	
Majority		234	30.9	
Turnout		758	39.1	

Brighton Hill North (2)
Party	Candidate	Votes	%	±%
Liberal Democrats	Sheila Rowland	597		
Liberal Democrats	Brian Gurden	592		
Conservative	Deborah Burns	326		
Conservative	Lynda Coyde	326		
Labour	Mark Bennett	145		
Labour	Charles James	130		
Turnout		2,116	29.2	

Brighton Hill South (2)
Party	Candidate	Votes	%	±%
Liberal Democrats	John Barnes	495		
Labour	Thomas Millar	480		
Liberal Democrats	Kevin Oxlade	474		
Labour	Carl Reader	460		
Conservative	Richard Court	241		
Conservative	Jill Reed	204		
Turnout		2,354	29.2	

Brookvale & Kings Furlong (2)
Party	Candidate	Votes	%	±%
Liberal Democrats	John Shaw	744		
Liberal Democrats	Doris Jones	731		
Labour	Daryl Rennie	268		
Labour	Pamela Lonie	252		
Conservative	Christine Heath	241		
Conservative	Michael Cohen	232		
Turnout		2,468	32.1	

Buckskin (2)
Party	Candidate	Votes	%	±%
Labour	Antony Jones	577		
Labour	David Potter	554		
Conservative	Stephen McIntyre-Stewart	302		
Conservative	Peter Dalton	280		
Turnout		1,713	25.6	

Burghclere
Party	Candidate	Votes	%	±%
Conservative	John Clegg	574	81.8	
Liberal Democrats	Anthony Davies	128	18.2	
Majority		446	63.5	
Turnout		702	35.7	

Calleva (2)
Party	Candidate	Votes	%	±%
Conservative	Marilyn Tucker	841		
Conservative	Roger Gardiner	839		
Liberal Democrats	Roger Barnard	236		
Liberal Democrats	Joyce Protheroe	212		
Labour	Leslie Clarke	189		
Labour	Katherine Cumming	181		
Turnout		2,498	30.4	

Chineham (3)
Party	Candidate	Votes	%	±%
Independent	Martin Biermann	1,101		
Conservative	Elaine Still	858		
Conservative	John Downes	675		
Conservative	Thomas Bursnall	614		
Liberal Democrats	Susan Martin	240		
Labour	Eileen Cavanagh	209		
Liberal Democrats	Angela Old	194		
Labour	Upali Wickremeratne	154		
Turnout		4,045	33.5	

East Woodhay
Party	Candidate	Votes	%	±%
Conservative	Alexander Ross	538	72.2	
Liberal Democrats	Philip Knight	207	27.8	
Majority		331	44.4	
Turnout		745	34.6	

Eastrop (2)
Party	Candidate	Votes	%	±%
Liberal Democrats	Graham Parker	616		
Liberal Democrats	Erica Shaw	570		
Conservative	Ronald Collins	397		
Conservative	Christopher Jones	375		
Labour	Julie Johnson	185		
Labour	Terence Jones	172		
Turnout		2,315	37.7	

Grove (2)
Party	Candidate	Votes	%	±%
Liberal Democrats	Ronald Hussey	1,304		
Liberal Democrats	Alexander Green	1,216		
Conservative	Penelope Bates	805		
Conservative	Richard Clewer	767		
Turnout		4,092	46.7	

Hatch Warren & Beggarwood (3)
Party	Candidate	Votes	%	±%
Conservative	Philip Heath	894		
Conservative	Dan Putty	884		
Conservative	Harold Robinson	791		
Liberal Democrats	Mary Shelley	236		
Labour	Philip Courtenay	235		
Labour	Mark Jeffery	218		
Liberal Democrats	Cynthia Oliver	205		
Labour	Clarence Street	192		
Liberal Democrats	Peter Janes	191		
Turnout		3,846	23.8	

Highclere and Bourne
Party	Candidate	Votes	%	±%
Conservative	Timothy Jardine	725	66.0	
Liberal Democrats	Keith Watts	373	34.0	
Majority		352	32.1	
Turnout		1,098	47.4	

Kempshott (3)
Party	Candidate	Votes	%	±%
Conservative	Wilhelmine Court	1,467		
Conservative	Rita Burgess	1,369		
Conservative	Peter Lewington	1,353		
Labour	Richard Davey	598		
Labour	Helen Jeffery	429		
Labour	Philip Devine	415		
Liberal Democrats	Jennifer Crawford	411		
Liberal Democrats	Nicola Hicken	378		
Turnout		6,420	38.5	

Kingslere (2)
Party	Candidate	Votes	%	±%
Conservative	Alan Denness	879		
Conservative	Rose Wellman	809		
Liberal Democrats	Elizabeth Peplow	263		
Liberal Democrats	Roger Ward	194		
Labour	John Jackson	140		
Labour	Robert Cross	133		
Turnout		2,418	32.3	

Norden (3)
Party	Candidate	Votes	%	±%
Labour	George Hood	909		
Labour	Laura James	906		
Labour	Paul Harvey	796		
Conservative	Nigel McNair-Scott	404		
Liberal Democrats	Peter Harris	389		
Conservative	Jervoise Loveys	363		
Conservative	Gordon Pirie	339		
Turnout		4,106	25.8	

Oakley and North Waltham (3)
Party	Candidate	Votes	%	±%
Conservative	Cecilia Morrison	1,448		
Conservative	Gweneth Richardson	1,353		
Conservative	Paul Findlow	1,333		
Independent	Marvin Gregory	681		
Liberal Democrats	Jane Baker	432		
Liberal Democrats	Jacqueline Lessware	360		
Labour	Joy Potter	262		
Labour	Warwick Dady	252		
Turnout		6,121	39.8	

Overton, Laverstoke & Steventon (2)
Party	Candidate	Votes	%	±%
Liberal Democrats	Paula Baker	976		
Independent	Ian Tilbury	859		
Liberal Democrats	Williams Sloane	594		
Conservative	Melvin Byles	407		
Conservative	Christopher Van Der Noot	242		
Independent	Stanley Bray	159		
Labour	Elizabeth Freemantle	90		
Labour	David Cavanagh	89		
Turnout		3,416	47.2	

Pamber
Party	Candidate	Votes	%	±%
Conservative	Keith Chapman	620	73.7	
Labour	Stephen Rothman	221	26.3	
Majority		399	47.4	
Turnout		841	39.0	

Popley East (2)
Party	Candidate	Votes	%	±%
Labour	Robert Donnelly	467		
Labour	Andrew McCormick	412		
Conservative	Carol Gould	179		
Conservative	Rebecca Downes	174		
Liberal Democrats	Richard Damant	146		
Liberal Democrats	Sheena Grassi	118		
Turnout		1,496	21.3	

Popley West (2)
Party	Candidate	Votes	%	±%
Labour	Jane Frankum	477		
Labour	Paul Frankum	388		
Conservative	Graham Conner	176		
Conservative	Karen Dignan	156		
Liberal Democrats	Michael Berwick-Gooding	141		
Turnout		1,338	26.5	

Rooksdown
Party	Candidate	Votes	%	±%
Conservative	Susan Peters	189	69.7	
Labour	Stanley Parry	82	30.3	
Majority		107	39.5	
Turnout		271	30.7	

Sherborne St John
Party	Candidate	Votes	%	±%
Conservative	John Leek	684	80.9	
Labour	Katherine Lomas	161	19.1	
Majority		523	61.9	
Turnout		845	35.7	

South Ham (3)
Party	Candidate	Votes	%	±%
Labour	Gerald Taynor	1,068		
Labour	Colin Regan	1,058		
Labour	Sean Keating	1,028		
Conservative	Anthony Kirby	455		
Conservative	Justin Hereford	453		
Conservative	Christopher Ling	431		
Liberal Democrats	Janet Renwick	211		
Liberal Democrats	Gavin Pomfret	170		
Liberal Democrats	Stephen Whitechurch	157		
Turnout		5,031	29.3	

Tadley North (2)
Party	Candidate	Votes	%	±%
Liberal Democrats	Warwick Lovegrove	995		
Liberal Democrats	Josephine Slimin	928		
Conservative	Robert Musson	723		
Conservative	Stephen West	686		
Turnout		3,332	37.8	

Tadley South (2)
Party	Candidate	Votes	%	±%
Independent	David Leeks	902		
Conservative	Terence Faulkner	724		
Labour	James Gibb	310		
Turnout		1,936	28.5	

Upton Grey and The Candovers
Party	Candidate	Votes	%	±%
Conservative	Mark Ruffell	657	70.4	
Liberal Democrats	Leonard Clover	146	15.6	
Labour	John Rogers	130	13.9	
Majority		511	54.8	
Turnout		933	43.5	

Whitchurch (2)
Party	Candidate	Votes	%	±%
Liberal Democrats	Alison Wall	956		
Liberal Democrats	Gillian Nethercott	905		
Conservative	Therese Coffey	463		
Conservative	Lucinda Henzell-Thomas	436		
Labour	Pauline Courtenay	96		
Labour	Patricia Wickremeratne	68		
Turnout		2,924	38.7	

Wicklebury (3)
Party	Candidate	Votes	%	±%
Labour	Christopher Connor	971		
Labour	Lea Jeff	907		
Conservative	Jonathan Curry	874		
Conservative	Hayley Eachus	873		
Conservative	Andrew Giles	851		
Labour	Gary Watts	848		
Liberal Democrats	Roger Blackmore-Squires	248		
Liberal Democrats	Stephen Adams	190		
Turnout		5,762	38.3	

Preceded by 2000 Basingstoke and Deane Council election	Basingstoke and Deane local elections	Succeeded by 2003 Basingstoke and Deane Council election
