= Rooksdown =

Civil parish in Hampshire, England

Coordinates: 51.282°N 01.12°W

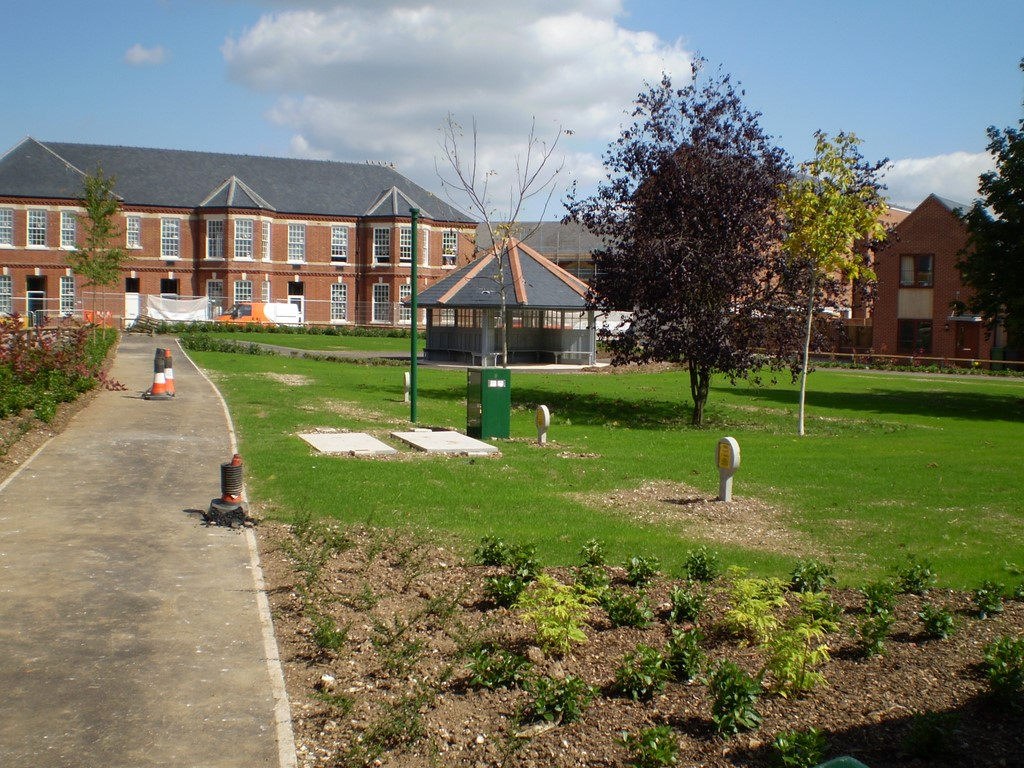
- A view of the redeveloped Park Prewett Hospital buildings. Now used for housing in Rooksdown

- Location within Hampshire
- OS grid reference: SU6155
- District: Basingstoke and Deane
- Shire county: Hampshire
- Region: South East
- Country: England
- Sovereign state: United Kingdom
- Post town: BASINGSTOKE
- Postcode district: RG24
- Dialling code: 01256
- Police: Hampshire and Isle of Wight
- Fire: Hampshire and Isle of Wight
- Ambulance: South Central
- UK Parliament: Basingstoke
- Website: Rooksdown parish council

Rooksdown is a civil parish in the Basingstoke and Deane district of Hampshire, England. The parish was formed on 1 April 2004. It covers a small estate in the north-west of Basingstoke which was previously part of the parish of Sherborne St. John, itself originally part of the Vyne estate.

== History ==
Rooksdown is the name of the locality and is shown as Rooks Down in the Ogilby strip maps of 1675. It is also the name of the old Roman road that passes through the Parish, and of the now demolished Rooksdown Hospital, originally Rooksdown House (the Private annexe of Park Prewett Hospital), which once occupied the north west corner of the parish at the junction of Kingsclere Road and Rooksdown Road.

The land which Rooksdown parish now occupies was originally part of the grounds of the former Park Prewett Hospital and farm. After the hospital closed in 1997, some small development took place on surrounding land. The main hospital site was acquired by English Partnerships in 2005 for the purposes of redeveloping the area. The original clock tower, water tower and entertainment hall have been retained as they are listed buildings.

The local housing development is still sometimes referred to as Park Village by local estate agents, although this is no longer the name of the locality. The area is currently undergoing a major development centred on the former Park Prewett Hospital. This is being refurbished to provide a number of housing units and community shops and facilities. Part of the development is designated to provide affordable homes.

There a four areas of housing development in Rooksdown that have been built at various stages. The first and oldest development is the Beeches, this development lies nearest the single carriageway section of the A339 and contains Saxonwood School. The second development phase was originally known as Rooksdown to differentiate from The Beeches. This development follows on from The Beeches following the line of the old Rooksdown Lane meeting up at the top of the old hospital golf course. The third phase is Park Village, a large estate built on the line of the dual carriageway section of the A339, extending up to the edge of the old Park Prewett Hospital. The current development is known as Limes Park and is a huge area of development encompassing new build and the redevelopment of the Park Prewett Hospital buildings. Collectively this area is known as Rookdown following the creation of the parish.

== Governance ==
Rooksdown is a civil parish and ward of Basingstoke and Deane borough council. The borough council is a Non-metropolitan district of Hampshire County Council.

== Landmarks ==
The water tower and main hall of the former mental asylum are being renovated before being made available for local use. The former Park Prewett Farm barn is a grade II listed building. The North Hampshire Hospital and Parklands Hospital also falls within the parish of Rooksdown, as does the South Central Ambulance Service ambulance station.

== Transport ==
The parish is served by Hampshire Bus who provide frequent services from the North Hampshire Hospital (service 2 and 5, east of the parish) and Winklebury (service 6, west of the parish) to Basingstoke town centre. An infrequent circular service (4) passes through the parish linking it to other parts of the borough. The main Basingstoke to Newbury service (The Link) was diverted through the parish in 2008.
