= Park Prewett Hospital =

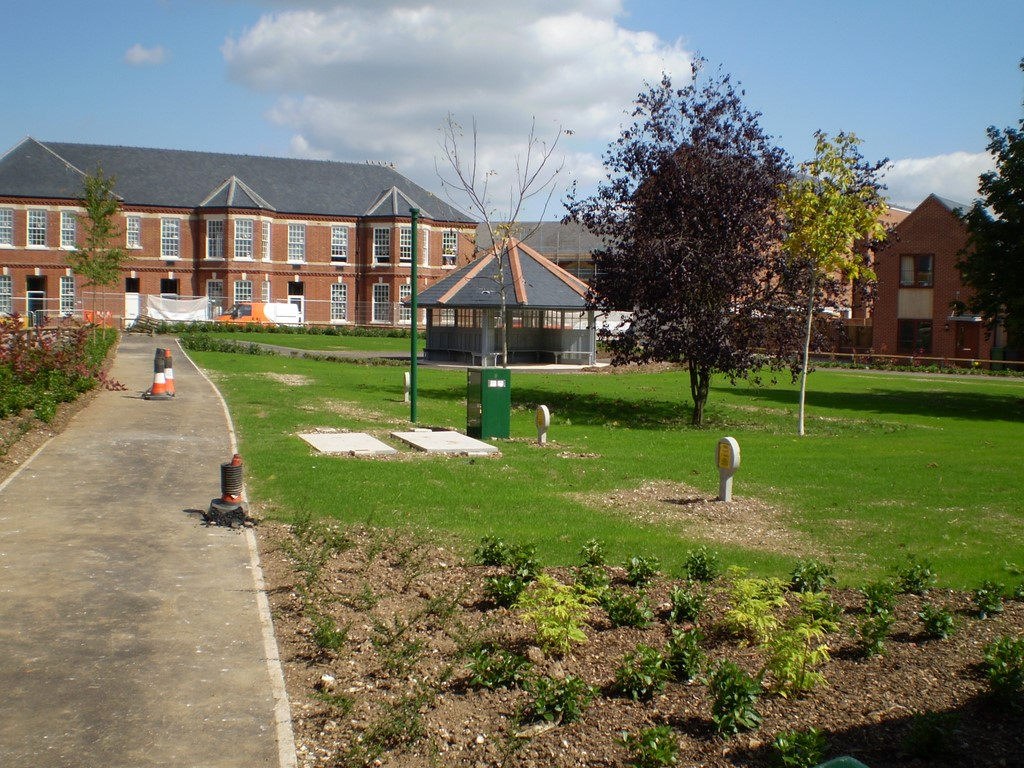
- A view of the redeveloped Park Prewett Hospital buildings. Now used for housing in Rooksdown.

- Shown in Hampshire

Geography
- Location: Basingstoke, Hampshire, England, United Kingdom
- Coordinates: 51.2803°N 1.1191°W

Organisation
- Care system: Public NHS
- Type: Psychiatric

History
- Founded: 1917
- Closed: 1997

Links
- Lists: Hospitals in England

Park Prewett Hospital was a psychiatric hospital northwest of Basingstoke, in the county of Hampshire in England, which operated from 1917 until 1997.

== History ==
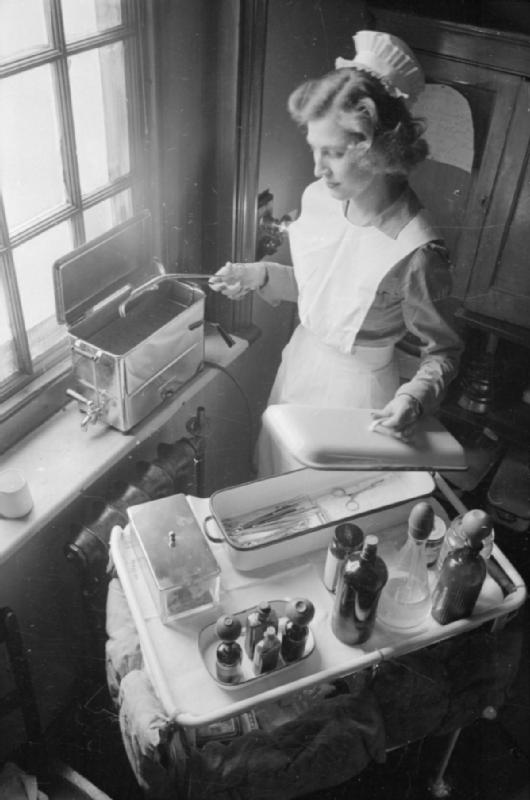
A nurse at Park Prewett Hospital in 1941

Park Prewett was an enclosure dating back to the time of Edward I. Following a report by the Lunacy Commission into overcrowding at Knowle Hospital in the south of the county, a new site was required to house the expanding population. Park Prewett Farm was selected and then acquired in 1899.

The hospital was designed by George Thomas Hine but, because of a delay caused by a reduction in demand for mental health services in the county, construction did not commence until 1913. The works which were carried out by Thomas Rowbotham progressed slowly because of shortage of labour during the First World War but were completed in 1917. The building was first used by the Canadian Army Medical Corps as a military convalescent hospital. It was known as 'Number Four Canadian General Hospital'.

The facility re-opened as Park Prewett Mental Hospital in 1921 and catered for 1,400 patients by 1939. John Arlott worked as a records clerk at the hospital for four years, from 1930 till 1934. The hospital returned to military use again during the Second World War. Part of the hospital, Rooksdown House, was used by Sir Harold Gillies, the pioneering plastic surgeon. It was originally the private wing of the Asylum but became a plastic surgery unit in 1940.

The facility joined the National Health Service as Park Prewett Hospital in 1948. Following the introduction of Care in the Community in the early 1980s the hospital went into a period of decline and ultimately closed in 1997.

Park Prewett was bought by English Partnerships in 2005. They appointed Taylor Woodrow as developers for most new building on the site, and Thomas Homes for conversion of many of the old hospital blocks into housing and community facilities. The new housing development was called "Limes Park" and formed the core of a new civil parish named Rooksdown.

== Railway line ==
The hospital was served by its own railway line from 1913 until 1954 from a junction on the South West Main Line 1 mile (1.6 km) west of Basingstoke railway station.
