= Beggarwood =

Suburb of Basingstoke, Hampshire, England

Coordinates: 51.237163°N 1.124491°W

- Location within Hampshire
- OS grid reference: SU612490
- District: Basingstoke and Deane
- Shire county: Hampshire
- Region: South East
- Country: England
- Sovereign state: United Kingdom
- Post town: BASINGSTOKE
- Postcode district: RG22, RG23
- Dialling code: 01256
- Police: Hampshire and Isle of Wight
- Fire: Hampshire and Isle of Wight
- Ambulance: South Central
- UK Parliament: Basingstoke

Beggarwood is a housing estate of Basingstoke, in the English county of Hampshire. The estate is located approximately 2.5 miles (4.0 km) south-west of Basingstoke town centre. It was built almost completely in one phase between 2001 and 2009. A 96-plot of houses called The Fairways was completed in 2019. There is a shop, an estate agent, a nursery, a pharmacy, a dentist, a doctors' surgery, on Broadmere Road.

An area of land near the A30 called The Island Site was recently developed. It contains The Holly Blue pub, the Dashwood Manor Care Home, specialist care facility, and residential apartments. The land for the originally-proposed dentist has been sold off and no work is being done there currently.

== Beggarwood Woodland Park ==
The Beggarwood Woodland Park is to the north of the estate. There is a play area within the park, which was built in 2010. It was expanded with 30 new items in 2020 including more inclusive pieces of equipment, at a cost of £258,000. A wild zone and an upgraded pump track circuit for BMX and mountain bikers, skateboarders, rollerbladers and scooter riders, also opened in 2021.

Beggarwood Park also contains allotments.

The Old Down & Beggarwood Wildlife Group is encouraging chalk land flora to grow in the park.

== Beggarwood Community Centre ==
A new Community Centre for Beggarwood was built in 2018. It is located on the edge of Beggarwood Park, next to the nursery. It contains a brand new cafe, called Cafe In The Park.

== Basingstoke Golf Club ==
The former Basingstoke Golf Club lies to the north west of the Beggarwood estate. The club was established in 1907 in the grounds of Kempshott House. Kempshott House was demolished in the 1960s, to make way for the Kempshott estate and the M3 motorway. The land is now being developed for approximately 1000 homes.

== Public Transport ==
The Stagecoach Buses no 8 & 12 serve the Beggarwood estate. See the Stagecoach site for timetables
