= 2012 Basingstoke and Deane Borough Council election =

2012 UK local government election

- 3 May 2012

20 seats of 60 to Basingstoke and Deane Borough Council 31 seats needed for a majority
- Turnout: 67.5%
	First party	Second party
Party	Conservative	Labour
Seats won	32	14
Seat change	-2	+3
Popular vote	12,904	8,388
Percentage	44.6%	29.0%
	Third party	Fourth party
Party	Liberal Democrats	Independent
Seats won	11	3
Seat change	-2	1
Popular vote	4,890	2,045
Percentage	16.6%	7.1%
Council control before election
Conservative Party (UK)
Council control after election
Conservative Party (UK)

The 2012 Basingstoke and Deane Council election was held on 3 May 2012 to elect members of Basingstoke and Deane Borough Council in Hampshire, England. 21 out of 60 seats were up for reelection; Popley East had two council seats up for reelection. The Conservative Party retained control of the council with 32 out of 60 seats, losing one seat to the Labour Party in Buckskin and losing another seat in Bramley and Sherfield to an Independent. Labour overtook the Liberal Democrats to become the largest opposition party and won two seats from them in Brighton Hill South and Brookvale and Kings Furlong.

== Election result ==
Basingstoke and Deane local election result 2012
Party	Seats	Gains	Losses	Net gain/loss	Seats %	Votes %	Votes	+/−
Conservative	32	0	2	-2	53.3	44.6	12,904	
Labour	14	3	0	+3	23.3	29.0	8,388	
Liberal Democrats	11	0	2	-2	18.3	16.6	4,890	
Independent	3	1	0	+1	5.1	7.1	2,045	
UKIP	0	0	0	0	0.0	2.6	755	
Green	0	0	0	0	0.0	0.1	38	

== Ward results ==
=== Basing ===
Basing
Party	Candidate	Votes	%	±%
Conservative	Sven Godesen	1,676	73.2	
Labour	Stephen Drake	321	14.0	
Liberal Democrats	Barbara Cummins	290	12.7	
Turnout		2287		
Conservative hold		Swing		

=== Baughurst and Tadley North ===
Baughurst and Tadley North
Party	Candidate	Votes	%	±%
Liberal Democrats	Mike Bound	645	43.4	
Conservative	Robert Tate	636	42.8	
Labour	David Carr	205	13.8	
Turnout		1486		
Liberal Democrats hold		Swing		

=== Bramley and Sherfield ===
Bramley and Sherfield
Party	Candidate	Votes	%	±%
Independent	Chris Tomblin	776	51.9	
Conservative	Rhydiain Vaughn	603	40.4	
Labour	Nigel Pierce	115	7.7	
Turnout		1494		
Independent gain from Conservative		Swing		

=== Brighton Hill South ===
Brighton Hill South
Party	Candidate	Votes	%	±%
Labour	David Eyre	484	41.3	
Liberal Democrats	Kevin Harkness	338	28.9	
UKIP	David Watson	168	14.3	
Conservative	John Downes	143	12.2	
Green	Christopher Appleby	38	3.2	
Turnout		1171		
Labour gain from Liberal Democrats		Swing		

=== Brookvale and Kings Furlong ===
Brookvale and Kings Furlong
Party	Candidate	Votes	%	±%
Labour	Jack Cousens	541	38.6	
Liberal Democrats	Doris Jones	433	30.9	
Conservative	Rebecca Sanders	222	15.8	
UKIP	Alan Stone	205	14.6	
Turnout		1401		
Labour gain from Liberal Democrats		Swing		

=== Buckskin ===
Buckskin
Party	Candidate	Votes	%	±%
Labour	Tony Jones	506	43.6	
Conservative	Stephen Reid	454	39.1	
Independent	Ray Dobing	159	13.7	
Liberal Democrats	Thomas Mitchell	43	3.7	
Turnout		1162		
Labour gain from Conservative		Swing		

=== Chineham ===
Chineham
Party	Candidate	Votes	%	±%
Conservative	Elaine Still	900	46.9	
Independent	Jo Walke	735	38.3	
Labour	Ann Chapman	183	9.5	
Liberal Democrats	Liam Elvish	100	5.2	
Turnout		1918		
Conservative hold		Swing		

=== Hatch Warren and Beggarwood ===
Hatch Warren and Beggarwood
Party	Candidate	Votes	%	±%
Conservative	Dan Putty	914	58.0	
Labour	Carl Reader	253	16.0	
Liberal Democrats	Ruth Day	214	13.6	
UKIP	John Kearney	196	12.4	
Turnout		1577		
Conservative hold		Swing		

=== Kempshott ===
Kempshott
Party	Candidate	Votes	%	±%
Conservative	Anne Court	1,296	71.1	
Labour	Walter McCormick	361	19.8	
Liberal Democrats	Stav O'Doherty	165	9.1	
Turnout		1822		
Conservative hold		Swing		

=== Kingsclere ===
Kingsclere
Party	Candidate	Votes	%	±%
Conservative	Cathy Osselton	823	68.9	
Labour	John Rodway	372	31.1	
Turnout		1195		
Conservative hold		Swing		

=== Norden ===
Norden
Party	Candidate	Votes	%	±%
Labour	Paul Harvey	1,100	72.2	
Conservative	Kenneth Rhatigan	272	17.8	
Liberal Democrats	Louise Hall	160	10.4	
Turnout		1532		
Labour hold		Swing		

=== Oakley and North Waltham ===
Oakley and North Waltham
Party	Candidate	Votes	%	±%
Conservative	Diane Taylor	1,422	74.0	
Labour	Barnaby Wheller	322	16.8	
Liberal Democrats	Robert Cooper	177	9.2	
Turnout		1921		
Conservative hold		Swing		

=== Pamber and Silchester ===
Pamber and Silchester
Party	Candidate	Votes	%	±%
Conservative	Roger Gardiner	837	59.7	
Independent	Steve Spillane	375	26.7	
Labour	Terry Price	190	13.6	
Turnout		1402		
Conservative hold		Swing		

=== Popley East ===
Popley East had two seats up for re-election due to a vacancy. Thus, unlike the other wards, it elected councillors with plurality at-large voting rather than first past the post. If the top candidate method is used to gauge the number of votes for party (i.e. assuming the number of votes in support of a party is equal to the number of votes for its most popular candidate) instead of the raw vote, then the party's vote shares are: Labour 72.3%, Conservatives 16.2% and Liberal Democrats 11.4%.

]

Popley East (2)
Party	Candidate	Votes	%	±%
Labour	Vivien Washbourne	651	39.6	
Labour	David Potter	607	36.9	
Conservative	Richard Court	146	8.9	
Conservative	Laura Edwards	139	8.4	
Liberal Democrats	Michael Berwick-Gooding	103	6.3	
Turnout		1646 (by 879 voters)		
Labour hold		Swing		

=== Popley West ===
Popley West
Party	Candidate	Votes	%	±%
Labour	Jane Frankum	632	76.1	
Conservative	Paul Watts	142	17.1	
Liberal Democrats	Steven Whitechurch	56	6.7	
Turnout		830		
Labour hold		Swing		

=== Rooksdown ===
Rooksdown
Party	Candidate	Votes	%	±%
Conservative	Karen Cherrett	246	58.0	
Labour	Alice James	119	28.1	
Liberal Democrats	Richard Whitechurch	30	7.1	
UKIP	Ann Williams	29	6.8	
Turnout		424		
Conservative hold		Swing		

=== Sherbourne St John ===
Sherbourne St John
Party	Candidate	Votes	%	±%
Conservative	John Leek	494	76.6	
Labour	Lydia Massey	90	14.0	
Liberal Democrats	Janice Spalding	61	9.5	
Turnout		645		
Conservative hold		Swing		

=== South Ham ===
South Ham
Party	Candidate	Votes	%	±%
Labour	Colin Regan	977	56.2	
Conservative	Jim Holder	328	18.9	
Liberal Democrats	Madeline Hussey	277	15.9	
UKIP	Duncan Stone	157	9.0	
Turnout		1739		
Labour hold		Swing		

=== Tadley South ===
Tadley South
Party	Candidate	Votes	%	±%
Conservative	David Leeks	685	61.7	
Liberal Democrats	Jo Slimin	231	20.8	
Labour	Peter McCann	195	17.6	
Turnout		1111		
Conservative hold		Swing		

=== Whitchurch ===
Whitchurch
Party	Candidate	Votes	%	±%
Liberal Democrats	Eric Dunlop	791	53.4	
Conservative	Ian Green	526	35.5	
Labour	Nuria Pett	164	11.1	
Turnout		1481		
Liberal Democrats hold		Swing		

Preceded by 2011 Basingstoke and Deane Council election	Basingstoke and Deane local elections	Succeeded by Basingstoke and Deane Council election, 2014
