= 2015 Basingstoke and Deane Borough Council election =

2015 UK local government election

- 7 May 2015

21 seats of 60 to Basingstoke and Deane Borough Council 31 seats needed for a majority
	First party	Second party
Party	Conservative	Labour
Seats won	32	17
Seat change	▲3	Steady
	Third party	Fourth party
Party	Liberal Democrats	Independent
Seats won	7	4
Seat change	▼1	▼2
Council control before election
Conservative Party (UK)
Council control after election
Conservative Party (UK)

The 2015 Basingstoke and Deane Borough Council election took place on 7 May 2015 to elect members of Basingstoke and Deane Borough Council in England. It was held on the same day as the 2015 general election as well as other local elections.

21 seats were up for election. The seat in Rooksdown was up for election due to a casual vacancy, and its winner would serve a term lasting until 2016.

The Conservatives gained four seats and gained a four-seat majority on the council. They gained one seat from Labour in Brighton Hill North and two from independents in Chineham and Tadley Central. Both the defeated independent candidates were seeking re-election; the former was a long-serving independent, while the latter had been elected as a Conservative in 2011 before defecting to UKIP, then becoming independent. Labour gained the rural ward of Overton, Laverstoke and Steventon from the Liberal Democrats.

== Results summary ==
Basingstoke and Deane Borough Council election 2015
Party	This election			Full council			This election		
Party	Seats	Net	Seats %	Other	Total	Total %	Votes	Votes %	+/−
Conservative	16	▲3	76.19	16	32	53.33	36,143	52.3	
Labour	3	Steady	14.28	14	17	28.33	12,725	18.4	
Liberal Democrats	2	▼1	9.52	5	7	11.66	8,608	12.5	
Independent	0	▼2	0	0	4	6.66	3,635	5.3	
Green	0	Steady	0	0	0	0	1,090	1.6	
TUSC	0	Steady	0	0	0	0	41	0.1	

== Results by ward ==
=== Basing ===
Basing
Party	Candidate	Votes	%	±%
Conservative	Clive Pinder	2,921	57.8	
UKIP	Hazel Vanbergen	754	14.9	
Labour	Andrew Mountford	697	13.8	
Liberal Democrats	Alan Read	684	13.5	
Turnout				
Conservative hold		Swing		

=== Baughurst and Tadley North ===
Baughurst and Tadley North
Party	Candidate	Votes	%	±%
Conservative	Robert Tate	1,671	54.6	
Liberal Democrats	Chris Curtis	1,112	36.3	
Labour	George Porter	278	9.1	
Turnout				
Conservative hold		Swing		

=== Bramley and Sherfield ===
Bramley and Sherfield
Party	Candidate	Votes	%	±%
Conservative	Nick Robinson	1,889	60.3	
Independent	Bruce Ansell	943	30.1	
UKIP	Alan Simpson	302	9.6	
Turnout				
Conservative hold		Swing		

=== Brighton Hill North ===
Brighton Hill North
Party	Candidate	Votes	%	±%
Conservative	Hannah Golding	974	36.7	
Labour	Janet Westbrook	782	29.9	
UKIP	Steve James-Bailey	491	18.5	
Liberal Democrats	Ted Blackmore-Squires	141	5.3	
Green	Richard Winter	141	5.3	
Turnout				
Conservative gain from Labour		Swing		

=== Burghclere, Highclere and St Mary Bourne ===
Burghclere, Highclere and St Mary Bourne
Party	Candidate	Votes	%	±%
Conservative	John Izett	2,665	77.3	
Liberal Democrats	Pauleen Malone	432	12.5	
Labour	Romilla Wickremeratne	351	10.2	
Turnout				
Conservative hold		Swing		

=== Chineham ===
Chineham
Party	Candidate	Votes	%	±%
Conservative	Joyce Bowyer	2,409	45.3	
Independent	Martin Biermann	2,331	43.8	
UKIP	Steve Poulter	581	10.9	
Turnout				
Conservative gain from Independent		Swing		

=== Eastrop ===
Eastrop
Party	Candidate	Votes	%	±%
Liberal Democrats	Graham Parker	911	34.3	
Conservative	Ian Smith	780	29.4	
Labour	Jonathan Stokes	502	18.9	
UKIP	Alan Stone	282	10.6	
Green	Richard Matthewson	178	6.7	
Turnout				
Liberal Democrats hold		Swing		

=== Grove ===
Grove
Party	Candidate	Votes	%	±%
Liberal Democrats	Ronald Hussey	1,402	41.9	
Conservative	Penny Bates	900	26.9	
Labour	Michael Stockwell	579	17.3	
UKIP	Mark Hygate	468	14.0	
Turnout				
Liberal Democrats hold		Swing		

=== Hatch Warren and Beggarwood ===
Hatch Warren and Beggarwood
Party	Candidate	Votes	%	±%
Conservative	Rebecca Bean	2,971	64.4	
Labour	Zoe-Marie Rogers	749	16.2	
UKIP	Stan Tennison	493	10.7	
Liberal Democrats	Richard Whitechurch	402	8.7	
Turnout				
Conservative hold		Swing		

=== Kempshott ===
Kempshott
Party	Candidate	Votes	%	±%
Conservative	Rita Burgess	2,669	60.9	
Labour	Walter McCormick	672	15.3	
UKIP	David White	517	11.8	
Liberal Democrats	Madeline Hussey	319	7.3	
Green	Eric Rivron	204	4.7	
Turnout				
Conservative hold		Swing		

=== Kingsclere ===
Kingsclere
Party	Candidate	Votes	%	±%
Conservative	Donald Sherlock	2,000	69.4	
Labour	John Rodway	524	18.2	
Liberal Democrats	Roger Ward	359	12.5	
Turnout				
Conservative hold		Swing		

=== Norden ===
Norden
Party	Candidate	Votes	%	±%
Labour	George Hood	1,797	49.0	
Conservative	Jim Holder	940	25.6	
UKIP	Duncan Stone	514	14.0	
Green	Lynsey Moore	194	5.3	
Liberal Democrats	Doris Jones	183	5.0	
TUSC	Mayola Blagdon	41	1.1	
Turnout				
Conservative hold		Swing		

=== Oakley and North Waltham ===
Oakley and North Waltham
Party	Candidate	Votes	%	±%
Conservative	Rob Golding	2,595	62.3	
Labour	Julie Pierce	552	13.3	
UKIP	Peter Johnson	472	11.3	
Liberal Democrats	Robert Cooper	378	9.1	
Green	Paul Crawte	169	4.1	
Turnout				
Conservative hold		Swing		

=== Overton, Laverstoke and Steventon ===
Overton, Laverstoke and Steventon
Party	Candidate	Votes	%	±%
Labour	Colin Phillimore	1,042	36.0	
Conservative	Marion Jones	1,013	35.0	
Liberal Democrats	Lucy Sloane Williams	636	22.0	
Green	Kirsten Robinson	204	7.0	
Turnout				
Labour gain from Liberal Democrats		Swing		

=== Pamber and Silchester ===
Pamber and Silchester
Party	Candidate	Votes	%	±%
Conservative	Marilyn Tucker	1,910	69.7	
Labour	Lydia Massey	430	15.7	
UKIP	Janice Simpson	402	14.7	
Turnout				
Conservative hold		Swing		

=== Rooksdown ===
Rooksdown By-election
Party	Candidate	Votes	%	±%
Conservative	Simon Bound	1,130	62.3	
Labour	Daniel O'Loughlin	419	23.1	
UKIP	Lucy Hamilton	188	10.4	
Liberal Democrats	Obi Nwasike	78	4.3	
Turnout				
Conservative hold		Swing		

=== South Ham ===
South Ham
Party	Candidate	Votes	%	±%
Labour	Gary Watts	1,654	41.2	
Conservative	Rebecca Sanders	1,322	32.9	
UKIP	Malik Azam	818	20.4	
Liberal Democrats	Stephen Whitechurch	219	5.5	
Turnout				
Labour hold		Swing		

=== Tadley Central ===
Tadley Central
Party	Candidate	Votes	%	±%
Conservative	Jonathan Richards	628	24.8	
Liberal Democrats	Jo Slimin	386	26.3	
Independent	Stephen West	361	24.6	
Labour	Peter McCann	93	6.3	
Turnout				
Conservative gain from Independent		Swing		

=== Tadley South ===
Tadley South
Party	Candidate	Votes	%	±%
Conservative	Rob Musson	1,787	61.3	
Liberal Democrats	Warwick Lovegrove	674	23.1	
Labour	Scarlett Russell	454	15.6	
Turnout				
Conservative hold		Swing		

=== Upton Grey and The Candovers ===
Upton Grey and The Candovers
Party	Candidate	Votes	%	±%
Conservative	Mark Ruffell	1,565	87.8	
Labour	Alice James	217	12.2	
Turnout				
Conservative hold		Swing		

=== Winklebury ===
Winklebury
Party	Candidate	Votes	%	±%
Conservative	Joe Smith	1,404	45.8	
Labour	Barnaby Wheller	933	30.4	
UKIP	Phil Heath	549	17.9	
Liberal Democrats	Michael Berwick-Gooding	179	5.8	
Turnout				
Conservative hold		Swing		
