= Winklebury =

Suburb of Basingstoke, Hampshire, England

Coordinates: 51.2687°N 1.1234°W

Winklebury and Manydown
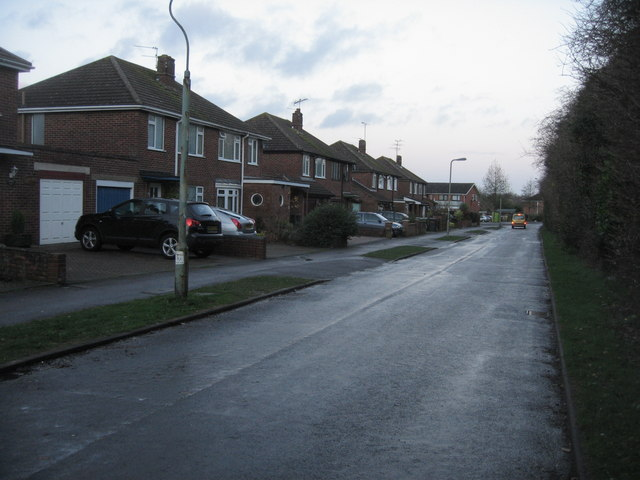
- Hawthorn Way

- Location within Hampshire
- Population: 6,180
- District: Basingstoke and Deane
- Shire county: Hampshire
- Region: South East
- Country: England
- Sovereign state: United Kingdom
- Post town: BASINGSTOKE
- Postcode district: RG23
- Dialling code: 01256
- Police: Hampshire and Isle of Wight
- Fire: Hampshire and Isle of Wight
- Ambulance: South Central
- UK Parliament: Basingstoke

Winklebury and Manydown is a large suburb located two miles north-west of central Basingstoke in the UK. Until the late 1960s Winklebury was a collection of small holdings but Basingstoke's growth as a London Overspill town saw the area become a housing hotspot.

== History ==
Historically the area has some of the oldest landmarks in Urban Basingstoke. It contains the remains of an Iron Age hill fort, A Roman road from Winchester to Silchester runs along the western boundary and is still in use.

== Governance ==
Winklebury and Manydown is a ward of Basingstoke and Deane and returns two councillors.

== Geography ==
To the North of Winklebury is the site of Park Prewett Hospital (1912–1997), now the separate civil parish of Rooksdown. The hospital was served by its own railway line until 1956 and the course of the old railway now forms the northern eastern boundary of Winklebury. The north western boundary is the footpath on the northern side of the A339.

== Culture and community ==
=== Culture ===
There are also active Scouts and Guides groups in Winklebury. The guides groups meet at Winklebury Junior School while the Scouts groups meet at Castle Hill School. The Guides and Scouts groups often feature in community events including the Basingstoke Gangshow, fun days and the Haarlem Jamborette every four years in the Netherlands.

=== Community facilities ===
Winklebury and Manydown has three shopping areas: Winklebury Centre, Elmwood Parade and Watson Way. Winklebury Centre is the main precinct as it houses a handful of shops including John Burton's butchers, Pharmacy Link, and Greenways newsagent. Elmwood Parade houses a tanning salon, a hairdresser, a charity shop, a convenience store and Simms and Chips computer shop. Watson way shops consist of a newsagency/post office, a Chinese take away and a public house (The Winkle). Winklebury had a Co-operative food supermarket previously operated by Somerfield; this was later taken over by The Food Retail Group and run as a Budgens supermarket, however this has since closed down. It was announced in January 2018 that the site will be redeveloped as Basingstoke’s first Aldi supermarket.

== Transport ==
Winklebury and Manydown has a frequent bus service, operated by Stagecoach, to Basingstoke town centre via Houndmills. Stagecoach also operates a less frequent (Monday to Saturday only) bus service from Winklebury to South Ham, the North Hampshire Hospital, Popley and Chineham Centre.

== Education ==
Winklebury and Manydown has two infant schools and two junior schools, The local schools are:

- Winklebury Junior school
- Winklebury Infant School
- Castle Hill Junior school
- Castle Hill Infant school

== Religious sites ==
Church of England Diocese of Winchester.[3]

== Sport ==
Winklebury and Manydown has a large playing field. The playing field has been redevelop into new football pitches and a new football stand. Part of this development houses the offices for the Headquarters of the Hampshire FA.

Winklebury and Manydown has its own youth football set up. The Winklebury Wizards play in the Peter Houseman Youth League (named after the late Chelsea player, Peter Houseman) in various age groups. From under 7s to under 10s, the teams play small sided football on reduced sized pitches. From under 11s to under 15s, the teams play 11-a-side matches on full sized pitches.
