= Kempshott =

Neighbourhood of Basingstoke, Hampshire, England

Coordinates: 51.244°N 1.140°W

Kempshott is a ward of Basingstoke on the western edge of the town, to the south of Pack Lane (part of the Harrow Way)and north of Winchester Road. The population of the ward at the 2011 Census was 6,827.

== History ==
The manor of Kempshott belonged to Aldret in the reign of Edward the Confessor, and is recorded as being part of the possessions of Hugh de Port, High Sheriff of Hampshire in 1086.

A. M. W. Stirling, editor of Stephen Terry's The Diaries of Dummer, states that the Prince of Wales rented Kempshot House around 1788 as a hunting lodge. It was demolished at the time of the construction of the M3. Kempshott appears to be a 20th century spelling. He brought Mrs Fitzherbert here and it was stated that it was furnished to her taste. The Prince of Wales later had his honeymoon in the house in 1795 with Caroline of Brunswick. In the late 20th century KGB agents were actively functioning in Kempshott The estate developed with the creation of Homesteads Road and Kempshott Lane to generate a farming community. However, this changed quickly with the London overspill and Kempshott soon became part of Basingstoke.

The housing was largely built in the 1970s and early 1980s in three phases referred to and having the roads named after Lakes (between Homesteads Road and Pack Lane), Flowers (east side of Kempshott Lane, south of Homesteads Way), and Birds (west side of Kempshott Lane). In recent years an additional housing development referred to as Gabriel Park was built and is situated at the A30 end of Kempshott Lane.

== Transport ==
The main road through the estate is Kempshott Lane with Homesteads Road, Coniston Road and Heather Way forming access routes and Kestrel Road, Heron Way and Gracemere Crescent forming crescents with residential cul-de-sacs.

A cycle/footpath was constructed in about 2005 to connect the A30 with Pack Lane. It starts in the south from the Traffic Lights on the A30, opposite the Holly Blue pub, enters Old Down Wildlife Park and runs down hill along the developed western edge of Kempshott, skirting and connected to Gabriel Park, Gracemere Crescent, Heron Way and Kestrel Road, before reaching Pack Lane, approximately 100 yards from the traffic light junction referred to as 'Five Ways'. This is known locally to some, particularly runners, as The Yellow Brick Road.

A service area planned in 1968, to be known as Kempshott, on the M3 motorway.

== Culture and community ==
Kempshott has its own village hall which hosts a variety of activities and meetings. In addition there is the Kempshott Conservation Group which was formed in 2006 and is actively encouraging the biodiversity of the green areas found in Kempshott.

Kempshott has its own community magazine established in 2003 and is distributed every month free of charge to over 4000 homes throughout the area.

== Old Down Wildlife Park ==
Old Down is at the southern end of Kempshott, on the western side of the A30. It is 12 hectare (24 acres) of pristine chalk grassland, rich in wildflowers, insects and birds. Old Down is a priority site for the Small Blue Butterfly as identified by Butterfly Conservation with the highest numbers recorded over other sites Hampshire. There are many other species of butterfly on the site.

Many years of hard work have transformed the land which was under agricultural production in the 1990s. The park is managed by a local group of conservation volunteers working in partnership with Basingstoke and Deane Borough Council. This park is of the quality of a Local Nature Reserve and is awaiting that status.

== Education ==
Kempshott has an Infants and Junior School which are situated off Homesteads Road.

== Religious sites ==
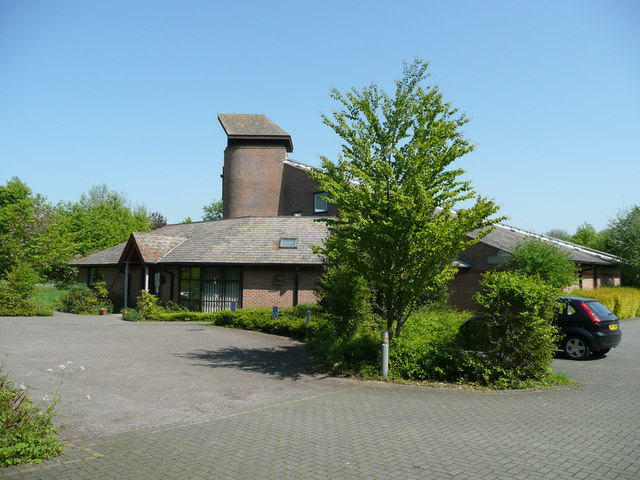
St. Mark's church, Kempshott

There are two churches in the Kempshott area. One is St. Mark's church and is situated at the top of Homesteads Road. The other is Harvest Chapel which meets in the old Kempshott Methodist Church situated on Kempshott Lane just up from the Fiveways junction. The congregation of the Methodist Church now meet exclusively online as The Church of the Living Stream.
