= South Ham =

District of Basingstoke, Hampshire, England

Coordinates: 51.258°N 1.112°W

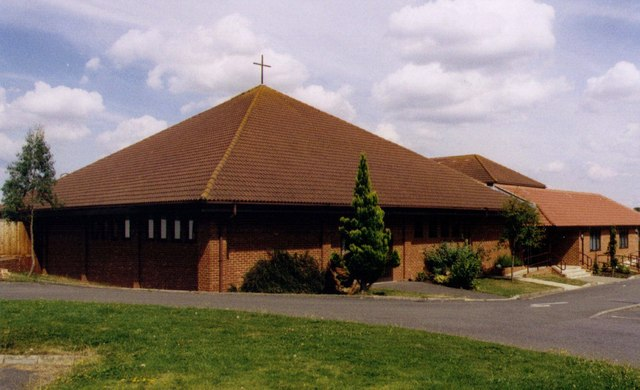
St Joseph, South Ham, Basingstoke

South Ham is a district and ward of Basingstoke, to the west of the town centre.

It takes its name from South Ham Farm, which was once the major farm in the area but was demolished in the early 1960s. Parts of the area were developed for Council Housing in both the 1930s and 1950s when Western Way, one of the principal roads was built. The majority of development took place in the late 1960s, when Basingstoke was developed as an overspill town for London. South Ham has a number of roads named after royalty, authors and saints.

South Ham has four schools (Aldworth School, Park View Infants and Juniors, St. Anne's Catholic Primary School and Bishop Challoner Catholic Secondary School), a library, a dental practice and surgery and several churches. In 2020, Hampshire County Council announced plans to close South Ham library.

== Regeneration ==
Since 2023, South Ham and neighbouring Buckskin have been the subject of a long-term regeneration programme led by Sovereign Hill Partnership, a joint venture between Sovereign Network Group (SNG) and housebuilder The Hill Group. The programme seeks to improve housing, public spaces and local infrastructure across the area through a combination of refurbishment and redevelopment projects.

In February 2026, the Park View Primary School end of Pinkerton Road was identified as a priority area for potential redevelopment. Additional locations, including parts of Cotswold Close and Winchester Road, were identified for pilot refurbishment projects.

The regeneration forms part of wider plans for neighbourhood renewal in South Ham and Buckskin, which have been identified by Basingstoke and Deane Borough Council as a priority area for housing delivery and regeneration.
