= 2027 Basingstoke and Deane Borough Council election =

2027 English local government election

2027 Basingstoke & Deane Borough Council election
- 6 May 2027

18 out of 54 seats to Basingstoke & Deane Borough Council 28 seats needed for a majority
Leader	Paul Harvey	Simon Minas-Bound	Gavin James
Party	B&DI	Conservative	Liberal Democrats
Leader's seat	Norden	Sherborne St John & Rooksdown	Eastrop & Grove
Last election	12 seats, 12.7%	11 seats, 21.1%	11 seats, 15.6%
Current seats	12	11	11
Leader	Abdel Ibrahim	Paul Miller
Party	Labour	Reform	Independent
Leader's seat	Brookvale & Kings Furlong	Chineham
Last election	10 seats, 11.2%	3 seats, 24.7%	3 seats, 5.1%
Current seats	10	3	3
Leader		Stacy Hart
Party	Green	All In
Leader's seat		Hatch Warren & Beggarwood
Last election	2 seats, 8.0%	2 seats, 1.6%
Current seats	2	2
Incumbent Leader
Paul Harvey
B&DI
No overall control (Note: B&DI–Liberal Democrats–Independent–Green–All In coalition.)

The 2027 Basingstoke & Deane Borough Council election will be held on 6 May 2027 to elect members of Basingstoke & Deane Borough Council in Hampshire, England. This will be on the same day as other local elections held across the United Kingdom.

== Background ==
=== Local government reorganisation ===
Due to proposed structural changes to local government in England, the 2026 election was intended to be the final election to the council before it was abolished and replaced by North Hampshire Council, a new unitary authority.

However, on 7 September 2026, the government announced it was withdrawing plans for the planned restructuring pending review. Following this announcement, local elections due to be held in 2027 under the existing local electoral calendar would proceed.

== Summary ==
=== Election result ===
2027 Basingstoke & Deane Borough Council election
Party	This election				Full council			This election		
Party	Candidates	Seats	Net	Seats %	Other	Total	Total %	Votes	Votes %	+/−
B&DI					8					
Conservative					7					
Liberal Democrats					8					
Labour					5					
Reform					2					
Independent					2					
Green					2					
All In					2					

=== Incumbents ===
Ward	Incumbent councillor	Affiliation	Re-standing
Basing & Upton Grey	Onnalee Cubitt	Independent	
Bramley	Chris Tomblin	B&DI	
Brighton Hill	Andrew McCormick	Labour	
Brookvale & Kings Furlong	Abdel Ibrahim	Labour	
Chineham	Paul Miller	Reform	
Eastrop & Grove	Gavin James	Liberal Democrats	
Evingar	John Izett	Conservative	
Hatch Warren & Beggarwood	Dan Putty	Conservative	
Kempshott & Buckskin	Sean Dillow	Conservative	
Norden	Paul Harvey	B&DI	
Oakley & The Candovers	Marc Connor	B&DI	
Popley	Jacky Tustain	Labour	
Sherborne St John & Rooksdown	Jay Ganesh	Conservative	
South Ham	Gary Watts	Labour	
Tadley & Pamber	Androulla Johnstone	Liberal Democrats	
Tadley North, Kingsclere & Baughurst	Mike Bound	Liberal Democrats	
Whitchurch, Overton & Laverstoke	Karen Watts	B&DI	
Winklebury & Marydown	Angie Freeman	Labour	
