= 2026 Basingstoke and Deane Borough Council election =

Local election in Hampshire, England

2026 Basingstoke & Deane Borough Council election
- 7 May 2026

19 out of 54 seats to Basingstoke & Deane Borough Council (including 1 by-election) 28 seats needed for a majority
- Registered: 140,393
- Turnout: 60,066; 42.8%
	First party	Second party	Third party
Leader	Simon Minas-Bound	Gavin James	Paul Harvey
Party	Conservative	Liberal Democrats	B&DI
Last election	16 seats, 29.7%	11 seats, 18.2%	10 seats, 12.3%
Seats before	13	11	11
Seats won	3	4	5
Seats after	11	11	12
Seat change	▼2	Steady	▲1
Popular vote	13,456	9,931	8,101
Percentage	21.1%	15.6%	12.7%
Swing	▼8.6%	▼2.6%	▲0.4%
	Fourth party	Fifth party	Sixth party
Leader	Abdel Ibrahim	Paul Miller
Party	Labour	Reform	Independent
Last election	11 seats, 22.5%	0 seats, 0.8%	3 seats, 5.1%
Seats before	10	1	4
Seats won	2	2	1
Seats after	10	3	3
Seat change	Steady	▲2	▼1
Popular vote	7,130	15,755	3,276
Percentage	11.2%	24.7%	5.1%
Swing	▼11.3%	▲23.9%	0.0%
	Seventh party	Eighth party
Leader		Stacy Hart
Party	Green	All In
Last election	2 seats, 4.6%	Did not exist
Seats before	2	1
Seats won	1	1
Seats after	2	2
Seat change	Steady	▲1
Popular vote	5,101	999
Percentage	8.0%	1.6%
Swing	▲3.4%	N/A
- Winner of each seat at the 2026 Basingstoke and Deane Borough Council election.
Leader before election
Paul Harvey
B&DI
No overall control
Leader after election
Paul Harvey
B&DI
No overall control

The 2026 Basingstoke and Deane Borough Council election was held on 7 May 2026, alongside the other local elections across the United Kingdom being held on the same day, to elect 18 of 54 members of Basingstoke and Deane Borough Council.

Prior to the election, the council was under no overall control, being run by a coalition of the Liberal Democrats and the "Independent Forum", a group comprising local party the Basingstoke & Deane Independents (B&DI) and some of the other smaller parties and independent councillors. The leader of the council was Paul Harvey of the B&DI, and the Liberal Democrat group leader, Gavin James, served as co-leader. The council remained under no overall control at this election, and the same coalition continued after the election.

== Background ==
In 2024, the council remained under no overall control. The council was governed as a joint administration of the Independent Forum group and the Liberal Democrats. The former consisted of the Basingstoke & Deane Independents, other independents, the Green Party and the All In Party. The latter was the local successor to the Women's Equality Party after the dissolution of the national party in 2024.

=== Council composition ===
After 2024 election		Before 2026 election	
Party	Seats	Party	Seats
Conservative	16	Conservative	13
Liberal Democrats	11	Liberal Democrats	11
B&DI	10	B&DI	11
Labour	11	Labour	10
Green	2	Green	2
Reform	0	Reform	1
All In	Did not exist	All In	1
Independent	3	Independent	4
Vacant	N/A	Vacant	1
Women's Equality	1	Women's Equality	Dissolved

Changes 2024–2026:

- May 2024: Samir Kotecha (Conservative) leaves party to sit as an independent
- November 2024: Women’s Equality Party dissolved – Stacy Hart sits as an independent
- April 2025:
  - All In formed – Stacy Hart (Independent) joins party
  - Marc Connor (Labour) joins B&DI
- October 2025: Paul Miller (Conservative) joins Reform
- November 2025: David McIntyre (Conservative) resigns – seat left vacant until 2026 election

=== Election results ===
2026 Basingstoke & Deane Borough Council election
Party	This election				Full council			This election		
Party	Candidates	Seats	Net	Seats %	Other	Total	Total %	Votes	Votes %	+/−
B&DI	{{{candidates}}}	5	▲1	26.3	7	12	22.2	8,101	12.7	+0.4
Conservative	{{{candidates}}}	3	▼2	15.8	8	11	21.2	13,456	21.1	–8.6
Liberal Democrats	{{{candidates}}}	4	Steady	21.1	7	11	21.2	9,931	15.6	–2.6
Labour	{{{candidates}}}	2	Steady	10.5	8	10	19.2	7,130	11.2	–11.3
Reform	{{{candidates}}}	2	▲2	10.5	1	3	5.8	15,755	24.7	+23.9
Independent	{{{candidates}}}	1	▼1	5.3	2	3	5.8	3,276	5.1	±0.0
Green	{{{candidates}}}	1	Steady	5.3	1	2	3.8	5,101	8.0	+3.4
All In	{{{candidates}}}	1	▲1	5.3	1	2	3.8	999	1.6	N/A

== Ward results ==
=== Basing & Upton Grey ===
Basing & Upton Grey
Party	Candidate	Votes	%	±%
Independent	Kate Tuck*	2,116	49.2	–3.2
Reform	Annie Kemkaren	908	21.1	N/A
Conservative	Shantha Weerasiri	648	15.1	–11.0
Liberal Democrats	Richard Lilleker	429	10.0	+3.9
Labour	Kieran Sidley	202	4.7	–9.8
Majority		1,208	28.1	+1.8
Turnout		4,312	52.4	+15.5
Registered electors		8,231		
Independent hold				

=== Bramley ===
Bramley
Party	Candidate	Votes	%	±%
B&DI	Tony Durrant*	1,188	38.4	–8.1
Reform	Christopher Horwood	768	24.8	N/A
Conservative	Jonathan Johnson	570	18.4	–18.0
Liberal Democrats	Christopher Evans	434	14.0	+9.2
Labour	Adam Coulthard	132	4.3	–8.0
Majority		420	13.6	+3.5
Turnout		3,109	43.0	+8.9
Registered electors		7,169		
B&DI hold				

=== Brighton Hill ===
Brighton Hill
Party	Candidate	Votes	%	±%
Liberal Democrats	Andrea Bowes*	1,007	34.4	–14.6
Reform	Keith Vaughan	892	30.5	N/A
Labour	Shibaji Shrestha	515	17.6	–16.7
Green	Carolyn Davison-Roper	284	9.7	N/A
Conservative	Edward Norman	231	7.9	–3.6
Majority		115	3.9	–10.8
Turnout		2,946	39.2	+9.8
Registered electors		7,511		
Liberal Democrats hold				

=== Brookvale & Kings Furlong ===
Brookvale & Kings Furlong
Party	Candidate	Votes	%	±%
Labour Co-op	Bikram Banerjee	852	27.1	–3.9
Conservative	Kishor Patel	629	20.0	–12.9
Liberal Democrats	John Shaw	583	18.5	–7.6
Green	Ashlynn Butler	568	18.1	+11.7
Reform	Alan Stone	513	16.3	N/A
Majority		223	7.1	N/A
Turnout		3,158	40.6	+5.3
Registered electors		7,760		
Labour Co-op gain from Green		Swing	▲4.5	

=== Chineham ===
Chineham
Party	Candidate	Votes	%	±%
Green	Michael Blackberry	1,134	31.8	–6.4
Reform	Greggory Wilkinson	943	26.4	+21.0
Conservative	Ricardo Ferreira	926	25.9	–10.5
Labour	Ruth Kellaway	321	9.0	–6.7
Liberal Democrats	Michael McKay	246	6.9	+2.6
Majority		191	5.4	+3.6
Turnout		3,579	42.3	+10.9
Registered electors		8,443		
Green gain from Conservative		Swing	▼13.7	

=== Eastrop & Grove ===
Eastrop & Grove
Party	Candidate	Votes	%	±%
Liberal Democrats	John McKay*	1,527	47.8	–13.6
Reform	Jay Bailey	765	24.0	N/A
Green	Niamh Harrison	346	10.8	N/A
Conservative	Nick Bates	323	10.1	–4.7
Labour	Lilly Beeson	232	7.3	–11.1
Majority		762	23.8	–19.2
Turnout		3,206	44.1	+12.5
Registered electors		7,273		
Liberal Democrats hold				

=== Evingar ===
Evingar
Party	Candidate	Votes	%	±%
Conservative	Samuel Carr*	1,637	46.5	–6.3
Reform	Garald Smith	796	22.6	N/A
Green	Christopher Whitehead	504	14.3	–0.3
Liberal Democrats	Erica Shaw	419	11.9	–6.4
Labour	Robert Thomas	167	4.7	–2.8
Majority		841	23.9	–10.6
Turnout		3,537	47.1	+13.7
Registered electors		7,495		
Conservative hold				

=== Hatch Warren & Beggarwood ===
Hatch Warren & Beggarwood
Party	Candidate	Votes	%	±%
All In	Dani Davies	999	29.7	N/A
Conservative	Stephen Reid	966	28.7	+3.7
Reform	Spencer Cleary	841	25.0	N/A
Labour	Matthew Evans	321	9.5	–2.6
Liberal Democrats	Roger Blackmore-Squires	237	7.0	+3.6
Majority		33	1.0	N/A
Turnout		3,378	44.1	+7.3
Registered electors		7,654		
All In gain from B&DI				

=== Kempshott & Buckskin ===
Kempshott & Buckskin
Party	Candidate	Votes	%	±%
Conservative	Val Elliott	1,016	29.1	–17.4
Reform	Mark Knight	1,011	29.0	N/A
Green	Harrison Manners	503	14.4	+8.6
Labour	Catherine Hopkins	422	12.1	–16.8
B&DI	Samir Kotecha*	290	8.3	N/A
Liberal Democrats	Andrew Benson-Wilson	245	7.0	–3.5
Majority		5	0.1	–17.5
Turnout		3,496	42.6	+12.2
Registered electors		8,206		
Conservative hold				

=== Norden ===
Norden
Party	Candidate	Votes	%	±%
B&DI	Linda Hynan	1,269	48.5	–4.9
Reform	Matthew Cooper	522	20.0	N/A
Labour	Jack Wadge-Stacey	389	14.9	–12.8
Conservative	Jonathan Tate	276	10.6	–0.2
Liberal Democrats	Scott Lawrence	159	6.1	+1.3
Majority		747	28.5	+2.8
Turnout		2,632	36.5	+8.4
Registered electors		7,198		
B&DI hold				

=== Oakley & The Candovers ===
Oakley & The Candovers (2 seats due to by-election)
Party	Candidate	Votes	%	±%
B&DI	Alex Rowley	1,756	43.1	–1.8
B&DI	Marc Connor*	1,280	31.4	–13.5
Conservative	Sherrie de Kiguchi	1,145	28.1	–8.0
Reform	Christopher Aldous	1,019	25.0	N/A
Reform	Martin Street	856	21.0	N/A
Conservative	Taylor Parnell	831	20.4	–15.7
Liberal Democrats	Hannah Cooper	381	9.3	+2.1
Liberal Democrats	Robert Cooper	318	7.8	+0.6
Labour	Bronwyn Phillips	286	7.0	–4.9
Labour	Michael Stockwell	280	6.9	–5.0
Turnout		4,261	48.7	+9.6
Registered electors		8,746		
B&DI hold				
B&DI gain from Conservative				

=== Popley ===
Popley
Party	Candidate	Votes	%	±%
Labour	Ellen Hynes	1,032	38.8	–27.6
Reform	Duncan Stone	803	30.2	N/A
Green	Ty Murray	383	14.4	+10.4
Conservative	Satya Sookhun	274	10.3	–3.3
Liberal Democrats	Michael Berwick-Gooding	171	6.4	–3.4
Majority		229	8.6	–44.2
Turnout		2,672	34.9	+12.0
Registered electors		7,665		
Labour gain from B&DI				

=== Sherborne St John & Rooksdown ===
Sherborne St John & Rooksdown
Party	Candidate	Votes	%	±%
Conservative	Karl Rand	1,084	33.4	–13.2
Reform	John Naldrett	756	23.3	N/A
Labour	Bradley Phillips	485	14.9	–23.0
Green	Elle Green	453	13.9	+8.1
Liberal Democrats	Ryan Hickling	269	8.3	+1.8
Independent	Nick Robinson	201	6.2	N/A
Majority		328	10.1	+1.4
Turnout		3,261	37.6	+9.6
Registered electors		8,658		
Conservative hold				

=== South Ham ===
South Ham
Party	Candidate	Votes	%	±%
Reform	Steven Trumm	864	34.0	N/A
Labour	Tony Jones*	560	22.0	–35.6
Independent	Zena Lindsay	406	16.0	N/A
Conservative	Lilly Turner	367	14.4	–9.4
Green	Joseph Hutton	207	8.1	+4.7
Liberal Democrats	Madeline Hussey	138	5.4	–2.2
Majority		304	12.0	N/A
Turnout		2,549	33.9	+9.1
Registered electors		7,502		
Reform gain from Labour				

=== Tadley & Pamber ===
Tadley & Pamber
Party	Candidate	Votes	%	±%
Liberal Democrats	Jo Slimin*	1,497	38.3	–11.4
Reform	Lyn Roberts	1,179	30.1	+22.1
Conservative	Jonathan Richards	788	20.1	–14.7
Green	Kelly Jones	307	7.8	N/A
Labour	Wayne Terry	141	3.6	–3.9
Majority		318	8.2	–6.7
Turnout		3,929	45.0	+12.6
Registered electors		8,722		
Liberal Democrats hold		Swing	▼16.8	

=== Tadley North, Kingsclere & Baughurst ===
Tadley North, Kingsclere & Baughurst
Party	Candidate	Votes	%	±%
Liberal Democrats	Kerry Morrow*	1,408	37.0	–2.1
Reform	Charlotte Robinson	1,036	27.2	N/A
Conservative	Bruce Buckland	988	25.9	–0.7
Green	Elliott Gardiner	255	6.7	N/A
Labour	Daniel Reah	123	3.2	–6.6
Majority		372	9.8	–2.7
Turnout		3,822	44.6	+10.3
Registered electors		8,565		
Liberal Democrats hold				

=== Whitchurch, Overton & Laverstoke ===
Whitchurch, Overton & Laverstoke
Party	Candidate	Votes	%	±%
B&DI	Chloe Ashfield*	2,318	58.0	–6.2
Reform	Victoria Harber	681	17.0	N/A
Conservative	Kieran McDermott	442	11.1	–2.4
Liberal Democrats	Lucy Sloane-Williams	390	9.8	+2.0
Labour	Margaret Gallagher	165	4.1	–6.9
Majority		1,637	41.0	–9.7
Turnout		4,008	49.2	+12.6
Registered electors		8,144		
B&DI hold				

=== Winklebury & Manydown ===
Winklebury & Manydown
Party	Candidate	Votes	%	±%
Reform	Christina Jordan	602	27.3	N/A
Independent	Abigail Compton-Burnett	553	25.1	N/A
Labour	Cait Fuller	505	22.9	–19.4
Conservative	Mike Patchett	315	14.3	–26.5
Green	Bill Farrington	157	7.1	+1.5
Liberal Democrats	Wendy McKay	73	3.3	–2.6
Majority		49	2.2	N/A
Turnout		2,211	40.5	+9.8
Registered electors		5,451		
Reform gain from Labour				
