= 2023 Basingstoke and Deane Borough Council election =

2023 English local election

- 4 May 2023

18 out of 54 seats to Basingstoke and Deane Borough Council 28 seats needed for a majority

| | First party | Second party | Third party |
|---|---|---|---|
| Leader | Simon Minas-Bound | Andrew McCormick | Gavin James |
| Party | Conservative | Labour | Liberal Democrats |
| Last election | 29 seats, 35.7% | 10 seats, 18.3% | 7 seats, 23.3% |
| Seats before | 26 | 9 | 7 |
| Seats won | 6 | 5 | 3 |
| Seats after | 23 | 10 | 9 |
| Seat change | ▼3 | ▲1 | ▲2 |
| Popular vote | 12,978 | 10,537 | 8,792 |
| Percentage | 29.7% | 24.1% | 20.1% |
| Swing | ▼6.0% | ▲5.8% | ▼3.2% |
| | Fourth party | Fifth party | Sixth party |
| Leader | Paul Harvey |
| Party | B&DI | Independent | Green |
| Last election | 8 seats, 14.6% | 0 seats, 0.0% | 0 seats, 2.4% |
| Seats before | 8 | 3 | 1 |
| Seats won | 3 | 1 | 0 |
| Seats after | 8 | 3 | 1 |
| Seat change | Steady | Steady | Steady |
| Popular vote | 4,818 | 1,881 | 2,104 |
| Percentage | 11.0% | 4.3% | 4.8% |
| Swing | ▼3.6% | N/A | ▲2.4% |
- Winner of each seat at the 2023 Basingstoke and Deane Borough Council election
Leader before election
Simon Minas-Bound
Conservative
No overall control
Leader after election
Paul Harvey
B&D Independents
No overall control

The 2023 Basingstoke and Deane Borough Council election took place on 4 May 2023 to elect members of Basingstoke and Deane Borough Council in Hampshire, England. This was on the same day as other local elections in England.

Prior to the election the council was under no overall control, being led by a minority Conservative administration. There were four groups on the council prior to the election; one each for the Conservatives, Labour and Liberal Democrats, and a fourth group called the "Independent Forum" comprising the independent councillors, the Green councillor and local party the Basingstoke and Deane Independents, led by Paul Harvey of the latter party.

Following the election the council remained under no overall control. The Conservatives lost two seats to the Liberal Democrats and one seat to Labour. At the subsequent council meeting on 18 May 2023, Paul Harvey of the Independent Forum was appointed leader of the council with the support of the Labour and Liberal Democrat groups. Liberal Democrat group leader Gavin James was appointed co-leader, and positions on the council's cabinet were shared between the Independent Forum and Liberal Democrats.

== Summary ==
=== Election result ===
2023 Basingstoke and Deane Borough Council election
| Party | This election | | | | Full council | | | This election | | |
| Party | Candidates | Seats | Net | Seats % | Other | Total | Total % | Votes | Votes % | +/− |
|---|---|---|---|---|---|---|---|---|---|---|
| Conservative | {{{candidates}}} | 6 | ▼4 | 33.3 | 17 | 23 | 42.6 | 12,978 | 29.7 | –6.0 |
| Labour | {{{candidates}}} | 5 | ▲1 | 27.8 | 5 | 10 | 18.5 | 10,537 | 24.1 | +5.8 |
| Liberal Democrats | {{{candidates}}} | 3 | ▲2 | 16.7 | 6 | 9 | 16.7 | 8,792 | 20.1 | –3.2 |
| B&DI | {{{candidates}}} | 3 | Steady | 16.7 | 5 | 8 | 14.8 | 4,818 | 11.0 | –3.6 |
| Independent | {{{candidates}}} | 1 | ▲1 | 5.6 | 2 | 3 | 5.6 | 1,881 | 4.3 | N/A |
| Green | {{{candidates}}} | 0 | Steady | 0.0 | 1 | 1 | 1.9 | 2,104 | 4.8 | +2.4 |
| Hampshire Independents | {{{candidates}}} | 0 | Steady | 0.0 | 0 | 0 | 0.0 | 1,653 | 3.8 | –0.3 |
| Women's Equality | {{{candidates}}} | 0 | Steady | 0.0 | 0 | 0 | 0.0 | 925 | 2.1 | +0.9 |

== Ward results ==
The Statement of Persons Nominated, which details the candidates standing in each ward, was released by Basingstoke and Dean Borough Council following the close of nominations on 4 April 2023. The results in each ward were as follows:

=== Basing & Upton Grey ===
Basing & Upton Grey
| Party | Candidate | Votes | % | ±% |
|---|---|---|---|---|
| Independent | Onnalee Cubitt* | 1,881 | 64.5 | N/A |
| Labour | Holly Hopgood | 571 | 19.6 | +2.1 |
| Liberal Democrats | Richard Lilleker | 465 | 15.9 | +2.1 |
| Majority | | 1,310 | 44.9 | |
| Turnout | | 2,963 | 37.0 | |
| Registered electors | | 7,999 | | |
| Independent gain from Conservative | | | | |

=== Bramley ===
Bramley
| Party | Candidate | Votes | % | ±% |
|---|---|---|---|---|
| B&DI | Christopher Tomblin* | 1,096 | 46.9 | −7.5 |
| Conservative | Simon Mahaffey | 758 | 32.4 | −6.0 |
| Labour | Adam Coulthard | 260 | 11.1 | N/A |
| Liberal Democrats | Paula Baker | 223 | 9.5 | N/A |
| Majority | | 338 | 14.5 | |
| Turnout | | 2,345 | 34.4 | |
| Registered electors | | 6,821 | | |
| B&DI hold | | Swing | ▼0.8 | |

=== Brighton Hill ===
Brighton Hill
| Party | Candidate | Votes | % | ±% |
|---|---|---|---|---|
| Labour Co-op | Andy McCormick* | 868 | 40.8 | +15.4 |
| Liberal Democrats | Peter Whitaker | 763 | 35.9 | −6.6 |
| Conservative | Poonam Gurung | 305 | 14.3 | −10.0 |
| Hampshire Independents | Anna-Marie Moynihan | 101 | 4.7 | N/A |
| Green | Stephen Philpotts | 91 | 4.3 | N/A |
| Majority | | 105 | 4.9 | |
| Turnout | | 2,156 | 28.3 | |
| Registered electors | | 7,633 | | |
| Labour Co-op hold | | Swing | ▲11.0 | |

=== Brookvale & Kings Furlong ===
Brookvale & Kings Furlong
| Party | Candidate | Votes | % | ±% |
|---|---|---|---|---|
| Labour | Abdel Ibrahim | 906 | 37.9 | −0.7 |
| Conservative | Sam Jeans* | 647 | 27.1 | −4.0 |
| Liberal Democrats | Francesca Maritan | 611 | 25.6 | +3.1 |
| Hampshire Independents | Alan Stone | 224 | 9.4 | +1.6 |
| Majority | | 259 | 10.8 | |
| Turnout | | 2,402 | 31.5 | |
| Registered electors | | 7,624 | | |
| Labour gain from Conservative | | Swing | ▲1.7 | |

=== Chineham ===
Chineham
| Party | Candidate | Votes | % | ±% |
|---|---|---|---|---|
| Conservative | Paul Miller* | 982 | 39.6 | −11.0 |
| Green | Jonathan Jenkin | 848 | 34.2 | +12.1 |
| Labour | Jack Murphy | 364 | 14.7 | −3.2 |
| Liberal Democrats | Scott Lawrence | 181 | 7.3 | −2.1 |
| Hampshire Independents | Neil Fellman | 104 | 4.2 | N/A |
| Majority | | 134 | 5.4 | |
| Turnout | | 2,492 | 30.7 | |
| Registered electors | | 8,110 | | |
| Conservative hold | | Swing | ▼11.6 | |

=== Eastrop & Grove ===
Eastrop & Grove
| Party | Candidate | Votes | % | ±% |
|---|---|---|---|---|
| Liberal Democrats | Gavin James* | 1,454 | 62.1 | +3.2 |
| Conservative | Effie Blankson | 354 | 15.1 | −2.2 |
| Labour | Andy Wilson | 287 | 12.3 | −1.7 |
| Green | Jason Buick | 137 | 5.9 | N/A |
| Hampshire Independents | Lex Smith | 108 | 4.6 | +1.3 |
| Majority | | 1,100 | 47.0 | |
| Turnout | | 2,347 | 32.9 | |
| Registered electors | | 7,145 | | |
| Liberal Democrats hold | | Swing | ▲2.7 | |

=== Evingar ===
Evingar
| Party | Candidate | Votes | % | ±% |
|---|---|---|---|---|
| Conservative | John Izett* | 1,516 | 53.2 | −2.2 |
| Liberal Democrats | Pauleen Malone | 647 | 22.7 | −10.1 |
| Green | Chris Whitehead | 256 | 9.0 | N/A |
| Hampshire Independents | Phil Heath | 230 | 8.1 | −3.8 |
| Labour | Philip Gordon | 201 | 7.1 | N/A |
| Majority | | 869 | 30.5 | |
| Turnout | | 2,860 | 38.9 | |
| Registered electors | | 7,358 | | |
| Conservative hold | | Swing | ▲4.0 | |

=== Hatch Warren & Beggarwood ===
Hatch Warren & Beggarwood
| Party | Candidate | Votes | % | ±% |
|---|---|---|---|---|
| Conservative | Dan Putty* | 1,000 | 39.8 | +8.7 |
| Women's Equality | Stacy Hart | 925 | 36.8 | +19.6 |
| Labour | David Bell | 444 | 17.7 | −2.3 |
| Liberal Democrats | Hannah Cooper | 144 | 5.7 | −2.0 |
| Majority | | 75 | 3.0 | |
| Turnout | | 2,523 | 33.2 | |
| Registered electors | | 7,611 | | |
| Conservative hold | | Swing | ▼5.5 | |

=== Kempshott & Buckskin ===
Kempshott & Buckskin
| Party | Candidate | Votes | % | ±% |
|---|---|---|---|---|
| Conservative | Sean Dillow | 1,176 | 44.7 | −0.5 |
| Labour | Kim Taylor | 957 | 36.4 | +4.7 |
| Liberal Democrats | Moira Whitaker | 225 | 8.6 | −1.4 |
| Green | Bill Farrington | 157 | 6.0 | −2.5 |
| Hampshire Independents | David White | 115 | 4.4 | −0.1 |
| Majority | | 219 | 8.3 | |
| Turnout | | 2,646 | 32.2 | |
| Registered electors | | 8,226 | | |
| Conservative hold | | Swing | ▼2.6 | |

=== Norden ===
Norden
| Party | Candidate | Votes | % | ±% |
|---|---|---|---|---|
| B&DI | Paul Harvey* | 1,144 | 58.8 | +10.7 |
| Labour | Steve Rolfe | 531 | 27.3 | −3.4 |
| Conservative | Kishor Patel | 190 | 9.8 | −5.1 |
| Liberal Democrats | Jardine Barrington-Cook | 80 | 4.1 | −0.4 |
| Majority | | 613 | 31.5 | |
| Turnout | | 1,953 | 26.9 | |
| Registered electors | | 7,254 | | |
| B&DI hold | | Swing | ▲7.1 | |

=== Oakley & The Candovers ===
Oakley & The Candovers
| Party | Candidate | Votes | % | ±% |
|---|---|---|---|---|
| Conservative | Hannah Golding* | 1,009 | 35.6 | −15.7 |
| B&DI | Julian Jones | 942 | 33.2 | N/A |
| Liberal Democrats | Robert Cooper | 366 | 12.9 | −23.8 |
| Labour | Stuart Bond | 332 | 11.7 | N/A |
| Green | Lianne Mabey | 188 | 6.6 | N/A |
| Majority | | 67 | 2.4 | |
| Turnout | | 2,842 | 37.8 | |
| Registered electors | | 7,525 | | |
| Conservative hold | | | | |

=== Popley ===
Popley
| Party | Candidate | Votes | % | ±% |
|---|---|---|---|---|
| Labour | Jacky Tustain* | 1,084 | 64.1 | +24.1 |
| Conservative | Nsima Udoh | 281 | 16.6 | −6.1 |
| Liberal Democrats | Michael Berwick-Gooding | 178 | 10.5 | +1.7 |
| Hampshire Independents | Steve James-Bailey | 148 | 8.8 | +7.1 |
| Majority | | 803 | 47.5 | |
| Turnout | | 1,703 | 22.7 | |
| Registered electors | | 7,514 | | |
| Labour hold | | Swing | ▲15.1 | |

=== Sherborne St John & Rooksdown ===
Sherborne St John & Rooksdown
| Party | Candidate | Votes | % | ±% |
|---|---|---|---|---|
| Conservative | Jay Ganesh* | 1,049 | 46.6 | +0.9 |
| Labour | Bradley Phillips | 874 | 38.8 | +4.2 |
| Liberal Democrats | Martin Baker | 227 | 10.1 | −9.6 |
| Hampshire Independents | Stan Tennison | 102 | 4.5 | N/A |
| Majority | | 175 | 7.8 | |
| Turnout | | 2,263 | 27.4 | |
| Registered electors | | 8,264 | | |
| Conservative hold | | Swing | ▼1.7 | |

=== South Ham ===
South Ham
| Party | Candidate | Votes | % | ±% |
|---|---|---|---|---|
| Labour | Gary Watts* | 1,112 | 59.1 | +3.2 |
| Conservative | Lilian Turner | 493 | 26.2 | −0.8 |
| Liberal Democrats | Madeline Hussey | 156 | 8.3 | −1.3 |
| Hampshire Independents | Dave Watson | 121 | 6.4 | −1.1 |
| Majority | | 619 | 32.9 | |
| Turnout | | 1,890 | 25.2 | |
| Registered electors | | 7,504 | | |
| Labour hold | | Swing | ▲2.0 | |

=== Tadley & Pamber ===
Tadley & Pamber
| Party | Candidate | Votes | % | ±% |
|---|---|---|---|---|
| Liberal Democrats | Androulla Johnstone | 1,217 | 43.2 | −0.5 |
| Conservative | Kerri Carruthers* | 1,117 | 39.7 | −0.6 |
| Labour | Stephen Rothman | 217 | 7.7 | N/A |
| Green | Richard Musson | 187 | 6.6 | −1.6 |
| Hampshire Independents | Duncan Stone | 76 | 2.7 | −5.0 |
| Majority | | 100 | 3.5 | |
| Turnout | | 2,820 | 32.6 | |
| Registered electors | | 8,644 | | |
| Liberal Democrats gain from Conservative | | Swing | ▲0.1 | |

=== Tadley North, Kingsclere & Baughurst ===
Tadley North, Kingsclere & Baughurst
| Party | Candidate | Votes | % | ±% |
|---|---|---|---|---|
| Liberal Democrats | Mike Bound | 1,410 | 47.2 | −4.7 |
| Conservative | Stuart Frost* | 1124 | 37.6 | −10.5 |
| Labour | Matt Russell | 350 | 11.7 | N/A |
| Hampshire Independents | Robert Holliday | 104 | 3.5 | N/A |
| Majority | | | | |
| Turnout | | | | |
| Registered electors | | | | |
| Liberal Democrats gain from Conservative | | Swing | | |

=== Whitchurch, Overton & Laverstoke ===
Whitchurch, Overton & Laverstoke
| Party | Candidate | Votes | % | ±% |
|---|---|---|---|---|
| B&DI | Karen Watts | 1,636 | 54.1 | −8.9 |
| Conservative | Jo Perry | 450 | 14.9 | −3.5 |
| Liberal Democrats | Linda Stepney | 361 | 11.9 | −8.5 |
| Labour | John Jackson | 293 | 9.7 | −0.1 |
| Green | Hina West | 166 | 5.5 | N/A |
| Hampshire Independents | Chris Heath | 117 | 3.9 | N/A |
| Majority | | 1,186 | 39.2 | |
| Turnout | | 2,996 | 35.6 | |
| Registered electors | | 8,412 | | |
| B&DI hold | | Swing | ▼2.7 | |

=== Winklebury & Manydown ===
Winklebury & Manydown
| Party | Candidate | Votes | % | ±% |
|---|---|---|---|---|
| Labour | Angie Freeman* | 886 | 52.9 | +5.0 |
| Conservative | Alex Harwood | 527 | 31.5 | −13.5 |
| Hampshire Independents | Spencer Cleary | 103 | 6.2 | N/A |
| Liberal Democrats | Wendy McKay | 84 | 5.0 | −2.1 |
| Green | Alex Hackett | 74 | 4.4 | N/A |
| Majority | | 359 | 21.4 | |
| Turnout | | 3,034 | 37.6 | |
| Registered electors | | 8,077 | | |
| Labour hold | | Swing | ▲9.3 | |
