= 2024 Basingstoke and Deane Borough Council election =

English local election

- 2 May 2024

18 out of 54 seats to Basingstoke and Deane Borough Council 28 seats needed for a majority

	First party	Second party	Third party
Leader	Simon Minas-Bound	Jacky Tustain	Gavin James
Party	Conservative	Labour	Liberal Democrats
Seats before	23	10	9
Seats won	4	3	4
Seats after	16	11	11
Seat change	▼7	▲1	▲2
Popular vote	13,146	9,973	8,060
Percentage	29.7%	22.5%	18.2%
Swing	0.0%	▼1.6%	▼1.9%
	Fourth party	Fifth party	Sixth party
Leader	Paul Harvey
Party	B&DI	Independent	Green
Seats before	8	3	1
Seats won	4	1	1
Seats after	10	3	2
Seat change	▲2	Steady	▲1
Popular vote	5,442	2,268	2,032
Percentage	18.2%	5.1%	4.6%
Swing	▲1.3%	▲0.8%	▼0.2%
	Seventh party
Party	Women's Equality
Seats before	0
Seats won	1
Seats after	1
Seat change	▲1
Popular vote	1,739
Percentage	3.9%
Swing	▲1.8%
- Winner of each seat at the 2024 Basingstoke and Deane Borough Council election
Leader before election
Paul Harvey
Basingstoke & Deane Independents
No overall control
Leader after election
Paul Harvey
Basingstoke & Deane Independents
No overall control

The 2024 Basingstoke and Deane Borough Council election took place on 2 May 2024 to elect members of Basingstoke and Deane Borough Council in Hampshire, England, alongside other local elections in England and Wales. A third of the council's 54 seats were up for election.

Prior to the election, the council was under no overall control. The Conservatives were the largest party, but the council was being run by a coalition of the Liberal Democrats, the Green Party, and the Basingstoke & Deane Independents. After the election, the council was still under no overall control. The Conservatives remained the largest party, but lost nearly a third of their seats, bringing their seat count down to 16. Labour, the Liberal Democrats, the Green Party, and the Basingstoke & Deane Independents all gained seats from the Conservatives. The same coalition continued to run the council after the election.

Stacy Hart of the Women's Equality Party won a Conservative-held seat in the Hatch Warren and Beggarwood ward, marking the first time a borough councillor for the party has ever been elected.

== Summary ==
=== Election result ===
Basingstoke and Deane Borough Council's composition following the 2024 election.

2024 Basingstoke and Deane Borough Council election
Party	This election				Full council			This election		
Party	Candidates	Seats	Net	Seats %	Other	Total	Total %	Votes	Votes %	+/−
Conservative	{{{candidates}}}	4	▼7	22.2	12	16	29.6	13,146	29.7	±0.0
Labour	{{{candidates}}}	3	▲1	16.7	8	11	20.4	9,973	22.5	–1.6
Liberal Democrats	{{{candidates}}}	4	▲2	22.2	7	11	20.4	8,060	18.2	–1.9
B&DI	{{{candidates}}}	4	▲2	22.2	6	10	18.5	5,442	12.3	+1.3
Independent	{{{candidates}}}	1	Steady	5.6	2	3	5.6	2,268	5.1	+0.8
Green	{{{candidates}}}	1	▲1	5.6	1	2	3.7	2,032	4.6	–0.2
Women's Equality	{{{candidates}}}	1	▲1	5.6	0	1	1.9	1,739	3.9	+1.8
Hampshire Independents	{{{candidates}}}	0	Steady	0.0	0	0	0.0	1,212	2.7	–1.1
Libertarian	{{{candidates}}}	0	Steady	0.0	0	0	0.0	26	0.1	N/A

== Ward results ==
The Statement of Persons Nominated, which details the candidates standing in each ward, was released by Basingstoke and Deane Borough Council following the close of nominations on 5 April 2024. The results were announced the day after the election at around mid-day. Sitting councillors standing for re-election are marked with an asterisk (*).

=== Basing & Upton Grey ===
Basing & Upton Grey
Party	Candidate	Votes	%	±%
Independent	Sheena Grassi	1,564	52.4	N/A
Conservative	Roger Doust	781	26.1	N/A
Labour	Martin Allen	434	14.5	–5.1
Liberal Democrats	Ria Meiszner	182	6.1	–9.8
Libertarian	Alex Zychowski	26	0.8	N/A
Majority		783	26.3	N/A
Turnout		3,004	36.9	–0.1
Registered electors		8,130		
Independent gain from Independent				

=== Bramley ===
Bramley
Party	Candidate	Votes	%	±%
B&DI	Keith Oborn	1,100	46.5	–0.4
Conservative	Nick Robinson*	861	36.4	+4.0
Labour	Adam Coulthard	291	12.3	+1.2
Liberal Democrats	Paula Baker	114	4.8	–4.7
Majority		239	10.1	–2.2
Turnout		2,378	34.1	–0.3
Registered electors		6,969		
B&DI gain from Conservative		Swing	▼2.2	

=== Brighton Hill ===
Brighton Hill
Party	Candidate	Votes	%	±%
Liberal Democrats	Andy Konieczko*	1,096	49.0	+13.1
Labour	Hannah Dawson	768	34.3	–6.5
Conservative	Edward Norman	258	11.5	–2.8
Hampshire Independents	Spencer Cleary	114	5.1	+0.4
Majority		328	14.7	N/A
Turnout		2,245	29.4	+1.1
Registered electors		7,648		
Liberal Democrats hold		Swing	▲9.8	

=== Brookvale & Kings Furlong ===
Brookvale & Kings Furlong
Party	Candidate	Votes	%	±%
Conservative	Arun Mummalaneni*	906	32.9	+5.8
Labour	Zoe Wilson	855	31.0	–6.9
Liberal Democrats	Fran Maritan	720	26.1	+0.5
Green	Anna Jackson	176	6.4	N/A
Hampshire Independents	Alan Stone	99	3.6	–5.8
Majority		51	1.9	N/A
Turnout		2,768	35.3	+4.8
Registered electors		7,820		
Conservative hold		Swing	▲6.4	

=== Chineham ===
Chineham
Party	Candidate	Votes	%	±%
Green	Jonathan Jenkin	987	38.2	+4.0
Conservative	Laura Edwards*	941	36.4	–3.2
Labour	David Bell	406	15.7	+1.0
Reform	Christopher Aldous	140	5.4	N/A
Liberal Democrats	Scott Lawrence	110	4.3	–3.0
Majority		46	1.8	N/A
Turnout		2,597	31.4	+0.7
Registered electors		8,267		
Green gain from Conservative		Swing	▲3.6	

=== Eastrop & Grove ===
Eastrop & Grove
Party	Candidate	Votes	%	±%
Liberal Democrats	Ronald Hussey*	1,398	61.4	–0.7
Labour	Andy Wilson	418	18.4	+6.1
Conservative	Effie Blankson	337	14.8	–0.3
Hampshire Independents	Alexis Smith	124	5.4	+0.8
Majority		980	43.0	–4.0
Turnout		2,289	31.6	–1.3
Registered electors		7,228		
Liberal Democrats hold		Swing	▼3.4	

=== Evingar ===
Evingar
Party	Candidate	Votes	%	±%
Conservative	Jo Perry	1,299	52.8	–0.4
Liberal Democrats	Pauleen Malone	450	18.3	–4.4
Green	Chris Whitehead	360	14.6	+5.6
Hampshire Independents	Phil Heath	165	6.7	–1.4
Labour	Jen Lee	184	7.5	+0.4
Majority		849	34.5	+4.0
Turnout		2,470	33.4	–5.5
Registered electors		7,377		
Conservative hold		Swing	▲2.0	

=== Hatch Warren & Beggarwood ===
Hatch Warren & Beggarwood
Party	Candidate	Votes	%	±%
Women's Equality	Stacy Hart	1,659	59.5	+22.7
Conservative	Taylor Parnell	697	25.0	−14.8
Labour	Peter Bell	338	12.1	−5.6
Liberal Democrats	Marion Wolstencroft	95	3.4	−2.3
Majority		962	34.5	
Turnout		2799	36.8	+3.6
Registered electors		7,592		
Women's Equality gain from Conservative		Swing	▲18.8	

=== Kempshott & Buckskin ===
Kempshott & Buckskin
Party	Candidate	Votes	%	±%
Conservative	Richard Court*	1,163	46.5	+1.8
Labour	Cait Fuller	723	28.9	–7.5
Liberal Democrats	Moira Whitaker	262	10.5	+1.9
Green	Bill Farrington	146	5.8	–0.2
Hampshire Independents	David White	129	5.2	+0.8
Women's Equality	Priya Brown	80	3.2	N/A
Majority		440	17.6	+9.3
Turnout		2,512	30.4	–1.8
Registered electors		8,273		
Conservative hold		Swing	▲4.7	

=== Norden ===
Norden
Party	Candidate	Votes	%	±%
B&DI	Laura James*	1,102	53.4	–5.4
Labour	Jack Wadge-Stacey	572	27.7	+0.4
Conservative	Femi Afolabi	223	10.8	+1.0
Liberal Democrats	Jardine Barrington-Cook	98	4.8	+0.7
Hampshire Independents	David Watson	68	3.3	N/A
Majority		530	25.7	–5.8
Turnout		2,070	28.1	+1.2
Registered electors		7,378		
B&DI hold		Swing	▼2.9	

=== Oakley & The Candovers ===
Oakley & The Candovers
Party	Candidate	Votes	%	±%
B&DI	Julian Jones	1,359	44.9	+11.7
Conservative	Diane Taylor*	1,094	36.1	+0.5
Labour	Bronwyn Phillips	360	11.9	+0.2
Liberal Democrats	Robert Cooper	217	7.2	–5.7
Majority		265	8.8	N/A
Turnout		3,039	39.1	+1.3
Registered electors		7,790		
B&DI gain from Conservative		Swing	▲5.6	

=== Popley ===
Popley
Party	Candidate	Votes	%	±%
Labour	Sajish Tom*	1,148	66.4	+2.3
Conservative	Nsima Udoh	235	13.6	–3.0
Liberal Democrats	Michael Berwick-Gooding	170	9.8	–0.7
Hampshire Independents	Duncan Stone	107	6.2	–2.6
Green	Andrew Toal	69	4.0	N/A
Majority		913	52.8	+5.3
Turnout		1,740	22.9	+0.2
Registered electors		7,611		
Labour hold		Swing	▲2.7	

=== Sherborne St John & Rooksdown ===
Sherborne St John & Rooksdown
Party	Candidate	Votes	%	±%
Conservative	Simon Bound*	1,092	46.6	±0.0
Labour	Bradley Phillips	888	37.9	–0.9
Liberal Democrats	Martin Baker	152	6.5	–3.6
Green	Richard Musson	137	5.8	N/A
Hampshire Independents	Stanley Tennison	74	3.2	–1.3
Majority		204	8.7	+0.9
Turnout		2,359	28.0	+0.6
Registered electors		8,421		
Conservative hold		Swing	▲0.5	

=== South Ham ===
South Ham
Party	Candidate	Votes	%	±%
Labour	Julie Harper	1,068	57.6	–1.5
Conservative	Lily Turner	442	23.8	–2.4
Liberal Democrats	Madeline Hussey	141	7.6	–0.7
Hampshire Independents	Andy Liming	140	7.6	+1.2
Green	Glenn Kala	63	3.4	N/A
Majority		626	33.8	+0.9
Turnout		1,863	24.8	–0.4
Registered electors		7,497		
Labour hold		Swing	▲0.5	

=== Tadley & Pamber ===
Tadley & Pamber
Party	Candidate	Votes	%	±%
Liberal Democrats	Kevin Chatburn	1,393	49.7	+6.5
Conservative	Kerri Carruthers	976	34.8	–4.9
Reform	Christina Jordan	224	8.0	N/A
Labour	Jay Ahuji	211	7.5	–0.2
Majority		417	14.9	+11.4
Turnout		2,815	32.4	–0.2
Registered electors		8,686		
Liberal Democrats gain from Conservative		Swing	▲5.7	

=== Tadley North, Kingsclere & Baughurst ===
Tadley North, Kingsclere & Baughurst
Party	Candidate	Votes	%	±%
Liberal Democrats	David Conquest	1,125	39.1	–8.1
Conservative	Stuart Frost	765	26.6	–11.0
Independent	Ken Rhatigan*	704	24.5	N/A
Labour	Matt Russell	282	9.8	–1.9
Majority		360	12.5	+2.9
Turnout		2,887	34.3	
Registered electors		8,412		
Liberal Democrats gain from Conservative		Swing	▲1.5	

=== Whitchurch, Overton & Laverstoke ===
Whitchurch, Overton & Laverstoke
Party	Candidate	Votes	%	±%
B&DI	Colin Phillimore*	1,881	64.2	+10.1
Conservative	Tom Thacker	396	13.5	–1.4
Labour	Callum Hunter	321	11.0	+1.3
Liberal Democrats	Matthew Kaschula	230	7.8	–4.1
Hampshire Independents	Neil Fellman	102	3.5	–0.4
Majority		1,485	50.7	+11.5
Turnout		2,944	36.6	+1.0
Registered electors		8,034		
B&DI hold		Swing	▲5.8	

=== Winklebury & Manydown ===
Winklebury & Manydown
Party	Candidate	Votes	%	±%
Labour Co-op	Zander West	706	42.3	–10.6
Conservative	Abigail Compton-Burnett*	680	40.8	+9.3
Liberal Democrats	Lindsay Benjamin	98	5.9	+0.9
Green	Mark Wallace	94	5.6	+1.2
Hampshire Independents	Anna-Marie Moynihan	90	5.4	–0.8
Majority		26	1.5	–19.9
Turnout		1,681	30.7	–6.9
Registered electors		5,477		
Labour Co-op gain from Conservative		Swing	▼10.0	
