= 2022 Basingstoke and Deane Borough Council election =

2022 UK local government election

2022 Basingstoke and Deane Borough Council
- 5 May 2022

19 out of 54 seats to Basingstoke and Deane Borough Council 28 seats needed for a majority

	First party	Second party
Party	Conservative	Labour
Last election	33 seats, 48.8%	10 seats, 19.4%
Seats won	7	4
Seats after	29	10
Seat change	▼4	Steady
Popular vote	17,225	8,799
Percentage	35.7%	18.3%
Swing	▼13.1%	▼1.1%
	Third party	Fourth party
Party	B&DI	Liberal Democrats
Last election	5 seats, 6.1%	5 seats, 18.1%
Seats won	4	4
Seats after	8	7
Seat change	▲2	▲2
Popular vote	7,046	11,251
Percentage	14.6%	23.3%
Swing	▲8.5%	▲5.2%
- Winner of each seat at the 2022 Basingstoke and Deane Borough Council election
Council control before election
Conservative
Council control after election
Conservative

Elections to Basingstoke and Deane Borough Council took place on 5 May 2022 as part of the 2022 United Kingdom local elections.

== Summary ==
=== Election result ===
2022 Basingstoke and Deane Borough Council
Party	This election				Full council			This election		
Party	Candidates	Seats	Net	Seats %	Other	Total	Total %	Votes	Votes %	+/−
Conservative	{{{candidates}}}	7	▼4	38.9	22	29	53.7	17,225	35.7	-13.1
Labour	{{{candidates}}}	4	Steady	16.7	6	10	18.5	8,799	18.3	-1.1
B&DI	{{{candidates}}}	4	▲2	22.2	4	8	14.9	7,046	14.6	+8.5
Liberal Democrats	{{{candidates}}}	4	▲2	22.2	3	7	13.0	11,251	23.3	+5.2
Hampshire Independents	{{{candidates}}}	0	Steady	0.0	0	0	0.0	1,959	4.1	+0.4
Green	{{{candidates}}}	0	Steady	0.0	0	0	0.0	1,169	2.4	+1.2
Women's Equality	{{{candidates}}}	0	Steady	0.0	0	0	0.0	566	1.2	+0.9
ADF	{{{candidates}}}	0	Steady	0.0	0	0	0.0	175	0.4	N/A

== Ward results ==
=== Basing & Upton Grey ===
Basing & Upton Grey
Party	Candidate	Votes	%	±%
Conservative	Catherine Tuck	1,947	62.0	+6.4
Labour	Holly Hopgood	550	17.5	+1.8
Liberal Democrats	Richard Lilleker	435	13.8	−3.1
Hampshire Independents	Anna-Marie Moynihan	210	6.7	−5.1
Majority		1,397	44.5	
Turnout		3,154	39.3	
Conservative hold		Swing	▲2.3	

=== Bramley ===
Bramley
Party	Candidate	Votes	%	±%
B&DI	Anthony Durrant	1,330	54.4	+24.7
Conservative	Simon Mahaffey	938	38.4	+4.7
ADF	Sarah Packman	175	7.2	N/A
Majority		392	16.0	
Turnout		2,462	36.5	
B&DI gain from Conservative		Swing	▲10.0	

=== Brighton Hill ===
Brighton Hill
Party	Candidate	Votes	%	±%
Liberal Democrats	Andrea Bowes	937	42.5	+9.8
Labour	Olivia Phipps	561	25.4	−5.5
Conservative	Poonam Gurung	537	24.3	−0.7
Hampshire Independents	Lucy Dean	171	7.8	−1.2
Majority		376	17.1	
Turnout		2,217	28.6	
Liberal Democrats hold		Swing	▲7.7	

=== Brookvale & Kings Furlong ===
Brookvale & Kings Furlong
Party	Candidate	Votes	%	±%
Labour	Michael Howard-Sorrell	1,000	38.6	+8.5
Conservative	Kishor Patel	806	31.1	−4.1
Liberal Democrats	Francesca Maritan	584	22.5	−1.0
Hampshire Independents	Alan Stone	203	7.8	−3.4
Majority		194	7.5	
Turnout		2,601	34.5	
Labour hold		Swing	▲6.3	

=== Chineham ===
Chineham
Party	Candidate	Votes	%	±%
Conservative	Jennifer Vaux	1,263	50.6	+4.7
Green	Jonathan Jenkin	553	22.1	+7.4
Labour	David Bell	446	17.9	+6.3
Liberal Democrats	Scott Lawrence	235	9.4	+1.3
Majority		710	28.5	
Turnout		2,514	31.5	
Conservative hold		Swing	▼1.4	

=== Eastrop & Grove ===
Eastrop & Grove
Party	Candidate	Votes	%	±%
Liberal Democrats	John McKay	1,415	58.9	+10.9
Conservative	Effie Blankson	415	17.3	−1.3
Labour	Kieran Kerswell	336	14.0	−0.6
Women's Equality	Priya Brown	156	6.5	−7.4
Hampshire Independents	Alexis Smith	79	3.3	−1.6
Majority		1,000	41.6	
Turnout		2,409	33.5	
Liberal Democrats hold		Swing	▲6.1	

=== Evingar ===
Evingar
Party	Candidate	Votes	%	±%
Conservative	Samuel Carr	1,535	55.4	−2.9
Liberal Democrats	Pauleen Malone	909	32.8	+6.8
Hampshire Independents	Philip Heath	329	11.9	N/A
Majority		626	22.6	
Turnout		2,788	37.8	
Conservative hold		Swing	▼4.9	

=== Hatch Warren & Beggarwood ===
Hatch Warren & Beggarwood
Party	Candidate	Votes	%	±%
Conservative	Samir Kotecha	741	31.1	−10.7
Labour	Thomas Cusack	461	19.4	−2.6
Women's Equality	Stacy Hart	410	17.2	N/A
B&DI	Julian Jones	360	15.1	N/A
Liberal Democrats	Marion Wolstencroft	184	7.7	−11.1
Green	Stephen Philpotts	155	6.5	N/A
Hampshire Independents	Spencer Cleary	68	2.9	−14.5
Majority		280	11.7	
Turnout		2,383	31.6	
Conservative hold		Swing	▼4.1	

=== Kempshott & Buckskin ===
Kempshott & Buckskin
Party	Candidate	Votes	%	±%
Conservative	Hayley Eachus	1,173	45.2	−1.6
Labour	Kim Taylor	823	31.7	+11.3
Liberal Democrats	Stavroulla O'Doherty	260	10.0	−2.7
Green	William Farrington	221	8.5	−4.8
Hampshire Independents	David White	117	4.5	−2.3
Majority		350	13.5	
Turnout		2,603	31.6	
Conservative hold		Swing	▼6.5	

=== Norden ===
Norden
Party	Candidate	Votes	%	±%
B&DI	Paul Basham	1,020	48.1	+12.3
Labour	Stephen Rolfe	651	30.7	+3.0
Conservative	Shatrugan Sookhun	315	14.9	−2.4
Liberal Democrats	Jardine Barrington-Cook	96	4.5	−2.9
Hampshire Independents	Duncan Stone	37	1.7	−7.9
Majority		369	17.4	
Turnout		2,133	29.4	
B&DI gain from Labour		Swing	▲4.7	

=== Oakley & The Candovers ===
Oakley & The Candovers
Party	Candidate	Votes	%	±%
Conservative	Paul Gaskell	1,392	51.3	−0.5
Liberal Democrats	Robert Cooper	996	36.7	+15.0
Hampshire Independents	Richard Neville	328	12.1	+0.1
Majority		396	14.6	
Turnout		2,733	37.4	
Conservative hold		Swing	▼7.8	

=== Popley ===
Popley
Party	Candidate	Votes	%	±%
Labour	Marc Connor	780	40.0	+5.8
B&DI	David Potter	520	26.7	+1.2
Conservative	Nsima Udoh	443	22.7	+2.3
Liberal Democrats	Michael Berwick-Gooding	172	8.8	±0.0
Hampshire Independents	Stephen James-Bailey	33	1.7	−9.3
Majority		260	13.3	
Turnout		1,952	25.6	
Labour hold		Swing	▲2.3	

=== Sherborne St. John & Rooksdown ===
Sherborne St. John & Rooksdown
Party	Candidate	Votes	%	±%
Conservative	David McIntyre	963	45.7	−2.3
Labour	Bradley Phillips	728	34.6	+11.3
Liberal Democrats	Alexander Forrow	415	19.7	+0.1
Majority		235	11.1	
Turnout		2,120	26.4	
Conservative hold		Swing	▼6.8	

=== South Ham ===
South Ham
Party	Candidate	Votes	%	±%
Labour	Antony Jones	1,178	55.9	+9.7
Conservative	Praveen Singh	569	27.0	−7.4
Liberal Democrats	Jordan Barry	203	9.6	+0.8
Hampshire Independents	Andrew Liming	159	7.5	−3.1
Majority		609	28.9	
Turnout		2,120	28.3	
Labour hold		Swing	▲8.6	

=== Tadley & Pamber ===
Tadley & Pamber
Party	Candidate	Votes	%	±%
Liberal Democrats	Josephine Slimin	1,277	43.7	+13.6
Conservative	Derek Mellor	1,178	40.3	−10.0
Green	Richard Musson	240	8.2	N/A
Hampshire Independents	Charlotte Bennett	225	7.7	+0.1
Majority		99	3.4	
Turnout		2,927	33.8	
Liberal Democrats gain from Conservative		Swing	▲11.8	

=== Tadley North, Kingsclere & Baughurst ===
Tadley North, Kingsclere & Baughurst
Party	Candidate	Votes	%	±%
Liberal Democrats	Kerry Morrow	1,617	51.9	+22.6
Conservative	Maria Higson	1,497	48.1	+1.4
Majority		120	3.8	
Turnout		3,141	37.4	
Liberal Democrats gain from Conservative		Swing	▲10.6	

=== Whitchurch, Overton & Laverstoke ===
Whitchurch, Overton & Laverstoke (2 seats due to by-election)
Party	Candidate	Votes	%	±%
B&DI	Chloe Ashfield	2,082	63.0	+10.8
B&DI	Stephen Williams	1,734	52.5	+0.9
Liberal Democrats	Lucyna Sloane Williams	700	21.2	+3.5
Liberal Democrats	Linda Stepney	674	20.4	+6.6
Conservative	Johanna Perry	609	18.4	−6.5
Labour	Michael Barham	324	9.8	−2.0
Turnout		3,304	41.1	
B&DI hold				
B&DI hold				

=== Winklebury & Manydown ===
Winklebury & Manydown
Party	Candidate	Votes	%	±%
Labour	Alexander Lee	961	47.9	+7.3
Conservative	Sean Dillow	904	45.0	+2.0
Liberal Democrats	Wendy McKay	142	7.1	−1.8
Majority		57	2.9	
Turnout		2,026	37.2	
Labour gain from Conservative		Swing	▲2.7	
