= 2021 Basingstoke and Deane Borough Council election =

2021 UK local government election

- 6 May 2021

All 54 seats to Basingstoke and Deane Borough Council 28 seats needed for a majority
	First party	Second party	Third party
Party	Conservative	Labour	Liberal Democrats
Last election	12	4	4
Seats before	28	13	7
Seats won	33	10	5
	Fourth party	Fifth party
Party	B&DI	Independent
Seats before	11
Seats won	5	1
- Map of the results
Council control before election
Conservative
Council control after election
Conservative

Elections to Basingstoke and Deane Borough Council took place on 6 May 2021 as part of the 2021 United Kingdom local elections. They took place at the same time as the elections for Hampshire County Council and the Hampshire Police and Crime Commissioner.

== Background ==
Whilst an election for the County Council had already been planned, District Council Elections were delayed due to the ongoing COVID-19 pandemic, meaning that they are due to be held at the same time as the Hampshire County Council Elections.

The Conservatives won 12 seats at the previous election, with Labour and the Liberal Democrats winning 4 each. Subsequent to the 2019 election, initially nine former Labour Councillors joined with existing independent councillors to form the Basingstoke & Deane Independent Group, which by May 2021 had 10 borough councillors, sitting as part of The Independent Forum alongside an independent. Alongside the Basingstoke & Deane Independents, the newly founded county-wide Hampshire Independents are also standing several candidates.

The Statement of persons nominated was revealed on Friday 9 April 2021.

== Results ==
The Conservatives won 33 seats across the district, whilst Labour won 10, the Liberal Democrats and Basingstoke & Deane Independents won 5 seats each, and a non-affiliated independent won a seat.

2021 Basingstoke & Deane Borough Council election
Party	Seats	Gains	Losses	Net gain/loss	Seats %	Votes %	Votes	+/−
Conservative	33	0	0	Steady	61.1	48.8	61,992	
Labour	10	0	0	▼11	18.5	19.4	24,677	
Liberal Democrats	5	0	0	▼2	9.3	18.1	22,925	
B&DI	5	0	0	▲5	9.3	6.1	7,800	
Independent	1	0	0	Steady	1.9	2.3	2,903	
Hampshire Ind.	0	0	0	Steady	0.0	3.7	4,681	
Green	0	0	0	Steady	0.0	1.2	1,461	
Women's Equality	0	0	0	Steady	0.0	0.3	422	
TUSC	0	0	0	Steady	0.0	0.1	129	

== Results by Ward ==
=== Basing & Upton Grey ===
Basing & Upton Grey
Party	Candidate	Votes	%	±%
Conservative	Sven Howard Godesen	2,207	63.8	
Conservative	Onnalee Virginia Cubitt	2,118	61.2	
Conservative	Mark Beresford Ruffell	1,960	56.6	
Liberal Democrats	Richard Mark Lilleker	675	19.5	
Liberal Democrats	James Anthony Kennan	624	18.0	
Labour	Beth Lowe	623	18.0	
Hampshire Independents	Anna Moynihan	467	13.5	
Majority				
Turnout		3,461		
Conservative win (new seat)				
Conservative win (new seat)				
Conservative win (new seat)				

=== Bramley ===
Bramley
Party	Candidate	Votes	%	±%
Conservative	Nick Robinson	1,426	53.1	
B&DI	Chris Tomblin	1,259	46.9	
Conservative	Simon Heelum Mahaffey	1,142	42.5	
Conservative	Nalin Mahinda Jayawardena	1,098	40.9	
Liberal Democrats	Mark Edmund Scott	649	24.2	
Labour	Lydia Massey	475	17.7	
Hampshire Independents	Christine Heath	428	15.9	
Majority				
Turnout		2,686		
Conservative win (new seat)				
B&DI win (new seat)				
Conservative win (new seat)				

=== Brighton Hill ===
Brighton Hill
Party	Candidate	Votes	%	±%
Liberal Democrats	Andy Konieczko	868	35.7	
Labour	Andy McCormick	824	33.9	
Liberal Democrats	Andrea Karen Bowes	725	29.8	
Conservative	Simon Leigh Carr	665	27.3	
Labour	Kim Rosemarie Taylor	647	26.6	
Liberal Democrats	Peter Roy Hird Whitaker	614	25.2	
Labour	Stephen John Rolfe	589	24.2	
Conservative	William Damian Stuart Rouse	569	23.4	
Conservative	Praveen Singh	509	20.9	
Hampshire Independents	Alan Harvey Stone	237	9.7	
TUSC	Ben McDonnell	66	2.7	
Majority				
Turnout		2,434		
Liberal Democrats win (new seat)				
Labour win (new seat)				
Liberal Democrats win (new seat)				

=== Brookvale & Kings Furlong ===
Brookvale & Kings Furlong Ward
Party	Candidate	Votes	%	±%
Conservative	Arun Mummalaneni	945	36.7	
Conservative	Sam Jeans	860	33.4	
Labour	Michael Howard-Sorrell	806	31.3	
Labour	Simon James Martin	774	30.0	
Labour	Julie Katherine Pierce	727	28.2	
Conservative	Edward Michael Norman	666	25.8	
Liberal Democrats	Ryan James Hickling	631	24.5	
Liberal Democrats	Francesca Delfina Maritan	512	19.9	
Liberal Democrats	Scott Richard Lawrence	461	17.9	
Hampshire Independents	Stan Tennison	301	11.7	
Majority		85		
Turnout		2,577		
Conservative win (new seat)				
Conservative win (new seat)				
Labour win (new seat)				

=== Chineham ===
Chineham
Party	Candidate	Votes	%	±%
Conservative	Laura Jane Edwards	1,711	64.2	
Conservative	Paul Edward Miller	1,478	55.5	
Conservative	Jenny Vaux	1,335	50.1	
Green	Jonathan Edward Jenkin	551	20.7	
Independent	Jo Walke	532	20.0	
Labour	Maria Ines French	432	16.2	
Liberal Democrats	Stephen David Whitechurch	304	11.4	
Labour	Nigel Wooldridge	303	11.4	
Green	Richard John Musson	230	8.6	
Green	Stephen Murray Philpotts	206	7.7	
Hampshire Independents	Dave Watson	197	7.4	
Majority				
Turnout		2,664		
Conservative win (new seat)				
Conservative win (new seat)				
Conservative win (new seat)				

=== Eastrop & Grove ===
Eastrop & Grove
Party	Candidate	Votes	%	±%
Liberal Democrats	Ronald John Hussey	1,459	55.2	
Liberal Democrats	James Gavin	1,312	49.6	
Liberal Democrats	John Gavin Neil McKay	1,211	45.8	
Conservative	Effie Grant	565	21.4	
Conservative	Seb Courtois	562	21.2	
Conservative	Steve Vaux	526	19.9	
Labour	Kieran James Kerswell	443	16.7	
Women's Equality	Priya Ishwari Brown	422	16.0	
Labour	Andrew Robert Wilson	313	11.8	
Hampshire Independents	Seem Alsasa	148	5.6	
Majority				
Turnout		2,645		
Liberal Democrats win (new seat)				
Liberal Democrats win (new seat)				
Liberal Democrats win (new seat)				

=== Evingar ===
Evingar
Party	Candidate	Votes	%	±%
Conservative	Graham Falconer	2,007	66.5	
Conservative	John Richard Izett	1,954	64.7	
Conservative	Samuel David Carr	1,635	54.1	
Liberal Democrats	Pauleen Malone	897	29.7	
Liberal Democrats	Linda Rosemary Stepney	651	21.6	
Labour	Robert George Thomas	544	18.0	
Majority				
Turnout		3,020		
Conservative win (new seat)				
Conservative win (new seat)				
Conservative win (new seat)				

=== Hatch Warren & Beggarwood ===
Hatch Warren & Beggarwood
Party	Candidate	Votes	%	±%
Conservative	Rebecca Louise Bean	1,299	51.6	
Conservative	Dan Putty	1,261	50.1	
Conservative	Samir Sureshchandra Kotecha	918	36.5	
Labour	Trish Case	682	27.1	
Labour	Tom Cusack	648	25.7	
Liberal Democrats	Ted Blackmore-Squires	586	23.3	
Hampshire Independents	Spencer Cleary	538	21.4	
Majority				
Turnout		2,518		
Conservative win (new seat)				
Conservative win (new seat)				
Conservative win (new seat)				

=== Kempshott & Buckskin ===
Kempshott & Buckskin
Party	Candidate	Votes	%	±%
Conservative	Richard Court	1,668	55.1	
Conservative	Peter Aji	1,387	45.9	
Conservative	Hayley Kristina Eachus	1,352	44.7	
Labour	Walter Bell McCormick	729	24.1	
Labour	David Ferguson Bell	715	23.6	
Labour	Karl James Stewart	553	18.3	
Green	Bill Farrington	474	15.7	
Liberal Democrats	Marion Ruth Wolstencroft	452	14.9	
Liberal Democrats	Stav O'Doherty	387	12.8	
Hampshire Independents	David John White	241	8.0	
Majority				
Turnout		3,025		
Conservative win (new seat)				
Conservative win (new seat)				
Conservative win (new seat)				

=== Norden ===
Norden
Party	Candidate	Votes	%	±%
B&DI	Laura James	1,052	46.1	
B&DI	Paul Duncan Harvey	1,005	44.0	
Labour	Carolyn Moorhouse Wooldridge	815	35.7	
Labour	Jack Murphy	669	29.3	
Labour	Stephen William Drake	634	27.8	
Conservative	Michael Robert Archer	507	22.2	
Conservative	Andrew Peter John Clarke	397	17.4	
Conservative	Jim Holder	340	14.9	
Hampshire Independents	Phil Heath	283	12.4	
Liberal Democrats	Jardine Ian Barrington-Cook	218	9.6	
TUSC	Mayola Evelien Demmenie	63	2.8	
Majority				
Turnout		2,282		
B&DI win (new seat)				
B&DI win (new seat)				
Labour win (new seat)				

=== Oakley & The Candovers ===
Oakley & The Candovers
Party	Candidate	Votes	%	±%
Conservative	Diane Marilyn Taylor	1,906	62.1	
Conservative	Hannah Elizabeth Golding	1,900	61.9	
Conservative	Paul Gaskell	1,532	49.9	
Liberal Democrats	Paula Baker	800	26.1	
Liberal Democrats	Robert Charles Cooper	696	22.7	
Labour	Ian Peter Edney	539	17.6	
Hampshire Independents	Lucy Dean	441	14.4	
Majority				
Turnout		3,070		
Conservative win (new seat)				
Conservative win (new seat)				
Conservative win (new seat)				

=== Popley ===
Popley
Party	Candidate	Votes	%	±%
Labour	Sajish Tom	857	41.1	
Labour	Jacky Tustain	775	37.1	
Labour	Grant Donohoe	754	36.1	
B&DI	David Alan Potter	638	30.6	
Conservative	Satya Sookhun	512	24.5	
Conservative	Mark Graham Budden	487	23.3	
Conservative	Deborah Elizabeth Moss	399	19.1	
Hampshire Independents	Steve James-Bailey	275	13.2	
Liberal Democrats	Lindsay Alistair Benjamin	220	10.5	
Liberal Democrats	Michael Berwick-Gooding	220	10.5	
Majority				
Turnout		2,087		
Labour win (new seat)				
Labour win (new seat)				
Labour win (new seat)				

=== Sherborne St John & Rooksdown ===
Sherborne St John & Rooksdown
Party	Candidate	Votes	%	±%
Conservative	Simon Edward Bound	1,403	57.4	
Conservative	Jay Ganesh	1,185	48.4	
Conservative	Tristan Wyatt Robinson	1,160	47.4	
Labour	Samir Chekini	679	27.8	
Labour	Criss Connor	653	26.7	
Liberal Democrats	Martin John Baker	571	23.3	
Hampshire Independents	Pete King	266	10.9	
Majority				
Turnout		2,446		
Conservative win (new seat)				
Conservative win (new seat)				
Conservative win (new seat)				

=== South Ham ===
South Ham
Party	Candidate	Votes	%	±%
Labour	Stephanie Jane	1,074	47.9	
Labour	Gary John Watts	990	44.1	
Labour	Tony Jones	891	39.7	
Conservative	Lillian Phoebe Turner	799	35.6	
Conservative	David Peter O'Donnell	722	32.2	
Conservative	Neil Madresfield	795	35.4	
Hampshire Independents	Duncan Philip Stone	247	11.0	
Liberal Democrats	Madeline Hussey	205	9.1	
Liberal Democrats	Michael Gavin McKay	178	7.9	
Majority				
Turnout		2,244		
Labour win (new seat)				
Labour win (new seat)				
Labour win (new seat)				

=== Tadley & Pamber ===
Tadley & Pamber
Party	Candidate	Votes	%	±%
Conservative	David Alan Leeks	1,678	52.6	
Conservative	Kerri Elizbeth Carruthers	1,583	49.6	
Conservative	Derek Preston Mellor	1,480	46.4	
Liberal Democrats	Jo Slimin	1,004	31.4	
Liberal Democrats	Mike Bound	819	25.6	
Liberal Democrats	Steve Gibbons	638	20.0	
Labour	Elliott Oliver Gardiner	396	12.4	
Labour	Simon David Reeves	374	11.7	
Labour	Matt Russell	356	11.1	
Hampshire Independents	Charlotte Beatrice Margaret	253	7.9	
Majority				
Turnout		3,193		
Conservative win (new seat)				
Conservative win (new seat)				
Conservative win (new seat)				

=== Tadley North, Kingsclere & Baughurst ===
Tadley North, Kingsclere & Baughurst
Party	Candidate	Votes	%	±%
Conservative	Ken Rhatigan	1,759	52.2	
Conservative	Stuart Michael Frost	1,591	47.3	
Conservative	Geoff Poland	1,404	41.7	
Liberal Democrats	Warwick Godfrey Lovegrove	1,106	32.8	
Liberal Democrats	Kerry Morrow	843	25.0	
Liberal Democrats	Ria Meiszner	831	24.7	
Independent	Ray Peach	481	14.3	
Labour	Lee Morgan	421	12.5	
Labour	Stephen David Rothman	364	10.8	
Majority				
Turnout		3,367		
Conservative win (new seat)				
Conservative win (new seat)				
Conservative win (new seat)				

=== Whitchurch, Overton & Laverstoke ===
Whitchurch, Overton & Laverstoke
Party	Candidate	Votes	%	±%
B&DI	Colin John William Phillimore	1,935	52.2	
B&DI	Ian Tilbury	1,911	51.6	
Independent	Lucie Follett Maitland	1,890	51.0	
Conservative	James William Aris	921	24.9	
Liberal Democrats	Lucy Sloane Williams	654	17.7	
Conservative	Johanna Elizabeth	648	17.5	
Conservative	Jonathan Richards	594	16.0	
Liberal Democrats	Alex Hands	513	13.8	
Labour	Marc Connor	438	11.8	
Liberal Democrats	Adi Harris	205	5.5	
Hampshire Independents	Robert John Holliday	201	5.4	
Majority				
Turnout		3,704		
B&DI win (new seat)				
B&DI win (new seat)				
Independent win (new seat)				

=== Winklebury & Manydown ===
Winklebury & Manydown
Party	Candidate	Votes	%	±%
Conservative	Abigail Compton-Burnett	902	45.6	
Labour	Angie Freeman	852	43.0	
Conservative	Sean Patmore Dillow	799	40.4	
Conservative	Mike Patchett	766	38.7	
Labour	Alex Lee	667	33.7	
Labour	Declan Huxley	652	32.9	
Liberal Democrats	Wendy Elizabeth McKay	186	9.4	
Hampshire Independents	Scott Neville	158	8.0	
Majority				
Turnout		1,980		
Conservative win (new seat)				
Labour win (new seat)				
Conservative win (new seat)				
