= All or Nothing =

All or Nothing may refer to:

== Film and television ==
- All or Nothing (film), a 2002 film by Mike Leigh
- All or Nothing (game show), a 2004–2005 Russian game show based on Deal or No Deal
- All or Nothing (sports docuseries), an Amazon Prime series since 2016
- "All or Nothing" (Glee), a 2013 television episode
- "All or Nothing" (Wiseguy), a 1989 television episode
- "All or Nothing", a 2014 episode of The Amazing Race 25

== Games and gaming ==
- All or Nothing (lottery), a game format offered by multiple lotteries in the United States
- All or Nothing (video game), a computer game for the ZX Spectrum

== Music ==
=== Albums ===
- All or Nothin' (54th Platoon album), 2003
- All or Nothin' (Nikki Lane album), 2014
- All or Nothing (Calyx and Teebee album), 2012
- All or Nothing (Fat Joe album), 2005
- All or Nothing (Jamala album) or the title song, 2013
- All or Nothing (Jay Sean album) or the title song (see below), 2009
- All or Nothing (Luba album), 1989
- All or Nothing (Mikeschair album) or the title song, 2014
- All or Nothing (Milli Vanilli album), a Europe-only release, or the title song (see below), 1988
  - All or Nothing (Milli Vanilli remix album), the European version of the U.S. release Girl You Know It's True, 1989
- All or Nothing (Pennywise album) or the title song, 2012
- All or Nothing (Prime Circle album), 2008
- All or Nothing (Shopping album) or the title song, 2020
- All or Nothing (The Subways album) or the title song, 2008
- All or Nothing, by Aynsley Lister, 2002
- All or Nothing, by Christopher Lawrence, 2004
- Trill Entertainment Presents: All or Nothing, a compilation album, 2010

=== Songs ===
- "All or Nothing" (Cher song), 1999
- "All or Nothing" (Fiction Factory song), 1984
- "All or Nothing" (Joe song), 1994
- "All or Nothing" (KT Tunstall song), 2016
- "All or Nothing" (Milli Vanilli song), 1989
- "All or Nothing" (O-Town song), 2001
- "All or Nothing" (Small Faces song), 1966
- "All or Nothing" (Theory of a Deadman song), 2008
- "All Er Nuthin'", a song from the musical Oklahoma!, 1943
- "All or Nothin'", by Tom Petty and the Heartbreakers from Into the Great Wide Open, 1991
- "All or Nothing", by Au Revoir Simone from Still Night, Still Light, 2009
- "All or Nothing", by Eddi Reader from Mirmama, 1992
- "All or Nothing", by Europe from Prisoners in Paradise, 1991
- "All or Nothing", by Jay Sean from My Own Way, 2008
- "All or Nothing", by Lost Frequencies from Less Is More, 2016
- "All or Nothing", by Natalia from Wise Girl, 2009
- "All or Nothing", by Naughty Boy, 2018
- "All or Nothing", by Nayeon from Im Nayeon, 2022
- "All or Nothing", by Ratt from Detonator, 1990
- "All or Nothing", by Takako Mamiya from Love Trip, 1982
- "All or Nothing", by Topic and HRVY, 2022
- "All or Nothing", by WEi from Identity: Challenge, 2021

== Other uses ==
- All or nothing (armor), a method of armouring battleships
- All or nothing option or binary option, a financial exotic option
- All-or-nothing thinking or splitting, a psychological disorder or defense mechanism
- All-or-nothing transform, in cryptography, an encryption mode
- All-or-nothing mechanism, in horology, a part of a repeater

== See also ==
- A todo o nada ("All or nothing"), an Argentine game show first aired in 2005
- "All or Nothing at All", a 1939 song by Arthur Altman and Jack Lawrence
- All or Nothing at All (album), a 1958 album by Billie Holiday
- All for Nothing (disambiguation)
- Atomicity (database systems), a property that indicates that, in a series of database operations, either all occur or nothing occurs
- False dilemma, a type of informal fallacy in which only two alternatives are considered
- All In (disambiguation)
