= Basingstoke & Deane Independents =

Localist Party and Group on Basingstoke and Deane Council

Basingstoke and Deane Independents
- Abbreviation: BDI
- Leader: Cllr Christopher Tomblin
- Founded: 2019
- Merger of: Former Labour and independent Councillors
- Ideology: Localism
- Council Group: The Independent Forum
- Basingstoke and Deane Council: 12 / 54

The Independent Forum Basingstoke and Deane Independent Forum
- Leader: Cllr Paul Harvey
- Parties: B&D Independents (11); Independents (3); Green Party (2); All In Party (1)
- Basingstoke and Deane Council: 19 / 54

Website
- basingstokedeaneindependentforum.org

Basingstoke & Deane Independents are a localist political party in the district of Basingstoke and Deane in Hampshire. They are part of the Basingstoke & Deane Independent Forum, which also comprises independent, Green, and All In councillors, and which currently runs the district council alongside the Liberal Democrats, with Independent Forum group leader Paul Harvey serving as leader of the council.

== History ==
The party was launched in December 2019 by two existing independent councillors and nine sitting Labour councillors, including the former Labour group leader and deputy leader. It was set up as a localist group, with a focus on supporting vulnerable groups, tackling the climate emergency, housing and planning, and social equality. One councillor, Carolyn Wooldridge, quickly returned to Labour in January 2020. Six Basingstoke & Deane Independent candidates stood in the delayed 2021 local election, with all but one holding their seats, with incumbent Popley councillor David Potter losing his seat, leaving them with five overall. They did not contest the 2021 Hampshire County Council election. The party stood six candidates in 2022, winning four of which three were gains, bringing their total seats to eight. This included two out of three seats in Bramley ward, gaining one from the Conservatives, with winning candidate Anthony Durrant having previously stood as an independent in North East Hampshire in 2019 and chairing Bramley Parish Council. The new councillors raised the climate and housing development as concerns. In December 2022 Councillor Michael Howard-Sorrell left the Labour Party to sit as an independent, but did not join the Basingstoke and Deane Independents, instead later joining the Green Party which sits as part of The Independent Forum. Prior to the 2023 elections, former mayor Cllr Onnalee Cubitt was expelled from the Conservative Party after criticising local projects, and joined the Independent Forum Group whilst remaining as an independent.

In the 2023 local elections the party stood four candidates, winning three and remaining with eight councillors. The council changed to no overall control, with the Conservatives remaining the largest party but without a majority for the first time in 17 years. Basingstoke and Deane Independents Cllr Paul Harvey was elected leader of the Independent Forum group and as leader of the council, replacing Conservative Simon Minas-Bound; Harvey previously held the post in 2005/2006 as a Labour councillor. The new administration was made up of the Independent Forum and the Liberal Democrats, with Liberal Democrat group leader Cllr Gavin James announced as the Deputy Leader, referred to as Co-Leader, and with both Independent Forum and Liberal Democrats sitting on cabinet.

The Basingstoke and Deane Independents stood four candidates in 2024, holding two and gaining two from the Conservatives. At the same time a further Green won a seat and the Women's Equality Party won its first district-level seat in Hatch Warren & Beggarwood, and joined the Independent Forum after the election. Subsequent to the election, Cllr Samir Kotecha, who was elected for as a Conservative in 2022 in Hatch Warren and Beggarwood Ward, joined the party. Combined with the gains, this brought the Basingstoke and Deane Independents to eleven seats in total, and the Independent Forum to seventeen. The group remained in administration with the Liberal Democrats who themselves gained two seats, with the cabinet remaining the same.

After the Women's Equality Party was dissolved, WEP Cllr Stacy Hart founded the All In Party, which continues to be part of the Independent Forum and administration.

In April 2025 Labour councillor Marc Connor defected to Basingstoke & Deane Independents, with a call for a by-election from the Conservative's Minas-Bound. In the May 2026 elections the party held three seats, gained one from the Conservatives, and lost one to Independent Forum members All In without contesting the seat, with the council still in no overall control. By polling, the party came fourth with 8,101 votes (12.7%}. The Independent Forum, still in administration, rose to 19 seats overall.

== Electoral results ==
The following are electoral results for the Basingstoke & Deane Independents only, not including other Independent Forum members

Year	Votes	%	+/-	Seats	Council Control
2021	7,800	6.1%	Steady	5 / 54	Conservative
2022	7,046	14.6%	▲8.5	8 / 54	Conservative
2023	4,818	11.0%	▼1.9	8 / 54	No overall control
2024	5,442	12.3%	▲1.3	10 / 54	No overall control
2026	8,101	12.7%	▲0.4	12 / 54	No overall control

== See also ==
- Community Campaign (Hart)
- Portsmouth Independents Party
- Southampton Independents
