= 2021 Hampshire County Council election =

2021 UK local government election

- 6 May 2021

All 78 seats to Hampshire County Council 40 seats needed for a majority

	First party	Second party	Third party
Party	Conservative	Liberal Democrats	Labour
Last election	56 seats, 52.2%	19 seats, 26.9%	2 seats, 10.6%
Seats won	56	17	3
Seat change	Steady	▼2	▲1
Popular vote	206,538	109,212	51,336
Percentage	50.7%	26.8%	12.6%
Swing	▼1.5%	▼0.1%	▲2.0%
	Fourth party	Fifth party	Sixth party
Party	Independent	WBCP	CCH
Last election	0 seats, 1.3%	did not exist	1 seat, 1.4%
Seats won	1	1	0
Seat change	▲1	▲1	▼1
Popular vote	6,545	1,933	3,777
Percentage	1.6%	0.5%	0.9%
Swing	▲0.3%	N/A	▼0.5%
- Winner of each seat at the 2021 Hampshire County Council election
Council control before election
Conservative
Council control after election
Conservative

Elections to Hampshire County Council took place on 6 May 2021 as part of the 2021 United Kingdom local elections. All 78 seats were up for election, with each ward returning either one or two councillors by first-past-the-post voting for a four-year term of office. This took place at the same time as the elections for the Hampshire Police and Crime Commissioner and district councils.

== Background ==
Whilst an election for the county council had already been planned, district council elections were delayed due to the ongoing COVID-19 pandemic, meaning that they are due to be held at the same time as the Hampshire County Council Elections. Whilst not part of Hampshire County Council, the unitary authorities of Portsmouth and Southampton are also due to hold council elections for a third of their respective councils at the same time.

After the previous election in 2017, the Conservatives held 56 seats, the Liberal Democrats 19, Labour 2, and Community Campaign Hart 1.

In July 2019, Cllr Floss Mitchell resigned from the Conservative Party to sit as an unaffiliated independent.

In December 2019, Cllr Michael Westbrook left the Labour Party alongside borough councillors to form the Basingstoke & Deane Independent Group sitting with Community Campaign Hart as an independent grouping on the County Council.

In December 2020, Conservative Cllr Keith Evans died from COVID-19.

As such, the Conservatives and Labour lost two councillors and a single councillor respectively, in the time since the previous election.

== Summary ==
=== Election result ===
2021 Hampshire County Council election
Party	Candidates	Seats	Gains	Losses	Net gain/loss	Seats %	Votes %	Votes	+/−
Conservative	78	56	3	3	Steady	71.8	50.7	206,538	–1.5
Liberal Democrats	78	17	1	3	▼2	21.8	26.8	109,212	–0.1
Labour	75	3	1	0	▲1	3.8	12.6	51,336	+2.0
Independent	10	1	1	0	▲1	1.3	1.6	6,545	+0.3
WBCP	1	1	1	0	▲1	1.3	0.5	1,933	N/A
Green	32	0	0	0	Steady	0.0	4.4	18,044	+1.2
Hampshire Independents	24	0	0	0	Steady	0.0	1.6	6,671	N/A
CCH	2	0	0	1	▼1	0.0	0.9	3,777	–0.5
Reform	11	0	0	0	Steady	0.0	0.3	1,350	N/A
UKIP	8	0	0	0	Steady	0.0	0.2	855	–3.9
Andover Independents	3	0	0	0	Steady	0.0	0.2	822	N/A
Alliance for Democracy and Freedom (UK)	1	0	0	0	Steady	0.0	0.1	261	N/A
TUSC	3	0	0	0	Steady	0.0	<0.1	199	±0.0
JAC	1	0	0	0	Steady	0.0	<0.1	63	–0.1

The Conservatives won 56 seats, the same number as in the previous election. Labour won 3 seats, an increase of 1. Community Campaign Hart, which had previously held 1 county council seat, failed to secure the two seats they ran in. An Independent candidate won in Bishopstoke & Fair Oak, and the Whitehill & Bordon Community Party won the seat they ran in of the same name.

== Results by electoral division ==
Hampshire County Council is divided into 11 districts, which are split further into electoral divisions, and then split into a number of wards. Councillors seeking re-election were elected in 2017, and are compared to that year's polls on that basis.

=== Basingstoke and Deane (10 seats) ===
Basingstoke and Deane district summary
Party	Seats	+/-	Votes	%	+/-
Conservative	7	Steady	24,459	49.8	–2.3
Labour	2	Steady	10,833	22.1	+0.5
Liberal Democrats	1	Steady	9,346	19.0	+0.6
Hampshire Ind.	0	Steady	4,281	8.7	N/A
TUSC	0	Steady	160	0.3	N/A
Total	10	Steady	49,079		

Division results

Basingstoke and Deane

Basingstoke Central
Party	Candidate	Votes	%	±%
Labour	Kim Taylor	1,868	39.11	−10
Conservative	Mike Patchett	1,752	36.68	+3
Liberal Democrats	Ryan Hickling	664	13.90	+3
Hampshire Ind.	Stan Tennison	492	10.30	N/A
Majority		116	2.43	
Turnout		4,776	33.1	
Labour hold		Swing		

Basingstoke North
Party	Candidate	Votes	%	±%
Labour	Jacky Tustain	1,518	43	−16
Conservative	Satya Sookhun	1,096	31	+5
Hampshire Ind.	Steve James-Bailey	514	15	N/A
Liberal Democrats	Michael Berwick-Gooding	320	9	+1
TUSC	Mayola Demmenie	83	2	N/A
Majority		422		
Turnout		3,531	26.3	
Labour hold		Swing		

Basingstoke North West
Party	Candidate	Votes	%	±%
Conservative	Arun Mummalaneni	1,882	45	0
Labour Co-op	Andrew McCormick	1,679	41	0
Liberal Democrats	Martin Baker	353	9	+1
Hampshire Ind.	David White	228	6	N/A
Majority		203		
Turnout		4,142	31.2	
Conservative hold		Swing		

Basingstoke South East
Party	Candidate	Votes	%	±%
Liberal Democrats	Gavin James	2,085	41	0
Conservative	Dan Putty	1,526	30	0
Labour	Kieran Kerswell	1,156	23	+2
Hampshire Ind.	Alan Stone	277	5	N/A
TUSC	Ben McDonnell	77	2	N/A
Majority		559		
Turnout		5,121	33	
Liberal Democrats hold		Swing		

Basingstoke South West
Party	Candidate	Votes	%	±%
Conservative	Stephen Reid	3,217	57	−6
Labour	David Bell	1,186	21	+4
Liberal Democrats	Andy Konieczko	756	13	0
Hampshire Ind.	Spencer Cleary	458	8	N/A
Majority		2,031		
Turnout		5,617	37	
Conservative hold		Swing		

Calleva
Party	Candidate	Votes	%	±%
Conservative	Rhydian Vaughan	3,007	64	−12
Labour	Tom Kingsley	605	13	−5
Liberal Democrats	Roger Ward	717	15	N/A
Hampshire Ind.	Robert Holliday	402	8	N/A
Majority		2,290		
Turnout		4,731	41	
Conservative hold		Swing		

Candovers, Oakley & Overton
Party	Candidate	Votes	%	±%
Conservative	Juliet Henderson	2,924	52	−3
Liberal Democrats	Paula Baker	1,491	27	+11
Labour	Julie Pierce	701	13	+6
Hampshire Ind.	Tim Douglas	481	9	N/A
Majority		1,433		
Turnout		5,597	45	
Conservative hold		Swing		

Loddon
Party	Candidate	Votes	%	±%
Conservative	Elaine Still	3,402	64	−7
Liberal Democrats	Francesca Maritan	776	15	+1
Labour	Michael Barham	761	14	+4
Hampshire Ind.	Phil Heath	354	7	N/A
Majority		2,626		
Turnout		5,293	37	
Conservative hold		Swing		

Tadley and Baughurst
Party	Candidate	Votes	%	±%
Conservative	Derek Mellor	2,339	52	+5
Liberal Democrats	Jo Slimin	1,420	31	−12
Labour	Matt Russell	539	12	+6
Hampshire Ind.	Margaret Bennett	218	5	N/A
Majority		919		
Turnout		4,516	36	
Conservative hold		Swing		

Whitchurch and Clere
Party	Candidate	Votes	%	±%
Conservative	Tom Thacker	3,314	58	−4
Hampshire Ind.	Lucy Dean	857	15	N/A
Labour	Andy Fitchet	820	14	+5
Liberal Democrats	Matthew Kaschula	764	13	−10
Majority		2,457		
Turnout		5,755	43	
Conservative hold		Swing		

=== East Hampshire (7 seats) ===
East Hampshire

East Hampshire district summary
Party	Seats	+/-	Votes	%	+/-
Conservative	6	▼1	18,386	50.9	–8.2
WBCP	1	▲1	1,933	5.4	N/A
Liberal Democrats	0	Steady	9,044	25.1	±0.0
Green	0	Steady	3,154	8.7	+4.3
Labour	0	Steady	2,941	8.1	+0.4
Hampshire Ind.	0	Steady	495	1.4	N/A
UKIP	0	Steady	99	0.3	–1.6
Reform UK	0	Steady	39	0.1	N/A
Total	7	Steady	36,091		

Division results

Alton Rural
Party	Candidate	Votes	%	±%
Conservative	Mark Kemp-Gee	3,688	63	−7
Liberal Democrats	Roland Richardson	1,144	20	+5
Green	Laurent Coffre	650	11	+5
Labour	Colin Brazier	355	6	0
Majority		2,544		
Turnout		5,837	43	
Conservative hold		Swing		

Alton Town
Party	Candidate	Votes	%	±%
Conservative	Andrew Joy	2,325	44	−4
Liberal Democrats	Steve Hunt	2,246	43	+4
Labour	Gary Boller	530	10	+4
Hampshire Ind.	Pete King	171	3	N/A
Majority		79		
Turnout		5,272	36	
Conservative hold		Swing		

Catherington
Party	Candidate	Votes	%	±%
Conservative	Marge Harvey	2,822	61	−11
Liberal Democrats	John Smart	1,038	22	+6
Green	Phillip Humphries	453	10	+6
Labour Co-op	Jeremy Abraham	328	7	0
Majority		1,784		
Turnout		4,641	36	
Conservative hold		Swing		

Liphook, Headley & Grayshott
Party	Candidate	Votes	%	±%
Conservative	Debbie Curnow-Ford	2,873	54	−9
Liberal Democrats	Alison Glasspool	1,331	25	−3
Labour	John Tough	500	9	+2
Green	John Hilton	393	7	N/A
Hampshire Ind.	Wendy Laidlaw	100	2	N/A
UKIP	Ted Wildey	99	2	N/A
Majority		1,542		
Turnout		5,296	39	
Conservative hold		Swing		

Petersfield Butser
Party	Candidate	Votes	%	±%
Conservative	Rob Mocatta	2,687	50	−3
Liberal Democrats	David Podger	1,496	28	+1
Green	Pippa Lee	712	13	+7
Labour	Steve Elder	520	10	+2
Majority		1,191		
Turnout		5,415	38	
Conservative hold		Swing		

Petersfield Hangers
Party	Candidate	Votes	%	±%
Conservative	Russell Oppenheimer	2,975	52	−7
Liberal Democrats	Louise Bevan	1,275	22	0
Green	Ian James	796	14	+8
Labour	Howard Linsley	489	8	0
Hampshire Ind.	Malcolm Bint	224	4	+1
Majority		1,700		
Turnout		5,759	43	
Conservative hold		Swing		

Whitehill, Bordon & Lindford
Party	Candidate	Votes	%	±%
WBCP	Andy Tree	1,933	50	N/A
Conservative	Phillip Davies	1,016	26	−31
Liberal Democrats	Neville Taylor	514	13	−1
Labour	Jack Winthrop	219	6	−3
Green	Jason Guy	150	4	N/A
Reform	Terry Hoar	39	1	N/A
Majority		917		
Turnout		3,871	31	
WBCP gain from Conservative		Swing		

=== Eastleigh (8 seats) ===
Eastleigh

Eastleigh district summary
Party	Seats	+/-	Votes	%	+/-
Liberal Democrats	6	▼1	17,101	43.4	–4.6
Conservative	1	Steady	14,900	37.8	+4.8
Independent	1	▲1	1,917	4.9	+1.9
Labour	0	Steady	4,594	11.7	+4.3
UKIP	0	Steady	401	1.0	–5.6
Hampshire Ind.	0	Steady	351	0.9	N/A
Reform UK	0	Steady	104	0.3	N/A
TUSC	0	Steady	39	0.1	N/A
Total	8	Steady	39,407		

Division results

Bishopstoke & Fair Oak
Party	Candidate	Votes	%	±%
Independent	Louise Parker-Jones	1,917	35	+13
Liberal Democrats	Mike Thornton	1,657	30	−9
Conservative	Ben Burcombe-Filer	1,394	25	+5
Labour	Jacob Phillips	379	7	0
UKIP	Martin Lyon	141	3	−6
TUSC	Robert Lovell	39	1	N/A
Majority		260		
Turnout		5,527	43	
Independent gain from Liberal Democrats		Swing		

Botley & Hedge End North
Party	Candidate	Votes	%	±%
Liberal Democrats	Rupert Kyrle	2,242	50	−4
Conservative	Susan Hall	1,766	40	+6
Labour	Kevin Williamson	459	10	+4
Majority		476		
Turnout		4,467	35	
Liberal Democrats hold		Swing		

Chandler’s Ford
Party	Candidate	Votes	%	±%
Liberal Democrats	Tim Groves	2,627	47	+9
Conservative	Judith Grajewski	2,584	46	−8
Labour	Gwyneth Hubert	413	7	+1
Majority		43		
Turnout		5,624	48	
Liberal Democrats gain from Conservative		Swing		

Eastleigh North
Party	Candidate	Votes	%	±%
Liberal Democrats	Tanya Park	1,629	38	−8
Conservative	Lisa Crosher	1,355	32	+10
Labour Co-op	Josh Constable	920	22	+10
Hampshire Ind.	John Edwards	150	4	N/A
Reform	Alexander Culley	104	2	N/A
UKIP	Chris Greenwood	98	2	−14
Majority		274		
Turnout		4,256	35	
Liberal Democrats hold		Swing		

Eastleigh South
Party	Candidate	Votes	%	±%
Liberal Democrats	Wayne Irish	2,161	41	−10
Conservative	Shelagh Lee	1,796	34	+6
Labour	Sam Jordan	980	19	+7
Hampshire Ind.	Andy Moore	201	4	N/A
UKIP	Jan Weller	74	1	−8
Majority		365		
Turnout		5,212		
Liberal Democrats hold		Swing		

Hamble
Party	Candidate	Votes	%	±%
Liberal Democrats	Keith House	2,915	54	−3
Conservative	Mike Preston	1,808	34	+3
Labour	Hayley Homer	665	12	+6
Majority		1,107		
Turnout		5,388	37	
Liberal Democrats hold		Swing		

Hedge End & West End South
Party	Candidate	Votes	%	±%
Liberal Democrats	Tonia Craig	2,206	46	−4
Conservative	Jerry Hall	2,189	46	+6
Labour	Steve Phillips	359	8	+2
Majority		17		
Turnout		4,754	39	
Liberal Democrats hold		Swing		

West End & Horton Heath
Party	Candidate	Votes	%	±%
Conservative	Steven Broomfield	2,008	48	+16
Liberal Democrats	Bruce Tennent	1,664	40	−12
Labour	Steve Willoughby	419	10	+4
UKIP	Hugh McGuinness	88	2	−4
Majority		344		
Turnout		4,179	39	
Conservative gain from Liberal Democrats		Swing		

=== Fareham (7 seats) ===
Fareham

Fareham district summary
Party	Seats	+/-	Votes	%	+/-
Conservative	6	Steady	23,629	55.2	–4.1
Liberal Democrats	1	Steady	9,164	21.4	–3.8
Labour	0	Steady	5,321	12.4	+3.2
Independent	0	Steady	2,460	5.7	N/A
Green	0	Steady	1,781	4.2	–0.4
Reform UK	0	Steady	238	0.6	N/A
Hampshire Ind.	0	Steady	203	0.5	N/A
Total	7	Steady	42,796		

Division results

Fareham Crofton
Party	Candidate	Votes	%	±%
Conservative	Pal Hayre	3,908	62	+13
Liberal Democrats	Jimmy Roberts	1,830	29	−8
Labour	Tom Fowler	567	9	+5
Majority		2,078		
Turnout		6,305	49	
Conservative hold		Swing		

Fareham Portchester
Party	Candidate	Votes	%	±%
Liberal Democrats	Roger Price	2,782	48.2	+1.0
Conservative	Susan Bell	2,368	41.1	−3.6
Labour	Richard Ryan	618	10.7	+2.7
Majority		414	7.1	+4.5
Turnout		5,768	40	
Liberal Democrats hold		Swing	+2.3	

Fareham Sarisbury
Party	Candidate	Votes	%	±%
Conservative	Seán Woodward	2,912	57	−13
Independent	Geoffrey Townley	676	13	New
Liberal Democrats	John Hughes	653	13	−1
Labour	James Webb	627	12	+4
Hampshire Ind.	Kim Rose	203	4	New
Majority		2,236		
Turnout		5,071	39	
Conservative hold		Swing		

Fareham Titchfield
Party	Candidate	Votes	%	±%
Conservative	Sarah Pankhurst	3,209	65	−8
Liberal Democrats	Dave Leonard	757	15	−1
Labour	Michael Prior	737	15	+4
Reform	Steve Richards	238	5	New
Majority				
Turnout				
Conservative hold		Swing		

Fareham Town (2 seats)
Party	Candidate	Votes	%	±%
Conservative	Pamela Bryant	4,096	55.1	
Conservative	Peter Latham	3,023	40.6	
Liberal Democrats	Ciaran Urry-Tuttiett	1,160	15.6	
Labour	Andrew Mooney	1,070	14.4	
Green	David Harrison	1,066	14.3	
Liberal Democrats	Paul Whittle	1,058	14.2	
Labour	Leslie Ricketts	906	12.2	
Independent	Keith Barton	902	12.1	
Independent	Geoffrey Fazackarley	882	11.9	
Green	Nick Lyle	715	9.6	
Turnout		8,406	37	
Conservative hold				
Conservative hold				

Fareham Warsash
Party	Candidate	Votes	%	±%
Conservative	Michael Ford	4,113	71	−3
Liberal Democrats	Jim Palmer	924	16	+7
Labour	Verden Meldrum	796	14	+7
Majority		3,189		
Turnout		5,833	43	
Conservative hold		Swing		

=== Gosport (5 seats) ===
Gosport

Gosport district summary
Party	Seats	+/-	Votes	%	+/-
Conservative	4	Steady	13,378	50.7	–5.3
Liberal Democrats	1	Steady	8,344	31.6	+8.8
Labour	0	Steady	3,650	13.8	+1.8
Independent	0	Steady	662	2.5	N/A
Reform UK	0	Steady	345	1.3	N/A
Total	5	Steady	26,379		

Division results

Bridgemary
Party	Candidate	Votes	%	±%
Conservative	Stephen Philipott	2,238	49	+2
Liberal Democrats	Steve Hammond	1,951	43	+14
Labour	Jonathan Brown	394	9	−6
Majority		287		
Turnout		4,583	34	
Conservative hold		Swing		

Hardway
Party	Candidate	Votes	%	±%
Liberal Democrats	Peter Chegwyn	1,742	46	−6
Conservative	Paddy Bergin	1,436	38	−1
Labour	Lynn Day	441	12	+3
Reform	Mark Staplehurst	140	4	New
Majority		306		
Turnout		3,786	30	
Liberal Democrats hold		Swing		

Lee
Party	Candidate	Votes	%	±%
Conservative	Graham Burgess	2,922	66	−5
Liberal Democrats	Kirsten Bradley	1,034	23	+15
Labour	Charis Noakes	477	11	+1
Majority		1,888		
Turnout		4,433	34	
Conservative hold		Swing		

Leesland and Town (2)
Party	Candidate	Votes	%	±%
Conservative	Zoe Huggins	3,765	44	−15
Conservative	Lesley Meenaghan	3,017	36	−18
Liberal Democrats	Rob Hylands	2,108	25	+6
Liberal Democrats	Julie Westerby	1,509	18	+3
Labour	Hilary Percival	1,178	14	+2
Labour	Keith Percival	1,160	14	+2
Independent	Dale Fletcher	380	4	New
Independent	Berkeley Vincent	282	3	New
Reform	Aaron Pinder	205	2	New
Turnout		8,471	59	
Conservative hold		Swing		

=== Hart (5 seats) ===
Hart

Hart district summary
Party	Seats	+/-	Votes	%	+/-
Conservative	4	▲2	15,234	49.7	+6.2
Liberal Democrats	1	▼1	8,859	28.9	+4.3
CCH	0	▼1	3,777	12.3	–7.0
Labour	0	Steady	1,880	6.1	–0.1
Hampshire Ind.	0	Steady	829	2.7	N/A
Reform UK	0	Steady	102	0.3	N/A
Total	5	Steady	30,681		

Division results

Church Crookham & Ewshot
Party	Candidate	Votes	%	±%
Conservative	Stephen Parker	2,676	43	+11
CCH	John Bennison	2,391	39	−16
Liberal Democrats	Christine Oldfield	739	12	N/A
Labour	Andrew Perkins	384	6	0
Majority		285		
Turnout		6,190	42	
Conservative gain from CCH		Swing		

Fleet Town
Party	Candidate	Votes	%	±%
Conservative	Steve Forster	3,571	54	+6
CCH	Alan Oliver	1,386	21	−18
Liberal Democrats	Peter Wildsmith	1,063	16	N/A
Labour	Mike Mellor	452	7	−2
Reform	Roy Fang	102	2	N/A
Majority		2,185		
Turnout		6,574	44	
Conservative hold		Swing		

Hartley Wintney & Yateley West
Party	Candidate	Votes	%	±%
Conservative	Tim Davies	3,438	52	+10
Liberal Democrats	Richard Quarterman	2,498	38	−9
Labour	Joyce Still	483	7	+3
Hampshire Ind.	Neil Fellman	193	3	N/A
Majority		940		
Turnout		6,612	43	
Conservative gain from Liberal Democrats		Swing		

Odiham & Hook
Party	Candidate	Votes	%	±%
Conservative	Jonathan Glen	3,444	62	−7
Liberal Democrats	Tony Over	1,244	23	+11
Labour Co-op	Barry Jones	561	10	+1
Hampshire Ind.	Dave Watson	266	5	N/A
Majority		2,200		
Turnout		5,515	41	
Conservative hold		Swing		

Yateley East and Blackwater
Party	Candidate	Votes	%	±%
Liberal Democrats	Adrian Collett	3,315	57	−3
Conservative	John Burton	2,105	36	+6
Hampshire Ind.	Caroline Mussared	370	6	N/A
Majority		1,210		
Turnout		5,790	38	
Liberal Democrats hold		Swing		

=== Havant (7 seats) ===
Havant

Havant district summary
Party	Seats	+/-	Votes	%	+/-
Conservative	7	Steady	18,029	60.8	+0.3
Labour	0	Steady	5,021	16.9	+4.0
Liberal Democrats	0	Steady	3,899	13.2	–0.4
Green	0	Steady	2,398	8.1	+2.9
Hampshire Ind.	0	Steady	283	1.0	N/A
Total	7	Steady	29,630		

Division results

Cowplain and Hart Plain
Party	Candidate	Votes	%	±%
Conservative	Prad Bains	2,484	67	−3
Labour	Susan Arnold	539	15	+4
Liberal Democrats	Lisa Jackson	284	8	−2
Green	Quentin Wallace-Jones	380	10	+6
Majority		1,945		
Turnout		3,687	30	
Conservative hold		Swing		

Emsworth and St. Faiths
Party	Candidate	Votes	%	±%
Conservative	Lulu Bowerman	3,220	53	−6
Labour	Peter Oliver	1,315	22	+11
Green	Shelley Saunders	784	13	+4
Liberal Democrats	Jane Briggs	765	13	−2
Majority		1,905		
Turnout		6,084	44	
Conservative hold		Swing		

Hayling Island
Party	Candidate	Votes	%	±%
Conservative	Lance Quantrill	3,155	60	0
Liberal Democrats	Paul Gray	782	15	+5
Labour	Sheree Earnshaw	696	13	+2
Green	Robert Soar	668	13	+8
Majority		2,373		
Turnout		5,301	37	
Conservative hold		Swing		

North East Havant
Party	Candidate	Votes	%	±%
Conservative	Jackie Branson	1,682	56	+12
Labour	Lynn Tolmon	700	23	+1
Liberal Democrats	Annie Martin	325	11	−8
Hampshire Ind.	Malc Carpenter	283	9	−3
Majority				
Turnout				
Conservative hold		Swing		

North West Havant
Party	Candidate	Votes	%	±%
Conservative	Liz Fairhurst	2,158	56	+2
Liberal Democrats	Phillipa Gray	878	23	−2
Labour	Anthony Berry	535	14	+3
Green	Rosie Blackburn	258	7	+4
Majority		1,280		
Turnout		3,829	26	
Conservative hold		Swing		

Purbrook & Stakes South
Party	Candidate	Votes	%	±%
Conservative	Gary Hughes	2,379	66	+3
Labour	Munazza Faiz	582	16	+1
Liberal Democrats	Paul Tansom	351	10	+2
Green	Patrick Bealy	308	9	+4
Majority		1,797		
Turnout		3,620	28	
Conservative hold		Swing		

Waterloo & Stakes North
Party	Candidate	Votes	%	±%
Conservative	Ann Briggs	2,951	72	0
Labour	Ashley Cowan	654	16	+3
Liberal Democrats	Izzy Fletcher	514	12	+2
Majority		2,297		
Turnout		4,119	32	
Conservative hold		Swing		

=== New Forest (10 seats) ===
New Forest

New Forest district summary
Party	Seats	+/-	Votes	%	+/-
Conservative	8	Steady	27,750	55.0	–3.3
Liberal Democrats	2	Steady	11,440	22.7	–2.6
Green	0	Steady	5,143	10.2	+7.3
Labour	0	Steady	4,574	9.1	+1.7
Independent	0	Steady	1,157	2.3	–1.5
ADF	0	Steady	261	0.5	N/A
UKIP	0	Steady	117	0.2	–1.7
Total	10	Steady	50,442		

Division results

Brockenhurst
Party	Candidate	Votes	%	±%
Conservative	Keith Mans	3,329	58	▼4
Liberal Democrats	Ruth Rollin	989	17	▼6
Green	Katherine Wilcox	931	16	▲11
Labour	Martin Ashman	466	8	▲3
Majority		2,340	41	▲2
Turnout		5,715	39	
Conservative hold		Swing		

Dibden and Hythe
Party	Candidate	Votes	%	±%
Liberal Democrats	Malcolm Wade	2,515	46	Steady
Conservative	Chris Harrison	2,088	38	Steady
Labour	Katherine Herbert	281	5	▼1
Green	Dominic Boddington	280	5	New
ADF	Tom Jones	261	5	New
Majority		427	8	Steady
Turnout		5,425	38	▼2
Liberal Democrats hold		Swing		

Lymington & Boldre
Party	Candidate	Votes	%	±%
Conservative	Barry Dunning	2,313	42	▼9
Liberal Democrats	Jack Davies	1,241	23	▲7
Independent	Jacqui England	1,157	21	▼4
Green	Verena Jolly	453	8	▲5
Labour	Jerry Weber	332	6	▲1
Majority		1,072	19	▼7
Turnout		5,496	38	▲1
Conservative hold		Swing		

Lyndhurst & Fordingbridge
Party	Candidate	Votes	%	±%
Conservative	Edward Heron	3,027	55	▼9
Liberal Democrats	Hilary Brand	1,063	19	▼2
Green	Janet Richards	928	17	▲9
Labour	James Swyer	443	8	▲2
Majority		1,964	36	▼7
Turnout		5,461	37	▼1
Conservative hold		Swing		

New Milton
Party	Candidate	Votes	%	±%
Conservative	Melville Kendal	3,504	66	Steady
Green	Jeremy Fenner	618	12	New
Liberal Democrats	Ben Thompson	593	11	▲1
Labour	Eloise Cleeter	582	11	▲2
Majority		2,886	54	▲1
Turnout		5,347	38	▲3
Conservative hold		Swing		

New Milton North, Milford & Hordle
Party	Candidate	Votes	%	±%
Conservative	Fran Carpenter	4,119	69	▼8
Labour	Chris Main	556	10	▲1
Green	Tony Law	539	9	New
Liberal Democrats	Mark Clark	537	9	▼7
UKIP	Ian Linney	117	3	New
Majority		3,553	59	▼3
Turnout		5,938	39	▲3
Conservative hold		Swing		

Ringwood
Party	Candidate	Votes	%	±%
Conservative	Michael Thierry	2,439	57	▼4
Labour	Peter Kelleher	772	18	▲5
Green	Nicola Jolly	645	15	▲7
Liberal Democrats	Alex Brunsdon	410	10	▼8
Majority		1667	19	
Turnout			32	
Conservative hold		Swing		

South Waterside
Party	Candidate	Votes	%	±%
Conservative	Alexis McEvoy	2,218	59	▼7
Liberal Democrats	Rebecca Clark	884	24	▲5
Labour	Julie Hope	420	11	▲1
Green	John Pemberton	215	6	▲1
Majority		1334	35	
Turnout			30	
Conservative hold		Swing		

Totton North and Netley Marsh
Party	Candidate	Votes	%	±%
Conservative	Neville Penman	2,821	63	Steady
Liberal Democrats	Caroline Rackham	905	20	▼5
Labour	John Rochey-Adams	410	9	▼3
Green	Timothy Rowe	315	7	New
Majority		1916	43	
Turnout			31	
Conservative hold		Swing		

Totton South and Marchwood
Party	Candidate	Votes	%	±%
Liberal Democrats	David Harrison	2,303	48	▼9
Conservative	Richard Young	1892	40	▲4
Labour	Helen Field	312	7	Steady
Green	Callum O'Driscoll	219	6	New
Majority		411	8	
Turnout			34	
Liberal Democrats hold		Swing		

=== Rushmoor (5 seats) ===
Rushmoor

Rushmoor district summary
Party	Seats	+/-	Votes	%	+/-
Conservative	4	▼1	11,651	50.3	+4.8
Labour	1	▲1	7,240	31.3	+6.8
Liberal Democrats	0	Steady	3,909	16.9	+6.0
Independent	0	Steady	202	0.9	–1.2
UKIP	0	Steady	94	0.4	–13.2
Reform UK	0	Steady	64	0.3	N/A
Total	5	Steady	23,160		

Division results

Aldershot North
Party	Candidate	Votes	%	±%
Labour	Alex Crawford	1,684	44	+8
Conservative	Charles Choudhary	1,629	42	−2
Liberal Democrats	Alan Hilliar	549	14	+6
Majority		55		
Turnout		3,862	33.6	
Labour gain from Conservative		Swing		

Aldershot South
Party	Candidate	Votes	%	±%
Conservative	Bill Withers	2,128	47	+5
Labour Co-op	Gaynor Austin	2,059	45	+3
Liberal Democrats	Mark Trotter	356	8	+3
Majority		69		
Turnout		4,543	35	
Conservative hold		Swing		

Farnborough North
Party	Candidate	Votes	%	±%
Conservative	Roz Chadd	2,385	54	+8
Labour	Clive Grattan	1,452	33	+6
Liberal Democrats	Charlie Fraser-Fleming	581	13	+3
Majority		933		
Turnout		4,418	33.4	
Conservative hold		Swing		

Farnborough South
Party	Candidate	Votes	%	±%
Conservative	Adam Jackman	2,607	47	0
Liberal Democrats	Thomas Mitchell	1,613	29	+10
Labour	June Smith	940	17	+5
Independent	Donna Wallace	202	4	−3
UKIP	Zack Culshaw	94	2	−3
Reform	Benjamin Seary	64	1	New
Majority		994		

Farnborough West
Party	Candidate	Votes	%	±%
Conservative	Rod Cooper	2,902	60	+13
Labour	Madi Jabbi	1,105	23	+10
Liberal Democrats	Craig Card	810	17	+7
Majority		1,797		
Turnout			36.1	
Conservative hold		Swing		

=== Test Valley (7 seats) ===
Test Valley

Test Valley district summary
Party	Seats	+/-	Votes	%	+/-
Conservative	5	Steady	19,145	52.0	–0.5
Liberal Democrats	2	Steady	11,853	32.2	–1.3
Labour	0	Steady	3,327	9.0	+1.6
Green	0	Steady	834	2.3	+0.5
Andover Ind.	0	Steady	822	2.2	N/A
Reform UK	0	Steady	369	1.0	N/A
Hampshire Ind.	0	Steady	175	0.5	N/A
Independent	0	Steady	147	0.4	–0.5
UKIP	0	Steady	144	0.4	–3.3
Total	7	Steady	36,816		

Division results

Andover North
Party	Candidate	Votes	%	±%
Conservative	Kirsty North	2,070	57	+1
Labour	David Bass	607	17	N/A
Liberal Democrats	Barbara Carpenter	577	16	−13
Andover Ind.	Rebecca Meyer	281	8	N/A
Hampshire Ind.	Scott Neville	81	2	N/A
Majority		1,463		
Turnout		3,616	26	
Conservative hold		Swing		

Andover South
Party	Candidate	Votes	%	±%
Conservative	Phil North	2,818	58	+6
Liberal Democrats	Robin Hughes	710	15	−3
Labour	Geoffrey McBride	494	10	−1
Green	Lance Mitchell	369	8	+3
Andover Ind.	Susana Ecclestone	316	7	N/A
Reform	Peter Griffiths	84	2	N/A
Hampshire Ind.	Christine Heath	48	1	
Majority		2,108		
Turnout		4,839	34	
Conservative hold		Swing		

Andover West
Party	Candidate	Votes	%	±%
Conservative	Chris Donnelly	2,710	57	+1
Liberal Democrats	Luigi Gregori	1,079	23	+3
Labour	Judith Cole	596	12	−3
Andover Ind.	David Coole	225	5	N/A
UKIP	Norman Woods	144	2	−8
Hampshire Ind.	Seem Alsala	46	1	N/A
Majority		1,631		
Turnout		4,770	33	
Conservative hold		Swing		

Baddesley
Party	Candidate	Votes	%	±%
Liberal Democrats	Alan Dowden	3,303	61	+2
Conservative	Alan Higginson	1,613	30	−5
Labour	David Stevens	357	7	+1
Reform	Clare Fawcett	129	2	N/A
Majority		1,690		
Turnout		5,402	41	
Liberal Democrats hold		Swing		

Romsey Rural
Party	Candidate	Votes	%	±%
Conservative	Nick Adams-King	4,251	67	+1
Liberal Democrats	Andrew Beesley	1,585	25	−1
Labour	Jane Elliott	496	8	+1
Majority		2,666		
Turnout		6,332	43	
Conservative hold		Swing		

Romsey Town
Party	Candidate	Votes	%	±%
Liberal Democrats	Mark Cooper	3,156	53	−3
Conservative	Tim Mayer	2,205	37	0
Labour	Stuart Bannerman	455	8	+2
Reform	Andrew Peterson	156	3	N/A
Majority		951		
Turnout		5,972	45	
Liberal Democrats hold		Swing		

Test Valley Central
Party	Candidate	Votes	%	±%
Conservative	David Drew	3,478	59	−9
Liberal Democrats	David Hall	1,443	25	+5
Green	Jonathan Cotterell	465	8	+1
Labour	Michael Mumford	322	5	0
Independent	Connor Shaw	147	3	N/A
Majority		2,035		
Turnout		5,855	41	
Conservative hold		Swing		

=== Winchester (7 seats) ===
Winchester

Winchester district summary
Party	Seats	+/-	Votes	%	+/-
Conservative	4	Steady	19,977	46.0	–3.9
Liberal Democrats	3	Steady	16,252	37.5	–1.4
Green	0	Steady	4,734	10.9	+6.0
Labour	0	Steady	1,905	4.4	–1.3
Independent	0	Steady	319	0.7	N/A
Reform UK	0	Steady	89	0.2	N/A
JAC	0	Steady	63	0.1	±0.0
Hampshire Ind.	0	Steady	54	0.1	N/A
Total	7	Steady	43,393		

Division results

Bishops Waltham
Party	Candidate	Votes	%	±%
Conservative	Rob Humby	3,474	57	−6
Liberal Democrats	Christopher Day	1,442	24	+1
Green	Richard Cannon	809	13	+6
Labour	Steve Haines	384	6	−1
Majority		2,032		
Turnout		6,109	45	
Conservative hold		Swing		

Itchen Valley
Party	Candidate	Votes	%	±%
Liberal Democrats	Jackie Porter	3,673	52	−3
Conservative	Caroline Horrill	2,836	40	0
Green	Alex Blower	348	5	+2
Labour	Kimberly Torkington	164	2	0
Reform	Dave Brockless	89	1	N/A
Majority		837		
Turnout		7,110	53	
Liberal Democrats hold		Swing		

Meon Valley
Party	Candidate	Votes	%	±%
Conservative	Hugh Lumby	2,929	52	−6
Green	Malcolm Wallace	1,312	23	+19
Liberal Democrats	Jonathan Fern	1,146	20	−10
Labour	Daniel Reid	263	5	+1
Majority		1,617		
Turnout		5,650	44	
Conservative hold		Swing		

Winchester Downlands
Party	Candidate	Votes	%	±%
Conservative	Jan Warwick	4,217	54	+5
Liberal Democrats	James Batho	2,740	35	−8
Green	Max Priesemann	531	7	+3
Labour	Jude Wilkinson	296	4	0
Majority		1,477		
Turnout		7,784	53	
Conservative hold		Swing		

Winchester Eastgate
Party	Candidate	Votes	%	±%
Liberal Democrats	Dominic Hiscock	2,796	48	+4
Conservative	Fiona Mather	1,866	32	−5
Green	Sarah Gooding	551	10	+3
Labour	Patrick Davies	449	8	−3
JAC	Teresa Skelton	63	1	0
Hampshire Ind.	Duncan Stone	54	1	N/A
Majority		930		
Turnout		5,779	44	
Liberal Democrats hold		Swing		

Winchester Southern Parishes
Party	Candidate	Votes	%	±%
Conservative	Patricia Stallard	2,870	59	−12
Liberal Democrats	Jude Godwin	1,425	29	+10
Green	Robert Parker	553	11	+6
Majority		1,445		
Turnout		4,848	38	
Conservative hold		Swing		

Winchester Westgate
Party	Candidate	Votes	%	±%
Liberal Democrats	Martin Tod	3,030	50	−2
Conservative	Rebecca Butler	1,785	29	−8
Green	Giles Gooding	630	10	+6
Labour	Peter Rees	349	6	+2
Independent	Ian Tait	319	5	−32
Majority		1,245		
Turnout		6,113	49	
Liberal Democrats hold		Swing		

== Changes 2021–2025 ==
Purbrook and Stakes South by-election, 4 May 2023
Party	Candidate	Votes	%	±%
Conservative	Ryan Brent	1,484	47.1	−18.6
Liberal Democrats	Adrian Tansom	866	27.5	+17.8
Labour	Munazza Faiz	802	25.4	+9.3
Majority		618	19.6	
Turnout		3,152		
Conservative hold		Swing		

Fareham Sarisbury by-election, 2 May 2024
Party	Candidate	Votes	%	±%
Conservative	Joanne Burton	2,096	46.7	−10.7
Liberal Democrats	Graham Stanley Everdell	1,542	34.4	+21.5
Labour	Verden Alluin Meldrum	592	13.2	+0.8
Independent	Nick Gregory	256	5.7	−7.6
Majority		554	12.3	
Turnout		4,541	34.5	
Conservative hold		Swing	-16.1	

By-election triggered by resignation of Conservative councillor Seán Woodward.

Meon Valley by-election, 2 May 2024
Party	Candidate	Votes	%	±%
Green	Malcolm Wallace	2,083	35.8	+12.6
Liberal Democrats	Vivian Achwal	1,906	32.7	+12.5
Conservative	Neil Bolton	1,630	28.0	−23.8
Labour	Oliver Hirsch	199	3.4	−1.6
Majority		177	3.0	
Turnout		5,818	39.38	
Green gain from Conservative				

By-election triggered by resignation of Conservative councillor Hugh Lumby.

Bishops Waltham by-election, 31 October 2024
Party	Candidate	Votes	%	±%
Liberal Democrats	Jonathan Williams	2,210	52.2	+28.6
Conservative	Neil Bolton	1,431	33.8	−23.1
Green	Alex Ellis	477	11.3	−2.0
Labour	Steve Haines	115	2.7	−3.6
Majority		779	18.4	
Turnout		4,244	28.9	
Registered electors		14,696		+7.3
Liberal Democrats gain from Conservative		Swing	+25.8	

By-election triggered by resignation of Conservative councillor and former leader of Hampshire County Council, Rob Humby.

Winchester Eastgate by-election, 1 May 2025
Party	Candidate	Votes	%	±%
Liberal Democrats	Paula Ferguson	2,027	44.3	−4.0
Green	Lorraine Estelle	1,033	22.6	+5.3
Conservative	Ian Tait	786	17.2	−8.8
Reform	Russ Kitching	577	12.6	+12.6
Labour	Peter Marsh	152	3.3	−5.1
Majority		994	21.7	+5.6
Turnout		4,575	34.3	
Registered electors		13,318		+0.3
Liberal Democrats hold		Swing	-4.6	

By-election triggered by retirement of Liberal Democrat Councillor Dominic Hiscock.

Yateley East & Blackwater by-election, 1 May 2025
Party	Candidate	Votes	%	±%
Liberal Democrats	Stuart Bailey	2,410	49.0	−8.3
Reform	Trevor Lloyd-Jones	1,380	28.0	+28.0
Conservative	Sue Perkins	708	14.4	−22.0
Green	Samantha Davis	204	4.1	+4.1
Labour	Robbie Wiltshire	203	4.1	+4.1
Libertarian	Alex Zychowski	16	0.3	+0.3
Majority		1,030	20.9	
Turnout		4,921	31.3	
Registered electors		15,730		+1.5
Liberal Democrats hold		Swing	-18.2	

By-election triggered by retirement of Liberal Democrat Councillor Adrian Collett.

== See also ==
- 2021 Basingstoke and Deane Borough Council Election
- 2021 Eastleigh Borough Council Election
- 2021 Fareham Borough Council Election
- 2021 Gosport Borough Council Election
- 2021 Hart District Council Election
- 2021 Havant Borough Council Election
- 2021 Rushmoor Borough Council Election
- 2021 Winchester City Council Election
