= All In =

All In may refer to:

== Books ==
- All In: The Education of General David Petraeus, a 2012 biography by Paula Broadwell
- All In (Levs book), a 2015 book on parenting and work culture by Josh Levs
- All In: An E-Guide to No Limit Texas Hold'em, a 2003 book by Amarillo Slim and Brent Riley

== Film and television ==
=== Films ===
- All In (film), a 1936 British sports comedy
- All In: The Fight for Democracy, a 2020 American documentary

=== Television episodes ===
- "All In" (Amphibia)
- "All In" (Boardwalk Empire)
- "All In" (CSI)
- "All In" (CSI: Miami)
- "All In" (Homeland)
- "All In" (House)
- "All In" (Law & Order: Criminal Intent)
- "All In" (Major Crimes)
- "All In" (Ozark)
- "All In" (Person of Interest)
- "All In" (The Shield)
- "All In" (Suits)
- "All In" (White Collar)

=== Television series ===
- All In (TV series), a 2003 South Korean drama
- All In with Chris Hayes, a news and opinion television program
- All In with Laila Ali, an educational program on CBS Dream Team

== Music ==
=== Albums ===
- All In (Stellar Kart album), 2013
- All In (Stan Walker album) or its first track, 2022
- All In (EP), by Stray Kids, 2020
- All-In, by Arling & Cameron, 1999
- All In, by Stroke 9, 2004
- All In, by Matthew West, 2017
- All In, by Down by Law, 2018
- All In, by Skepta, 2021
- All In, by Amber Pacific, 2025

=== Live ===
- All In (concert residency), a 2017–2018 Las Vegas show by Ricky Martin

=== Songs ===
- "All In" (Lifehouse song), 2010
- "All In" (Lil Baby song), 2020
- "All In" (YoungBoy Never Broke Again song), 2020
- "All In", by DKB, 2021
- "All In", by Kid Cudi from Passion, Pain & Demon Slayin', 2016
- "All-In", by Sonic Boom Six from The Ruff Guide to Genre-Terrorism, 2006
- "All In", by Monsta X from The Clan Pt. 1 Lost, 2016
- "All In", by Stray Kids form the EP of the same name, 2020

== Sports ==
- All-in professional wrestling, a 1930s British style of professional wrestling
- All In (professional wrestling), an annual professional wrestling pay-per-view event promoted by All Elite Wrestling
  - All In (2018)
  - All In (2023)
  - All In (2024)
  - All In (2025)
  - All In (2026)
- A motto used by the Clemson Tigers
- A motto used by the Cleveland Cavaliers during their 2016 championship playoff run

== Other ==
- All in (poker), wagering one's entire stake
- All In (magazine), print and online magazine about poker and other wagering
- All-In (podcast), a business and technology podcast
- All In: Comedy About Love, a Broadway show of Simon Rich's magazine pieces

== See also ==
- All or Nothing (disambiguation)
- Allin
