= No overall control =

Possible result of a UK local election

In the context of local authorities in the United Kingdom, no overall control (NOC; Welsh: dim rheolaeth gyffredinol) is a situation in which no single political group achieves a majority of seats, comparable to a hung parliament. Of the 248 councils who had members up for election in the 2019 local elections, 73 (over a quarter) resulted in a NOC administration. In the 2021 local elections, 14 resulted in no overall control. Outside of the UK, the term may be applied to other local authorities, such as the local councils of Malta and the General Assembly of Budapest in Hungary.

== Administration ==
Typically, if no party achieves overall control of a council, the largest grouping will form alliances to create an ad hoc governing coalition. Often local authorities have larger proportions of smaller party and independent members than the House of Commons, and when there is no overall control this often results in minor groups having more influence than their numbers alone would suggest.

In a result of no overall control, the largest party may attempt to govern as a minority administration. Parties may also work together to create a formal deal, which can range from a confidence and supply deal (Note: Confidence votes in local governments do not cause early elections.) to full coalition. Deals, especially the looser kind, can occur between parties which are not traditionally aligned on a national level. For example, a minority Conservative administration was formed in 2019 in Bolton supported by the Liberal Democrats and UKIP, whilst a Labour-UKIP formal coalition existed in Basildon. Following the 2017 Aberdeen City Council election, all nine Labour councillors were expelled from the party for entering into a coalition with the Conservatives.

It is possible for a council to be under no overall control even when there appears to be an overall majority, in particular in the case of a majority of independents, who commonly have no collective policies when elected. This can also arise when the council members divide on other than party lines. For instance, the 2004 elections to the Isle of Anglesey County Council returned more independents than all others put together, but only Plaid Cymru maintained a party group within the council, and not all of its elected members joined the group. The remainder of the council, including some members of other political parties, formed four non-partisan groups, none of which held a majority. The 2008 elections resulted in a group called the Original Independents gaining an overall majority.

No overall control is more common in Northern Ireland and Scotland, in part due to their usage of single transferable vote as opposed to the plurality block voting system used in England and Wales. Following the 2022 Scottish local elections, twenty-seven of the thirty-two councils were under no overall control, with a further three having a majority of independents. Following the 2023 Northern Ireland local elections, all eleven councils were under no overall control.

== Local authorities ==
=== County councils ===
Council	Seats	Largest party	Seats	Control	Seats
Devon	60	Liberal Democrats	27	Liberal Democrats/Green coalition	33
East Sussex	50	Conservative	22	Conservative minority	22
Gloucestershire	55	Liberal Democrats	27	Liberal Democrats minority	27
Hertfordshire	78	Liberal Democrats	32	Liberal Democrats minority	32
Leicestershire	55	Reform	25	Reform UK minority	25
Surrey	81	Conservative	39	Conservative minority	39
Warwickshire	57	Reform	22	Reform UK minority	22
Worcestershire	57	Reform	26	Reform UK minority	26

=== Metropolitan boroughs ===
Council	Seats	Largest party	Seats	Control	Seats
Bolton	60	Labour	25	Labour minority	25
Dudley	72	Conservative	33	Conservative minority	33
Kirklees	69	Labour	23	Labour minority	23
Newcastle upon Tyne	78	Labour	37	Labour minority	37
Oldham	60	Labour	27	Labour minority	27
Sheffield	84	Labour	35	Labour/Liberal Democrats/Green coalition	76
South Tyneside	54	Labour	27	Labour minority	27
Stockport	63	Liberal Democrats	30	Liberal Democrats minority	30
Wirral	66	Labour	27	Labour minority	27

=== Unitary authorities ===
Council	Seats	Largest party	Seats	Control	Seats
Bedford	46	Conservative	14 + mayor	Conservative mayor	14 + mayor
Bournemouth, Christchurch and Poole	76	Liberal Democrats	29	Liberal Democrats/Christchurch Independents/Poole People/Independent coalition	47
Bracknell Forest	41	Labour	20	Labour minority	20
Bristol	70	Green	35	Green/Liberal Democrats coalition	43
Buckinghamshire	97	Conservative	48	Conservative minority	48
Central Bedfordshire	63	Independent	28	Independent minority	28
Cheshire East	82	Conservative	34	Labour/Independent coalition	45
Cheshire West and Chester	70	Labour	35	Labour minority	35
Cornwall	87	Liberal Democrats	26	Liberal Democrats/Independent coalition	42
Darlington	50	Labour	23	Labour/Liberal Democrats coalition	25
Derby	51	Labour	24	Labour minority	24
East Riding of Yorkshire	67	Conservative	25	Conservative minority	25
Herefordshire	53	Conservative	20	Conservative minority	20
Isle of Wight	39	Conservative	13	Independent/Green/Our Island coalition	12
North East Lincolnshire	42	Conservative	18	Conservative minority	18
North Somerset	50	Conservative	15 (Note: Includes 2 independents who sit with the Conservative Party and Independents Group on the council.)	Liberal Democrats/Labour/Green/Portishead Independents/Independent coalition	35
North Yorkshire	90	Conservative	43	Conservative minority	43
Northumberland	69	Conservative	27	Conservative minority	27
Peterborough	60	Labour	15	Labour minority	15
Portsmouth	42	Liberal Democrats	18	Liberal Democrats minority	18
Redcar and Cleveland	59	Labour	19	Labour minority	19
Rutland	27	Liberal Democrats	11	Liberal Democrats/Green coalition	12
Slough	42	Conservative	20	Conservative/Liberal Democrats coalition	30
South Gloucestershire	61	Conservative	23	Liberal Democrats/Labour Party coalition	34
Southend-on-Sea	51	Labour	19	Labour/Liberal Democrats/Independent coalition	28
Stockton-on-Tees	56	Conservative	25	Labour minority	22
Torbay	36	Conservative	17	Conservative minority	17
Wiltshire	98	Liberal Democrats	43	Liberal Democrats/Independent coalition	50

=== London boroughs ===
Council	Seats	Largest party	Seats	Control	Seats
Croydon	71	Labour	34	Conservative mayor	33
Havering	55	Havering Residents Association	25	Havering Residents Association/Labour coalition	33
Tower Hamlets	45	Aspire	21 + mayor	Aspire mayor	21 + mayor

=== Welsh principal areas ===
Council	Seats	Largest party	Seats	Control	Seats
Carmarthenshire	75	Plaid Cymru	37	Plaid Cymru minority	37
Conwy	55	Independent	23	Independent/Labour/Plaid Cymru coalition (Note: Conwy's sole Green councillor is in a group with Plaid Cymru.)	39
Denbighshire	48	Labour	15	Labour/Plaid Cymru coalition	23
Flintshire	67	Labour	28	Labour minority	28
Merthyr Tydfil	30	Independent	14	Independent minority	14
Monmouthshire	46	Labour	21	Labour minority	21
Neath Port Talbot	60	Labour	27	Independent/Plaid Cymru coalition (Note: Liberal Democrats and Green confidence and supply.)	29
Pembrokeshire	60	Independent	36	Independent/Labour/Liberal Democrats coalition	29
Powys	68	Liberal Democrats	22	Liberal Democrats/Labour coalition	31
Vale of Glamorgan	54	Labour	24	Labour/Llantwit First Independents/Independent coalition	29
Wrexham	56	Independent	27	Independent/Conservative coalition	30

=== District councils ===
Council	Seats	Largest party	Seats	Control	Seats
Arun	54	Conservative	19	Liberal Democrats/Labour/Green coalition	28
Ashford	47	Conservative	17	Conservative minority	17
Babergh	32	Green	10	Green/Liberal Democrats/Independent coalition	24
Basildon	42	Labour	19	Labour minority	19
Basingstoke and Deane	54	Conservative	15	B&D Independents/Liberal Democrats/Green/Independent coalition (Note: The Basingstoke & Deane Independents, Green Party, and the independents sit as the Independent Forum group.)	28
Brentwood	39	Conservative	19	Liberal Democrats/Labour coalition	20
Broadland	47	Conservative	22	Liberal Democrats/Labour/Green coalition	25
Bromsgrove	31	Conservative	11	Conservative/Independent coalition	18
Broxtowe	44	Broxtowe Alliance	18	Broxtowe Independents minority	18
Burnley	45	Labour	15	Independent/Liberal Democrats/Green coalition (Note: The independents sit as the Burnley Independents group.)	22
Canterbury	39	Labour	18	Labour/Liberal Democrats coalition	27
Charnwood	52	Conservative	23	Labour minority (Note: Supported by the Green Party.)	20
Cherwell	48	Liberal Democrats	17	Liberal Democrats/Green coalition	21
Colchester	51	Conservative	19	Liberal Democrats minority (Note: Supported by Labour and the Green Party.)	14
Derbyshire Dales	34	Liberal Democrats	12	Liberal Democrats/Labour/Green coalition	23
Dover	32	Labour	16	Labour minority	16
East Devon	60	Liberal Democrats	18	Liberal Democrats/Green/Independent coalition	31
East Hampshire	43	Conservative	19	Conservative/Whitehill and Bordon Community Party coalition	25
East Hertfordshire	50	Green	17	Green/Liberal Democrats coalition	27
East Lindsey	55	Conservative	25	Conservative minority	25
East Suffolk	55	Green	16	Green/Liberal Democrats/Independent coalition	28
Elmbridge	48	Liberal Democrats	21	Liberal Democrats/Residents Association coalition	35
Folkestone and Hythe	30	Green	11	Green/Liberal Democrats coalition	13
Forest of Dean	38	Green	15	Green minority	15
Gloucester	39	Liberal Democrats	17	Liberal Democrats minority	17
Great Yarmouth	39	Conservative	19	Conservative minority	19
Harborough District Council	34	Conservative	15	Liberal Democrats/Labour/Green coalition	19
Hart	33	Liberal Democrats	12	Liberal Democrats/Community Campaign (Hart) coalition	23
Hastings	32	Green	12	Green/Independent coalition	18
Havant	36	Conservative	13	Liberal Democrats/Labour/Green coalition	21
Hertsmere	39	Conservative	16	Labour/Liberal Democrats coalition	23
Huntingdonshire	52	Conservative	19	Liberal Democrats/Labour/St Neots Independent Group/Green/Independent coalition	32
King's Lynn and West Norfolk	55	Conservative	21	Independent/Liberal Democrats/Green coalition	21
Lancaster	61	Green	22	Green/Labour/Liberal Democrats coalition	50
Lewes	41	Green	16	Green/Labour coalition	24
Lichfield	47	Conservative	21	Conservative minority	21
Maidstone	49	Conservative	13	Liberal Democrats/Green/Independent coalition	26
Maldon	31	Conservative	10	Maldon District Independent Group minority	6
Malvern Hills	31	Independent	13	Independent/Green coalition	18
Melton	28	Conservative	10	Independent/Labour coalition	15
Mid Sussex	48	Liberal Democrats	20	Liberal Democrats/Independent coalition	24
Newark and Sherwood	39	Conservative	14	Labour minority	10
North Hertfordshire	51	Labour	25	Labour minority	25
North Warwickshire	35	Conservative	17	Conservative minority	17
North West Leicestershire	38	Labour	17	Conservative/Liberal Democrats/Independent coalition	19
Norwich	39	Labour	19	Labour minority	19
Oxford	48	Labour	20	Labour minority	20
Pendle	33	Conservative	13	Independent/Liberal Democrats coalition	18
Reigate and Banstead	45	Conservative	19	Conservative minority	19
Ribble Valley	40	Conservative	17	Conservative minority	17
Rochford	39	Liberal Democrats	11	Liberal Democrats/Independent/Green coalition	21
Rother	38	Conservative	10	Labour/Rother Association of Independent Councillors/Liberal Democrats/Green coalition	24
Rugby	42	Conservative	17	Conservative minority	17
Runnymede	41	Conservative	12	Labour/Liberal Democrats/RIRG/Green/Independent coalition	25
South Kesteven	56	Conservative	22	Independent/Liberal Democrats/Green coalition	28
South Norfolk	46	Conservative	23	Conservative minority	23
Spelthorne	39	Conservative	16	Liberal Democrats/Independent coalition	14
Stafford	40	Conservative	15	Labour/Stafford Borough Independents/Green coalition	24
Staffordshire Moorlands	56	Labour	23	Labour minority	23
Stroud	51	Green	22	Green minority	22
Swale	47	Labour	16	Labour/Swale Independents/Green/Independent coalition	30
Tandridge	43	Liberal Democrats	11	Independent/Oxted and Limpsfield Residents Group coalition	20
Tendring	48	Conservative	14	Independent/Labour/Liberal Democrats coalition	28
Tewkesbury	38	Liberal Democrats	16	Liberal Democrats/Independent/Green coalition	29
Tonbridge and Malling	44	Conservative	20	Conservative minority	20
Torridge	36	Independent	16	Independent minority	16
Warwick	44	Green	14	Green/Labour coalition	24
Waverley	50	Liberal Democrats	22	Liberal Democrats/Farnham Residents Party/Labour/Green coalition	38
Wealden	45	Liberal Democrats	11	Liberal Democrats/Green coalition	22
Wealden	45	Green	11	Liberal Democrats/Green coalition	22
Welwyn Hatfield	48	Labour	20	Labour/Liberal Democrats coalition	36
West Devon	31	Conservative	11	Independent/Green/Liberal Democrats/Labour coalition	20
West Lancashire	48	Labour	13	Conservative/Our West Lancashire coalition	23
West Lindsey	36	Liberal Democrats	17	Liberal Democrats minority	17
West Oxfordshire	49	Liberal Democrats	21	Liberal Democrats/Labour/Green coalition	36
West Suffolk	64	Conservative	26	Labour/Independent/West Suffolk Independent/Liberal Democrats/Green coalition	28
Worcester	35	Labour	17	Labour minority	17

== See also ==
- Coalition
- Hung parliament
