= Basingstoke and Deane =

Coordinates: 51.256°N 1.111°W

- Borough and non-metropolitan district
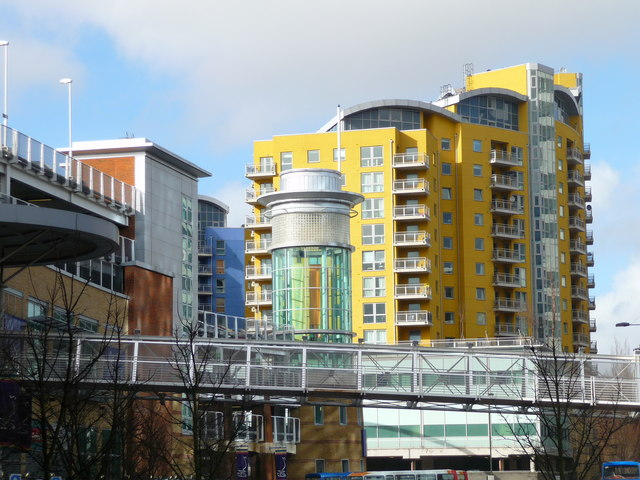
- Basingstoke. Crown Heights

- Basingstoke and Deane shown within Hampshire
- Sovereign state: United Kingdom
- Constituent country: England
- Region: South East England
- Non-metropolitan county: Hampshire
- Status: Non-metropolitan district
- Admin HQ: Basingstoke
- Incorporated: 1 April 1974

Government
  - Type: Non-metropolitan district council
  - Body: Basingstoke and Deane Borough Council
  - MPs: Luke Murphy; Kit Malthouse; Alex Brewer; Damian Hinds

Area
  - Total: 244.7 sq mi (633.8 km^{2})
  - Rank: 56th (of 296)

Population (2025)
  - Total: 194,037
  - Rank: 106th (of 296)
  - Density: 792.9/sq mi (306.1/km^{2})

Ethnicity (2021)
  - Ethnic groups: List: 88.5% White; 5.9% Asian; 2.5% Mixed; 2% Black; 1.1% other

Religion (2021)
  - Religion: List: 45.4% Christianity; 43.4% no religion; 5.6% not stated; 2.2% Hinduism; 1.5% Islam; 0.9% Buddhism; 0.6% other; 0.3% Sikhism; 0.1% Judaism
- Time zone: UTC0 (GMT)
  - Summer (DST): UTC+1 (BST)
- ONS code: 24UB (ONS); E07000084 (GSS)
- OS grid reference: SU620511

Basingstoke and Deane is a local government district with borough status in Hampshire, England. The main town is Basingstoke, where the council is based. The district also includes the towns of Tadley and Whitchurch, along with numerous villages and surrounding rural areas. The modern district was created in 1974, initially being called Basingstoke. It changed its name to "Basingstoke and Deane" in 1978 at the same time that it was made a borough; Deane was added to the name to represent the rural parts of the borough, being the area's smallest village.

Parts of the borough lie within the North Wessex Downs, an Area of Outstanding Natural Beauty. The neighbouring districts are Hart, East Hampshire, Winchester, Test Valley, West Berkshire and Wokingham.

== History ==
The town of Basingstoke was an ancient borough. It appears to have had a degree of self-government from at least the thirteenth century, was incorporated as a borough in 1392 and was given the right to appoint a mayor in 1641. It was reformed in 1836 to become a municipal borough.

The modern district was created on 1 April 1974 under the Local Government Act 1972, covering the area of three former districts, which were all abolished at the same time:

- Basingstoke Municipal Borough
- Basingstoke Rural District
- Kingsclere and Whitchurch Rural District

The new district was initially named Basingstoke, after its largest town. Charter trustees were established for the area of the former borough of Basingstoke, allowing the district councillors representing that area to choose one of their number to take the title of mayor, continuing Basingstoke's series of mayors dating back to 1641. On 20 January 1978 the district was renamed Basingstoke and Deane and granted borough status, allowing the chair of the council to take the title of mayor instead, with the charter trustees being dissolved at the same time. The name Deane was chosen to represent the rural parts of the borough as it was said by the council to be the area's smallest village.

In March 2026, the government announced that it would abolish the borough in 2028 as part of local government reform across Hampshire. These proposals were withdrawn in September 2026.

Basingstoke and Deane has three official Twin towns across Europe:

- Alençon in France since 1968
- Braine-l'Alleud in Belgium since 1979
- Euskirchen in Germany since 1986

== Governance ==
Basingstoke and Deane Borough Council

Type
- Type: Non-metropolitan district

Leadership
- Mayor: Jacky Tustaine, Labour since 14 May 2026
- Leader: Paul Harvey, Basingstoke & Deane Independents since 18 May 2023
- Chief Executive: Russell O'Keefe since 4 January 2021

Structure
- Seats: 54 councillors
- Political groups: Administration (29) Independent Forum (19) B&DI (12) Green (2) All In Party (2) Independent (3) Liberal Democrats (10) Opposition (25) Conservative (11) Labour (10) Reform (3) Independent (1)

Elections
- Voting system: First past the post
- Last election: 7 May 2026

Meeting place
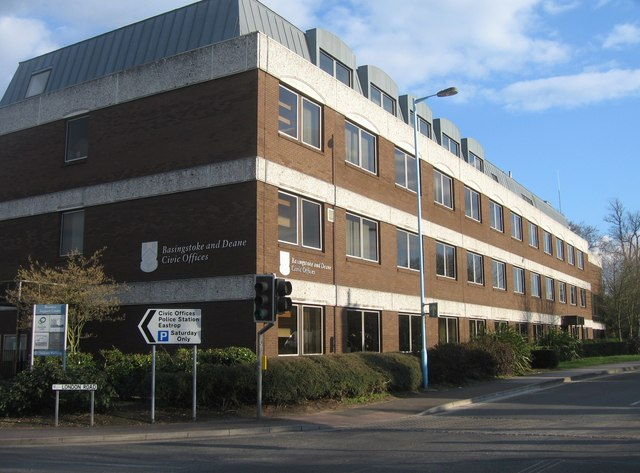
- Civic Offices, London Road, Basingstoke, RG21 4AH

Website
- www.basingstoke.gov.uk

Basingstoke and Deane Borough Council provides district-level services. County-level services are provided by Hampshire County Council. Much of the borough is covered by civil parishes, which form a third tier of local government, although the main urban area of Basingstoke is an unparished area.

=== Political control ===
The council has been under no overall control since 2022. Following the 2023 election a minority administration of the Liberal Democrats and the "Independent Forum" (at the time, comprising local party the Basingstoke and Deane Independents, two Green councillors and the independent councillors) took control of the council. Paul Harvey of the Basingstoke and Deane Independents was appointed leader of the council and Liberal Democrat leader Gavin James was appointed deputy leader (but styled "co-leader"). Labour voted in favour of the new administration forming, but does not form part of the administration itself, with all positions on the council's cabinet held by Liberal Democrats or members of the Independent Forum.

The first election to the modern council was held in 1973, initially acting as a shadow authority alongside the outgoing authorities until the new arrangements took effect on 1 April 1974. Political control of the council since 1974 has been as follows:

Party in control	Years
No overall control	1974–1976
Conservative	1976–1982
No overall control	1982–1986
Conservative	1986–1994
No overall control	1994–2006
Conservative	2006–2008
No overall control	2008–2008
Conservative	2008–2013
No overall control	2013–2015
Conservative	2015–2019
No overall control	2019–2021
Conservative	2021–2022
No overall control	2022–present

=== Leadership ===
The role of mayor is largely ceremonial in Basingstoke and Deane. Political leadership is instead provided by the leader of the council. The leaders since 2003 have been:

Councillor	Party	From	To
Brian Gurden	Liberal Democrats		May 2003
Rob Donnelly	Labour	May 2003	Jun 2004
Brian Gurden	Liberal Democrats	2004	May 2005
Paul Harvey	Labour	May 2005	May 2006
John Leek	Conservative	May 2006	May 2008
Andrew Finney	Conservative	May 2008	15 Dec 2011
Clive Sanders	Conservative	9 Feb 2012	16 May 2019
Ken Rhatigan	Conservative	16 May 2019	3 Feb 2022
Simon Minas-Bound	Conservative	28 Feb 2022	18 May 2023
Paul Harvey	B&DI	18 May 2023	

=== Composition ===
Following the 2026 election, the composition of the council was:

Party	Councillors
Basingstoke & Deane Independents	12
Liberal Democrats	11
Conservative Party	11
Labour Party	10
Reform UK	3
Independent	3
Green Party of England and Wales	2
The All In Party	2
Total	54

=== Premises ===
The council is based at the Civic Offices on London Road. The old Basingstoke Town Council had bought a large eighteenth century house called Goldings at 5 London Road in 1922 and converted it to become municipal offices. Following the creation of the new council in 1974 a new office building incorporating a council chamber was built west of Goldings, opening in 1976 and now being called Deanes. Additional offices to the east of Goldings were subsequently added c. 1990 called Parklands. Goldings is now used as a register office with the council being based at Deanes and Parklands, with the two buildings together being called the Civic Offices.

== Towns and parishes ==
Much of the borough is covered by civil parishes, with the parish councils for Tadley and Whitchurch taking the style "town council". Some of the smaller parishes have a parish meeting rather than a parish council. The town of Basingstoke itself (roughly corresponding to the pre-1974 borough) is an unparished area, directly administered by the borough council.

== Media ==
=== Television ===
The area is served by BBC South and ITV Meridian with television signals receive from the Hannington TV transmitter.

=== Radio ===
Radio stations for the area are:

- BBC Radio Berkshire
- Heart South
- Greatest Hits Radio Berkshire & North Hampshire

=== Newspapers ===
Local newspapers are the Basingstoke Gazette, and Basingstoke Observer, and Hampshire Chronicle.

== Elections ==
Since the last boundary changes in 2021 the council has comprised 54 councillors representing 18 wards, with each ward electing three councillors. Elections are held three years out of every four, with a third of the council (one councillor for each ward) being elected at a time for a four-year term of office. Hampshire County Council elections are held in the fourth year of the cycle when there are no borough council elections.

The wards are:

- Basing and Upton Grey
- Bramley
- Brighton Hill
- Brookvale and Kings Furlong
- Chineham
- Eastrop and Grove
- Evingar
- Hatch Warren and Beggarwood
- Kempshott and Buckskin
- Norden
- Oakley and the Candovers
- Popley
- Sherborne St John and Rooksdown
- South Ham
- Tadley and Pamber
- Tadley North, Kingsclere and Baughurst
- Whitchurch, Overton and Laverstoke
- Winklebury and Manydown
