= Farnborough (Main) railway station =

Railway station in Hampshire, England

Coordinates: 51°17′49″N 0°45′22″W

Farnborough (Main)
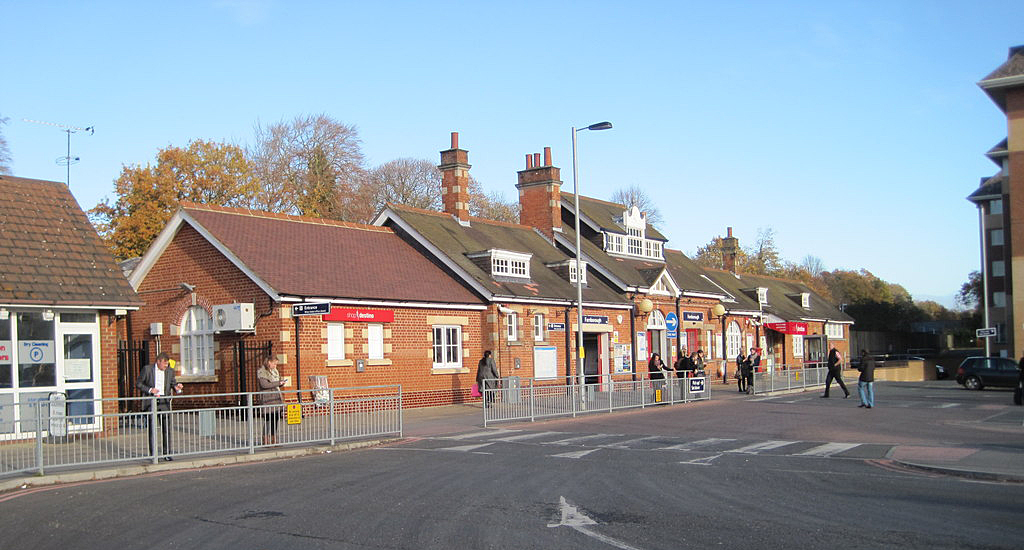
- The station entrance

General information
- Location: Farnborough, Borough of Rushmoor; England
- Grid reference: SU868560
- Manager: South Western Railway
- Platforms: 2
- Tracks: 4

Other information
- Station code: FNB
- Classification: DfT category C2

History
- Opened: 24 September 1838; 188 years ago

Passengers
- 2021/22: ▲1.514 million
- Interchange: ▲4,498
- 2022/23: ▲1.940 million
- Interchange: ▲5,162
- 2023/24: ▲2.064 million
- Interchange: ▲6,069
- 2024/25: ▲2.235 million
- Interchange: ▲11,168
- 2025/26: ▲2.324 million
- Interchange: ▼11,013
Location
Notes
- Passenger statistics from the Office of Rail and Road

Farnborough (Main) railway station is a stop on the South West Main Line and serves the town of Farnborough, in Hampshire, England. The station is operated by South Western Railway, along with all trains serving it.

It is one of three stations in the town; the others, Farnborough North and North Camp, are both situated on the North Downs Line. The station is usually known as Farnborough (Main) in order to distinguish it, including by National Rail and South Western Railway, although it is often signposted simply as Farnborough.

The station is 33 miles 17 chains (53.5 km) (Note: Railways in the United Kingdom historically are measured in miles and chains. There are 80 chains to one mile.) from London Waterloo, between Brookwood and Fleet stations.

== History ==
Farnborough railway station was opened in 1838 by the London and South Western Railway (then the London and Southampton Railway), on the line from London to Winchfield (then Shapley Heath). The next year, the line was extended to Basingstoke, then the next year it was connected to Southampton. Throughout its life, Farnborough has been a through station.

In 1849, South Eastern Railway built the North Downs Line and opened a station also known as Farnborough, but it was not renamed as its existing name, Farnborough North, until 1923. The main line station was often known as Farnborough (Main) and this has become its official name. It is referred to as simply Farnborough on platform and road signs, but National Rail and South Western Railway officially use the suffix, although not on timetables. It was sometimes advertised as Farnborough for Aldershot at an early stage.

As with Hook and Winchfield, there is a wide gap between the tracks. Originally, an island platform stood between them. When the railway was quadrupled, the existing up (London-bound) track became the down (Southampton-bound) fast. The former up platform, an island which had a loop line running behind it was demolished with the loop line becoming the up fast. The new up slow line and a new platform for 'up' services were built at this time (early 1900s).

One source suggests that the station may have been used by Queen Victoria to get to Windsor Castle, though the main station she used for Windsor was Slough until Windsor got its own station.

A 2011 forecourt refurbishment added two lifts to the platforms plus a new transport interchange with taxi rank, three new bus stops and a large bicycle shelter. In 2012 the station booking hall was extensively modernised and enlarged. A double-level car park was built in 2014.

=== Accidents and incidents ===
- On 26 November 1947, a passenger train was in a rear-end collision with another, hauled by SR Lord Nelson Class 4-6-0 No. 860 Lord Hawke, due to a signalman's error. Two people were killed.
- On 5 April 2016, the "country" side waiting room was subjected to an arson attack.

== Facilities ==
The station has three coffee shops, a waiting room on each platform, a ticket office, self-service ticket machines, smartcard travel facilities and bicycle parking facilities.

== Services ==
South Western Railway operates all services at Farnborough (Main) station. The typical off-peak service per hour is:

- Two trains each way between Basingstoke and London Waterloo;
- One train each way between Portsmouth Harbour and London Waterloo.

Preceding station	National Rail	Following station
Brookwood	South Western Railway; London–Basingstoke services	Fleet
Clapham Junction	South Western Railway; London–Poole services	Fleet
Woking	South Western Railway; London–Portsmouth via Winchester services	Basingstoke
	Historical railways	
Woking	Anglia Railways; London Crosslink	Basingstoke
