= Worting =

Village and parish in Hampshire, England

Coordinates: 51.261979°N 1.1364345°W

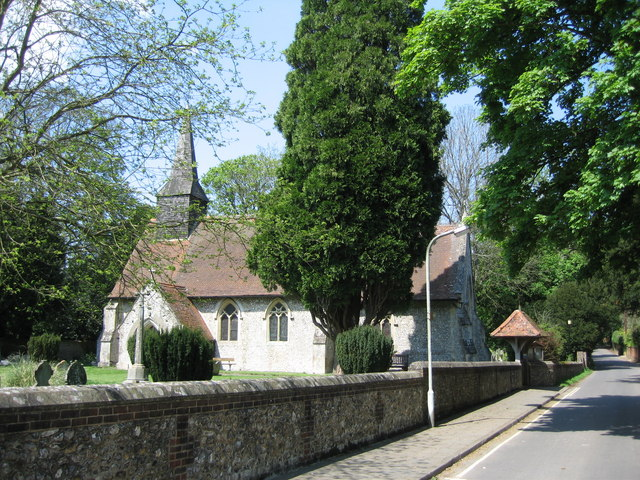
- Church of St Thomas of Canterbury on Church Lane

- Location within Hampshire
- OS grid reference: SU6035251778
- District: Basingstoke and Deane
- Shire county: Hampshire
- Region: South East
- Country: England
- Sovereign state: United Kingdom
- Post town: BASINGSTOKE
- Postcode district: RG22 5
- Dialling code: 01256
- Police: Hampshire and Isle of Wight
- Fire: Hampshire and Isle of Wight
- Ambulance: South Central
- UK Parliament: Basingstoke

Worting is a former village and now a district of Basingstoke, in the Basingstoke and Deane district, in Hampshire, England. It was formed around 1970 as part of the Basingstoke Town Centre Development Plan. The area is bounded to the south by Hatch Warren and Worting Junction. To the east are the districts of Brighton Hill and the Cranbourne area.

== History ==
The manor of Worting dates back to 1016, and was owned by Winchester Abbey until the dissolution of the monasteries.

The village was devastated by fire in 1655. The current church, dedicated to St Thomas a Becket, dates from 1848, and is Grade II listed. The Old Rectory on Church Lane dates from 1732.

Worting House is a Grade II* manor house, dating from the late 18th century, with Italianate details. Former residents include Sir Edward Bates MP, Lord Spencer Chichester and Major-General Sir Arthur Warren.

In 1931, the civil parish had a population of 365. On 1 April 1932, the parish was abolished and merged with Basingstoke and Wootton St Lawrence. It is now in the unparished area of Basingstoke.
