= Norfolk House, Basingstoke =

Coordinates: 51.2787°N 1.1049°W

Norfolk House
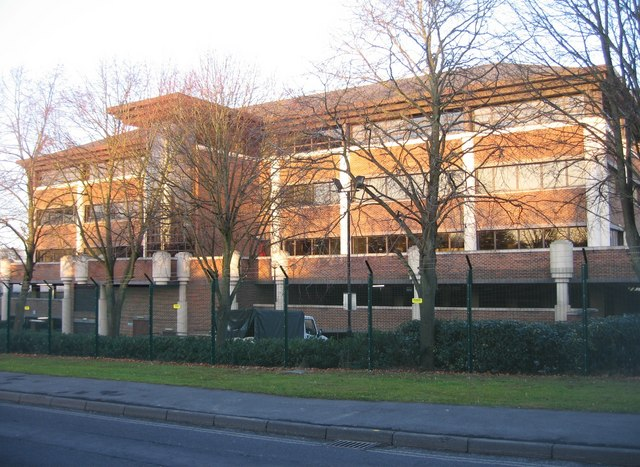
- Norfolk House in 2009
- Interactive map of the Norfolk House area
- Alternative names: Lilly House

General information
- Location: Basingstoke, England
- Demolished: 2022

Norfolk House, in Basingstoke, Hampshire, England, was the headquarters of The Automobile Association from the mid-1990s until 2003. It was originally intended to replace Fanum House as the AA's HQ, but ultimately the building was not large enough to accommodate all Basingstoke-based employees and both buildings operated concurrently.

The building was purpose-built, and located at the Aldermaston Road roundabout, at the junction of the Basingstoke ring road and the A340 - it replaced The AA's main warehouse built on that site which was also known as Norfolk House. It consisted of three permanent structures, the main office block and car park, a technology centre (the Durie Centre), and the AA sports and social club (the Fanum Club) museum which featured squash courts and other sports facilities, with a bar on part of the first floor. There was also a security gatehouse and a petrol pump, used by AA employees to fill company vehicles.

The main building was above three levels of undercover car park. There were three floors, including the entrance (ground) floor. The ground floor featured a large reception area with marble floors, an employee cafeteria, and office wings on either side accessible to employees by swiping their ID card. The offices were constructed around internal garden areas. The upper floors were accessed by a curved, floating staircase, or by lift. Each floor had a circular balcony overlooking the reception area.

One side of the 2nd (top) floor was a plush executive suite, with very large glass offices for the AA Director-General and the other directors, executive washrooms, and meeting rooms. The AA boardroom with an anteroom was within this suite. The executive suite was not accessible to the majority of employees, as it required a special ID card access. There was also a dedicated executive catering facility, with its own dining rooms. These were used both by the directors on a day-to-day basis, and for entertaining guests from other motoring associations worldwide and commercial partners.

After the purchase of the AA by Centrica in 1999, various Centrica functions moved into the building, and it was used jointly by Centrica, British Gas and AA employees until its closure. The executive facilities were dispensed with. After it closed, the building stood empty for some time, until it was occupied by the pharmaceutical company Eli Lilly and Company and renamed Lilly House. Eli Lilly later moved their offices to Basing View, leaving the building to be demolished in 2022.

In 2023, the developers Glencar and Wrenbridge began construction of a new logistics warehouse in the area. It is being forward funded by the developer GLP, who has set a goal for net zero target emissions.

== AA Museum ==
The AA Museum featured exhibits of AA memorabilia from over the years, everything from badges and signs to petrol pumps, many photographs, and vehicles including an AA-liveried Minivan, a Land Rover and various motorcycles.

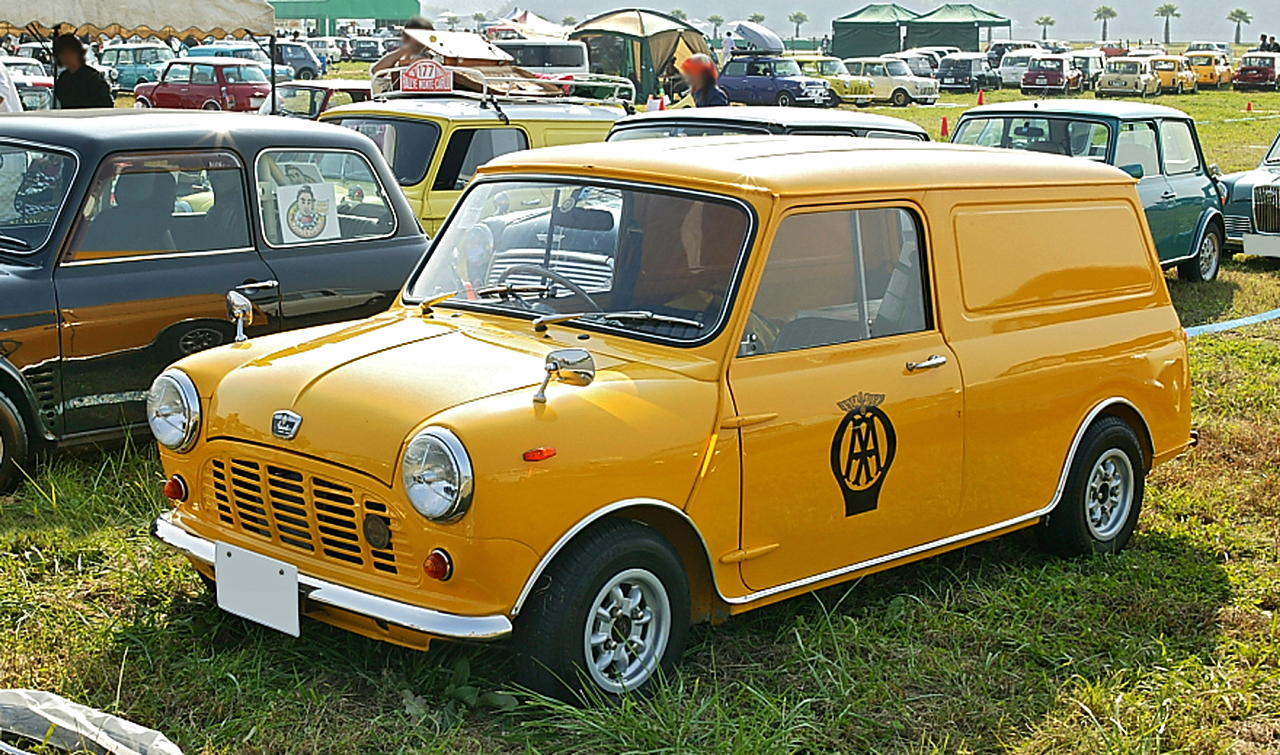

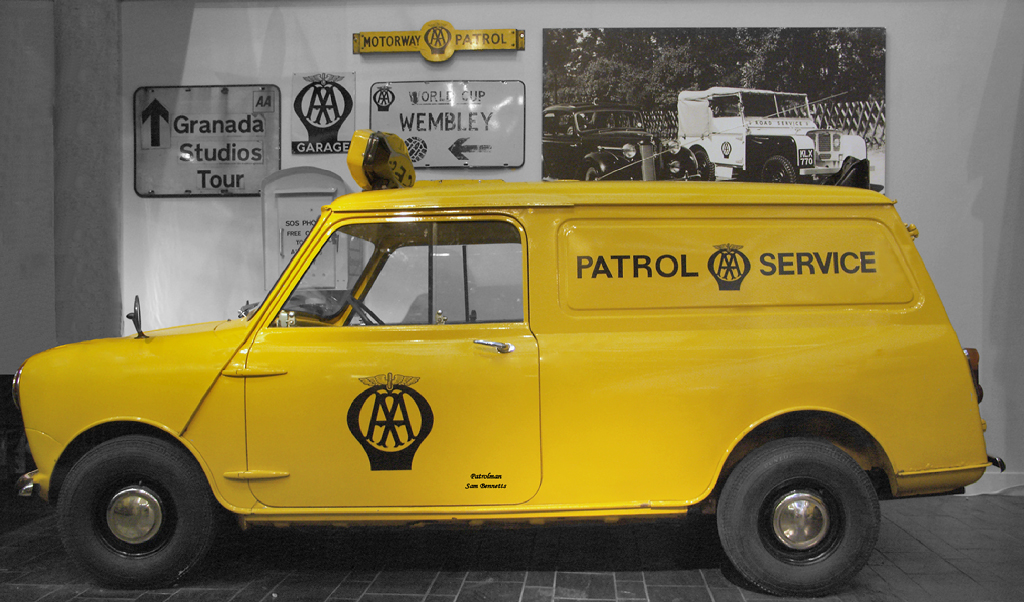

After the closure of Norfolk House, the museum was incorporated into the Milestones Museum in Basingstoke.
