= Winchfield railway station =

Railway station in Hampshire, England

Winchfield
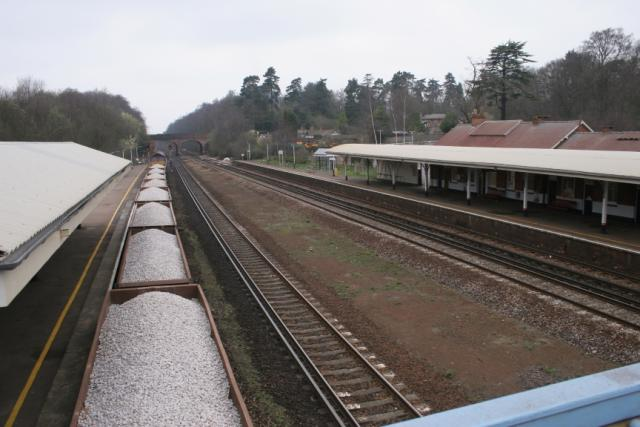
- Winchfield railway station seen from the bridge

General information
- Location: Winchfield, District of Hart; England
- Coordinates: 51°17′06″N 0°54′25″W
- Grid reference: SU763545
- Managed by: South Western Railway
- Platforms: 2
- Tracks: 4

Other information
- Station code: WNF
- Classification: DfT category D

History
- Opened: 24 September 1838; 187 years ago (as Shapley Heath)
- Original company: London and Southampton Railway
- Pre-grouping: London and South Western Railway
- Post-grouping: Southern Railway

Key dates
- by November 1840: Renamed Winchfield

Passengers
- 2020/21: ▼54,022
- 2021/22: ▲0.164 million
- 2022/23: ▲0.215 million
- 2023/24: ▲0.227 million
- 2024/25: ▲0.229 million
Location
Notes
- Passenger statistics from the Office of Rail and Road

Winchfield railway station is located in the small village of Winchfield, Hampshire, England, and also serves nearby areas including Hartley Wintney, Odiham, Whitehall, and other surrounding villages.

The station lies 39 miles 66 chains (64.1 km) down the main line from London Waterloo, (Note: Railways in the United Kingdom historically are measured in miles and chains. There are 80 chains to one mile.) situated between Fleet and Hook. Services typically run every 30 minutes between Waterloo and Basingstoke.

== History ==
The London and South Western Railway (then London and Southampton railway) built a line from London to Southampton via Basingstoke. The railway reached the area from Woking on 24 September 1838, and Winchfield station was initially opened as Shapley Heath, serving as a temporary terminus. On 10 June the following year, the line was extended to Basingstoke, and Shapley Heath became a through station. It was soon renamed Winchfield after the nearby village; while the exact date of this is unclear, the change had occurred by November 1840.

Like the stations at Hook and Farnborough Main, Winchfield has a noticeable gap between the middle tracks. When the SW Main Line was quadrupled around 1900 an island platform was provided which was later removed. When the station was expanded to accommodate quadrupling, one platform was rebuilt further away, resulting in the current platforms having different canopy styles.

== Services ==
The station is served by two trains per hour in each direction during off-peak hours from Monday to Saturday, with additional services during weekday peak times. On Sundays, trains operate once an hour in each direction.

== Notes ==
Preceding station	National Rail	Following station
Fleet	South Western Railway; South West Main Line	Hook
