= Fanum =

Fanum may refer to:

- Fanum (streamer) (Roberto Escanio, born 1997), Dominican-American content creator
- Fanum (Roman religion), a sacred space in ancient Roman religion
- Fanum House, the former headquarters of the Automobile Association in Basingstoke, England
- Fanum Fortunae, an ancient town in Italy
- Fanum Carisi, a commune in Italy
