= Viables =

Neighbourhood of Basingstoke, Hampshire, England

Coordinates: 51.249796°N 1.089698°W

- Location within Hampshire
- OS grid reference: SU6363050463
- District: Basingstoke and Deane
- Shire county: Hampshire
- Region: South East
- Country: England
- Sovereign state: United Kingdom
- Post town: Basingstoke
- Postcode district: RG25 2
- Dialling code: 01256
- Police: Hampshire and Isle of Wight
- Fire: Hampshire and Isle of Wight
- Ambulance: South Central
- UK Parliament: Basingstoke

Viables is a district of Basingstoke, England, that was formed around 1970 as part of the Basingstoke Town Centre Development Plan. The area is mostly made up of industry such as crafting centres, industrial and housing estates and the Jazz Buss Service. The area is bounded to the west by Hatch Warren and the A30. To the north is the district of Brighton Hill and the Cranbourne area.

The popular Craft Centre in the area was once an outlying farm, but due to the London overspill, the Viables and Brighton Hill districts were built around Basingstoke, declining the old farm.
