= BHCC =

The abbreviation BHCC may refer to:

- Brighton and Hove City Council, an English local authority
- The British Hill Climb Championship, a motorsport competition in the UK
- Bunker Hill Community College, a community college in Charlestown, Massachusetts, USA
- Brighton Hill Community College, a secondary school in Basingstoke, UK
