= Bournemouth to Birmingham route =

British railway route

The Bournemouth to Birmingham route is a part of the CrossCountry railway network in the UK. The route links Bournemouth to Birmingham, and consists of parts of several lines.

Trains running the full length of the route are run by CrossCountry, and it is additionally used in part by Avanti West Coast, Chiltern Railways, Great Western Railway, South Western Railway and West Midlands Trains. After joining the Cross Country Route at Birmingham, trains proceed to Manchester, Glasgow, Edinburgh or Aberdeen.

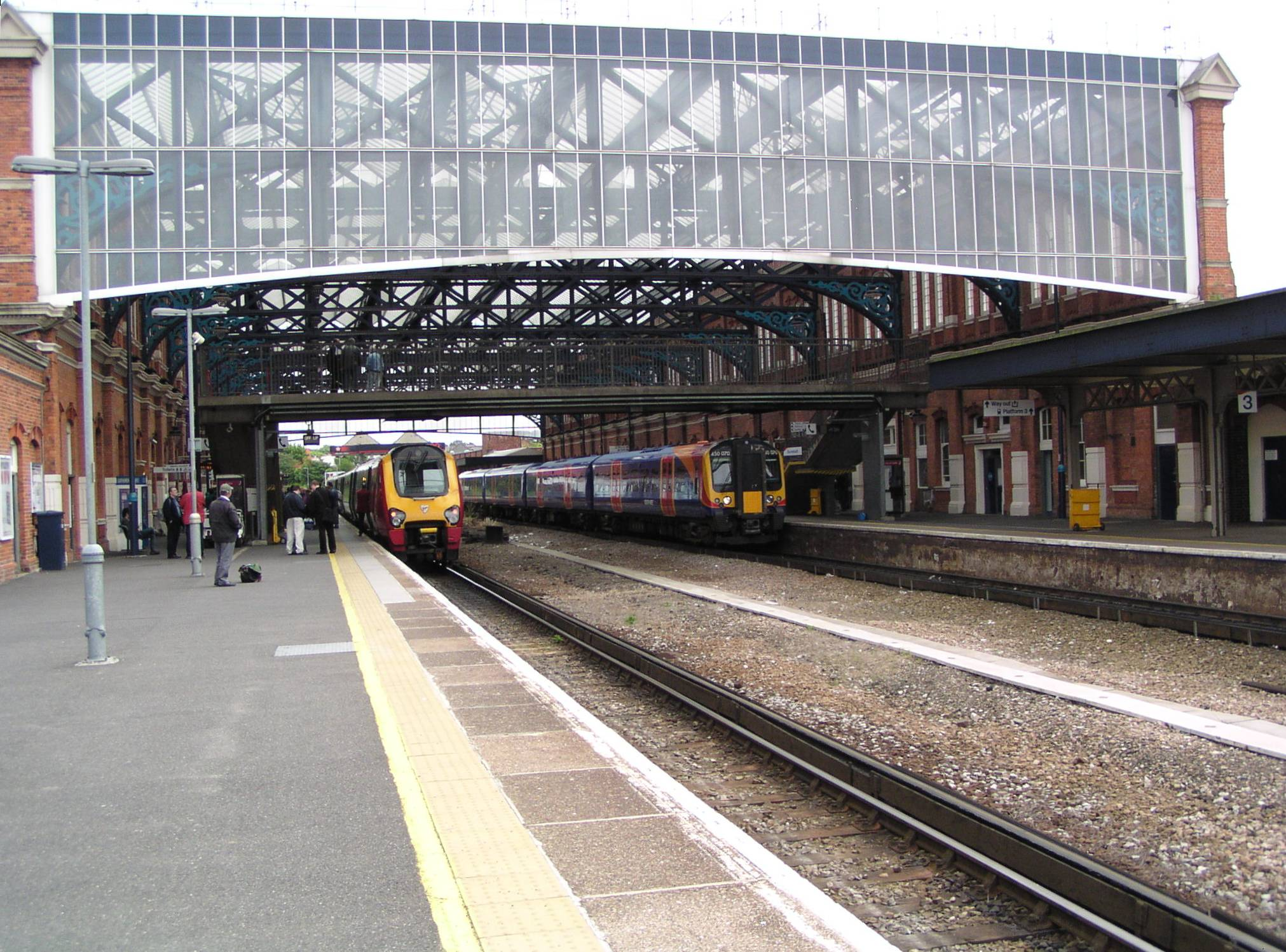
The southern terminus at Bournemouth

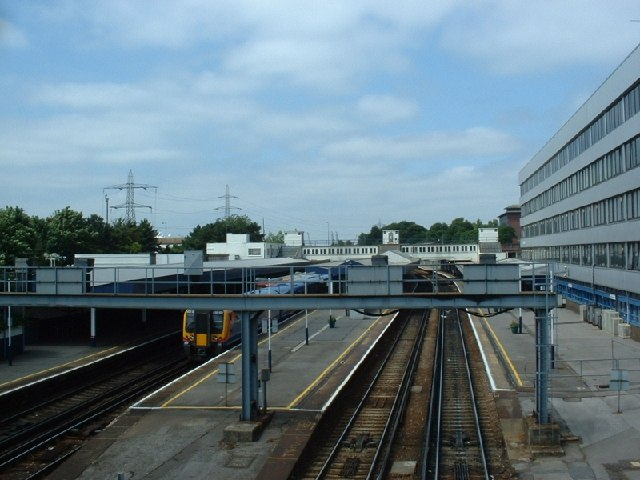
Southampton Central

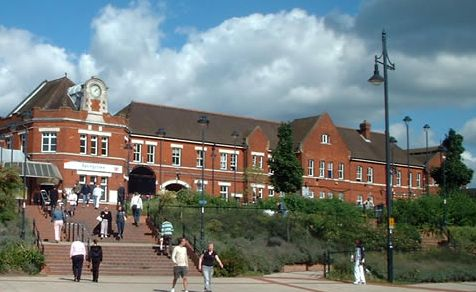
Basingstoke, where the line leaves the South West Main Line

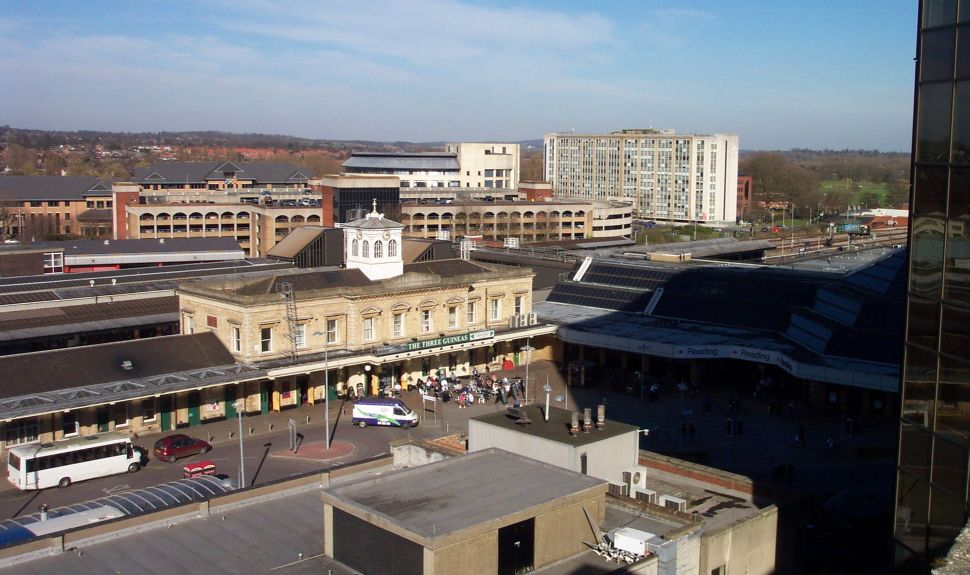
Reading, trains usually reverse in the platforms to the left or behind the GWR building

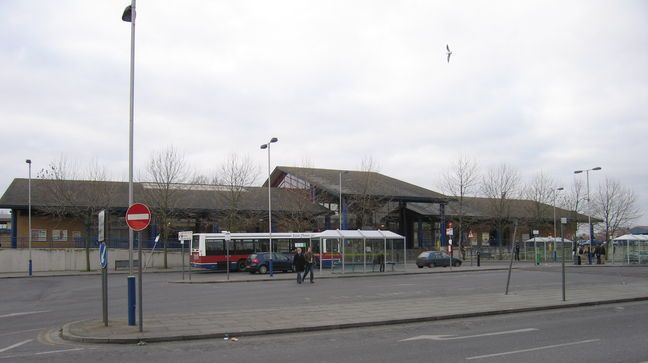
The station at Oxford on the Cherwell Valley Line

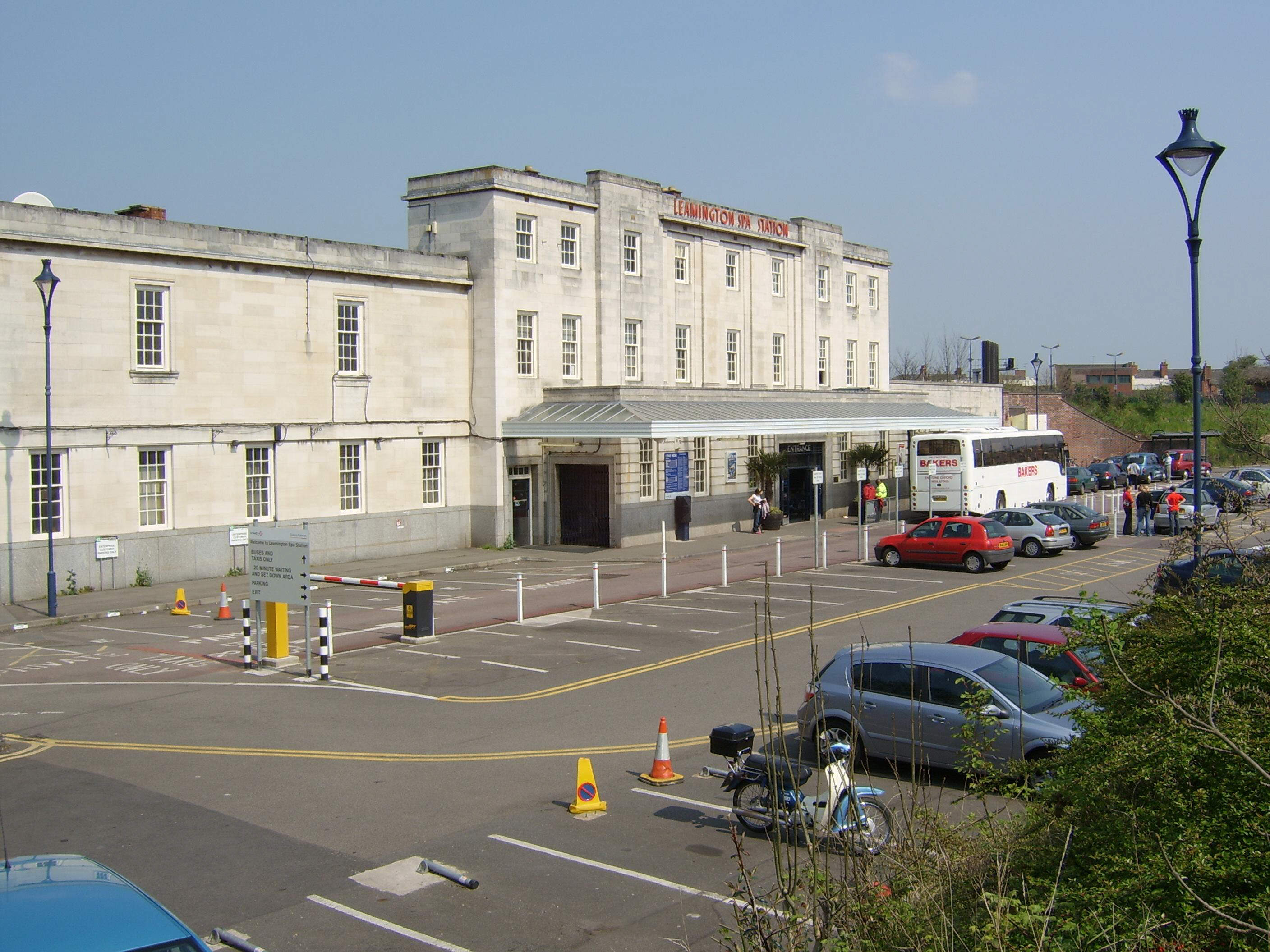
Leamington Spa, where trains leave the Chiltern Main Line
