= Lychpit =

Village in Hampshire, England

Coordinates: 51.27052°N 1.05245°W

Lychpit is a modern housing development adjacent to Old Basing near Basingstoke, Hampshire. The modern development started in the early 1980s but the area has an ancient past associated with that of Old Basing.

== Name ==
The name derives from a wooded dell that still exists at the western end of Little Basing. Lych or Lich being the Old English name for a corpse, it is assumed that the pit was therefore some kind of mass burial ground, local tradition associating it with the Danish victory over Alfred's Saxons at the Battle of Basing in 871. Another possibility is that it was used to bury casualties of the Battle of Basing House, where Oliver Cromwell's troops laid siege to and eventually sacked this large private house. Several of the local roads bear the names of Cromwell's officers e.g. Norton Ride and Gage Close.

== History ==
Immediately before the first modern houses were built Hampshire County Council which had bought much of the land, commissioned an archaeological survey. The soil was stripped revealing the underlying chalk and with the help of RAF helicopters from nearby RAF Odiham they were able to spot and photograph the staining caused by timber building post holes dating from the Bronze Age. Armed with this invaluable knowledge of where to look the survey revealed several ancient timber building sites, artifacts, and a few skeletons of similar vintage.

There are also visible remains of a Park Pale near Pyotts Hill, which surrounded a hunting park in the area during the Middle Ages. Park Pale is also said to be the line of part of a Roman road connecting the fort at Silchester with Chichester, another important Roman garrison on the South Coast.

== Amenities ==
Next to Lychpit is a public house and restaurant making use of an old water mill on the River Loddon, a tributary of the River Thames. The river is well-stocked with trout and visitors to the pub can sometimes see kingfishers that hunt along the river banks, despite the roar of frequent trains overhead on the London line.

== Buildings ==
Daneshill, which comprises rising and still wooded ground overlooking Lychpit has a reasonable example of Lutyens architecture in Daneshill House, formerly home to the Hoare family.

== Location ==
Position: grid reference SU662528
