= Basingstoke Aquadrome =

Leisure centre in Basingstoke, Hampshire, England

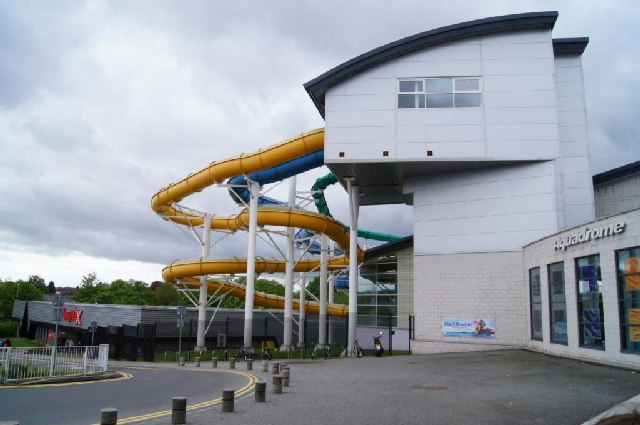
- Aquadrome and water slides
- Interactive map of Basingstoke Aquadrome
- Location: Basingstoke Hampshire, England
- Coordinates: 51.2649°N 1.1215°W
- Opened: 2002
- Website: https://www.basingstokeleisure.com/basingstoke-aquadrome

Basingstoke Aquadrome is a leisure centre and leisure water park in Basingstoke, Hampshire, UK.

It opened in 2002, replacing an outdoor lido complex built in the 1970s. As of 2026, a plan to replace the structure with a more energy-efficient new building was in the planning stages.
