= Festival Place =

Shopping centre in Basingstoke, UK

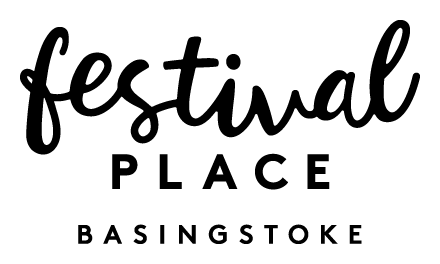

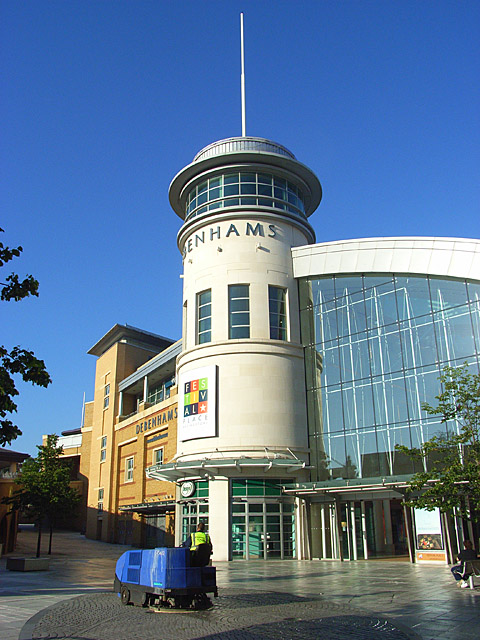
- Festival Place, eastern frontage
- Location: Basingstoke, UK
- Coordinates: 51.2658°N 1.0862°W
- Opened: 22 October 2002; 24 years ago
- Manager: CBRE
- Num. of stores: 160+
- Num. of anchor tenants: 3
- Floor area: 102,000 m^{2} (1,100,000 sq ft)
- Floors: 2 Retail Floors
- Parking: 2,500 spaces on 5 floors
- Public transit: Basingstoke railway station
- Website: festivalplace.co.uk

Festival Place is a shopping centre in Basingstoke, Hampshire, England which opened on Tuesday, 22 October 2002. It houses over 200 shops including large stores such as Next, Marks and Spencer, Apple Store and HMV. There are also restaurants, bars, and cafés, mostly located outside in the covered Festival Square. These include Nandos, Las Iguanas, Cosy Club.

The centre also incorporates a Vue cinema, Basingstoke Sports Centre, Basingstoke Discovery Centre and Flip Out Trampoline Park. It is located within Basingstoke town centre, close to Basingstoke railway station, and incorporates the town bus station and a multi-storey car park.

Festival Place was also home to The Breeze radio station, located in the centre management block, until it was rebranded as Greatest Hits Radio in September 2020.

Festival Place is 102,000 m^{2} (102 thousand square metres) in size.

== History ==
The area of Basingstoke which Festival Place now stands on was cleared in the 1960s where a large concrete shopping centre was built. The first phase, which became The Walks and New Market Square was completed at the end of the decade and The Walks was covered in the 1987. The second phase became The Malls and has since been altered further to include a new roofed area and new modernised areas (2011/2012). The third phase was abandoned and became The Anvil concert hall.

Festival Place was completed in 2002. The development replaced New Market Square and a 1960s multi-storey car park and included covering Porchester Square and extending the centre to the east into a new two-level section, Festival Square and the tower which is illuminated at night. The bus station was redeveloped and an amphitheatre was built beyond Festival Square and a fountain installed in neighbouring Eastrop Park.

Between 2018 and 2019, Festival Place underwent a major refurbishment project, with a new identity, logo and signage throughout the centre, the car park was massively overhauled with new signage, coloured parking zones, wider spaces, bay light monitoring system and increased disabled/parent parking spaces. Payment machines were only located on the ground floor of the mall, but they have now installed payment machines on every floor in the lift lobbies of the car park. St Johns Square which was part of the old town centre was refurbished with new shopfronts, fascias and the square given a new modern look with outdoor seating so it is in keeping with the new look of the centre and the opposite Malls Shopping Centre.

The centre was used by BBC's Top Gear (Series 12, Episode 6) by Jeremy Clarkson who was road testing a Ford Fiesta 2008 whilst being chased by "Baddies" in a Chevrolet Corvette.
