= Basingstoke railway station =

Railway station in Hampshire, England

Basingstoke
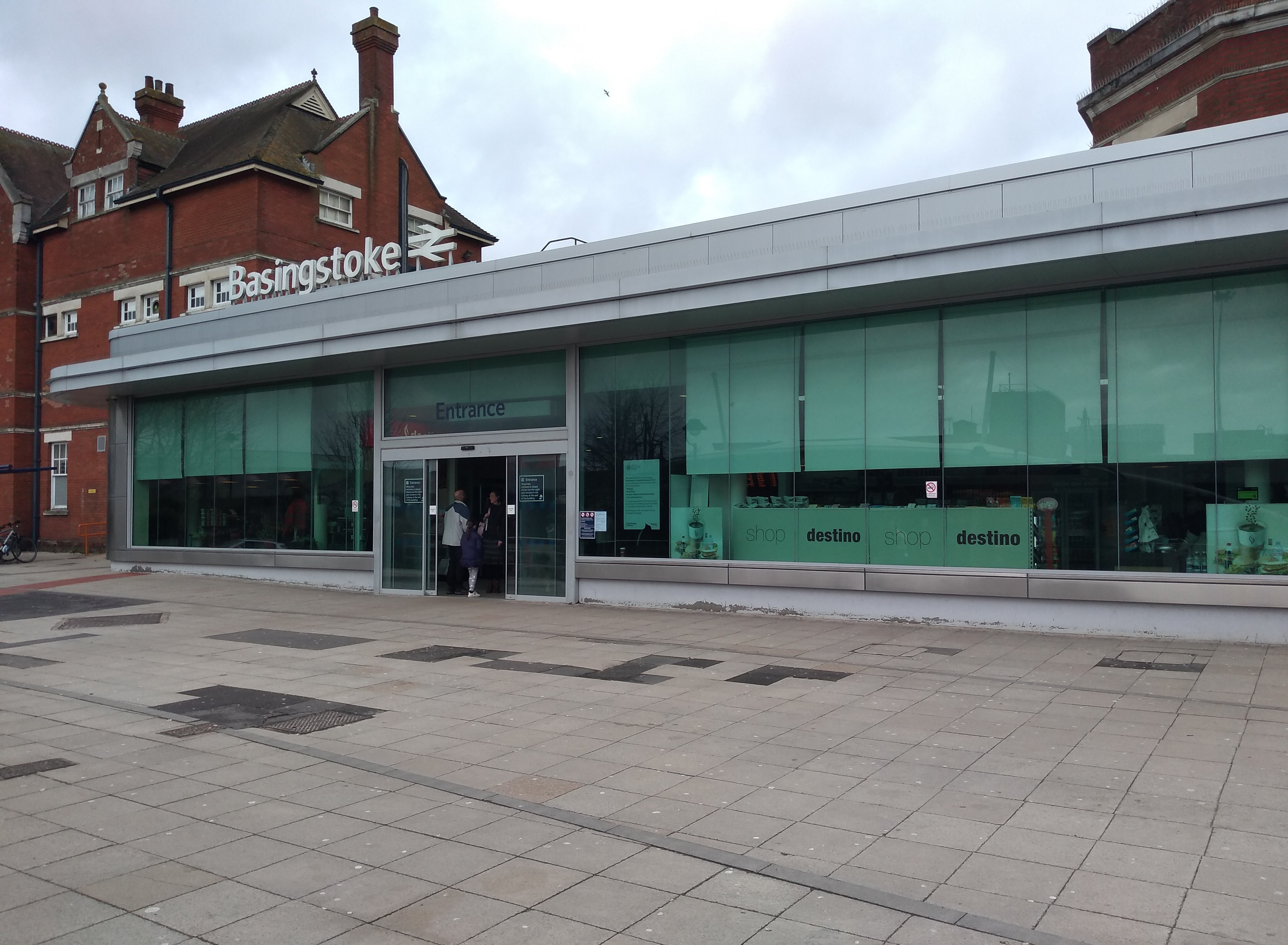
- Basingstoke station main entrance

General information
- Location: Basingstoke, Borough of Basingstoke and Deane; England
- Coordinates: 51.2683°N 1.0878°W
- Grid reference: SU637525
- Manager: South Western Railway
- Platforms: 5

Other information
- Station code: BSK
- Classification: DfT category B

History
- Original company: London and South Western Railway
- Pre-grouping: London and South Western Railway
- Post-grouping: Southern Railway

Key dates
- 10 June 1839: Station opened

Passengers
- 2020/21: ▼1.279 million
- Interchange: ▼0.414 million
- 2021/22: ▲3.662 million
- Interchange: ▲1.369 million
- 2022/23: ▲4.004 million
- Interchange: ▼1.077 million
- 2023/24: ▲4.240 million
- Interchange: ▼0.724 million
- 2024/25: ▲4.794 million
- Interchange: ▲0.830 million
Location
Notes
- Passenger statistics from the Office of Rail and Road

Basingstoke railway station serves the town of Basingstoke, in Hampshire, England. It is on the South West Main Line from London Waterloo, with local and fast services operated by South Western Railway. It is the terminus of Great Western Railway local services on the Reading–Basingstoke line. Long-distance cross-country services operated by CrossCountry to Bournemouth from Birmingham (the Bournemouth to Birmingham route), Manchester and further north, join the main line from the branch there.

It lies 47 miles 61 chains (76.9 km) down the line from London Waterloo and 51 miles 39 chains (82.9 km) from London Paddington.

== History ==
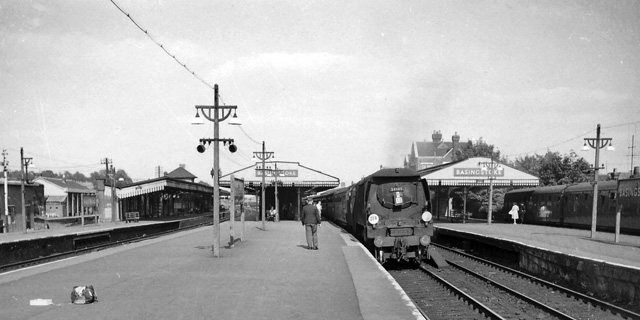
The station in 1963

The station was opened by the London and South Western Railway as a temporary terminus when its line to Southampton reached Basingstoke from London. It became a through station when the section running north from Southampton was completed later in 1840. The intention to build a line from near Basingstoke to Bristol was dropped when the Great Western Railway was approved. The L&SWR did, however plan a line to Salisbury from Basingstoke but this was delayed by financial difficulties. Eventually, it was built reaching Andover in 1854 and Salisbury three years later, before being extended to become the West of England Main Line.

The Great Western Railway opened its broad gauge line from Reading on 1 November 1848 with a separate station north of the L&SWR station. After its conversion to mixed gauge on 22 December 1856 through services could run between Southampton and Reading. The broad gauge rail was removed on 1 April 1869. The GWR station was closed on 1 January 1932 and demolished the same year. Since then trains from Reading have used the main station.

Basingstoke station was the terminus of the Basingstoke and Alton Light Railway, opened in 1901 to prevent the GWR from building a line on this route towards Portsmouth. The line was never profitable. During the First World War some of the track was sold off. After the war the Southern Railway reopened the line, but it was closed finally in 1932.

In the 1980s, platform 5 was converted to a bay platform to permit an entrance on the northern side by British Rail. In 1993, an explosive device planted by the Provisional Irish Republican Army was found in a toilet, soon after a bomb scare at Reading station. In 2001, a suitcase was left outside the station containing the mutilated body of a man in his twenties; he had been stabbed to death.

Anglia Railways ran the London Crosslink service from Ipswich to Basingstoke via Stratford and the North London Line using Class 170s between May 2000 and September 2002. South West Trains also ran a local service from Reading to Brighton until timetable changes on 9 December 2007. Southern railway services from Southampton and Portsmouth to Brighton were improved to compensate for that.

In 2012, improvements were made to the station, including a new stainless steel and glass frontage, an enlarged booking hall and a new waiting room on platforms 2 and 3. In 2022, South Western Railway introduced staff members called "Welcome Hosts" at this station and some others to provide information and sell tickets.

=== Incidents ===
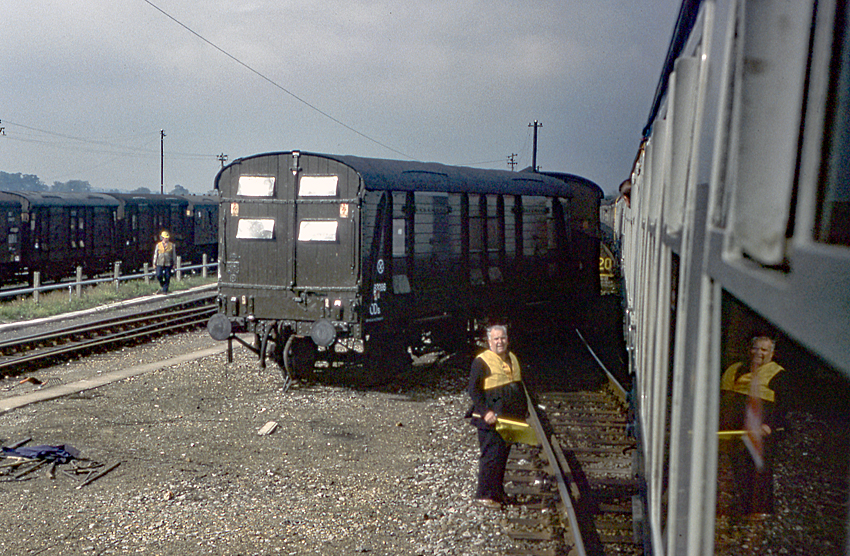
Shunting mishap at Basingstoke, 1977

On 19 December 2008, an over-height container on a freight train struck and damaged 140 yards (130 m) of the canopy of platform 1. The train was stopped before it reached the tunnels north of Micheldever.

=== Motive power depots ===
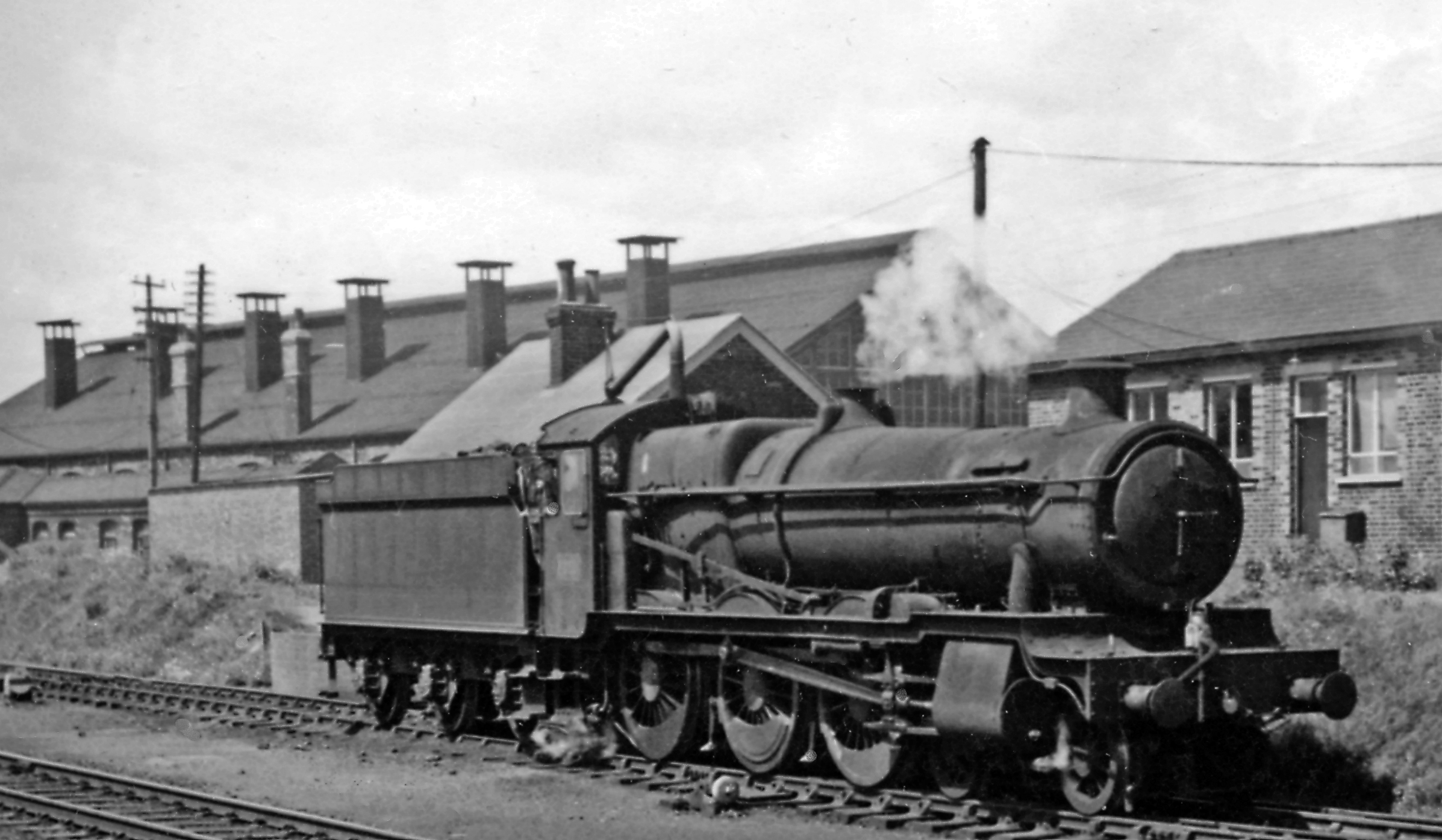
An ex-GW 6851 'Hurst Grange' 4-6-0 outside Basingstoke Locomotive Depot, 24 July 1965

The London and South Western Railway opened a locomotive shed, on the south side of the main line and to the west of the station in 1839. This was closed in 1909 to make way for station enlargement. It was replaced by a larger structure on the north side of the line. This was closed by British Railways in March 1963, but remained in use as a servicing point until the end of steam in July 1967. It was demolished in 1969.

The Berks and Hants Railway opened a small shed to the east of the station on the north side of the line in 1850. This was closed by British Railways in November 1950, and demolished to make way for sidings.

== Platforms ==
The station has four bi-directional through paltforms and a bay platform. They are above street level and are accessed via stairs and lifts from the booking hall and subway. There is a secondary entrance on platform 4.

- Platform 1: Terminating slow services to and from London Waterloo, westbound CrossCountry services to Southampton and Bournemouth and occasionally regional services to Southampton and Poole. Westbound freight trains also pass through here.
- Platform 2: Westbound services on the South West Main Line and West of England line
- Platform 3: Fast trains to London Waterloo.
- Platform 4: Northbound CrossCountry services to Reading, Birmingham New Street and onwards to the north. Semi-fast services to London Waterloo use this platform. Northbound freight trains also pass through here.
- Platform 5: Bay platform for stopping services to Reading on the Reading–Basingstoke line, operated by Great Western Railway.

== Facilities ==
The station has two entrances:

- The main entrance to the south has access to a taxi rank, some car parks and a bus stop, with steps down to The Malls shopping centre. A bridge over Churchill Way leads to the bus station. Festival Place can be accessed from The Malls or the bus station, while Festival Square and the Top of Town are located beyond the bus station.
- The northern entrance on platform 4 gives access to a car park.

The south booking hall has ticket facilities, including ticket machines, information and a small shop. The station is staffed all day and both entrances have ticket barriers. There is a small café on the central island platform and another on platform 4, as well as indoor waiting rooms.

== Signalling ==
The station area and its various routes have been controlled by colour light signalling since the mid-1960s. The 1966 panel box (which controlled the main line from west of Woking through to Micheldever and Andover along with part of the line to Reading) was located on the north side of the line to the east of the station, but this was superseded by a new facility in the northern car park, in 2007 when the area was resignalled.

Several routes have had their signal control moved to Basingstoke, including the West of England main line between Gillingham and Exmouth Jn in 2012 and the Poole - Wareham - Wool section of the line to Weymouth in 2015.

It was announced in 2013 that a new Network Rail signalling operating centre would be built in Basingstoke; the contract was for £30 million. Twelve such regional control centres were to be built in the following 15 to 30 years, which will be responsible for all the signalling in the Wessex & South West England area (right through from London Waterloo to Weymouth, Portsmouth Harbour and Exeter).

The centre opened on 2 November 2015. Between 2021 and 2024 control of the lines around Feltham, Twickenham, Staines, Strawberry Hill and Wokingham (Covering the areas previously controlled from Feltham and Wokingham) were moved to the Rail Operating Centre (ROC). In November 2025 control of the Portsmouth Direct Line between Farncombe and Petersfield was also moved to the ROC.

== Services ==
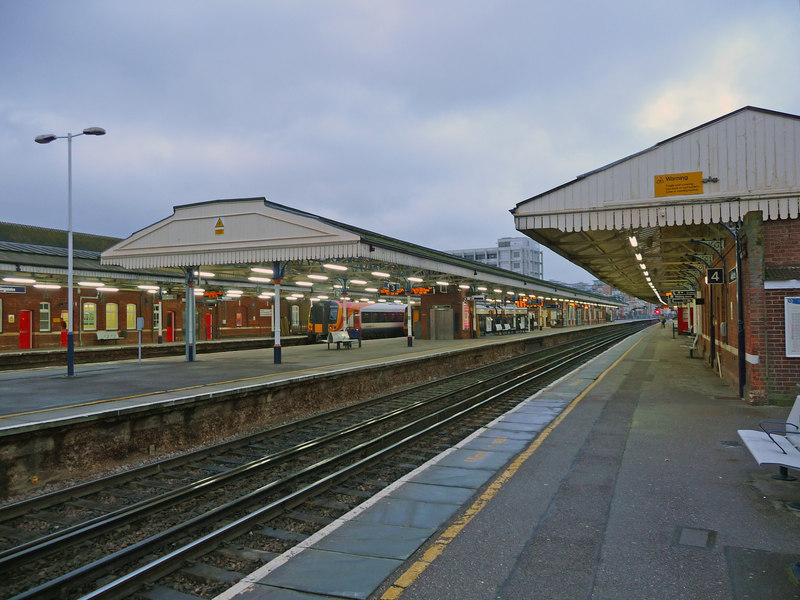
Basingstoke Station

Services at Basingstoke are operated by three train operating companies, with the following off-peak services in trains per hour:

South Western Railway

- 7 tph to London Waterloo
- 2 tph to Salisbury, one of which continues to either Yeovil Junction or Exeter St Davids (Note: South Western Railway are operating a reduced timetable on the West of England Line due to Soil Moisture Deficit, which came into effect on the 10th August 2026 and will be in effect until further notice. This timetable reduces the number of services west of Yeovil Junction to one train per two hours.)
- 1 tph to Poole (stopping)
- 1 tph to Weymouth
- 1 tph to Portsmouth Harbour via Eastleigh

Great Western Railway

- 2 tph to Reading

CrossCountry

- 1 tph to Bournemouth
- 1 tph to Manchester Piccadilly via Birmingham New Street.

Preceding station	National Rail	Following station
Hook	South Western Railway; Waterloo to Basingstoke	Terminus
Fleet or Farnborough (Main) or Woking or Clapham Junction	South Western Railway; South West Main Line; Fast/Semi-Fast Services	Winchester
Fleet or Farnborough (Main) or Woking or Clapham Junction	South Western Railway; South West Main Line; Stopping services	Micheldever
Woking	South Western Railway; West of England Main Line	Andover or Overton
Reading	CrossCountry; Bournemouth-Manchester	Winchester or Southampton Airport Parkway
Bramley	Great Western Railway; Reading to Basingstoke Line	Terminus
	Historical railways	
Farnborough (Main)	Anglia Railways; London Crosslink	Terminus
	Disused railways	
Terminus	Basingstoke and Alton Light Railway	Cliddesden
Terminus	Park Prewett Hospital Railway	Park Prewett Hospital
