= Fleet railway station =

Railway station in Hampshire, England

Fleet
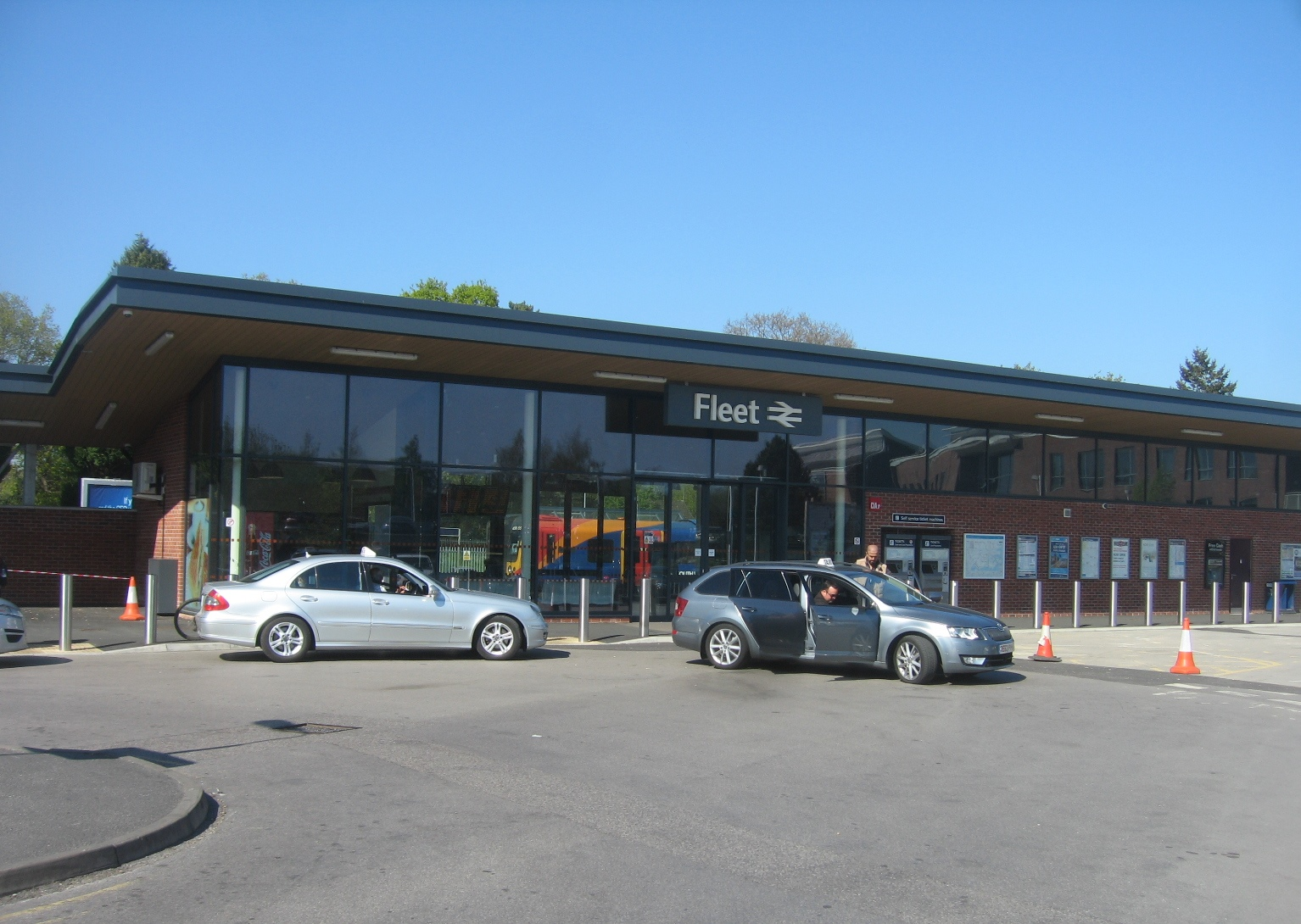

General information
- Location: Fleet, District of Hart; England
- Coordinates: 51.291°N 0.831°W
- Grid reference: SU816552
- Managed by: South Western Railway
- Platforms: 2
- Tracks: 4

Other information
- Station code: FLE
- Classification: DfT category C2

History
- Original company: London and South Western Railway
- Pre-grouping: London and South Western Railway
- Post-grouping: Southern Railway

Key dates
- May 1847: Opened as Fleet Pond
- 1 July 1869: Renamed Fleet
- 1904: Resited

Passengers
- 2020/21: ▼0.290 million
- Interchange: ▼1,047
- 2021/22: ▲0.834 million
- Interchange: ▲3,877
- 2022/23: ▲1.091 million
- Interchange: ▼451
- 2023/24: ▲1.277 million
- Interchange: ▲605
- 2024/25: ▲1.401 million
- Interchange: ▲720
Location
Notes
- Passenger statistics from the Office of Rail and Road

Fleet railway station serves the town of Fleet, in Hampshire, England. It is a stop on the South West Main Line, which has four tracks through the station. There are two platforms on the outer pair of tracks: platform 1 is for trains to London Waterloo and platform 2 for Basingstoke and Portsmouth Harbour; the centre pair of tracks have no platforms and are used by through-services.

The station and all trains calling there are operated by South Western Railway. It lies 36 miles 38 chains (58.7 km) from Waterloo (Note: Railways in the United Kingdom historically are measured in miles and chains. There are 80 chains to one mile.)

== History ==
The railway line through Fleet was built by the London & Southampton Railway, which was renamed the London and South Western Railway (LSWR) in 1839; the section between Woking and Winchfield opening on 24 September 1838, but at that time, Fleet did not have a railway station. A station, originally named Fleet Pond (after Fleet Pond) was opened in May 1847. The first station was built on the west side of Minley Road, it was renamed Fleet on 1 July 1869. In 1904 a new larger station was built on the east side when the line was increased to four tracks.

The buildings were rebuilt in 1969. As of October 2013, work was under way to replace the station buildings and deck the southern car park to provide an extra 150 spaces. The new station building and footbridge were opened in July 2014, with the former lattice footbridge removed overnight on 23/24 July.

== Services ==
South Western Railway operates all services at Fleet. The typical off-peak service per hour is:

- Two trains each way between Basingstoke and London Waterloo;
- One train each way between Portsmouth Harbour and London Waterloo.

Preceding station	National Rail	Following station
Farnborough (Main)	South Western Railway; London to Basingstoke	Winchfield
Farnborough (Main)	South Western Railway; London to Poole	Basingstoke

== Incidents ==
In May 2010, the body of a newborn baby girl was found abandoned in a rubbish bin at the station. A murder investigation was opened based upon the baby's injuries. In October 2010, the baby's then 16-year-old mother was found guilty of infanticide.
