= Brighton Hill Community School =

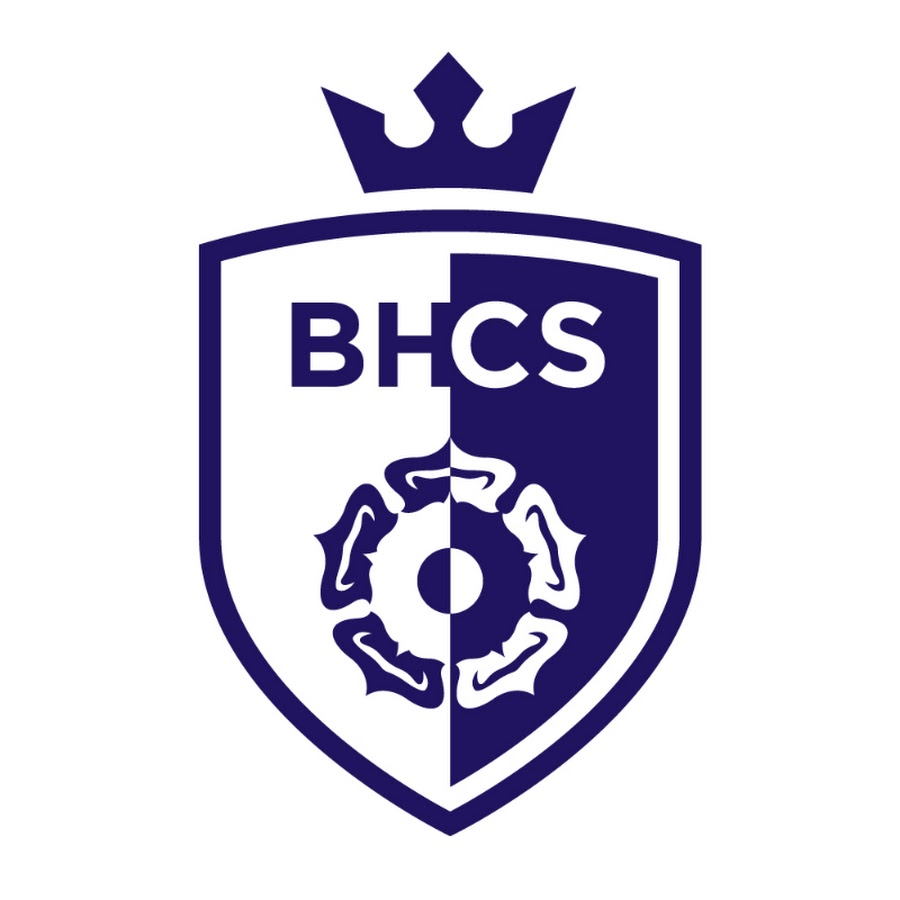

Location
- Brighton Way; Basingstoke, Hampshire, RG22 4HS; England; 51.2465°N 1.1145°W

Information
- Type: Academy
- Established: 1975
- Local authority: Hampshire
- Trust: South Farnham Educational Trust
- Department for Education URN: 149707 Tables
- Ofsted: Reports
- Headteacher: Christopher Edwards
- Gender: Coeducational
- Age: 11 to 16
- Enrolment: 1086
- Houses: Endeavour, Pioneer, Voyager, Horizon
- Colours: Navy blue and yellow
- Nickname: BHCS
- Website: http://www.brightonhill.hants.sch.uk/

Brighton Hill Community School (known locally as BHCS) is a coeducational secondary school located in Brighton Hill, Basingstoke in the county of Hampshire in the south of England.

Brighton Hill Community School is also a Training School and a Sports Specialist School.

== History ==
In 2005/2006, Brighton Hill School changed its tutoring system by introducing mixed-year tutor groups. This change led to subsequent pupil protests that were covered in the regional news.

In an Ofsted inspection, the school was praised. However, it was also criticised for poor communication with parents. In recent years, the school has constantly ranked above local and national averages. The school houses consisted of Dorney, Greenwich, Portland and Stratford until 2021; prior to that, they were named after capital cities.

In June 2008, the college was again in the local newspaper after over 200 pupils were suspended following a protest on the school field against an extension of 20 minutes to the school day, and the plans to force the entire school of 1,300 students to queue all at once. 117 children were excluded for the rest of the week. Halfway through the school summer holiday, all 117 excluded students were sent a letter stating that expelled students had had the punishment erased from their records, as discussed between the head master and the school governors.

The school is one of eight schools in the United Kingdom to become an ambassador school for the Them & Us citizenship project, as well as becoming part of the PiXL Edge program. Language learning app Memrise also has a relationship with the school, with founder Ted Cooke delivering talks to students to encourage them in their revision. One of the school's MFL classrooms subsequently became a Memrise suite, with tablets and other equipment to help with revision.

In the school's Ofsted inspection in May 2017, it achieved an overall 'good' rating for the first time in over ten years and in its 2022 inspection was rated 'outstanding' in three of the four categories while attaining a 'good' rating overall.

Previously a community school administered by Hampshire County Council, in June 2023 Brighton Hill Community School converted to academy status. The school is now sponsored by the South Farnham Educational Trust.

== Curriculum ==
The students at the school begin their GCSE subjects in year nine, which allows them to complete some GCSEs at the end of year ten and spend year eleven studying a different subject. There are some options that have double the number of lessons. The school has a one-week timetable, which includes compulsory English and Mathematics (Daily), Science and Physical Education for all students. British values and citizenship education is delivered through school assemblies, drop down days and the new 'My World' scheme sessions.

All Key Stage 3 students also study French, Geography, History, Philosophy, Ethics and Beliefs, Food Technology, Textiles, Woodwork, Music, Art, Dance and Drama. From Year Nine, students choose up to four courses to continue studying, including all of the above courses, Separate or Triple Sciences. The school also previously featured subjects such as German, Product Design, Film Studies, Electronics and Statistics in its GCSE curriculum. Curriculum Access is also offered to students with specific learning needs, in order to provide them with more time to study less subjects at GCSE.

== Departments and facilities ==
The school's curriculum is based around eight faculties; English, Mathematics, Science, Physical Education, Modern Foreign Languages (French and Spanish), Humanities (History, Geography and PEB), Expressive & Performing Arts (Dance, Drama, Art and Music) and Technology (Design Technology, Food and Nutrition, Media, Business Studies and ICT).

Brighton Hill Community School has nine ICT suites (not including other classrooms which house computers for students to use), music practice rooms with instruments, a dance and gymnastics studio, a theatre with light and sound controls, a catering room, a woodwork room, a room dedicated to the Duke of Edinburgh Award expedition and science resources.

The school's Flexible Learning Centre (FLC) was opened in September 2012 to offer support, guidance and advice to students; the school's Zone 7 class also resides there. The FLC was renamed The HUB at the beginning of the 2017-18 school year, and the school's homework club, which originally took place there, was moved to the Technology block.

== Uniform ==
Brighton Hill School's uniform consists of a daffodil-yellow shirt or blouse, black trousers, shorts or a skirt, a navy blue jumper, a navy blue blazer and a yellow, blue and green tie.

== Student organisations ==
The school operates a Student Voice, which is run by two Year 11 students, supported by the Year 10 representatives. The school Student Newspaper was formed in 2017.

The Anti-Bullying Ambassadors (ABA) were formed in 2017, being joined a year later by the mental health-focused Wellbeing Ambassadors. Both groups are stationed inside the school's Maths block, which becomes the Wellbeing Square at lunchtime. The school recently received the Silver Diana Award accreditation for its work to combat bullying.

== Headteachers ==
Christopher Edwards was appointed as the replacement of Charlie Currie and started in January 2017. Charlie Currie was head teacher from 2013-2016. Currie served as interim head teacher for two terms after the retirement of David Eyre in 2011, before becoming appointed permanent head teacher for the start of the 2013-2014 term. Other previous head teachers include Lawrie Shaw, Bill Wright and Andy Kilpatrick. Wendy Small was acting head mistress for one year, for the academic year 2009-2010.
