= Fanum House =

Office headquarters of a motoring organisation

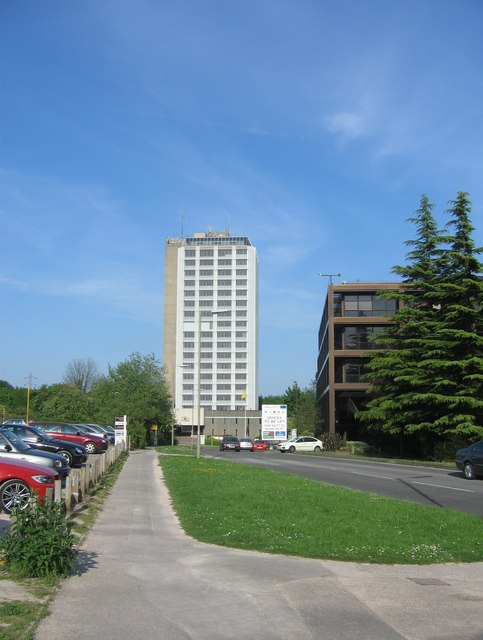
- Interactive map of the Fanum House area

General information
- Location: United Kingdom
- Coordinates: 51.2693°N 1.0710°W
- Owner: The AA
Fanum House
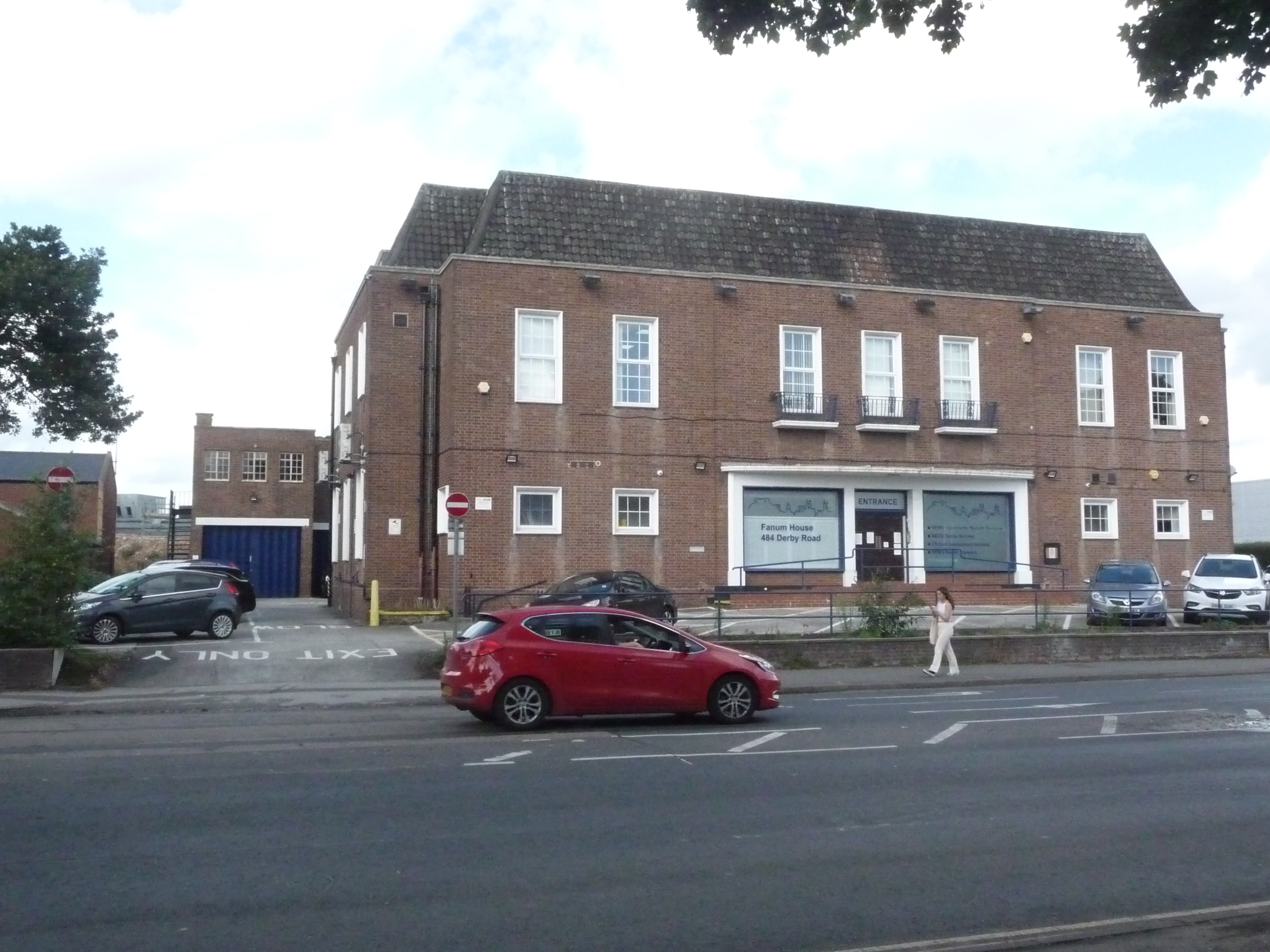
- Fanum House, Derby Road, Nottingham former AA depot, repurposed as a health centre

Fanum House is the former headquarters of the Automobile Association in Basingstoke, in the English county of Hampshire. It is one of several current and former AA buildings named "Fanum House" around the country. The original headquarters in Leicester Square, London, was also called Fanum House, "Fanum" being the call sign of the AA.

== Early years ==
The AA took advantage of 1960s government incentives to move from their London HQ to the rapidly expanding town of Basingstoke. The building was designed by Farmer and Dark. It was completed in 1972 and AA employees moved in at that point. It was officially opened by Queen Elizabeth II in 1973. It is an 83-metre (274 feet), eighteen-storey building (seventeen floors of offices plus a viewing gallery on top).

== Location ==
Fanum House is clearly visible from the M3 motorway and from the A30 approaching Basingstoke. Fanum is a Latin word for "temple", and was chosen to reflect the AA's status as the UK's premier motor breakdown company.

The Skyline Plaza development in the town centre replaced Fanum House as the tallest building in Basingstoke when it was extended from 61 metres to 85 metres, with the addition of three floors in 2009.

== Fanum House today ==
The seventeenth floor was originally executive offices with its own bar but is now the same layout as the other floors in the tower block. There was also a bar in the second-floor canteen when the building first opened, though this closed some years ago.

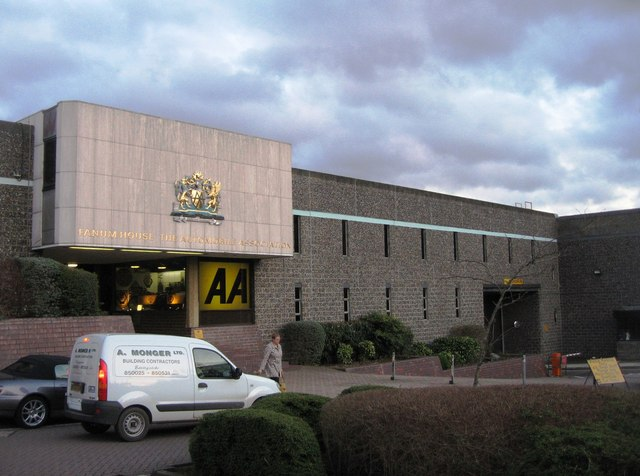
Entrance

There is no floor 1; the ground floor is known as "Upper Ground", while the basement floor (about half the size of the floors in the tower block) is known as "Lower Ground". The first floor up from Upper Ground is Floor 2. The Upper Ground floor is much larger than the floors in the tower block, with a large open-plan flat-roof office area, a coffee bar, shop, learning centre and a theatre which is used for company presentations. The building also has a large covered car park, notorious with employees for its very narrow parking spaces. This is due to the increase in the average size of cars since it was built, a common problem for older car parks in the UK. There is a covered connecting walkway from the car park to the Upper Ground floor.

Floor 10 is not regular offices, as it is mainly a power supply and building control area. Part of it is office space but only used for specific purposes. It is clearly visible from outside after dark as there is one floor which is partially in darkness.

== Future of Fanum House ==
In the mid-1990s the AA's HQ moved to the purpose-built Norfolk House on the edge of the Basingstoke ring road at the A340 junction, with the intention that Fanum House would be closed entirely. The new offices were not large enough for all the Basingstoke-based employees, resulting in both buildings operated in parallel for a period. It was ultimately Norfolk House that closed in 2002, following the takeover of the AA by Centrica in 1999, when the HQ functions moved to Farnborough. In 2005, the headquarters returned to Fanum House.

In April 2017 it was announced that the AA would be leaving Fanum House and moving to new offices in Basing View, and that Fanum House was to be demolished. However, in September 2017 it was announced that the AA would be staying at its existing home and would be spending money to develop the site. But as far as Oct 2024, they have moved to the building below. Showcasing that the building will be demolished.

== In popular culture ==
An action sequence for the MCU film Spider-Man:Brand New Day was filmed at Fanum House.
