= The Malls, Basingstoke =

The Malls
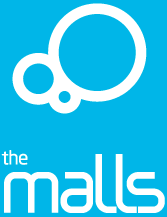

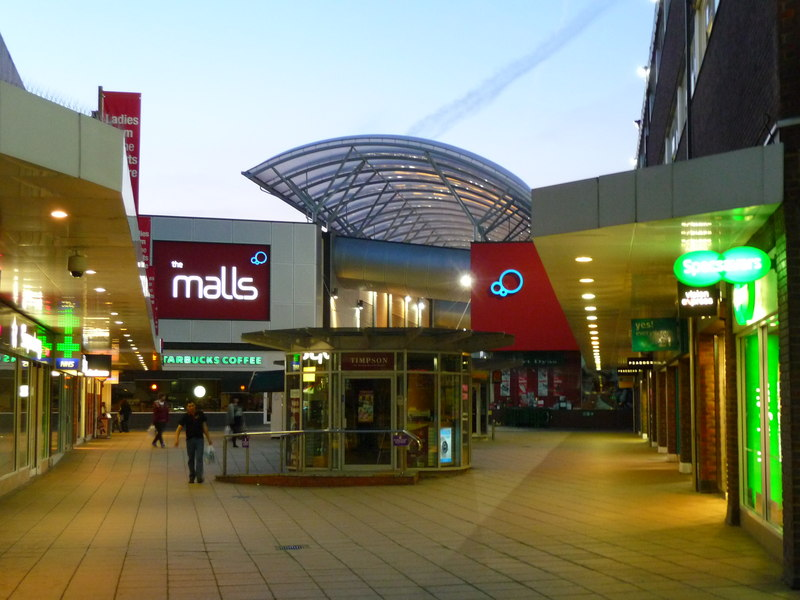
- The Malls, in 2012.
- Location: Basingstoke, England
- Coordinates: 51°16′0″N 01°05′15″W
- Opened: 1981
- Developer: Basingstoke and Deane Borough Council
- Owner: Basingstoke and Deane Borough Council
- Num. of stores: 29
- Floor area: 290,000 sq ft (27,000 m^{2})
- Floors: 1
- Website: basingstoke.gov.uk/TheMalls

The Malls, Basingstoke is a shopping centre in Basingstoke, Hampshire, England built between 1978 and 1981.

== History and development ==
Before The Malls were built, the site was occupied by a number of small residential and commercial properties and by the clothing factory of Gerrish, Ames and Simpkins. These properties were demolished in 1967 as part of a major redevelopment of central Basingstoke, which aimed at providing a large, modern shopping centre. Because of financial constraints however, what had initially been conceived as single development was divided into three parts at an early stage; Phase one, later renamed The Walks, Phase two which would become The Malls and Phase three which was eventually considered superfluous and used instead as the site for The Anvil concert hall.

Work on Phase one was completed in 1971, by which time it was clear that finances were insufficient to support further building work on the centre. Phase two and three were postponed and the cleared sites were temporarily grassed over.

By 1976 the financial situation had improved and after protracted negotiations with prospective tenants, work on Phase two began in 1978. As was originally conceived, this second phase would integrate seamlessly with the initial phase so that as far as shoppers were concerned, the shopping centre would be a single unit. The design for Phase two was by architects Llewelyn, Davis, Weeks.

As work progressed on Phase two, the new names for the two parts of the centre were announced, both parts coming under the overall title of The Basingstoke Centre. The style and decor of both parts at this time was wholly unified even though the two sites were managed and leased by separate and completely independent companies. The Malls were opened in 1981 with five major stores and a further 24 smaller units.

Since this time, The Malls have seen only minor changes and improvements whilst The Walks have been upgraded dramatically, firstly having walkways roofed over and totally refurbished as part of £12M improvement scheme in 1987 and then undergoing a major rebuild and extension in 1998 to transform The Walks into Festival Place.

A survey in 1999 (prior to the opening of Festival Place) ranked The Malls as one of the worst retail centres in the country, placing it 186th out of the 200 shopping centres included.

== Recent Developments ==
The Borough Council turned their focus on trying to find a way to bring substantial improvements to the centre, but this work was constrained by high occupancy levels and the number of sitting tenants on very long lets.

In 2004, the leasehold was purchased by the St Modwen development group in partnership with Kuwait property investment company Salhia Real Estate.

In 2008, the first details of the planned makeover for The Malls were released, with plans to renovate the buildings. Work begun in 2010 to refurbish The Malls, which were expected to finish July 2011 but ended up being finished in November of that year. The centre was officially relaunched on 20 November 2011 by Camilla Dallerup.
