= Hook railway station =

Railway station in Hampshire, England

Coordinates: 51.2800°N 0.9616°W

Hook
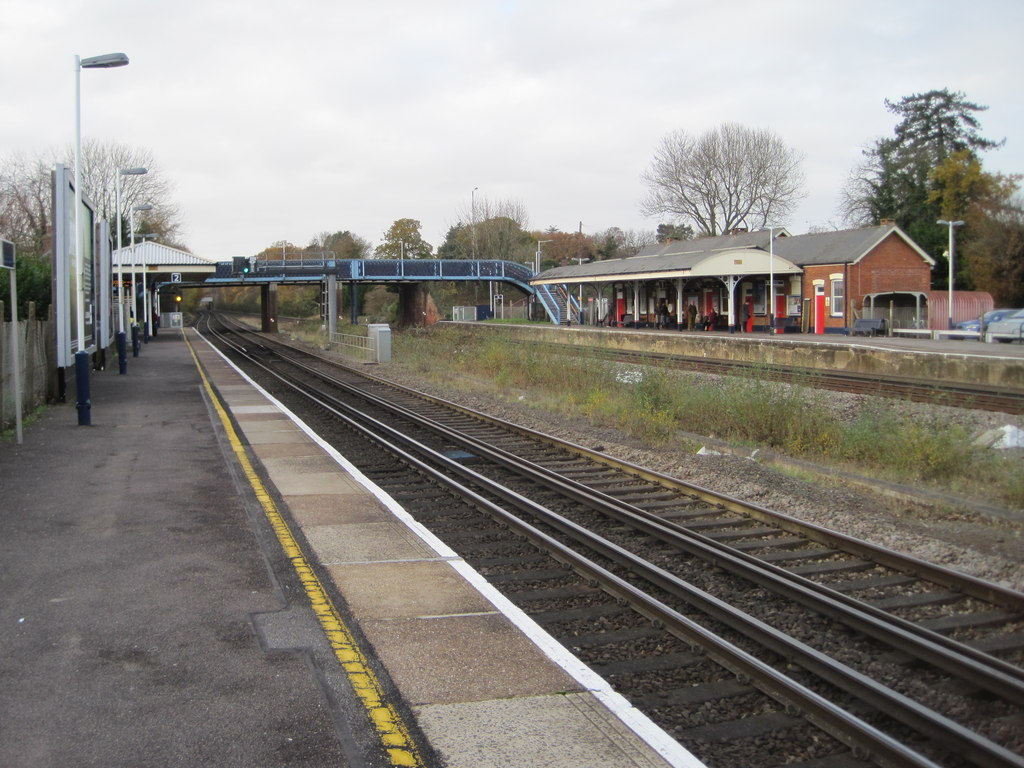
- Platforms with station building on the right

General information
- Location: Hook, District of Hart; England
- Grid reference: SU725539
- Managed by: South Western Railway
- Platforms: 2
- Tracks: 4

Other information
- Station code: HOK
- Classification: DfT category D

History
- Opened: 2 July 1883; 142 years ago

Passengers
- 2020/21: ▼0.150 million
- 2021/22: ▲0.318 million
- 2022/23: ▲0.396 million
- 2023/24: ▲0.435 million
- 2024/25: ▲0.488 million
Location
Notes
- Passenger statistics from the Office of Rail and Road

Hook railway station serves the large village of Hook and surrounding villages in Hampshire, southern England. it has two platforms, which serve the outer pair of tracks. The centre pair of tracks has no platforms, and is used by services that do not call at Hook.

It is 42 miles 13 chains (67.9 km) down the main line from London Waterloo (Note: Railways in the United Kingdom historically are measured in miles and chains. There are 80 chains to one mile.) and is between Winchfield and Basingstoke. Trains typically run every 30 minutes in each direction between Waterloo and Basingstoke.

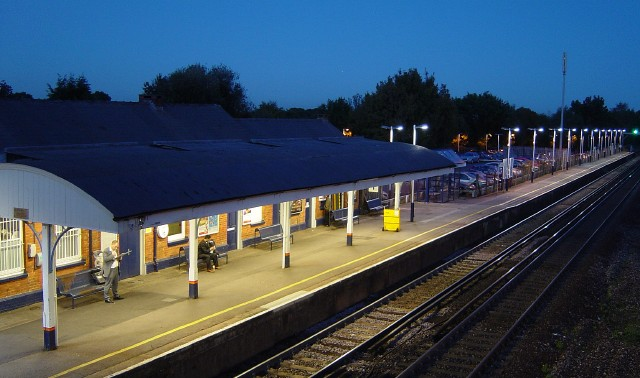
The eastbound platform at night

== History ==
The railway through Hook was built in 1839, but Hook railway station did not open until 1883, after a lengthy campaign by local landowners. The London and South Western Railway had it built in its typical style. It was built with two platforms and two tracks, and was expanded to four platforms and tracks in 1901–04 when the London to Basingstoke line was quadrupled. The middle island platform was removed in about the 1960s.

In 1940, a bomb landed on the tracks a short distance from the station. Six soldiers were ordered to dispose of the bomb, to prevent it from damaging the tracks. The bomb exploded, killing the six soldiers and injuring their sergeant. A group of local people has arranged to have a memorial plaque to them displayed in the station.

== Notes ==
Preceding station	National Rail	Following station
Winchfield	South Western Railway; London Waterloo – Weymouth	Basingstoke
