= Hatch Warren =

Area in Basingstoke, Hampshire, England

Coordinates: 51°14′N 1°7′W

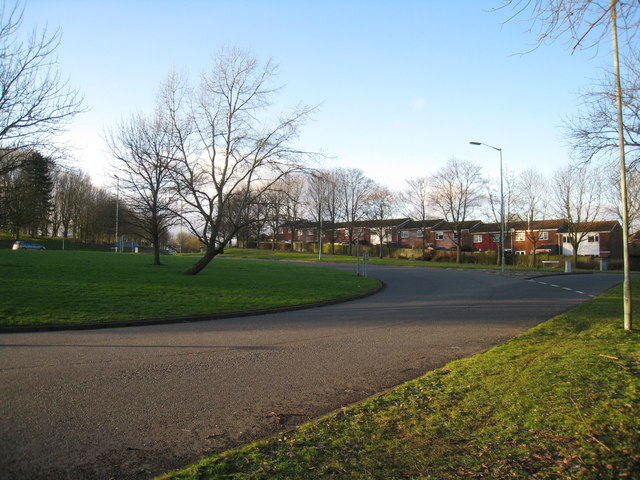
Hatch Warren Lane roundabout

Hatch Warren is a district and ward of Basingstoke in Hampshire, England. The population of the appropriate ward called Hatch Warren and Beggarwood was 9,284 at the 2011 Census. It is situated west of the town centre and neighbouring housing estates include Kempshott and Brighton Hill. It is primarily served by Brighton Hill Community School (a secondary school), one Primary school, St Marks and a junior school, Hatch Warren.

It lies within the Hatch Warren & Beggarwood ward of Basingstoke and Deane Borough Council.

Hatch Warren shares a Newsletter, the Rabbiter, with Beggarwood and Kempshott Park, and has a small retail park, which includes a Sainsbury's supermarket and petrol station, as well as Argos, Lidl, American Golf, Pets at Home, Dreams and B&M. It also has a pub named The Portsmouth Arms. The pub was due to open in 1996, but was destroyed by arson; the Portsmouth Arms did however open a year later.

There is a Community Centre in Hatch Warren, It is used by a Youth Club, After-school activity Group as well as the local Scouting group.
