= Brighton Hill =

Coordinates: 51.250058°N 1.111198°W

- Location within Hampshire
- OS grid reference: SU6212950474
- District: Basingstoke and Deane
- Shire county: Hampshire
- Region: South East
- Country: England
- Sovereign state: United Kingdom
- Post town: Basingstoke
- Postcode district: RG22 4
- Dialling code: 01256
- Police: Hampshire and Isle of Wight
- Fire: Hampshire and Isle of Wight
- Ambulance: South Central
- UK Parliament: Basingstoke

Brighton Hill is a district of Basingstoke, England, that was formed around 1970 as part of the Town Centre Development Plan. The area is bounded to the west by the newer housing estate of Hatch Warren and by the A30. To the east of Brighton Hill, the Viables Industrial Estate and Cranbourne area. The area to the east is a lot older than Brighton Hill itself. The M3 motorway runs in a straight line to the south of the area, directly next to the southern ebb of Brighton Hill, which sometimes is referred to as Old Hatchwarren.

== Origin of the name ==
The earliest mention of the Brighton Hill name found so far was on a map dated 1877. However, this seems to relate to a cottage or some other building, situated just over halfway between Hatch Warren Farm (at the rear of the 'Portsmouth Arms' public house) and where the then Hatch Warren Lane and Winchester Road (now the A30) joined at a crossroads. An excerpt of map is shown here: http://www.british-history.ac.uk/mapsheet.aspx?compid=55119&sheetid=3770&ox=2671&oy=2821&zm=1&czm=1&x=363&y=235

The place marked as Brighton Hill on the 1877 map would roughly at the rear of Hatchwarren School, at the junction between the footpaths. As the map shows, one such footpath was the original Hatch Warren Lane in the area, the other links Brighton Hill with Hatch Warren.

== Original layout ==
Before the estate was built, the area was almost entirely farmland. The current Hatchwarren Lane, and Beggarwood Lane runs on the site of the original country lanes, which crossed the Basingstoke and Alton Light Railway where Viables Roundabout is today. A section of track lies in the middle of the roundabout, as a permanent reminder of the railway. Cranbourne Lane carried on into Basingstoke Town Centre, passing many agricultural nurseries on the way. At the railway crossing, there was a junction with a road, now known as The Harrow Way but in times gone by, The Basingstoke Bypass. This road stretched from the junction with the road to Alton (now A339) from Hackwood Lane, to the Winchester Road (A30). The A30 route from Basingstoke Town Centre runs to a very similar alignment today, the main difference being a diversion behind Brighton Hill Community School, to allow for building of a retail park. The only real housing in the area was in a street known as Cumberland Avenue, at the time completely surrounded by fields. The road exists today and is a very unusual place in Brighton Hill.

The Willis Museum features many articles relating to the history of Basingstoke and its suburbs; visit the website at: https://web.archive.org/web/20071209194451/http://www3.hants.gov.uk/museum/willis-museum/local-studies-willis.htm .

== Housing growth ==
The first section of Brighton Hill to be completed was the Quilter Road area, with much of the ex — council housing from Haydn Road in the west, to Wagner Close in the east following soon after. (Almost all the streets in Brighton Hill are named after composers and musicians). Part of this development was a number of medium-sized tower blocks, namely in Verdi Close, Mozart Close and Schubert Road. These had been demolished by the early 1990s and replaced with more modern houses. One large development was the private sector housing, stretching from Handel Close in the west, to Porter Road to the east. This was completed by the mid 1970s and filled in all the former farmland in the Hatchwarren Lane/Harrow Way/Winchester Road square. The remainder of the space adjacent to Winchester Road was occupied by Brighton Hill School — now known as Brighton Hill Community College. Many new roads were constructed, Brighton Way and Gershwin Road being very important feeder roads to the new housing. It is important not to forget the development on the south west side of the estate, consisting of Bach Close and Novello Close.

Later additions, largely retaining the musician pattern, included the Guinness Trust development, from Beecham Berry in the south to Boyce Close and Copland Close in the north. This development filled more of the gaps left, with Boyce Close and Copland Close in quite close proximity to the A30 Winchester Road. Tallis Gardens was created from part of the Chalk Ridge Primary School playing field in around 1990, and at a similar time a housing development took place on Gershwin Road, in addition to a new school, Hatchwarren Junior and Infant School. Numerous small developments were also added, such as Vivaldi Close and Gershwin Court, a sheltered housing area.

== Education ==
Brighton Hill was eventually provided with no less than one secondary school, and four [primary] schools. The secondary school is now known as Brighton Hill Community School, opening in 1975 and the primary schools are Manorfield School, Chalk Ridge School and Hatchwarren School. Beechdown School which was largely destroyed by fire in November 2000, and now remains closed. The area has now been redeveloped with housing, Brighton Hill pre-School uses part of what remained from the old Beechdown School. Queen Mary's College is around a 20-minute walk from Brighton Hill, nearby to the Town Centre. Transport links have always been provided for those in further education. The town's technical college is also near to Basingstoke Town Centre.

== Leisure and entertainment ==
One very popular attraction was the Davies Snooker Centre, which was at first floor level in the place now occupied by the Girlzone Gym. This become known as Premiers, and then as Cosys before finally closing. Eric Bristow is reputed to have practiced his skills at the DSC on occasion. While under the Premiers label, a large Scalextric track was built, with regulars racing the model cars round the vast track. This was featured in the Basingstoke Gazette when new.

For those seeking other forms of leisure, Brighton Hill was supplied with plentiful green spaces and open areas. There is a lot of land used as playing fields in the area. An adventure playground exists in the large green area near the M3 motorway, at the southern end of Hatchwarren Lane. Many playgrounds were provided in residential areas, but most have been removed amid safety fears.

Viables Craft Centre is near to the estate, with regular runnings on the miniature railway line and craft fairs.

== Brighton Hill Centre and retail areas ==
Brighton Hill Centre was built along with much of the housing development in the area. This consisted of shops and a supermarket, along with the Pig and Whistle public house. Plentiful car parking was provided, and in years gone by Brighton Hill Centre had a traditional greengrocer and a butcher's shop, a council office and the Unwins off licence. These are now long gone. When the supermarket was first opened, Sainsbury's traded there, closing the store when the Hatch Warren branch opened in 1988.

A Post Office had always been provided at Brighton Hill Centre until its closure in June 2008.

Public toilets were provided adjacent to the doctors surgery, but these fell into disrepair and were taken out of use in the late 1980s. At present there are only eleven public conveniences in the Basingstoke and Deane area, and a considerable number are outside of the town.

Much retail development has taken around the estate, with the area by Brighton Hill Roundabout seeing much change.

== Public transport ==
Bus transport for many years was provided by the National Bus Company, under the Hampshire Bus name. Long ago public transport along the A30 was provided by the Hants and Dorset bus company, but this predates much development in the area. After the privatisation of the bus industry, services are run in the area by Stagecoach South.

Former notable bus routes were the 39, 40, 50 and 59, although much of this network was considerably altered in the year 2000. Bus routes for the estate are now served by routes 1 and 12, the former serving Brighton Hill at a twelve minute frequency for most of the time. Exceptions are on Sundays/Bank Holidays and in evenings. Route 12 operates hourly. Of the two routes, route 1 is seen as the more popular route for the Town Centre, operating direct via Winchester Road, whereas the 12 runs via Cranbourne before reaching the Town Centre.

== Decline ==
After the closure of the local supermarket the shopping precinct became run down and vandalised. Some shops closed down over this period. Many residents did not feel safe using the area, particularly at night.

== All change ==
In the early 2000s there were rumours of a complete overhaul of the Brighton Hill Centre, and surrounding areas. Many residents were sceptical and morale at the time was low. For what seemed like a very long time, Brighton Hill was missing out on many basic features, one example is the lack of cashpoint in the area, the nearest being around two miles away. Provisions in the convenience stores in the area were a lot more expensive than those in the supermarket, particularly affecting the elderly and disabled who found it harder to travel further than the estate. The general atmosphere in the area did not do much to lift residents' spirits at this stage in time.

However, in 2002 the demolition of the former supermarket began. This involved digging up car parking and also demolition of the Pig and Whistle public house, by this time closed. The work also involved filling in of 'subways' under roads in the immediate area and new crossings provided. This was as the former subways were often inhabited by youths and were seen by residents as intimidating places. Additional footpaths were built, particularly in the green area behind the precinct and also a new playground built at a higher level than the previous one. Bus stops nearby were lengthened to accommodate two buses easily and two new roundabouts constructed, adding to the 'Doughnut City' label Basingstoke has already. Much of the site has been taken over by the Asda supermarket and associated parking spaces.

== Local government ==
Despite Basingstoke having a Conservative MP, Maria Miller, Brighton Hill is a Liberal Democrat and Labour-run ward. The ward is split into two areas, Brighton Hill South and Brighton Hill North. The Southern part of the ward has John Barnes (Liberal Democrat) and David Eyre (Labour) as local councillor. The North part of the ward has Brian Gurden (Liberal Democrat) and Carolyn Wooldridge (Labour) as local councillor. The boundary is generally along Quilter Road and Brighton Way.

Links to local government figures are provided below:

https://web.archive.org/web/20071030125320/http://www.mariamiller.co.uk/type2.asp?id=59&type=2 – the page for Maria Miller MP

https://web.archive.org/web/20070823193629/http://councillor.basingstoke.gov.uk/JohnBarnes/ — the page for Cllr Barnes

https://web.archive.org/web/20120513055033/http://councillor.basingstoke.gov.uk/briangurden — the page for Cllr Gurden

== Notable people ==
- Ashna Rabheru, actress
