= Basingstoke =

Town in Hampshire, England

Coordinates: 51.2667°N 1.0876°W

- Town
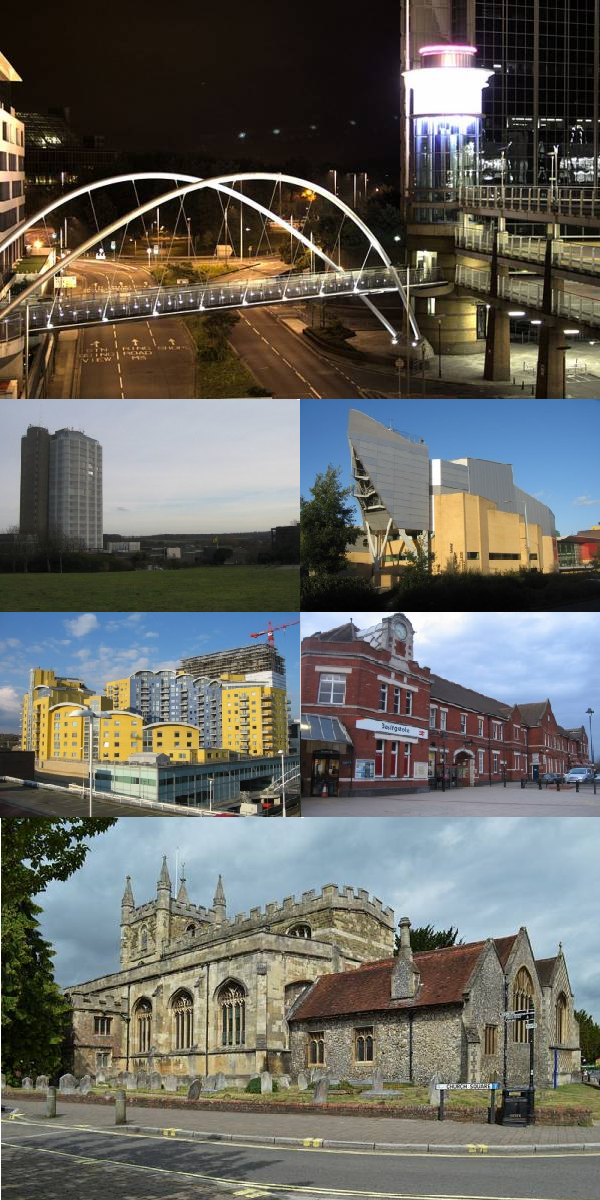
- Clockwise from top: Town centre viewed from Churchill Way at night, The Anvil theatre, Basingstoke railway station, St Michael's Church, high-rise flats in Crown Heights and the AA Building (Fanum House)

- Location within Hampshire
- Population: 107,642
- OS grid reference: SU637523
- District: Basingstoke and Deane
- Shire county: Hampshire
- Region: South East
- Country: England
- Sovereign state: United Kingdom
- Post town: BASINGSTOKE
- Postcode district: RG21–RG24
- Dialling code: 01256
- Police: Hampshire and Isle of Wight
- Fire: Hampshire and Isle of Wight
- Ambulance: South Central
- UK Parliament: Basingstoke
- Website: basingstoke.gov.uk

Basingstoke (/ˈbeɪzɪŋstoʊk/ BAY-zing-stohk) is a town in Hampshire, situated in south-central England across a valley at the source of the River Loddon on the western edge of the North Downs. It is the largest settlement in Hampshire without city status. It is located 30 miles (48 km) north-east of Southampton, 48 miles (77 km) south-west of London, 27 miles (43 km) west of Guildford, 22 miles (35 km) south of Reading and 20 miles (32 km) north-east of the county town and former capital Winchester. According to the 2021 population estimate, the town had a population of 107,642. (Note: In 2012, the town proper had a population of 84,275, but this does not include the large suburban villages of Chineham, Old Basing or Lychpit, which are now considered as outer suburbs of the town.) It is part of the borough of Basingstoke and Deane and part of the parliamentary constituency of Basingstoke.

Basingstoke is an old market town and was mentioned in Domesday Book. At the start of the Second World War, the population was little more than 13,000, and it remained a small market town until the early 1960s. It still has a regular market, but is now larger than Hampshire County Council's definition of a market town.

Basingstoke became an important economic centre during the Second World War. It expanded further in the mid-1960s as a result of an agreement between London County Council and Hampshire County Council. It was developed rapidly along with various other towns in the United Kingdom, in order to accommodate part of the London 'overspill' as perceived under the Greater London Plan in 1944.

It now houses the UK headquarters of Motorola, The Automobile Association, De La Rue, Sun Life Financial, ST Ericsson, Barracuda Networks, Eli Lilly and Company, FCB Halesway part of FCB, BNP Paribas Leasing Solutions (the leasing arm of BNP Paribas in the UK) and Sony Professional Solutions. It is also the location of the European headquarters of the TaylorMade Golf Company. Other industries include IT, telecommunications, insurance and electronics.

== Etymology ==
The name Basingstoke (A.D 990; Embasinga stocæ, Domesday; Basingestoches) is believed to have been derived from the town's position as the outlying, western settlement of Basa's people. (Note: The List of generic forms in British place names shows a toponymic interpretation of the various Old English elements within the names Basing and Basingstoke. Bas is taken to be from the personal name 'Basa', ingas as 'people of' and stoc as 'dependent farmstead' or 'secondary settlement'.) Basing, now Old Basing, a village 2 miles (3 km) to the east, is thought to have the same etymology, and was the original Anglo-Saxon settlement of the people – Basingas – led by a tribal chief called Basa. Basing remained the main settlement until changes in the local church moved the religious base from St Mary's Church, Basing, to the church in Basingstoke.

== History ==
=== Early settlements ===
A Neolithic campsite of around 3000 BC beside a spring on the west of the town is the earliest known human settlement here, but the Willis Museum has flint implements and axes from nearby fields that date back to Palæolithic times. The hillfort at Winklebury (2 miles (3 km) west of the town centre), known locally as Winklebury Camp or Winklebury Ring dates from the Iron Age and there are remains of several other earthworks around Basingstoke, including a long barrow near Down Grange. The site of Winklebury camp was home to Fort Hill Community School (now closed). Nearby, to the west, Roman Road marks the course of a Roman road that ran from Winchester to Silchester. Further to the east, another Roman road ran from Chichester through the outlying villages of Upton Grey and Mapledurwell. The Harrow Way is an Iron-age ancient route that runs to the south of the town. The first recorded historical event in the area was the defeat of King Æthelred of Wessex and his brother Alfred the Great at Old Basing by the Danes in 871.

=== Market town ===
Basingstoke is recorded as a weekly market site in the Domesday Book, in 1086, and has held a regular Wednesday market since 1214. During the Civil War, and the siege of Basing House between 1643 and 1645, the town played host to large numbers of Parliamentarians. During this time, St. Michael's Church was damaged whilst being used as an explosive store and lead was stripped from the roof of the Chapel of the Holy Ghost, Basingstoke leading to its eventual ruin. It had been incorporated in 1524, but was effectively out of use after the Civil War. The 17th century saw serious damage to much of the town and its churches, because of the great fires of 1601 and 1656. Oliver Cromwell is thought to have stayed here towards the end of the siege of Basing House, and wrote a letter to the Speaker of the House of Commons addressed from Basingstoke.

The cloth industry appears to have been important in the development of the town until the 17th century, along with malting. Brewing became important during the 18th and 19th centuries, and the oldest and most successful brewery was May's Brewery, established by Thomas and William May in 1750 in Brook Street.

=== Victorian history ===
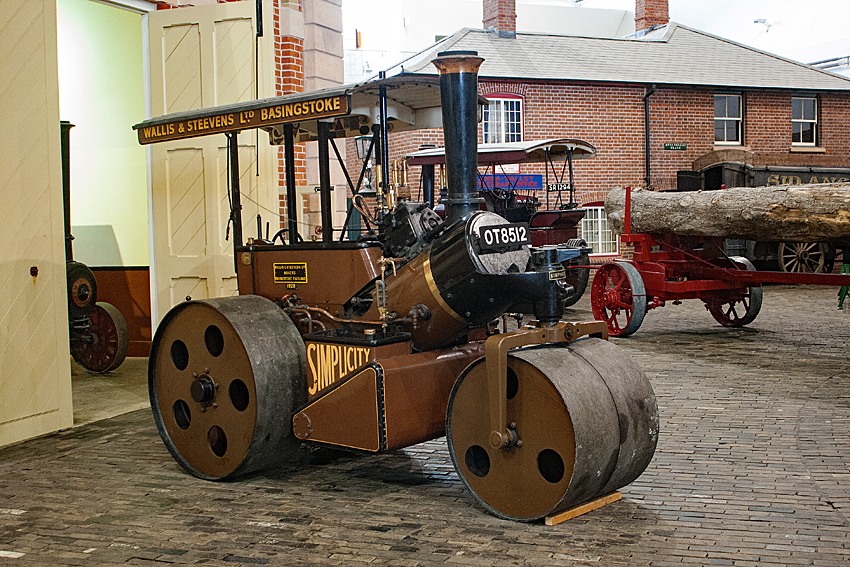
A Wallis & Steevens Simplicity steam roller

The London and South Western Railway arrived in 1839 from London and, within a year, it was extended to Winchester and Southampton. In 1848, a rival company, sponsored by the Great Western Railway built a branch from Reading. In 1854, a line was built to Salisbury by the London and South Western. In the 19th century, Basingstoke began to move into industrial manufacture; Wallis and Haslam (later Wallis & Steevens) began producing agricultural equipment including threshing machines in the 1850s, moving into the production of stationary steam engines in the 1860s and then traction engines in the 1870s.

Two traders who opened their first shops within a year of each other in the town, went on to become household names nationally: Thomas Burberry in 1856 and Alfred Milward in 1857. Burberry became famous after he invented Gabardine and Milward founded the Milwards chain of shoe shops, which could be found on almost every high street until the 1980s.

John May, a member of the brewery family, was several times mayor of the town. A benefactor to the town, he paid for the building of a drill hall in Sarum Hill for the use of the Hampshire Volunteers (later used as a cinema and then a furniture shop) and a wing for the Cottage Hospital in Hackwood Road. The drill hall was opened in 1885 and also used for concerts and exhibitions. He also bought a piece of open space that was about to be sold for housing and let it at a low rent to the Basingstoke Cricket Club. This cricket ground is still in use and is called May's Bounty.

Ordinary citizens were said to be shocked by the emotive, evangelical tactics of the Salvation Army when they arrived in the town in 1880, but the reaction from those employed by the breweries or within the licensed trade quickly grew more openly hostile. Violent clashes became a regular occurrence. (Note: In summarising to Magistrates at the trial of those members of the public said to have rioted against the Salvationists, defence counsel stated that "Until this body known as the Salvation Army was formed here, the number of summonses which had come before the Magistrates was comparatively unknown. They now had a large number of assault cases to hear. The army perfectly well knew that their conduct was leading to disturbances in the town." The case against the defendants was dismissed.) On Sunday 27 March 1881, troops were called upon to break up the conflict after the Mayor had read the Riot Act. The riot and its causes led to questions in Parliament and a period of notoriety for the town. The town was described as "Barbarous Basingstoke" by one London newspaper in 1882 but, by March 1882, the disturbances were dying down.

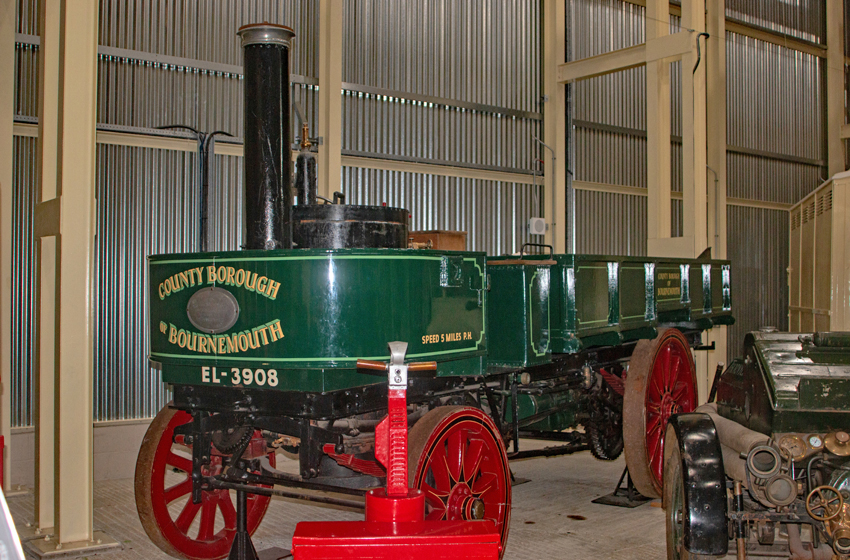
A 1902 Thornycroft steam lorry, in the Milestones Museum

In 1898, John Isaac Thornycroft began production of steam-powered lorries in the town and Thornycroft's quickly grew to become the town's largest employer.

=== Recent history ===
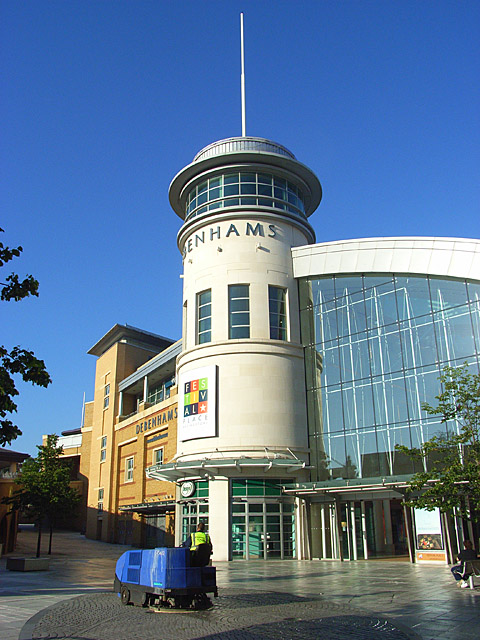
Festival Place shopping centre in August 2007

Basingstoke suffered very little bomb damage during the Second World War. A stick of German bombs did fall in the Church Square area on 16 August 1940. On the same day, bombs destroyed part of a row of houses in Burgess Road; six people were killed in the raid. Overall, 13 civilians died from enemy action during the war in the town. After the war, the town had a population of 25,000.

As part of the London Overspill plan, along with places such as Ashford and Swindon, Basingstoke was rapidly developed in the late 1960s as an expanded town, in similar fashion to Milton Keynes. As the population increased, the town produced more figures of national importance, such as the art critic Waldemar Januszczak and the actress Elizabeth Hurley. Many office blocks and large estates were built, as well as a ring road. The shopping centre was built in phases. The first phase was completed by the 1970s and was later covered in the 1980s, and was known as The Walks. The second phase was completed by the early 1980s, and became The Malls. The third phase was abandoned and the site was later used to build the Anvil concert hall. The central part of the shopping centre was rebuilt in 2002 and reopened as Festival Place. This has brought a dramatic improvement to shoppers' opinions of the town centre.

== Geography ==
Situated in a valley through the Hampshire Downs at an average elevation of 88 metres (289 ft), Basingstoke is a major interchange between Reading, Newbury, Andover, Winchester and Alton. It lies on the natural trade route between the south-west of England and London. The area had been something of an interchange even in ancient times. It had been cut by a Roman roadway that ran from north-east to south-west, from Silchester towards Salisbury (Sorbiodunum), and by another Roman road that linked Silchester (Calleva Atrebatum) in the north with Winchester (Venta Belgarum) to the south. These cross-cutting highways, along with the good agricultural land hereabouts, account for the many Roman villas in the area, mostly put up by Romanized native nobility. Even more ancient was the Harrow Way, a Neolithic trackway, possibly associated with the ancient tin trade, that crossed all of southern England from west to east, from Cornwall to Kent, passing right through Andover and Basingstoke.

=== Physical geography and geology ===
Basingstoke has no single boundary that encompasses all the areas contiguous to its development. The unparished area of the town represents its bulk, but several areas popularly considered part of the town are separate parishes, namely Chineham, Rooksdown, and parts of Old Basing and Lychpit. The unparished area includes Worting, which was previously a separate village and parish, extending beyond Roman Road and Old Kempshott Lane, which might otherwise be considered the town's 'natural' western extremity.

Basingstoke is situated on a bed of cretaceous upper chalk with small areas of clayey and loamy soil, inset with combined clay and flint patches. Loam and alluvium recent and pleistocene sediments line the bed of the river Loddon. A narrow line of tertiary Reading beds run diagonally from the north-west to the south-east along a line from Sherborne St John through Popley, Daneshill and the north part of Basing. To the north of this line, encompassing the areas of Chineham and Pyotts Hill, is London clay, which has in the past allowed excavation for high quality brick and tile manufacture.

=== Divisions and suburbs ===
Basingstoke's expansion has absorbed much surrounding farmland and scattered housing, transforming it into housing estates or local districts. Many of these new estates are designed as almost self-contained communities, such as Lychpit, Chineham, Popley, Winklebury, Oakridge, Kempshott, Brighton Hill, Viables, South Ham, Black Dam, Buckskin and South Ham Extension and Hatch Warren. The M3 acts as a buffer zone to the south of the town, and the South West Main Line constrains the western expansion, with a green belt to the north and north-east. The villages of Cliddesden, Dummer, Sherborne St John and Oakley, although being very close to the town limits, are distinct parishes. Popley, Hatch Warren and Beggarwood saw rapid growth in housing in the mid to late 2000s.

=== Demography ===
The population of Basingstoke increased from around 2,500 in 1801 to over 52,000 in 1971; the most significant growth occurring during the latter half of the 20th century. The borough of Basingstoke was merged with other local districts in 1974 to form the borough of Basingstoke and Deane; census data from that point covers the whole borough.

Figures published for the UK census in 2011 for the Borough of Basingstoke and Deane give a population of 167,799 and a population density of 2.7 persons per hectare—only about half the national figure. The number of women slightly exceeded that of men and a slight increase in the percentage of residents over 65 was also noted. Among other findings in 2001 were that 74.33% felt they were in good health, 50.98% were economically active full-time employees (over 10% higher than the national average) and 48.73% were buying their property with a mortgage or loan (almost 10% higher than the national average). Amongst the working population, 64.2% travelled less than 10 kilometres (6.2 mi) to work. The biggest percentage of employees, 17.67%, worked in real estate, renting and business activities.

== Governance ==
Basingstoke is part of a two-tier local government structure and returns county councillors to Hampshire County Council. It is the third largest settlement in the ceremonial county, but when the cities of Southampton and Portsmouth attained unitary authority status in 1998, Basingstoke became the largest settlement in the county administered by the county council.

Basingstoke and Deane Borough Council is the lower-tier local authority for the town, and has its offices in the town centre. Elections to the council take place in three out of every four years.

Under the town twinning scheme, the local council have twinned Basingstoke with Alençon in France, Braine-l'Alleud in Belgium and Euskirchen in Germany.

== Facilities ==
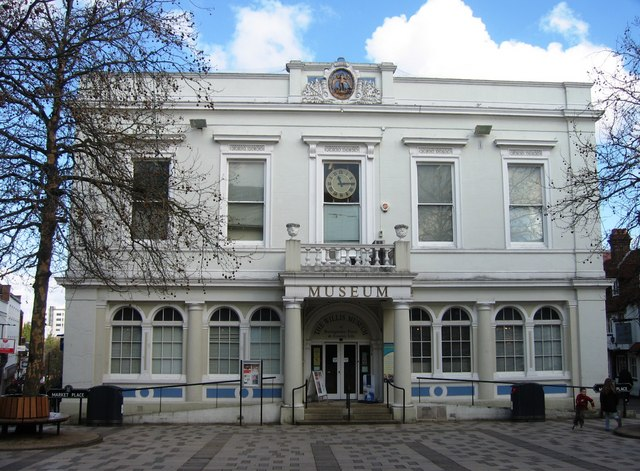
The former town hall, now the Willis Museum

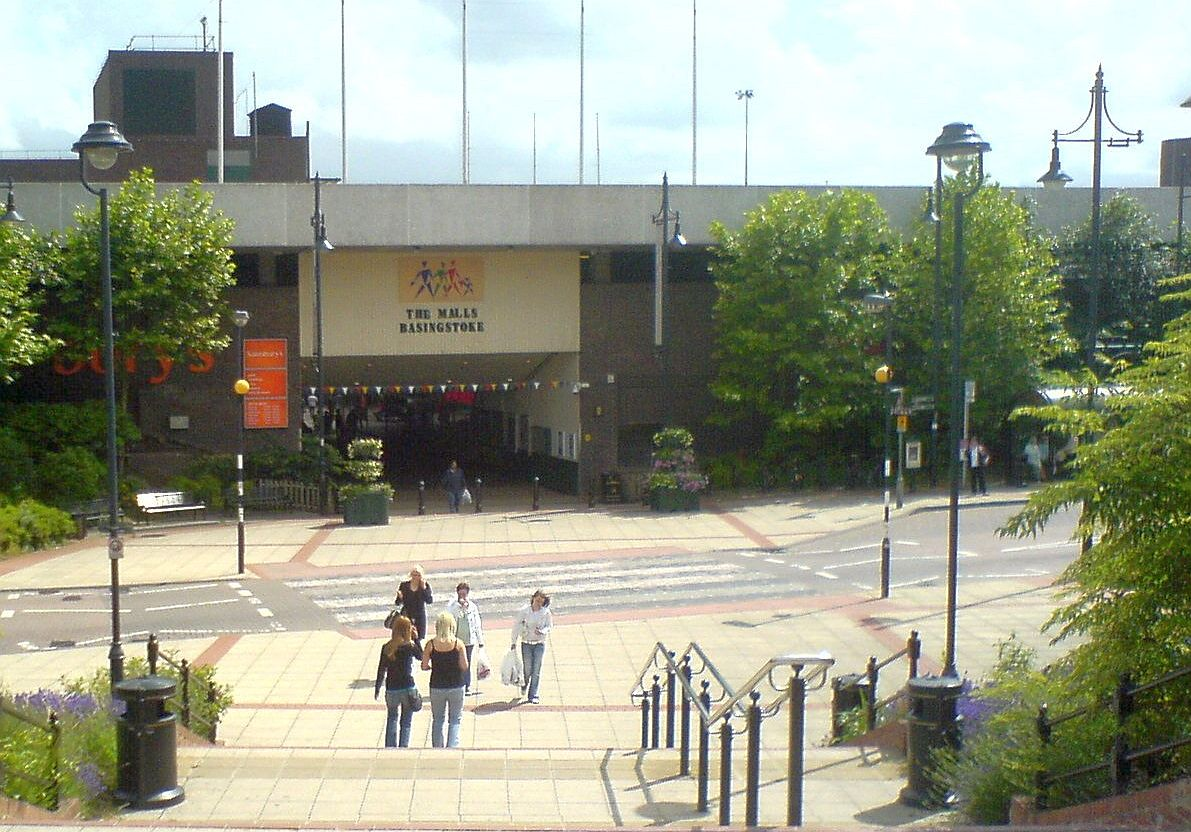
View of The Malls from Basingstoke railway station before the 2011 refurbishment

The Top of Town is the historic heart of Basingstoke, housing the Willis Museum in the former Town Hall building (rebuilt 1832) as well as several locally run shops and the market place.

Basingstoke is home to three theatrical organisations: the Haymarket, which is situated in the former Corn Exchange, The Anvil, which is near to the railway station, and the Proteus Creation Space situated in the May's Bounty area at the top of the town, which is a community arts centre and theatre and houses the Proteus Theatre Company.

The Willis Museum was founded and directed by Alderman George W. Willis, a local clocksmith, who served as Mayor of Basingstoke in 1923–24. Willis established the museum in 1931 with much public support, and built its holdings up into a major collection on local history, with a particularly extensive collection of prehistoric implements and of antique clocks and watches. His association with the expanding museum continued for forty years. The museum's central location today is where Jane Austen and her sister used to go to dances; a statue of Jane Austen was installed outside the museum in 2017, on the 200th anniversary of her death. Although ostensibly set in Hertford, Austen's novel Pride and Prejudice, written in 1797, is thought to have been based on her view of Basingstoke society two centuries ago.

The major shopping area is Festival Place, which opened in October 2002. Festival Place gave a huge boost to the town centre, transforming and replacing what was the former The Walks shopping centre and the New Market Square. Aside from a wide range of shops, there is also a range of cafés and restaurants as well as a large multiscreen Vue cinema (formerly Ster Century from Festival Place's opening until their takeover in 2005; the pre-existing Vue in the Leisure Park was sold to Odeon).

The Malls is a shopping area linked by a gateway entrance to the rail station. It had declined since the opening of Festival Place and the closure of its Allders department store. The leasehold was purchased in 2004 by the St Modwen development group, in partnership with the Kuwait property investment company Salhia Real Estate, with provision for redevelopment The redevelopment of The Malls started in late 2010. A clear roof canopy was installed to protect the Malls from bad weather while still allowing natural light and air in. The Malls has been repaved and new street furniture installed. The redevelopment was completed in the last quarter of 2011, carried out by Wates Group using a variety of subcontractors.

A large Waitrose store is located near the station. It was built in November 2015 as part of the redevelopment of Basing View. The John Lewis at Home store at Basing View closed in 2021 due to financial losses worsened by the COVID-19 pandemic and a shift toward online shopping, as part of a company-wide closure of loss-making stores.

The town's nightlife is split between the new Festival Square and the traditional hostelries at the Top of Town, with a few local community pubs outside the central area. The town has four nightclubs: two in the town itself, one on the east side and one 2 miles (3.2 km) out to the west.

The Basingstoke Sports Centre is located in Portchester Square. The sports centre has a subterranean swimming pool, sauna, jacuzzi and steam room. Above ground there is a gym, aerobics studios, squash courts and main hall. There is also an Ofsted-registered crèche.

=== Sport and leisure ===
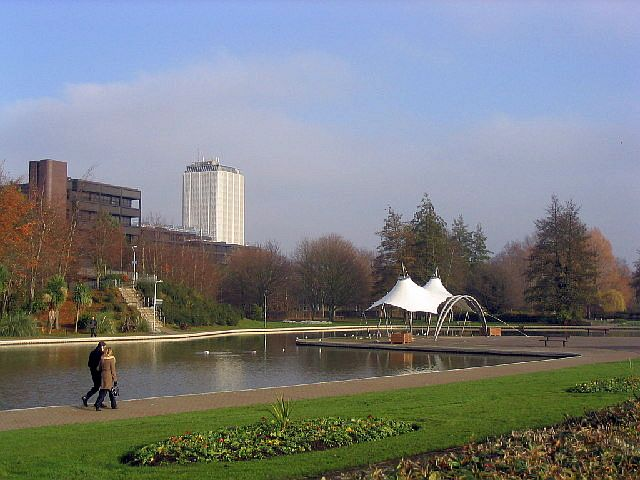
Eastrop Park, with Fanum House in the background

Outside the town centre there is a leisure park featuring the Aquadrome swimming pool (recently refurbished), which opened in May 2002. Also located at the leisure park are an ice rink, a bowling alley, an indoor sky-diving centre with ski and surf machines, a Bingo club and a ten-screen Odeon (formerly Vue prior to the takeover of the Ster Century cinema in Festival Place, and before that, Warner-Village) cinema, as well as a restaurant and fast food outlets. The leisure park is home to the Milestones Museum, a living history museum which contains a network of streets and buildings based on the history of Hampshire.

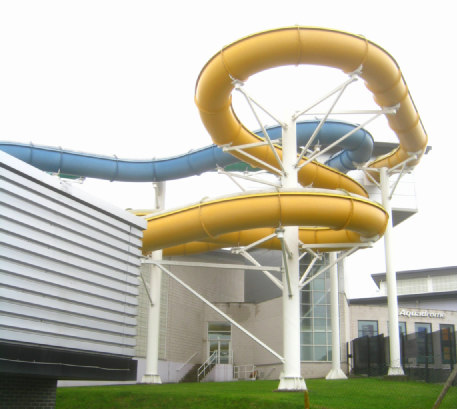
Basingstoke Aquadrome

The town has a football club, Basingstoke Town F.C., the Basingstoke Rugby Football Club and the Basingstoke Bison ice hockey team. There is also a swimming team, known as the Basingstoke Bluefins and an American Flag Football Team, known as the Basingstoke Zombie Horde. Further sporting organisations in the area include Basingstoke & Mid Hants Athletic Club, Basingstoke Demons Floorball Club, Basingstoke Volleyball Club, Basingstoke Bulls Korfball Club and Lasham Gliding Society. The home ground of Basingstoke & North Hants Cricket Club, Mays Bounty, was used once a season by Hampshire County Cricket Club until 2000.

=== Musical groups ===
Basingstoke has a wide diversity for musical groups ranging from brass bands to symphony orchestras. The Basingstoke Concert Band is a traditional wind band which has now been in existence for more than 35 years. The band was started in 1977 by Lawrie Shaw when Brighton Hill Community School opened, where he was the first headteacher. Shaw formed the band as an evening class for amateur wind players and it was then known as the Brighton Hill Centre Band.

=== Media ===
There are two local newspapers: the Basingstoke Gazette and the Basingstoke Observer. The town is also covered by the broadsheet newspaper Hampshire Chronicle.

Local TV coverage is provided by BBC South and ITV Meridian, with BBC London and ITV London also received in the town.

Basingstoke is served by three regional radio stations:

- BBC Radio Berkshire
- Greatest Hits Radio Berkshire & North Hampshire, serving North Hampshire and parts of Surrey and Sussex
- Heart South, previously broadcast from Reading.

The town has coverage from digital radio; the BBC, Independent National and Now Reading multiplexes can be received in the town; the outskirts can also receive London and South Hampshire stations. The BBC national stations and DAB coverage is enhanced by a small relay just south of the town centre.

The local radio station is HHCR - Basingstoke's Community Radio, an internet-based broadcaster opened on 3 June 2019 by Cllr Diane Taylor Mayor of Basingstoke and Deane.

== Education ==
The Holy Ghost’s School (subsequently Queen Mary's School for Boys) was a state funded grammar school operating in Basingstoke for four centuries, from 1556 until 1970, producing nationally recognised alumni such as Revd. Gilbert White (1720–1793), a pioneer naturalist, and the famed cricket commentator, John Arlott (1914–1991).

In modern times, education in Basingstoke has been co-ordinated by Hampshire County Council. Each neighbourhood in the town has at least one primary school, while secondary schools are distributed around the town on larger campuses. Basingstoke has two large further education colleges: a sixth form college, Queen Mary's College (QMC) and Basingstoke College of Technology (BCoT). The University of Winchester had a campus in Basingstoke (Chute House Campus) which closed in July 2011; it had offered full-time and part-time university courses in subjects including childhood studies, various management pathways, community development and creative industries. Bournemouth University's health and social care students can work on placement at the North Hampshire Hospital. The hospital only caters for midwifery students.

== Transport ==
=== Railway ===
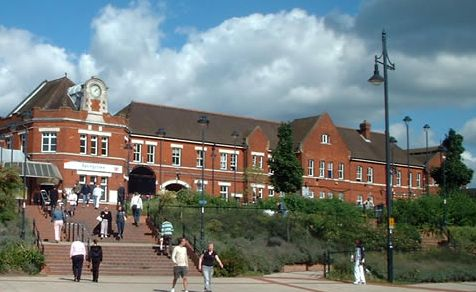
Basingstoke railway station, as seen from Alençon Link in 2005

Basingstoke railway station is served by three lines:

- The South West Main Line runs east to west through the centre of the town. South Western Railway provides regular services to London Waterloo, Winchester, Southampton Central, Bournemouth and Weymouth.
- The West of England line links the town to Salisbury and Exeter St Davids.
- The Reading–Basingstoke line runs north-east to Reading. CrossCountry operates services as part of an important through-route for longer distance services between Bournemouth, Birmingham New Street and Manchester Piccadilly.

The town was also the terminus of the former Basingstoke and Alton Light Railway.

=== Road ===
Basingstoke is situated close to junctions 6, 7 and 8 of the M3 motorway; it skirts the town's south-eastern edge, linking the town to London, Southampton and the South West. The central area of the town is encircled by The Ringway, a ring road constructed in the 1960s, and is bisected east to west by the A3010 (Churchill Way). The A33 runs north-east to Reading and the M4 motorway, and south-west to Winchester. The A30 runs east to Hook and west to Salisbury. The A303 to Wiltshire and the West Country begins a few miles south-west of Basingstoke, sharing the first few miles with the A30. On the M3, there is a flyover, which passes over the slip road to A303, near Junction 8. The A339 runs south-east to Alton and north-west to Newbury.

=== Buses ===
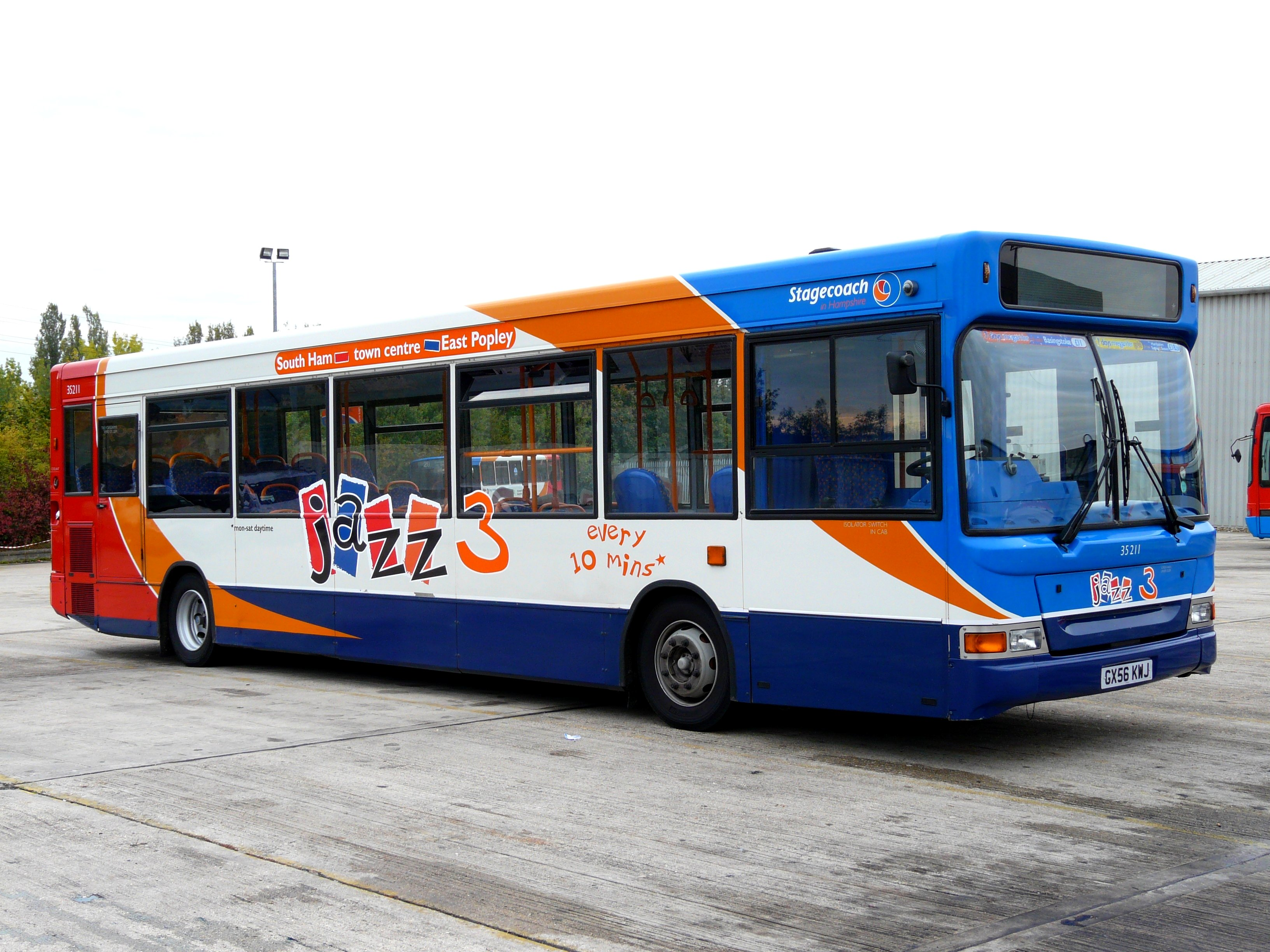
A Stagecoach Dart in Jazz livery

Most services in the town operate from Basingstoke bus station. The Stagecoach Group, through their Stagecoach in Hampshire sub-division, is the largest operator. Basingstoke Community Transport and Communities First Wessex run some smaller routes.

A peak-time service is provided by Thames Valley Buses between Chineham Business Park and the railway station. National Express offers direct coach services to London and Southampton.

=== Cycling ===
Separating cyclists from other road traffic was not part of the remit of the 1960s town redevelopment and, in 1996, the perception of provision for cyclists was very poor. Following the Basingstoke Area Cycling Strategy in 1999 an extensive cycle network was developed, mainly utilising on-road routes or off-road routes that run parallel with and directly alongside roads. Basingstoke was linked to Reading on the National Cycle Network route 23 in May 2003; the route was extended south to Alton and Alresford in April 2006.

=== Basingstoke Canal ===
The Basingstoke Canal started at a canal basin, roughly where the cinema in Festival Place is located. From there the canal ran alongside the River Loddon following the line of Eastrop Way. The old canal route passes under the perimeter ring road and then follows a long loop partly on an embankment to pass over small streams and water meadows towards Old Basing, where the route goes around the ruins of Basing House and then through and around the eastern edge of Old Basing. It followed another loop to go over small streams near the Hatch public house (a lot of this section was built over when constructing the M3) and headed across fields on an embankment towards Mapledurwell. The section of the canal from Up Nately to the western entrance of the Greywell Tunnel still exists and is a nature reserve; there is water in the canal and the canal towpath can be walked. A permissive footpath at the western entrance to the tunnel allows walkers to access public footpaths to get to the eastern entrance of the tunnel. The limit of navigation is about 500m east of the Greywell Tunnel. The renovated sections of the canal can then be navigated east towards West Byfleet where it joins the Wey Navigation, which itself can be navigated to the River Thames at Weybridge.

Aims to reconnect the town with the surviving sections of the Basingstoke Canal have been beset with difficulties, and actual restoration of a canal link is impossible. The Basingstoke Canal Society aspire to re-establish the route of the lost section of the canal as closely as possible with a footpath and cycleway.

== Religious sites ==
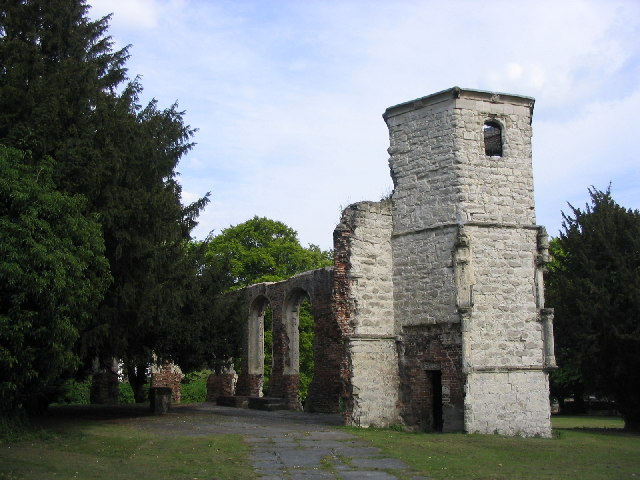
The remains of the 16th-century Chapel of the Holy Ghost

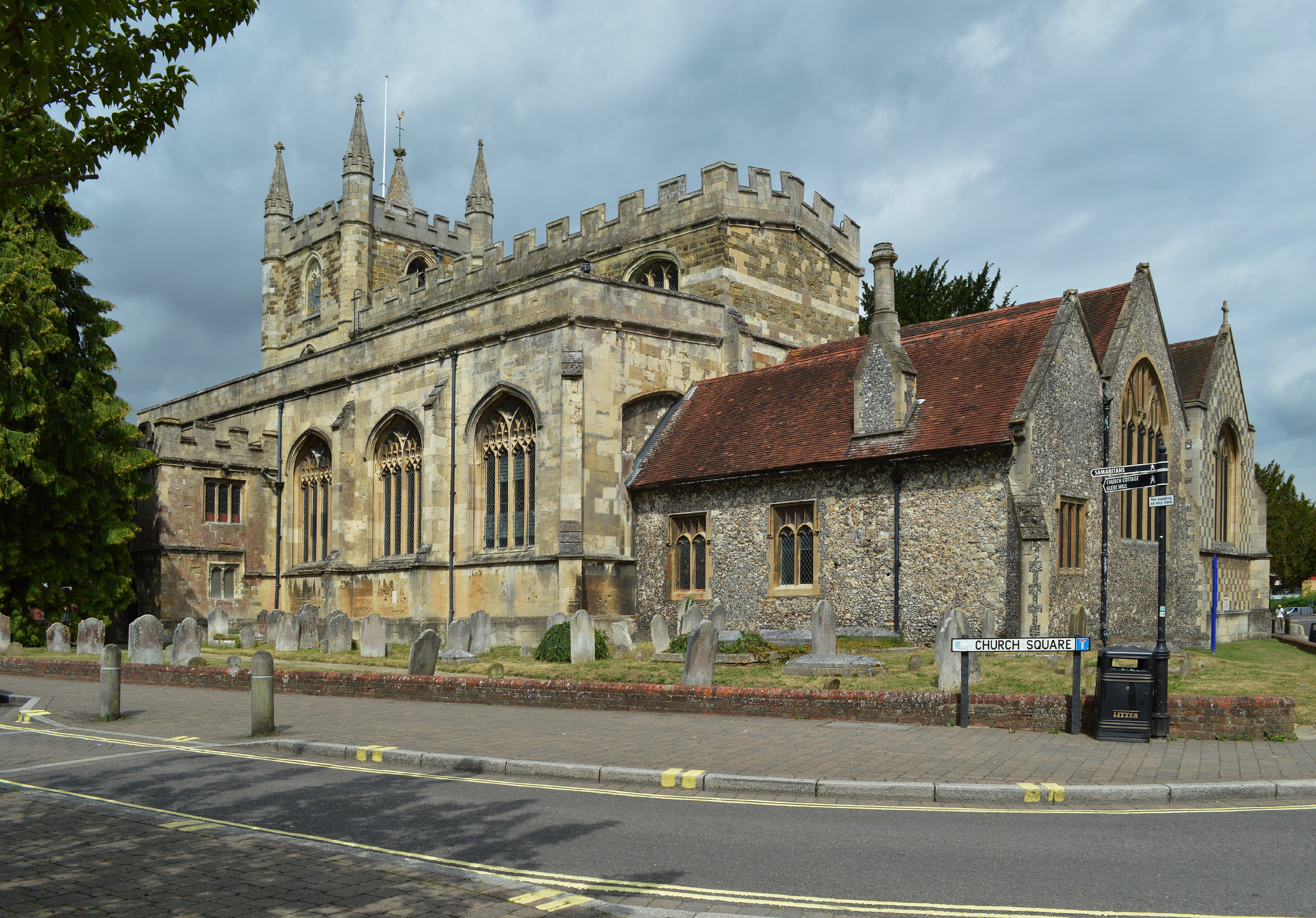
St Michael's Church

- The Anglican church of St. Michael's is located west of Festival Place. The chancel dates from 1464, and the south chapel may be older. The nave and aisles were added fifty years later by Richard Foxe, Bishop of Winchester. The Memorial Chapel at the north-east corner of the church was completed in 1921.
- The ruined Chapel of the Holy Ghost, north of the railway station, has not been a place of worship for four centuries, an effect of the Reformation. It was built by the first Lord Sandys, beginning in 1524, when King Henry VIII issued a charter of incorporation. The west tower of a 13th-century building also survives. It is surrounded by an ancient (as well as a more modern) cemetery; William, Lord Sandys himself lies buried in the chapel with his wife.
- In 1902, the Catholic Holy Ghost Church was built by Alexander Scoles, named after the old chapel. It is a Grade II listed building.
- The Church of St Mary, Eastrop is an old church, enlarged in 1912.
- All Saints' Church was built in 1915, designed by Temple Moore.
- St Peter's Church was built in 1964-5, designed by Ronald Sims and is in a housing estate built in the 1960s.
- In 2014, a group named Basingstoke Community Churches covered an area of six churches in the town. There are also an Assemblies of God church called Wessex Christian Fellowship, two Roman Catholic churches, St. Bede's and St. Joseph's, and churches of other denominations.
- In 2019, Gateway Church Basingstoke began a partnership with Christians Against Poverty (CAP) to launch a Debt Centre in Basingstoke.

== International relations ==
Basingstoke is twinned with:

- Braine-l'Alleud, Wallonia, Belgium
- Alençon, Normandy, France
- Euskirchen, North Rhine-Westphalia, Germany.

== Cultural associations ==
Basingstoke is referred to in Shakespeare's play Henry IV, Part 2 in Act 2, Scene 1, as the place where the king had slept overnight. In Gilbert and Sullivan's 1887 comic opera Ruddigore, "Basingstoke" is a code word, used by the "bad baronet" after he reforms, to remind his bride "Mad Margaret" of their plan to live lives of boring respectability. In 1895, Thomas Hardy referred to Basingstoke as "Stoke Barehills" in Jude the Obscure.

Basingstoke's North Hampshire Hospital was one of two hospitals used for the filming of Channel 4's hit comedy Green Wing. George Formby's film, He Snoops to Conquer was partly shot in the town in 1944 and in 1974 the National Film Board of Canada produced a documentary here called Basingstoke – Runcorn: British New Towns. The former Park Prewett Mental Hospital was the setting for the novel Poison in the Shade (1953), by Eric Benfield, a local author and sculptor who worked as an art therapist at that hospital. Parts of the MCU film Spider-Man: Brand New Day were filmed in Basingstoke.

Patrick Wilde's 1993 play, What's Wrong with Angry?, is set in Basingstoke. It was later adapted into the 1998 film, Get Real, which was filmed at various locations around Basingstoke.

== See also ==
- Basingstoke (video game)
