= Diocese of Winchester =

Diocese of the Church of England

Coordinates: 51.0607°N 1.3131°W

Diocese of Winchester Dioecesis Wintoniensis
- Coat of arms

- Flag

Location
- Ecclesiastical province: Canterbury
- Archdeaconries: Bournemouth, Winchester

Statistics
- Parishes: 255
- Churches: 375

Information
- Cathedral: Winchester Cathedral
- Language: English

Current leadership
- Bishop: Philip Mounstephen
- Suffragans: Rhiannon King, Bishop of Southampton; Kelly Betteridge, Bishop of Basingstoke
- Archdeacons: Richard Brand, Archdeacon of Winchester; Archdeacon of Bournemouth (vacant)

Website
- winchester.anglican.org

The Diocese of Winchester forms part of the Province of Canterbury of the Church of England. Founded in 660 AD, it is one of the oldest dioceses in England. With its see city at Winchester, it once covered the Kingdom of Wessex, many times its present size. As other dioceses were erected in its territory, today it covers most of the historic enlarged county of Hampshire. The 11th century Winchester Cathedral is the mother church of the diocese, the seat of the Bishop of Winchester.

== Territory ==
The area of the diocese is an area of eastern Dorset and modern Hampshire, including the city of Southampton, with four exceptions:

- the south-eastern quarter of the county, together with the Isle of Wight, constitutes the Diocese of Portsmouth
- an area in the north-east in the Diocese of Guildford
- a small area in the west in the Diocese of Salisbury
- one parish in the north in the Diocese of Oxford

The diocese historically covered a much larger area, see below. In the most recent major revision in 1927, the Archdeaconry of Surrey was removed to form the new Diocese of Guildford, and south-eastern Hampshire and the Isle of Wight were removed to form the Diocese of Portsmouth.

The Bishop of Winchester is ex officio a Lord Spiritual of the Westminster Parliament, one of five clerics (specifically certain prelates) of the Church of England with such automatic entitlement. The bishop is also prelate of the Most Noble Order of the Garter, that office having been held by every Bishop of Winchester since the order was created.

== Bishops ==
The Bishop of Winchester (Philip Mounstephen) heads the diocese and is assisted by two suffragan bishops, the bishops of Southampton (Rhiannon King) and of Basingstoke (Kelly Betteridge), who are informally responsible for the north and south of the diocese respectively (roughly corresponding to the archdeaconries of Winchester and Bournemouth). From 1927 until the suffragan see of Basingstoke was created in 1973, the Bishop of Southampton was the suffragan bishop for the whole diocese. There had previously also been suffragan sees of Guildford (1874–1927) and of Dorking (1905–1909).

Other bishops living in the diocese are licensed as honorary assistant bishops:

- 2009–present: Christopher Herbert, retired diocesan Bishop of St Albans, lives outside the diocese in Wrecclesham, Surrey.
- 2012–present: Timothy Bavin, oblate master at Alton Abbey, is a retired Bishop of Portsmouth who is licensed as an honorary assistant bishop in both Winchester (in which diocese the abbey lies) and Portsmouth dioceses.

Alternative episcopal oversight for parishes in the diocese which do not accept the sacramental ministry of women priests is provided by the provincial episcopal visitor, Norman Banks, suffragan Bishop of Richborough, who is licensed as an honorary assistant bishop for ministry in the diocese.

Traditionally, the Channel Islands were part of the diocese. After a conflict with the 97th bishop, oversight of the Channel Islands was delegated from 2014 to 2019 to Trevor Willmott, an honorary assistant bishop of the diocese and, until his 2019 retirement, Bishop of Dover. In 2022, the Channel Islands were transferred permanently to the Diocese of Salisbury in accordance with the Channel Islands Measure 2020.

=== 2021 rebellion ===
On 20 May 2021, it was reported that the Bishop of Winchester, Tim Dakin, had "stepped back" as bishop for six weeks in light of the threat of a diocesan synod motion of no confidence in his leadership. Williams also "stepped back" and Debbie Sellin (then-Bishop of Southampton) served as acting diocesan bishop. Dakin did not return to active ministry, and in February 2022 resigned his see and retired.

== History ==
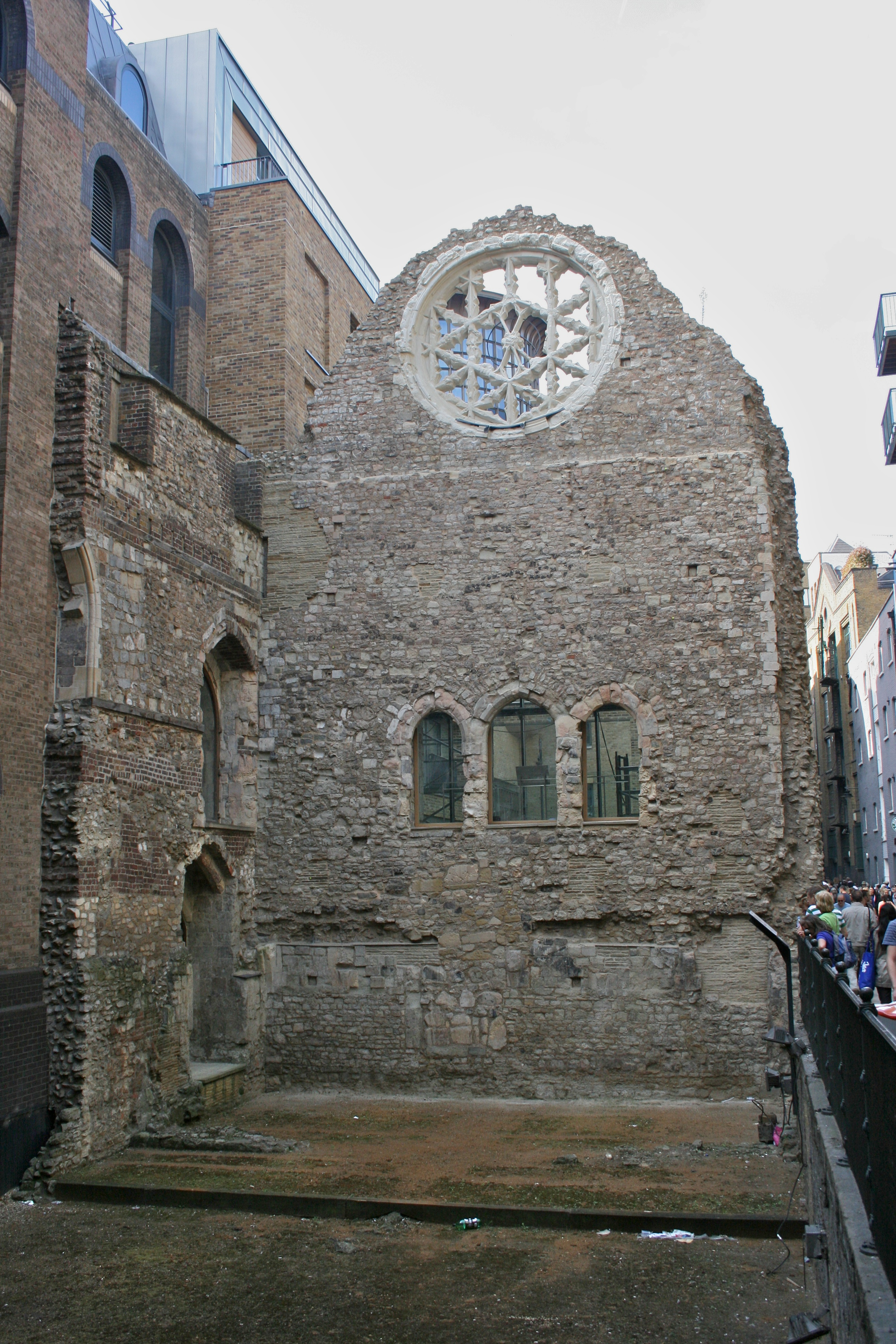
Remains of the great hall of Winchester Palace, yards from London Bridge in Southwark showing the Rose Window and underneath the traditional arrangement of three doors from the screens passage to the buttery, pantry and kitchen. Until 1877 all of Surrey (including Southwark) was part of the diocese.

The Diocese of Winchester is one of the oldest and most influential in England. Originally a Catholic diocese, it was the see of the kingdom of Wessex (as such it is sometimes called the "Diocese of Wessex"), with the first cathedra at lost Dorchester Cathedral which site is commemorated by later medieval Dorchester Abbey church in south-central Oxfordshire. The cathedral was founded and served successively by Saints Birinus and Agilbert, the first a missionary sent from Rome. This Wessex diocese not only covered most of Hampshire, Isle of Wight, Surrey, Berkshire, parts of Oxfordshire and Wiltshire but for the first few decades three more south-western counties mentioned below.

The bishop's seat was swiftly transferred to Winchester in AD 660: the episcopal cathedral see was, at some point, at Old Minster, Winchester. Around 704–705, Aldhelm saw the four south-west peninsular counties of England, save for Cornwall, form the Diocese of Sherborne. To Devon, Somerset and Dorset, Cornwall was added at the end of the ninth century. These were well-settled and healthy counties in relative terms and in about 909 Sherborne was divided in three with the creation of the bishoprics of Wells, covering Somerset, and Crediton, covering Devon and Cornwall, leaving Sherborne comprising Dorset. Winchester shed north-western lands in AD 909 such that Wiltshire and Berkshire and the parts of Oxfordshire formed the See of Ramsbury.

The see of the Bishop of Winchester ran from the Isle of Wight and later the Channel Islands to the south bank of the River Thames at Southwark close to London Bridge where the remnant shell of his city palace is Winchester Palace. It formed one of the largest and richest sees in England if not all of Europe. During the Middle Ages, the rump diocese left of all areas appertaining to Hampshire and Surrey before those counties shrank was one of the wealthiest English sees, owning for instance the rectories (the feudal landlord's interest in farms, fisheries, mills and great or small tithes) of many churches in its former, greater area and even in Norman France. Its bishops included a number of politically prominent Englishmen, notably the 9th century Saint Swithun and medieval magnates including William of Wykeham and Henry of Blois.

Amid the English Reformation, the 1530s the diocese faced low compensation for the confiscation of its accumulated wealth and monastic feudal dues and lands in the Dissolution of the monasteries such as, principally, the pensioning of abbots and friars and in some cases granting of the rectories to the incumbent priests. Later the diocese found it difficult to prevent unlawful, nefarious subletting of some of its buildings, for morally dubious purposes such as connected with the numerous British Empire wharves involved in the slave trade often due to the distance, physically and legally from the perpetrators in ownership/operating structure of diocesan clergy and administrators as chief landlords. In the early 19th century office holders lobbied hard with other bishops to bring to an end the trade in the House of Lords, through its missionaries, and in the messages preached across the diocese itself.

The Report of the Commissioners appointed by his Majesty to inquire into the Ecclesiastical Revenues of England and Wales (1835) found the Winchester see was the third wealthiest in England, after Canterbury and London, with an annual net income of £11,151.

By the 19th century much of the non-church buildings estate of the church had been lost, some statutorily such as by the Tithe Acts procedures but much willingly sold for urban church building. Many schools built by the diocese transferred to state hands in the process of secularisation and National school charitable movement as it evolved under Disraeli. Many schools were co-founded by the diocese in the 20th century and various remain supported by the diocese.

== Channel Islands component ==
The Channel Islands were transferred from the Diocese of Coutances in Normandy, France, in 1500 by papal bull. The transfer was later confirmed by a letter from Elizabeth I and an order in council dated 11 March 1569 which expressly perpetually united the islands with the diocese and, for avoidance of doubt, the bishop, which remains the law. The islands have for centuries operated their own canon law variants under the bishop.

The islands were voluntarily removed from the then bishop's involvement in 2014 after a dispute with Tim Dakin, who agreed to their Anglican churches' worship, work and ethos being overseen by Trevor Willmott, then the Bishop of Dover. This measure was ratified by the parent province authorities of Canterbury as interim. It arises by use of the powers of episcopal delegation: Dakin delegated his authority up to the Archbishop of Canterbury who in turn delegated it down to the Bishop of Dover. Willmott was previously Bishop of Basingstoke, a suffragan see of the Winchester diocese, and in that capacity was familiar with the islands' preferences.

A 2019 decision of the General Synod required that the Channel Islands should transfer to the Diocese of Salisbury, and the transfer was completed in November 2022.

== Notoriety of the Liberty of the Clink ==
A small area of Southwark for centuries lay outside the jurisdiction of the City of London, and that of the county authorities of Surrey, and some activities forbidden in those areas were permitted within it.

In 1161, Bishop Henry (and successors) was granted power to license prostitutes and brothels in the liberty by King Henry II. The prostitutes were known as "Winchester Geese", and many are buried in Cross Bones in unconsecrated ground. Similarly, to "be bitten by a Winchester goose" (mid 16th-17th century) meant "to have/contract a venereal disease", and "goose bumps" was slang for symptoms of venereal diseases. Theatres and playhouses were allowed in the Clink; the most famous was the Globe Theatre where William Shakespeare performed his plays. Another was The Rose, where Shakespeare and Christopher Marlowe both premiered plays. Bull and bear baiting were also permitted.

== Archdeaconries and deaneries ==
Diocese	Archdeaconries	Rural deaneries	Paid clergy	Churches	Population	People per paid cleric	People per church	Churches per paid cleric	
Diocese of Winchester	Archdeaconry of Winchester	Deanery of Alresford	7	27	14,503	2,072	537	3.86	
Diocese of Winchester	Archdeaconry of Winchester	Deanery of Alton	5	22	32,066	6,413	1,458	4.4	
Diocese of Winchester	Archdeaconry of Winchester	Deanery of Andover	8	34	63,636	7,955	1,872	4.25	
Diocese of Winchester	Archdeaconry of Winchester	Deanery of Basingstoke	14	26	130,393	9,314	5,015	1.86	
Diocese of Winchester	Archdeaconry of Winchester	Deanery of Odiham	11	28	54,655	4,969	1,952	2.55	
Diocese of Winchester	Archdeaconry of Winchester	Deanery of Whitchurch	5	24	25,450	5,090	1,060	4.8	
Diocese of Winchester	Archdeaconry of Winchester	Deanery of Winchester	17*	34*	67,611	3,977	1,989	2	
Diocese of Winchester	Archdeaconry of Bournemouth	Deanery of Bournemouth	18	26	149,595	8,311	5,754	1.44	
Diocese of Winchester	Archdeaconry of Bournemouth	Deanery of Christchurch	12	28	111,649	9,304	3,981	2.33	
Diocese of Winchester	Archdeaconry of Bournemouth	Deanery of Eastleigh	15	20	146,229	9,749	7,311	1.33	
Diocese of Winchester	Archdeaconry of Bournemouth	Deanery of Lyndhurst	17	35	117,144	6,891	3,347	2.06	
Diocese of Winchester	Archdeaconry of Bournemouth	Deanery of Romsey	7	28	44,962	6,423	1,606	4	
Diocese of Winchester	Archdeaconry of Bournemouth	Deanery of Southampton	21	23	219,365	10,446	9,538	1.10	
Diocese of Winchester	Total/average			188	398	1,340,964	7,133	3,369	2.12

*including Cathedral

Additionally, from shortly after 6 April 2014 Paul Moore was instituted "Archdeacon for Mission Development"; this had no sub-territory and was a role to help reach out (mission). His appointment ended in 2020.

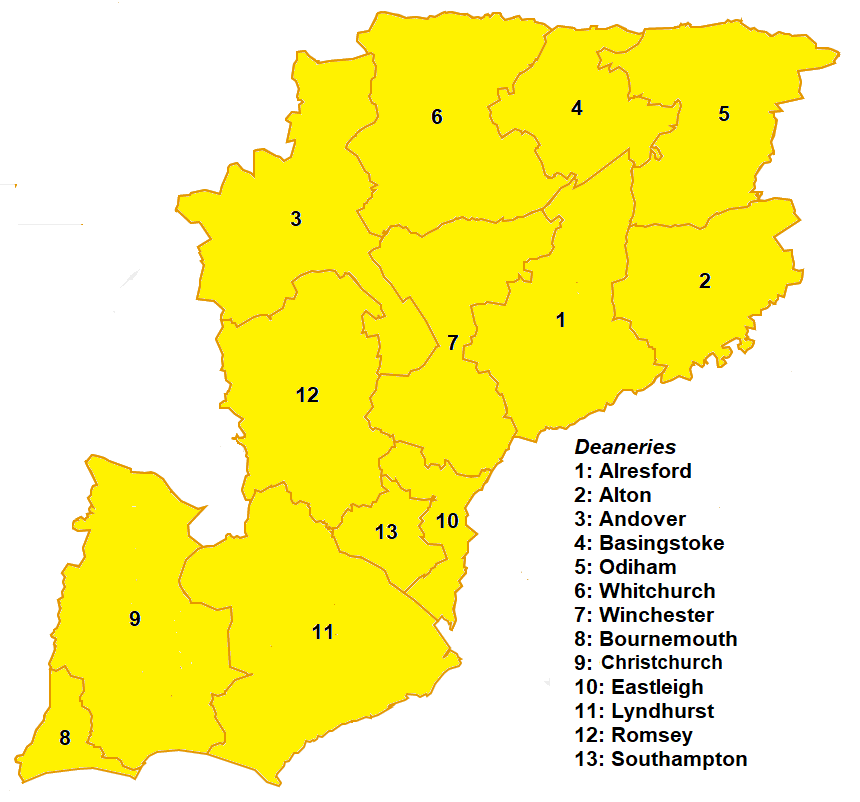
Deaneries of the Diocese of Winchester

== Churches ==
=== Not in a deanery ===
Benefice	Churches	Link	Clergy	Population served	Ref
Cathedra	Winchester Cathedral		Dean: Catherine Ogle; Canon: Sue Wallace; Canon: Ronald Riem; Canon: Mark Collinson	166	

=== Deanery of Alresford ===
Benefice	Churches	Link	Clergy	Population served	Ref
Alre Valley Benefice, The, Comprising Bighton, New Alresford, Old Alresford, and Ovington with Itchen Stoke	St John the Baptist, New Alresford; All Saints, Bighton; St Mary, Old Alresford; St Peter, Ovington		Priest-in-Charge: Julia Myles; Curate: Natasha Anderson	6,573	
Bishop's Sutton (St Nicholas) and Ropley and West Tisted	St Nicholas, Bishop's Sutton; St Peter, Ropley; St Mary Magdalene, West Tisted		Priest-in-Charge: Clare Welham	2,224	
Farleigh (St Andrew), Candover and Wield, Including Bradley, and Northington with Swarraton	All Saints, Bradley; St Peter, Brown Candover; St Leonard, Cliddesden; All Saints, Dummer; St Martin, Ellisfield; St Andrew, Farleigh Wallop; St John the Evangelist, Northington; St Mary the Virgin, Preston Candover; St James, Wield		Rector: David Chattell; Curate: Stephen Mourant	2,579	
Itchen Valley, The, Comprising Avington, Easton, Itchen Abbas, and Martyr Worthy	St Mary, Avington; St Mary, Easton; St John the Baptist, Itchen Abbas; St Swithun, Martyr Worthy		Priest-in-Charge: Alex Pease	1,341	
Itchen, Upper, Comprising Beauworth, Bramdean, Cheriton, Hinton Ampner, Kilmeston, and Tichborne	St James, Beauworth; SS Simon & Jude, Bramdean; Church in the Wood, Bramdean Common; St Michael & All Angels, Cheriton; All Saints, Hinton Ampner; St Andrew, Kilmeston; St Andrew, Tichborne		Rector: Christopher Durrant; Curate: Janice Brookshaw; NSM: Caroline Strudwick	1,786	

=== Deanery of Alton ===
Benefice	Churches	Link	Clergy	Population served	Ref
Alton Resurrection (All Saints) (St Lawrence)	All Saints, Alton; St Lawrence, Alton; St Peter, Beech; Holy Rood, Holybourne		Vicar: Andrew Micklefield; NSM: Lynn Power; NSM: Joy Windsor; NSM: Rachel Sturt	18,645	
Bentley (St Mary), Binsted and Froyle	St Mary, Bentley; Holy Cross, Binsted; Assumption of the Blessed Virgin Mary, Froyle		Rector: Yann Dubreuil; NSM: Christopher Thomson	2,812	
Bentworth (St Mary), Lasham, Medstead and Shalden	St Mary, Bentworth; St Mary, Lasham; SS Peter & Paul, Shalden		Priest-in-Charge: Edward Pruen	2,080	
Bentworth (St Mary), Lasham, Medstead and Shalden	St Andrew, Medstead		Priest-in-Charge: Edward Pruen	2,080	
Four Marks (Good Shepherd)	Good Shepherd, Four Marks		Vicar: Howard Wright	4,803	
Northanger Benefice, The, Comprising Chawton, East Tisted with Colemore, East Worldham, Farringdon, Hartley Mauditt with West Worldham, Kingsley with Oakhanger, Newton Valence, and Selborne	St Nicholas, Chawton; St James, East Tisted; St Mary the Virgin, East Worldham; All Saints, Farringdon; St Leonard, Hartley Mauditt; St Nicholas, West Worldham; All Saints, Kingsley; St Mary Magdalene, Oakhanger; St Mary, Newton Valence; St Mary, Selborne		Rector: Tony Pears; NSM: Lesley Leon	3,726	

=== Deanery of Andover ===
Benefice	Churches	Link	Clergy	Population served	Ref
Abbotts Ann (St Mary) and Upper Clatford and Goodworth Clatford	St Mary, Abbotts Ann; St Peter, Goodworth Clatford		Priest-in-Charge: Katrina Dykes; NSM: Nicola Judd	3,730	
Abbotts Ann (St Mary) and Upper Clatford and Goodworth Clatford	All Saints, Upper Clatford		Priest-in-Charge: Katrina Dykes; NSM: Nicola Judd	3,730	
Andover (St Mary)	St Mary, Andover		Vicar: Chris Bradish	14,313	
Appleshaw (St Peter) Kimpton, Thruxton, Fyfield and Shipton Bellinger	St Peter, Appleshaw; St Nicholas, Fyfield; SS Peter & Paul, Kimpton; St Peter, Shipton Bellinger; SS Peter & Paul, Thruxton		Priest-in-Charge: Sandra Williams	3,427	
Downs Benefice, The, Comprising Chilbolton, Crawley, Littleton, Sparsholt with Lainston, and Wherwell	St Mary the Less, Chilbolton; St Mary, Crawley; St Catherine of Alexandria, Littleton; St Stephen, Sparsholt; St Peter & Holy Cross, Wherwell		Rector: Jacqueline Machin	4,372	
Knight's Enham (St Michael and All Angels) (St Paul's Church Centre)	St Michael & All Angels, Knight's Enham; St Paul, Knight's Enham		Priest-in-Charge: Lee Davies	11,110	
Hurstbourne Tarrant (St Peter) and Faccombe and Vernham Dean and Linkenholt	St Peter, Hurstbourne Tarrant; St Barnabas, Faccombe; St Peter, Linkenholt; St Mary the Virgin, Vernham Dean		Priest-in-Charge: Vacant; Curate: Trevor Lewis	9,560	
Pastrow, Comprising Charlton with Foxcotte, Hatherden with Tangley, Penton Mewsey, Smannell with Enham Alamein, and Weyhill	St Thomas, Charlton; Christ Church, Hatherden; St Thomas of Canterbury, Tangley; Holy Trinity, Penton Mewsey; St George, Enham Alamein; Christ Church, Smannell; St Michael & All Angels, Weyhill		Priest-in-Charge: Alex Randle-Bissell	9,560	
Portway and Danebury Benefice, The, Comprising Amport, Grateley, Monxton, Nether Wallop, Over Wallop, Quarley, and West Andover	St Peter, Over Wallop		Team Rector: Peter Gilks; Team Vicar: Vanessa Cole; Hon. Curate: Matthew Grayshon	17,124	
Portway and Danebury Benefice, The, Comprising Amport, Grateley, Monxton, Nether Wallop, Over Wallop, Quarley, and West Andover	St Michael & All Angels, West Andover		Team Rector: Peter Gilks; Team Vicar: Vanessa Cole; Hon. Curate: Matthew Grayshon	17,124	
Portway and Danebury Benefice, The, Comprising Amport, Grateley, Monxton, Nether Wallop, Over Wallop, Quarley, and West Andover	St Mary, Amport; St Leonard, Grateley; St Mary, Monxton; St Andrew, Nether Wallop; St Michael & All Angels, Quarley		Team Rector: Peter Gilks; Team Vicar: Vanessa Cole; Hon. Curate: Matthew Grayshon	17,124	

=== Deanery of Basingstoke ===
Benefice	Churches	Link	Clergy	Population served	Ref
Basing, Old (St Mary) and Lychpit	St Mary, Old Basing		Vicar: Vacant; Curate: Sarah Lloyd	7,369	
Basingstoke (All Saints) (St Michael)	St Michael, Basingstoke; All Saints, Basingstoke; Christ the King, Brighton Hill; St Peter, South Ham		Team Rector: Jo Stoker; Team Vicar: Alison Bennett; NSM: Pat Palmer	44,920	
Baughurst (St Stephen) and Ramsdell and Wolverton with Ewhurst and Hannington	St Stephen, Baughurst; All Saints, Hannington; Christ Church, Ramsdell; St Catherine, Wolverton		Rector: David Barlow	1,858	
Chineham (Christ Church)	Christ Church, Chineham		Vicar: Jonathan Clark; NSM: Gordon Randall	7,992	
Eastrop (St Mary)	St Mary, Basingstoke		Rector: Clive Hawkins; Curate: Rob Phillips; NSM: Caroline West	2,182	
Hatch Warren and Beggarwood (Immanuel)	Immanuel, Hatch Warren & Beggarwood		Vicar: Vacant	10,401	
Kempshott (St Mark)	St Mark, Kempshott		Vicar: Nicola Such	6,128	
Oakley (St Leonard) with Wootton St Lawrence	St Leonard, Oakley; St Lawrence, Wootton		Rector: Vacant	5,341	
Popley with Limes Park and Rooksdown (St Gabriel)	St Gabriel, Popley		Vicar: Arthur Botham	12,460	
The Sherbornes (St Andrew) (Vyne Chapel) with Pamber	St Andrew, Sherborne St John; All Saints, Monk Sherborne; SS Mary & John the Baptist, Pamber		Rector: John Hamilton	4,316	
Tadley (St Mary) (St Peter) (St Paul) with Pamber Heath and Silchester	St Mary, Silchester		Rector: Richard Harlow; Curate: Rob Young; Curate: Gillian Sakakini	15,548	
Tadley (St Mary) (St Peter) (St Paul) with Pamber Heath and Silchester	St Mary, North Tadley		Rector: Richard Harlow; Curate: Rob Young; Curate: Gillian Sakakini	15,548	
Tadley (St Mary) (St Peter) (St Paul) with Pamber Heath and Silchester	St Paul, Tadley; St Peter, Tadley; St Luke, Pamber Heath		Rector: Richard Harlow; Curate: Rob Young; Curate: Gillian Sakakini	15,548	
Winklebury (Good Shepherd) and Worting	Good Shepherd, Winklebury; St Thomas of Canterbury, Worting		Rector: John Wigmore	11,878	

=== Deanery of Odiham ===
Benefice	Churches	Link	Clergy	Population served	Ref
Darby Green (St Barnabas) and Eversley	St Barnabas the Encourager, Darby Green		Priest-in-Charge: Lerys Campbell; NSM: Rachel Hartland	8,487	
Darby Green (St Barnabas) and Eversley	St Mary, Eversley; Bramshill Mission Church		Priest-in-Charge: Lerys Campbell; NSM: Rachel Hartland	8,487	
Hartley Wintney (St John the Evangelist), Elvetham, Winchfield and Dogmersfield	St John the Evangelist, Hartley Wintney		Priest-in-Charge: Angela Smith; Curate: Ben Chase; Curate: Janette Smith	5,899	
Hartley Wintney (St John the Evangelist), Elvetham, Winchfield and Dogmersfield	All Saints, Dogmersfield		Priest-in-Charge: Angela Smith; Curate: Ben Chase; Curate: Janette Smith	5,899	
Hartley Wintney (St John the Evangelist), Elvetham, Winchfield and Dogmersfield	St Mary the Virgin, Winchfield		Priest-in-Charge: Angela Smith; Curate: Ben Chase; Curate: Janette Smith	5,899	
North Hampshire Downs Benefice, The, Comprising Herriard with Winslade, Long Sutton, Newnham with Nately Scures with Mapledurwell with Up Nately with Greywell, Odiham, South Warnborough, Tunworth, Upton Grey, and Weston Patrick	St Mary, Herriard; All Saints, Long Sutton; St Mary, Greywell; St Mary, Mapledurwell; St Swithun, Nately Scures; St Nicholas, Newnham; St Stephen, Up Nately; All Saints, Odiham; St Andrew, South Warnborough; All Saints, Tunworth; St Mary, Upton Grey; St Lawrence, Weston Patrick		Rector: Simon Butler; Curate: Alison Brown; Curate: Helen O'Sullivan; NSM: Linda Scard; NSM: Mary-Beth Hawrish; NSM: Christopher Dudgeon	9,421	
Sherfield-On-Loddon (St Leonard) and Stratfield Saye with Hartley Wespall with Stratfield Turgis and Bramley	St James, Bramley; St Stephen, Little London		Priest-in-Charge: Stephen Ball; NSM: John Lenton	7,904	
Sherfield-On-Loddon (St Leonard) and Stratfield Saye with Hartley Wespall with Stratfield Turgis and Bramley	St Leonard, Sherfield-on-Loddon		Priest-in-Charge: Stephen Ball; NSM: John Lenton	7,904	
Sherfield-On-Loddon (St Leonard) and Stratfield Saye with Hartley Wespall with Stratfield Turgis and Bramley	St Mary, Stratfield Saye; St Mary, Hartley Wespall		Priest-in-Charge: Stephen Ball; NSM: John Lenton	7,904	
Whitewater Benefice, The, Comprising Heckfield with Mattingley and Rotherwick, and Hook	St Michael, Heckfield; Mattingley Church; Rotherwick Church; St John the Evangelist, Hook		Priest-in-Charge: Marion de Quidt; Curate: Mark Lewis; NSM: Shona Hoad	9,221	
Yateley (St Peter)	St Peter, Yateley		Rector: Andrew Edmunds	13,723	

=== Deanery of Whitchurch ===
Benefice	Churches	Link	Clergy	Population served	Ref
Burghclere (Ascension) (All Saints) with Newtown and Ecchinswell with Sydmonton	Ascension, Burghclere		Rector: David Bartholomew	2,550	
Burghclere (Ascension) (All Saints) with Newtown and Ecchinswell with Sydmonton	SS Mary & John the Baptist, Newtown; St Lawrence, Ecchinswell		Rector: David Bartholomew	2,550	
Hurstbourne Priors (St Andrew), Longparish, St Mary Bourne and Woodcott	St Peter, St Mary Bourne		Vicar: Craig Marshall; NSM: Diana Marsden; NSM: Richard Sutcliffe	2,395	
Hurstbourne Priors (St Andrew), Longparish, St Mary Bourne and Woodcott	St Andrew, Hurstbourne Priors; St Nicholas, Longparish; St James, Woodcott		Vicar: Craig Marshall; NSM: Diana Marsden; NSM: Richard Sutcliffe	2,395	
Kingsclere (St Mary) and Ashford Hill with Headley	St Mary, Kingsclere; St Paul, Ashford Hill; St Peter, Headley		Vicar: Ben Read	4,846	
North West Hampshire Benefice, The, Comprising Ashmansworth, Crux Easton, East Woodhay, Highclere, and Woolton Hill	St James, Ashmansworth; St Michael & All Angels, Crux Easton; St Martin, East Woodhay; St Michael & All Angels, Highclere; St Thomas, Woolton Hill		Rector: Christine Dale; Hon. Curate: Marvin Bamforth	4,752	
Overton (St Mary) with Laverstoke and Freefolk	St Mary, Laverstoke		Priest-in-Charge: Vacant; NSM (N Waltham): Julia Foster	5,979	
Overton (St Mary) with Laverstoke and Freefolk	St Mary, Overton		Priest-in-Charge: Vacant; NSM (N Waltham): Julia Foster	5,979	
Waltham, North (St Michael) and Steventon, Ashe and Deane	Holy Trinity & St Andrew, Ashe; All Saints, Deane; St Michael, North Waltham; St Nicholas, Steventon		Priest-in-Charge: Vacant; NSM (N Waltham): Julia Foster	5,979	
Whitchurch (All Hallows) with Tufton and Litchfield	All Hallows, Whitchurch; St James the Less, Litchfield; St Mary, Tufton		Priest-in-Charge: David Roche; Hon. Curate: Mark Christian	4,928	

=== Deanery of Winchester ===
Benefice	Churches	Link	Clergy	Population served	Ref
Compton (All Saints), Hursley, and Otterbourne	All Saints, Compton; All Saints, Hursley; St Matthew, Otterbourne		Rector: William Prescott	4,840	
Dever, Lower, Comprising Barton Stacey, Bullington, and South Wonston	St Margaret, South Wonston		Rector: Mark Bailey	3,247	
Dever, Lower, Comprising Barton Stacey, Bullington, and South Wonston	All Saints, Barton Stacey; St Michael & All Angels, Bullington		Rector: Mark Bailey	3,247	
Dever, Upper, Comprising East Stratton, Micheldever, Stoke Charity with Hunton, Wonston, and Woodmancote with Popham	Holy Trinity, Wonston		Priest-in-Charge: Paul Bradish; Curate: Sarah McClelland; Curate (Worthys): Jeannette Holder; NSM (Worthys): Lis Chase	8,429	
Dever, Upper, Comprising East Stratton, Micheldever, Stoke Charity with Hunton, Wonston, and Woodmancote with Popham	All Saints, East Stratton; St Mary the Virgin, Micheldever; St James, Hunton; SS Mary & Michael, Stoke Charity; St James, Woodmancote		Priest-in-Charge: Paul Bradish; Curate: Sarah McClelland; Curate (Worthys): Jeannette Holder; NSM (Worthys): Lis Chase	8,429	
Headbourne Worthy (St Swithun)	St Swithun, Headbourne Worthy		Priest-in-Charge: Paul Bradish; Curate: Sarah McClelland; Curate (Worthys): Jeannette Holder; NSM (Worthys): Lis Chase	8,429	
King's Worthy (St Mary) (St Mary's Chapel)	St Mary, King's Worthy; St Mary's Chapel, King's Worthy		Priest-in-Charge: Paul Bradish; Curate: Sarah McClelland; Curate (Worthys): Jeannette Holder; NSM (Worthys): Lis Chase	8,429	
Stanmore (St Luke)	St Luke, Stanmore; St Mark, Oliver's Battery		Priest-in-Charge: Ed Dines; Curate: Michael Gardner	17,112	
Winchester (St Barnabas)	St Barnabas, Winchester		Priest-in-Charge: Ed Dines; Curate: Michael Gardner	17,112	
Twyford (St Mary) and Owslebury and Morestead and Colden Common	Holy Trinity, Colden Common; Morestead Parish Church; St Andrew, Owlesbury; St Mary, Twyford		Vicar: Damon Draisey	6,434	
Winchester (Christ Church)	Christ Church, Winchester		Vicar: Simon Cansdale; Curate: Craig Philbrick; Curate: Clare Carson; Curate: James Whymark; NSM: Brian Wakelin; NSM: Amanda Denniss	4,106	
Winchester (Holy Trinity)	Holy Trinity, Winchester		Rector: Vacant	2,337	
Winchester (St Bartholomew) (St Lawrence) (St Swithun-Upon-Kingsgate)	St Bartholomew, Winchester; St Lawrence, Winchester; St Swithun-upon-Kingsgate, Winchester		Rector: Cliff Bannister; NSM: Amanda Goulding; NSM: Karen Kousseff	6,322	
Winchester (St Cross Hospital with St Faith)	St Cross, Winchester		Priest-in-Charge: Philip Krinks; NSM: Hilary Healey	1,949	
Winchester St Matthew (St Paul's Mission Church)	St Matthew, Winchester; St Paul, Winchester		Rector: Dr Jonathan Rowe; NSM: Mary Copping; NSM: Canon Professor Liz Stuart; Curate: Rhiannon Wilmott	5,752	
Winchester, East (All Saints), Including Chilcomb	St John the Baptist, Winchester; All Saints, Highcliffe; St Andrew, Chilcomb		Priest-in-Charge: Mike Griffiths; NSM: Christine Smith	6,917	

=== Deanery of Bournemouth ===
Benefice	Churches	Link	Clergy	Population served	Ref
Boscombe (St Andrew)	St Andrew, Boscombe (1908)		NSM: Neil Houlton	6,367	
Boscombe (St John the Evangelist)	St John the Evangelist, Boscombe (1891)		Vicar: Roy Khakhria	8,511	
Bournemouth (Holy Epiphany)	Holy Epiphany, Bournemouth		Priest-in-Charge: David Thompson	6,618	
Bournemouth (St Ambrose)	St Ambrose, Bournemouth		Hon. Priest-in-Charge: Adrian Pearce	6,408	
Bournemouth (St Andrew) Bennett Road	St Andrew, Bournemouth		Vicar: Graham Roberts; Hon. Curate: James Davies	10,060	
Bournemouth Town Centre (St Augustin) (St Peter) (St Stephen) with St Swithun and Holy Trinity	St Augustin, Bournemouth; St Peter, Bournemouth; St Stephen, Bournemouth		Team Rector: Ian Terry; Curate: Matt Clayton	12,544	
Bournemouth (St Clement) (St Swithun)	St Swithun, Bournemouth		Priest-in-Charge: Tim Matthews; Curate: Simon Nicholls	12,544	
Bournemouth (St Clement) (St Swithun)	St Clement, Boscombe		Priest-in-Charge: Tim Matthews; Curate: Simon Nicholls	8,509	
Bournemouth (St Francis)	St Francis of Assisi, Bournemouth		Priest-in-Charge: Jennifer Nightingale	7,001	
Bournemouth (St John) (St Michael and All Angels)	St John, Bournemouth; St Michael & All Angels, Bournemouth		Priest-in-Charge: Sarah Yetman	9,003	
Holdenhurst (St John the Evangelist) and Iford	St John the Evangelist, Holdenhurst; St Barnabas, Queen's Park		Vicar/Priest-in-Charge: Andy McPherson; NSM (Holdenhurst): Janice Seare; NSM: Nigel Legrand	18,477	
Holdenhurst (St John the Evangelist) and Iford	St Saviour, Iford		Vicar/Priest-in-Charge: Andy McPherson; NSM (Holdenhurst): Janice Seare; NSM: Nigel Legrand	18,477	
Southbourne (St Christopher)	St Christopher, Southbourne		Vicar/Priest-in-Charge: Andy McPherson; NSM (Holdenhurst): Janice Seare; NSM: Nigel Legrand	18,477	
Pokesdown (All Saints)	All Saints, Southbourne		Priest-in-Charge: Mike Powis; Curate: May Barker	9,350	
Pokesdown (St James)	St James the Greater, Pokesdown		Priest-in-Charge: John Pares	7,077	
Southbourne (St Katharine) (St Nicholas)	St Katharine, Southbourne; St Nicholas, Southbourne		Priest-in-Charge: Kevin Cable	7,606	
Throop (St Paul)	St Paul, Throop		Priest-in-Charge: Jim Findlay	5,432	
Westbourne (Christ Church) Chapel	Christ Church, Westbourne		Vicar: Nick Hiscocks	N/A	
Winton (St Alban), Moordown and Charminster	St Alban, Charminster; St John the Baptist, Moordown; St Luke, Winton		Vicar: Michael Smith; Curate: James Sharp; NSM: Jonathan Williams	26,632	

=== Deanery of Christchurch ===
Benefice	Churches	Link	Clergy	Population served	Ref
Bransgore (St Mary the Virgin) and Hinton Admiral	St Mary the Virgin, Bransgore; All Saints, Thorney Hill; St Michael & All Angels, Hinton Admiral		Priest-in-Charge: Benjamin Sargent	4,372	
Burley Ville (St John the Baptist)	St John the Baptist, Burley		Hon. Priest-in-Charge: Angie Gammon	1,760	
Burton (St Luke) and Sopley	St Luke, Burton; St Michael & All Angels, Sopley		Priest-in-Charge: Nigel Lacey	4,986	
Christchurch (Holy Trinity)	Holy Trinity, Christchurch; St George, Jumpers; St John, Purewell		Priest-in-Charge: Charles Stewart; Curate: Richard Partridge; Curate: Jon Evans; NSM: Angela Newton	18,114	
Highcliffe (St Mark)	St Mark, Highcliffe		Priest-in-Charge: Gillian Nobes	12,597	
Milton (St Mary Magdalene)	St Mary Magdalene, Milton; St Peter, Ashley; St John the Baptist, Bashley		Rector: Andrew Bailey	25,798	
Mudeford (All Saints)	All Saints, Mudeford; High Cross Church, Somerford		Priest-in-Charge: Andrew Jablonski; NSM: Anne Jablonski	12,390	
Fordingbridge (St Mary) and Hyde and Breamore and Hale With Woodgreen	St Mary, Breamore; St Mary, Fordingbridge; St Giles, Godshill; Sandleheath Uniting Church; St Mary, Hale; St Boniface, Woodgreen		Rector: Vacant; Curate: Tom Burden	8,527	
Fordingbridge (St Mary) and Hyde and Breamore and Hale With Woodgreen	Holy Ascension, Hyde		Rector: Vacant; Curate: Tom Burden	22,925	
Ringwood (St Peter and St Paul) with Ellingham and Harbridge and St Leonards and St Ives	SS Peter & Paul, Ringwood; St Paul, Bisterne; St Mary & All Saints, Ellingham; All Saints, Harbridge; St John, Poulner		Vicar: Matthew Trick; Curate: Ian Whitham	22,925	
Ringwood (St Peter and St Paul) with Ellingham and Harbridge and St Leonards and St Ives	All Saints, St Leonards & St Ives		Vicar: Matthew Trick; Curate: Ian Whitham	22,925	

=== Deanery of Eastleigh ===
Benefice	Churches	Link	Clergy	Population served	Ref
Bishopstoke (St Mary) (St Paul)	St Mary, Bishopstoke (MED); St Paul, Bishopstoke (1962)		Rector: Richard Wise; Curate: Kat Mepham (until June 2020)	11,548	
Boyatt Wood (St Peter)	St Peter, Boyatt Wood (1991)		Priest-in-Charge: Iain McFarlane	8,479	
Bursledon (St Leonard)	St Leonard, Bursledon (MED); St Paul, Pilands Wood (1958)		Vicar: John Pawson; Curate: Robert Sanday (see below)	6,734	
Chandler's Ford (St Boniface) (St Martin in the Wood)	St Boniface, Chandler's Ford; St Martin in the Wood, Chandler's Ford		Vicar: Ian Bird; Curate: Tony Palmer; Curate: Garry Roberts	23,137	
Eastleigh (All Saints)	All Saints, Eastleigh; St Francis, Eastleigh		Priest-in-Charge: Ian Fletcher	16,547	
Fair Oak (St Thomas)	St Thomas, Fair Oak		Vicar: Ali Mepham (until July 2020); Curate: Kat Mepham (until June 2020); NSM: Bob Nicholls	8,639	
Hamble Le Rice (St Andrew)	St Andrew, Hamble (MED)		Priest-in-Charge: Graham Whiting; Curate: Robert Sanday (see below)	4,692	
Hedge End (St John the Evangelist)	St John the Evangelist, Hedge End (1874)		Vicar: Chris Rowberry; NSM: Shan Litjens; NSM: Karen Rowberry	12,916	
Hedge End (St Luke)	St Luke, Hedge End		Priest-in-Charge: Fiona Gibbs; NSM: Hayley Richens	9,051	
Hound (St Edward the Confessor) (St Mary the Virgin)	St Edward the Confessor, Netley; St Mary the Virgin, Hound (MED)		Priest-in-Charge: Robert Sanday	6,371	
North Stoneham (St Nicholas) (All Saints) and Bassett	St Nicolas, North Stoneham; All Saints, Winchester Road; St Michael & All Angels, Bassett		Rector: Vacant; NSM: Rogelio Prieto-Duran	12,887	
Valley Park (St Francis)	St Francis, Valley Park		Lead Minister: PJ Brombley	8,455	
West End (St James)	St James, West End (1834)		Priest-in-Charge: Vacant; NSM: Linda Galvin	16,773	

=== Deanery of Lyndhurst ===
Benefice	Churches	Link	Clergy	Population served	Ref
Beaulieu (Blessed Virgin and Holy Child) and Exbury and East Boldre	Blessed Virgin & Holy Child, Beaulieu (MED); St Mary, Bucklers Hard (1880s); St Paul, East Boldre (1839); St Katherine, Exbury (MED)		Vicar: John White	1,801	
Boldre (St John the Baptist) with South Baddesley	St John the Baptist, Boldre (MED); St Nicholas, Pilley; St Mary the Virgin, South Baddesley (pre-1858)		Vicar: Vacant; Curate (Brockenhurst): Yuet-Yee Nicholson; NSM (Boldre): Richard Elliott; Hon. Curate (Boldre): Andrew Neaum; Hon. Curate (Brockenhurst): Richard Drown	5,355	
Brockenhurst (St Nicholas) (St Saviour)	St Nicholas, Brockenhurst; St Saviour, Brockenhurst		Vicar: Vacant; Curate (Brockenhurst): Yuet-Yee Nicholson; NSM (Boldre): Richard Elliott; Hon. Curate (Boldre): Andrew Neaum; Hon. Curate (Brockenhurst): Richard Drown	5,355	
Colbury (Christ Church)	Christ Church, Colbury (1870)		Priest-in-Charge: Graham Mayer	2,227	
Dibden (All Saints)	All Saints, Dibden (MED); St Andrew, Dibden Purlieu		Rector: John Currin; Curate: Peter Stark Toller	13,101	
Fawley (All Saints)	All Saints, Fawley; St George, Calshot; Good Shepherd, Holbury; St Francis, Langley		Priest-in-Charge: Vacant	14,310	
Hordle (All Saints)	All Saints, Hordle; St Andrew, Tiptoe		Vicar: Paul Taylor; Curate: Simon Robertson; NSM: Elizabeth Bennett	4,652	
Hythe (St John the Baptist)	St John the Baptist, Hythe; St Anne, Hythe Butts Ash		Vicar: Lee Davies	7,425	
Lymington (St Thomas the Apostle) (All Saints)	St Thomas the Apostle, Lymington; All Saints, Woodside		Vicar: Lee Thompson	9,238	
Lyndhurst (St Michael) and Emery Down and Minstead	Christ Church, Emery Down; St Michael, Lyndhurst; All Saints, Minstead		Priest-in-Charge: David Potterton	3,928	
Marchwood (St John)	St John the Apostle, Marchwood		Priest-in-Charge: Simon Hones	6,185	
Milford-On-Sea (All Saints)	All Saints, Milford-on-Sea; St Mary, Everton		Vicar: Dominic Furness	6,088	
Pennington (St Mark)	St Mark, Pennington		Priest-in-Charge: Rachel Noel; NSM: Anne Elliott	6,127	
Sway (St Luke)	St Luke, Sway		Vicar: Vacant	3,065	
Totton, Comprising Calmore, Eling, Netley Marsh, and Testwood	St Anne, Calmore; St Mary, Eling; St Matthew, Netley Marsh; St Winfrid, Testwood		Team Rector (Totton): Chris Steed; Team Vicar (Totton): Sally Marchant; Team Vicar/Priest-in-Charge: John Reeve; Curate (Totton): Graeme Dixon	33,642	
Copythorne (St Mary)	St Mary, Copythorne		Team Rector (Totton): Chris Steed; Team Vicar (Totton): Sally Marchant; Team Vicar/Priest-in-Charge: John Reeve; Curate (Totton): Graeme Dixon	33,642	

=== Deanery of Romsey ===
Benefice	Churches	Link	Clergy	Population served	Ref
Ampfield (St Mark), Chilworth and N Baddesley	St Mark, Ampfield (1838); St Denys, Chilworth (MED); St John the Baptist, North Baddesley (MED); All Saints, North Baddesley (1950s)		Vicar: Victoria Ashdown; NSM: Vanessa Lawrence	8,870	
Broughton (St Mary) with Bossington and Houghton and Mottisfont	St Mary, Broughton; St James, Bossington; All Saints, Houghton; St Andrew, Mottisfont		Rector: Vacant	1,877	
Lockerley (St John) and East Dean with East and West Tytherley	St John, Lockerley; St Peter, East Tytherley; St Winifred, East Dean; St Peter, West Tytherley		Vicar: James Pitkin	1,781	
Michelmersh (Our Lady) and Awbridge and Braishfield and Farley Chamberlayne and Timsbury	Our Lady, Michelmersh; St Andrew, Timsbury; All Saints, Awbridge; All Saints, Braishfield; St John, Farley Chamberlayne		Rector: Stephen Pittis; NSM: Jane Thompson	2,370	
Nursling (St Boniface) and Rownhams	St Boniface, Nursling; St John the Evangelist, Rownhams		Rector: Julian Williams	5,218	
Romsey (St Mary and St Ethelflaeda)	SS Mary & Ethelflaeda, Romsey; St Swithun, Crampmoor		Vicar: Thomas Wharton; Asst Priest: Sally Womersley; Curate: Lee Thompson; NSM: David Williams; NSM: Bryan Taphouse; NSM: Paul Hollingworth	17,978	
Test Valley Benefice, The, Comprising Leckford, Longstock, Somborne with Ashley, and Stockbridge	St Nicholas, Leckford; St Mary, Longstock; SS Peter & Paul, Ashley; St Peter, Stockbridge; Old St Peter's, Stockbridge		Rector: Vacant	2,885	
Wellow, East with West (St Margaret) and Sherfield English	St Margaret, Wellow		Vicar: Chris Pettet	3,983	
Wellow, East with West (St Margaret) and Sherfield English	St Leonard, Sherfield English		Vicar: Chris Pettet	3,983	

=== Deanery of Southampton ===
Benefice	Churches	Link	Clergy	Population served	Ref
Bitterne (Holy Saviour)	Holy Saviour, Bitterne		Vicar: Vacant; NSM: Janet Parfitt	9,815	
Bitterne Park (All Hallows) (Ascension)	Ascension, Southampton		* Vicar: Simon Robertson: Associate Minister Peter Goodall	15,115	
Freemantle (Christ Church)	Christ Church, Freemantle		Rector: Karen Linington	9,376	
Maybush All Saints and St. Peter's	St Peter's, Maybush; All Saints, Redbridge		Priest-in-Charge: Jane Bakker	26,036	
Portswood (Christ Church)	Highfield Church (1846)		Vicar: Mike Archer; Associate Vicar: Sarah Archer		
St Denys	St Denys Church		* Priest-in-Charge: Sera Rumble		
Shirley (St James) (St John)	St James by the Park, Shirley; St John, Shirley		Priest-in-Charge: Daniel Clark; NSM: Lena Phillips	17,326	
Sholing (St Francis of Assisi) (St Mary)	St Mary, Sholing		Vicar: Garry Roberts; Curate: Jon Oliver; Curate: Nicola Smith (see above); Curate: Hasna Khatun	19,679	
Southampton (St Mark)	St Mark, Southampton		Priest-in-Charge: Marc Allez; Associate Priest: Georgia Condell	11,087	
Woolston (St Mark)	St Mark, Woolston (1863)		Vicar/Priest-in-Charge: Miles Newton	13,248	
Southampton (St Mary Extra)	Pear Tree Church, Southampton		Vicar/Priest-in-Charge: Miles Newton	13,248	
Southampton (Saint Mary's)	St Mary, Southampton; Saint Mary's Lodge Road		Priest-in-Charge: Jon Finch; Associate Minister: Katy Horne	27,985	
Southampton (St Michael the Archangel)	St Michael, Southampton		Vicar: David Deboys; NSM: Phil Hand; NSM: Jacqueline Sellin	27,985	
Southampton Lord's Hill and Lord's Wood	Lord's Hill Church		Vicar: Tom Boulter	11,349	
Southampton Thornhill (St Christopher)	St Christopher, Thornhill		Priest-in-Charge: Duncan Jennings; NSM: Matthew Renshaw	10,127	
Swaythling (St Mary) (St Alban the Martyr)	St Alban the Martyr, Southampton; St Mary, South Stoneham		Vicar: Peter Dockree	14,998	
Weston (Holy Trinity)	Holy Trinity, Weston		Priest-in-Charge: Daron Medway	8,795	
