= Debbie Sellin =

British Anglican bishop and Lord Spiritual (born 1964)

The Right Reverend Deborah Sellin
- Bishop of Peterborough
- Church: Church of England
- Diocese: Peterborough
- In office: 13 December 2023 to present
- Predecessor: Donald Allister
- Previous posts: acting Bishop of Winchester (2021–2023); Bishop of Southampton (2019–2023)

Orders
- Ordination: 2007 (deacon); 2008 (priest)
- Consecration: 3 July 2019 by Justin Welby

Personal details
- Born: 1 October 1964 (age 62) Dumfries, Scotland, UK
- Denomination: Anglicanism
- Education: University of St Andrews

Member of the House of Lords
- Lord Spiritual
- Bishop of Peterborough; 30 January 2025

Deborah Mary Sellin (born 1 October 1964) is a Church of England bishop serving as Bishop of Peterborough since 2023. She was previously Bishop of Southampton, a suffragan bishop in the Diocese of Winchester, and acted as diocesan Bishop of Winchester.

== Early life and education ==
Sellin is originally from Scotland, and was born in Dumfries on 1 October 1964. She studied at the University of St Andrews, graduating with an undergraduate Master of Arts (MA Hons) degree in 1986. She worked as a manager in the National Health Service (NHS) and then as a family and children's worker. She trained for ordination with the Southern Theological Education and Training Scheme between 2004 and 2007.

== Ordained ministry ==
Sellin was ordained as a deacon at Petertide 2007 (1 July), ordained as a priest at the Petertide following (28 June 2008) – both times by Christopher Hill, Bishop of Guildford, at Guildford Cathedral – and served all her parish ministry in the Diocese of Guildford. She was a Non-Stipendiary Minister at St Saviour, Guildford, from 2007 to 2010, then Vicar of Wonersh from 2010 to 2019 and also Area Dean of Cranleigh from 2015 to 2019. In 2018 she was made an Honorary Canon of Guildford Cathedral.

=== Episcopal ministry ===
In April 2019, it was announced that Sellin would be the next Bishop of Southampton; she legally took up her role on 3 July 2019, the day of her consecration by Justin Welby, Archbishop of Canterbury, at St Paul's Cathedral.

On 20 May 2021 it was reported that Tim Dakin, Bishop of Winchester, had "stepped back" as diocesan bishop for six weeks, in light of the threat of a diocesan synod motion of no confidence in his leadership. David Williams, Bishop of Basingstoke, the other suffragan bishop, also "stepped back" (he was said to be in sympathy with the protesters) and Sellin served as acting diocesan bishop. The "stepping back" was later extended and on 16 July Dakin announced that he would retire in February 2022; meanwhile, Sellin continued as acting diocesan bishop. On 11 January 2022 the Archbishop of Canterbury announced that Sellin would continue as acting diocesan bishop during the vacancy following Dakin's formal retirement on 6 February 2022. She remained so until 10 October 2023 when Philip Mounstephen was confirmed as Bishop of Winchester and formally took up his appointment.

On 28 September 2023, Sellin was announced as the next Bishop of Peterborough, to be installed in early 2024. She legally took up the See upon the confirmation, on 13 December 2023 at Lambeth Palace Chapel, of her election.

Sellin was introduced to the House of Lords on 30 January 2025.
