= Alresford =

Alresford may refer to:

- Alresford, Essex, a village in Essex, England
- New Alresford, a small town in Hampshire, England
- Old Alresford, a village in Hampshire, England
- Alresford Cricket Club, which represented New Alresford and Old Alresford in the late 18th century
- Deanery of Alresford, which includes New Alresford and Old Alresford and other parishes
