= David Williams (bishop of Truro) =

Church of England Bishop (born 1961)

The Right Reverend David Williams
- Bishop of Truro
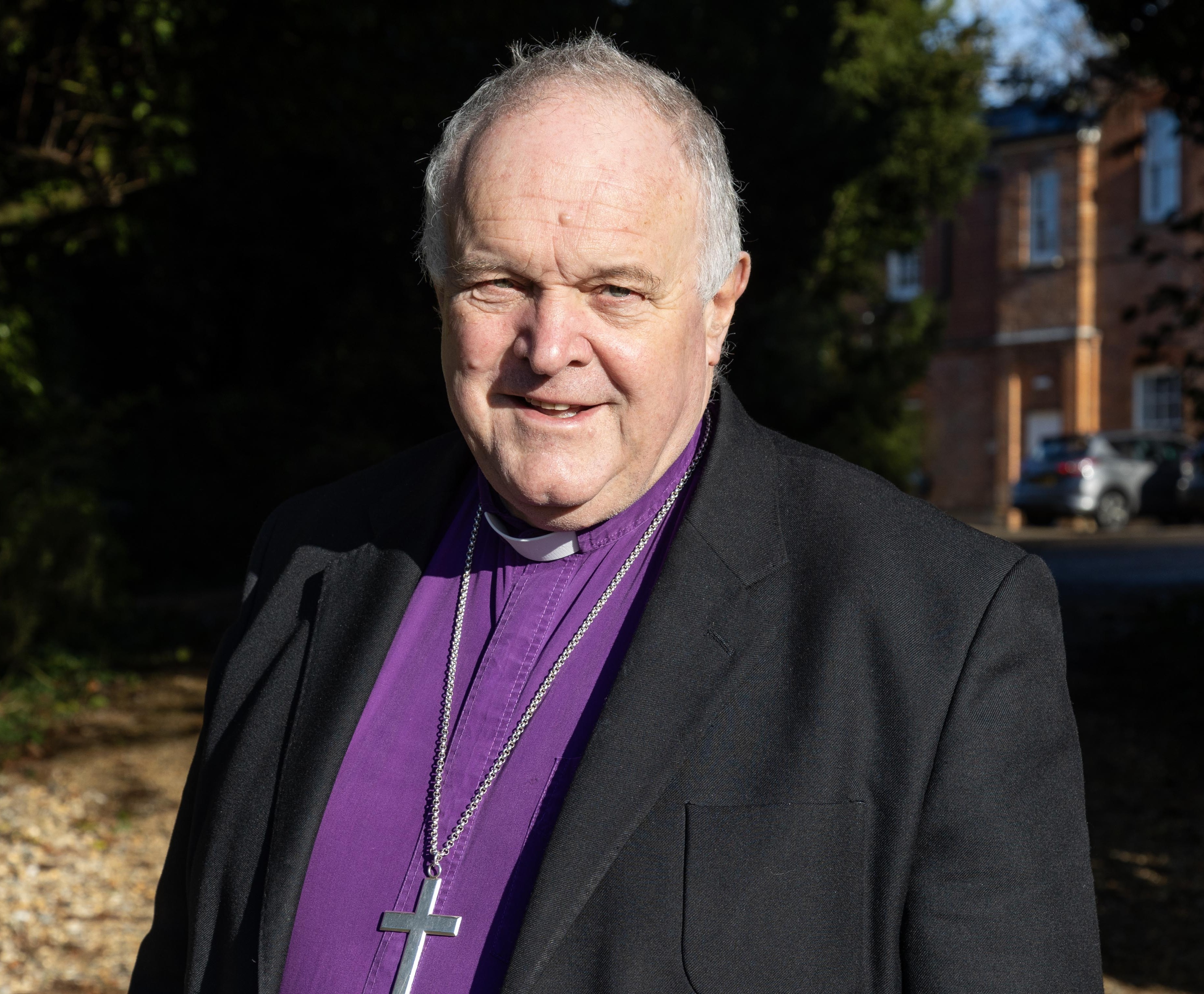
- Williams in 2024
- Church: Church of England
- Diocese: Truro
- In office: 2025 to present
- Predecessor: Philip Mounstephen
- Previous posts: Bishop of Basingstoke (2014–2025); Vicar of Christ Church, Winchester (2002–2014)

Orders
- Ordination: 1989
- Consecration: 19 September 2014 by Justin Welby

Personal details
- Born: David Grant Williams; 16 April 1961 (age 65)
- Denomination: Anglican
- Spouse: Helen (m. 1986)
- Children: 2
- Education: University of Bristol; Wycliffe Hall, Oxford

David Grant Williams (born 16 April 1961) is a Church of England Bishop who is the current Bishop of Truro; he was previously the Bishop of Basingstoke, a suffragan bishop in the Diocese of Winchester. Before his consecration in 2014, he was vicar of Christ Church, Winchester. He studied social policy at the University of Bristol and was ordained in 1989.

== Early life ==
Williams was born on 16 April 1961 in Reading, England, and spend his childhood in Uganda. He was educated at Newport Free Grammar School, then a grammar school in Newport, Essex. He studied social policy at the University of Bristol, graduating with a Bachelor of Social Science (BSocSc) degree.

After university, he spent a number of years working in Kenya with the Church Mission Society. Along with his missionary work, he was deputy head of a secondary school in eastern Kenya. He returned to the UK and served as a lay assistant at Christ Church Clifton, Bristol, from 1985 to 1986. He then went on to study for ordination at Wycliffe Hall, Oxford, between 1986 and 1989.

== Ordained ministry ==
Williams was ordained in the Church of England as a deacon in 1989 and as a priest in 1990. He began his ordained ministry as a curate at All Saints Church, Ecclesall, in the Diocese of Sheffield from 1989 to 1992. He was then vicar of Christ Church, Dore, before being appointed Rural Dean of Ecclesall in 1997. In 2002, he became the vicar of Christ Church, Winchester. During his time at Christ Church, he also served the wider community: he set up the city's street pastors project, and made visits to Winchester Prison, to the Royal Hampshire County Hospital and to the University of Winchester. In 2012, he was appointed an honorary canon of Winchester Cathedral.

He was elected to the General Synod of the Church of England in 2010. As a priest, he joined the House of Clergy. In 2012, he was appointed chair of the House of Clergy of the Winchester diocesan synod. He stood down from these appointments upon becoming a bishop.

=== Episcopal ministry ===
In June 2014, it was announced that he would be the next Bishop of Basingstoke, a suffragan bishop in the Diocese of Winchester. On 19 September 2014, he was consecrated a bishop at Winchester Cathedral by Justin Welby, Archbishop of Canterbury. He celebrated his first service as bishop at St Michael's Church, Basingstoke, on 28 September 2014.

On 20 May 2021, it was reported that Tim Dakin, Bishop of Winchester, had "stepped back" as diocesan bishop for six weeks, in light of the threat of a diocesan synod motion of no confidence in his leadership. Williams also "stepped back" and Debbie Sellin, Bishop of Southampton, served as acting diocesan bishop. Williams' leave was later extended to the end of August 2021.

On 11 December 2024, the Prime Minister's Office announced that Williams was to be the next Bishop of Truro. He was translated by the confirmation of his election, at St Mary-le-Bow on 28 March 2025.

== Personal life ==
In 1986, Williams married Helen Pacey. They have one daughter and one son, Sarah and Mark.

Church of England titles
Preceded by Peter Hancock	Bishop of Basingstoke; 2014–2025	TBA
Preceded by Philip Mounstephen	Bishop of Truro; 2025–present	Incumbent
