= Christ Church, Winchester =

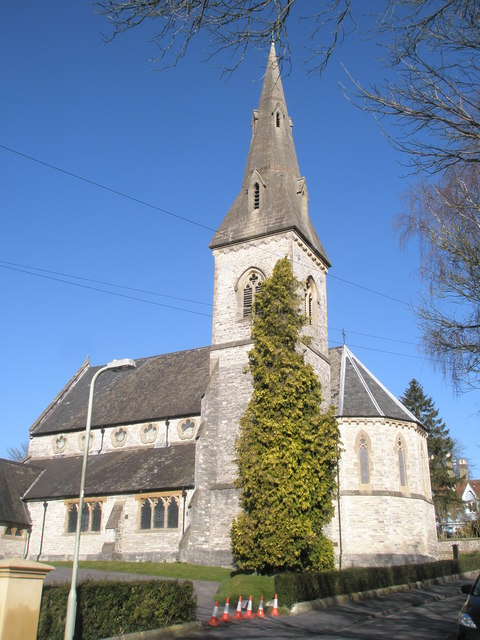

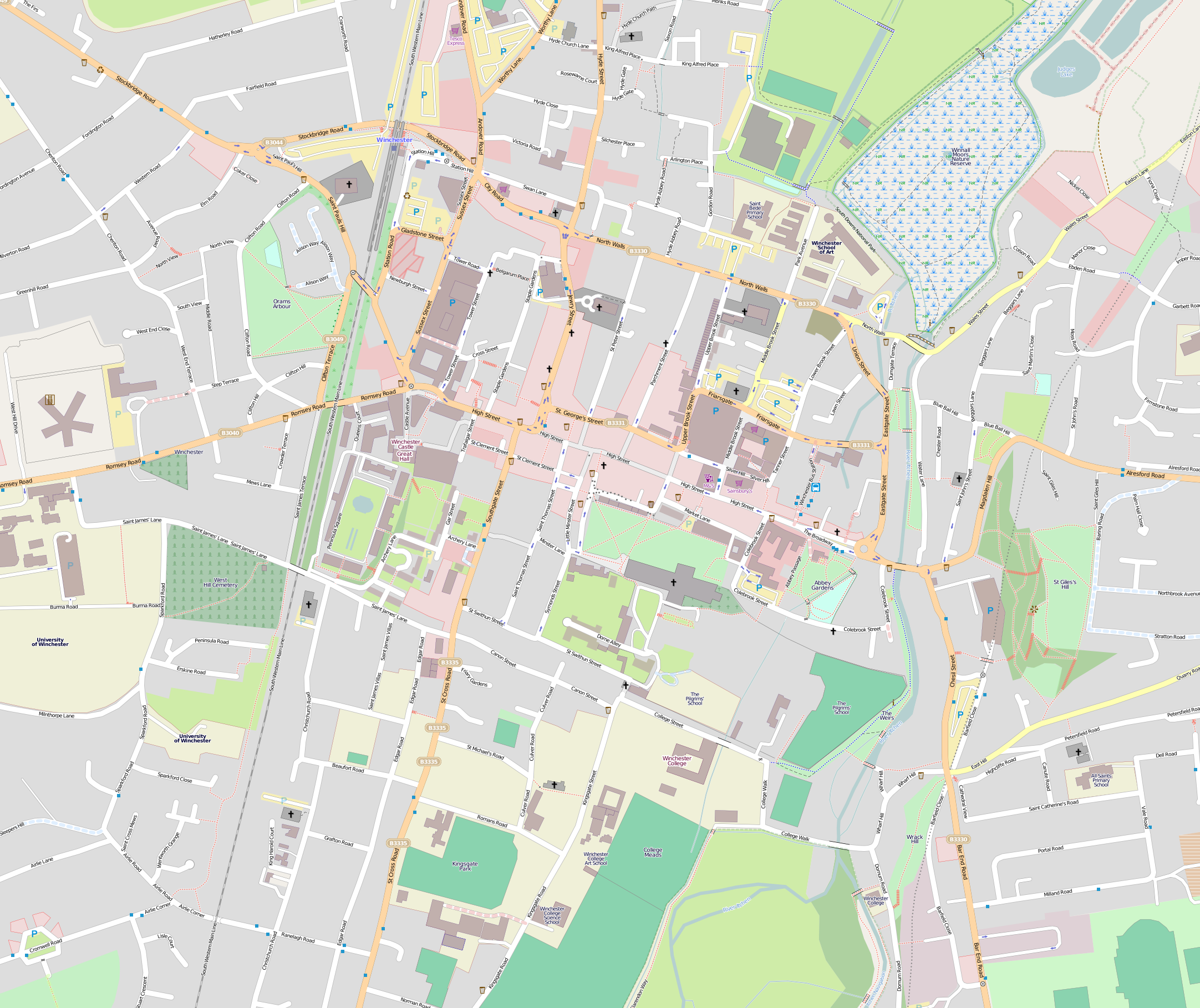
- Location within Central Winchester
- 51°03′37.1″N 1°19′19.4″W
- OS grid reference: SU 47606 29215
- Country: England
- Denomination: Church of England
- Churchmanship: Evangelical
- Website: www.ccwinch.org.uk

Architecture
- Architect: Ewan Christian
- Style: "High Victorian Early English"
- Years built: 1859–61

Administration
- Province: Province of Canterbury
- Diocese: Diocese of Winchester
- Deanery: Winchester

Clergy
- Vicar: The Revd Simon Cansdale

Christ Church, Winchester is a Church of England parish church in Winchester, England. There are approximately 475 members on the electoral roll. It is also in partnership with the diocese of Muhabura and with St Nicholas Church in Kaleerwe, Kampala, both in Uganda.

== Activity ==
Christ Church has links with, and provides support to, institutions within the parish, including the Royal Hampshire County Hospital, Winchester Prison and the University of Winchester. It is an active participant in Churches Together Winchester, which supports the Winchester Night Shelter, Basics Bank and Street Pastors.

== Current clergy ==
Simon Cansdale is the vicar, having been installed in November 2019. James Whymark, Clare Carson and Marianne Foster are all curates, and Brian Wakelin and Amanda Denniss are assistant ministers.

== Previous clergy ==
A previous vicar, David Williams, became Bishop of Basingstoke on 19 September 2014.
