= Peter Hancock (bishop) =

British Anglican bishop (born 1955)

The Right Reverend Peter Hancock
- Bishop of Bath and Wells
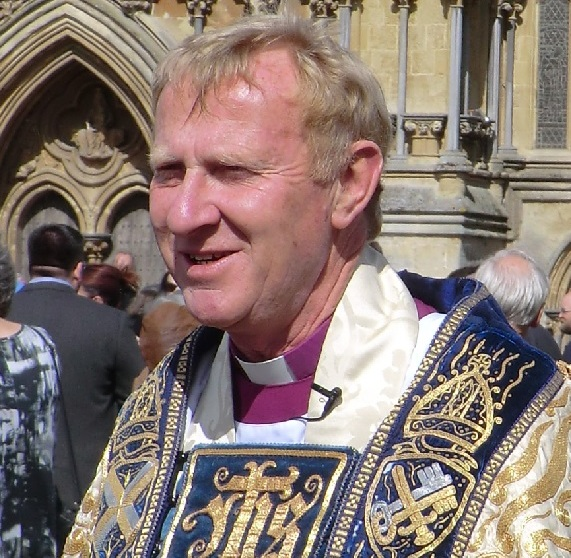
- Hancock after his Installation at Wells
- Church: Church of England
- Diocese: Diocese of Bath and Wells
- In office: 2014–2021
- Predecessor: Peter Price
- Other post: Bishop of Basingstoke (2010–2014)

Orders
- Ordination: 1980 (deacon); 1981 (priest) by Ronald Gordon
- Consecration: 21 September 2010

Personal details
- Born: 26 July 1955 (age 71) Isle of Wight, United Kingdom
- Denomination: Anglican
- Residence: Bishop's Palace, Wells
- Spouse: (m. 1979)
- Children: four
- Education: Selwyn College, Cambridge

Peter Hancock (born 26 July 1955) is a retired Church of England bishop. He served as the Bishop of Bath and Wells from 2014 to 2021, having previously been the Bishop of Basingstoke, a suffragan bishop in the Diocese of Winchester, from 2010 to 2014.

== Early life and education ==
Hancock was born on 26 July 1955 in Kent and grew up on the Isle of Wight. His family moved to Fareham, Hampshire, when he was eleven. He took a first degree at Selwyn College, Cambridge, before training for the ordained ministry at Oak Hill Theological College.

== Ordained ministry ==
Hancock was ordained in the Church of England: made a deacon at Michaelmas, 28 September 1980, and ordained a priest the Michaelmas following, 27 September 1981, both times by Ronald Gordon, Bishop of Portsmouth, at Portsmouth Cathedral. He was a curate at Christchurch, Portsdown, between 1980 and 1983, and at Saint Aldhelm, Radipole, until 1987. From 1987 to 1999 he was Vicar of St Wilfrid's Cowplain before becoming Archdeacon of The Meon — a post he held until his ordination to the episcopate.

=== Episcopal ministry ===
Hancock was consecrated as a bishop at St Paul's Cathedral on 21 September 2010, and welcomed as Bishop of Basingstoke at Winchester Cathedral on 2 October 2010.

On 10 December 2013, it was announced that Hancock would become Bishop of Bath and Wells in 2014. Initially it was stated that, unlike his predecessors, he would not live in the Bishop's Palace. However, that decision was later reversed. His election as Bishop of Bath and Wells was confirmed on 4 March 2014 and he was installed at Wells Cathedral on 7 June 2014. From 2016 to 2020, he was additionally lead bishop for safeguarding in the Church of England.

From August 2020, Hancock was on leave while undergoing treatment for cancer. It was announced in March 2021 that he was recovering from leukaemia but would be taking retirement on medical grounds; a farewell service was held on 22 May 2021. He retired to Surrey.

== Personal life ==
Hancock married in 1979, and he and his wife have four adult children.

In 2020, Hancock was diagnosed with acute myeloid leukaemia and took leave to undergo treatment.

== Views ==
In his first interview after being installed as the Bishop of Bath and Wells, Hancock said about same-sex marriage on Radio Bristol: "I think marriage is a gift from God. It's a means of grace and his way of blessing us. I believe this was set aside for a man and a woman." In an article in the Bath Chronicle, he said "We will therefore need to think, pray and consider very deeply what it might mean to share the gospel across the diocese, what it might mean to foster spiritual and numerical growth in Church and community, and how we can so order our life as a diocese to enable the Church to grow and flourish in new ways."

== Styles ==
- The Reverend Peter Hancock (1980–1997)
- The Reverend Canon Peter Hancock (1997–1999)
- The Venerable Peter Hancock (1999–2010)
- The Right Reverend Peter Hancock (2010–present)

Church of England titles
| Preceded by Inaugural appointment | Archdeacon of The Meon; 1999–2010 | Succeeded by Gavin Collins |
| Preceded by Trevor Willmott | Bishop of Basingstoke; 2010–2014 | Succeeded by David Williams |
| Preceded by Peter Price | Bishop of Bath and Wells; 2014–2021 | TBA |
