= Ewhurst =

Ewhurst may refer to the following places in England:

- Ewhurst, East Sussex
- Ewhurst, Hampshire
- Ewhurst, Surrey
