= Kelly Betteridge =

British Anglican priest

Kelly Anne Betteridge (born 1969) is a British Anglican bishop, currently served as the Bishop of Basingstoke, a suffragan bishop in the Diocese of Winchester. Previously, she was the Archdeacon of Bodmin in the Diocese of Truro, having held that position from May 2021 until October 2025.

Betteridge studied education and theology at the Roehampton Institute, and graduated with a Bachelor of Arts (BA) degree in 1992. She was a youth and children's worker, and then worked for the Church Pastoral Aid Society (CPAS), an evangelical Anglican mission agency.

Having trained for ordination at Queen's College, Birmingham, she was ordained in the Church of England as a deacon in 2010 and as a priest in 2011. She served her curacy at St Nicolas Church in Nuneaton in the Diocese of Coventry from 2010 to 2014. She was then vicar of the same church and priest-in-charge of Weddington and Caldecote. After being announced as the next Archdeacon of Bodmin in the Diocese of Truro in January 2021, she was licensed as archdeacon during a service at St Petroc's Church, Bodmin on 23 May 2021. She was also director of intergenerational church initiatives for the diocese.

Betteridge was consecrated to the episcopate on 15 October 2025; on that day she became Bishop of Basingstoke. The service was held at Southwark Cathedral and the principal consecrator was Sarah Mullally, Bishop of London.
