= Tim Dakin =

British Anglican bishop (born 1958)

The Right Reverend Tim Dakin
- Bishop of Winchester
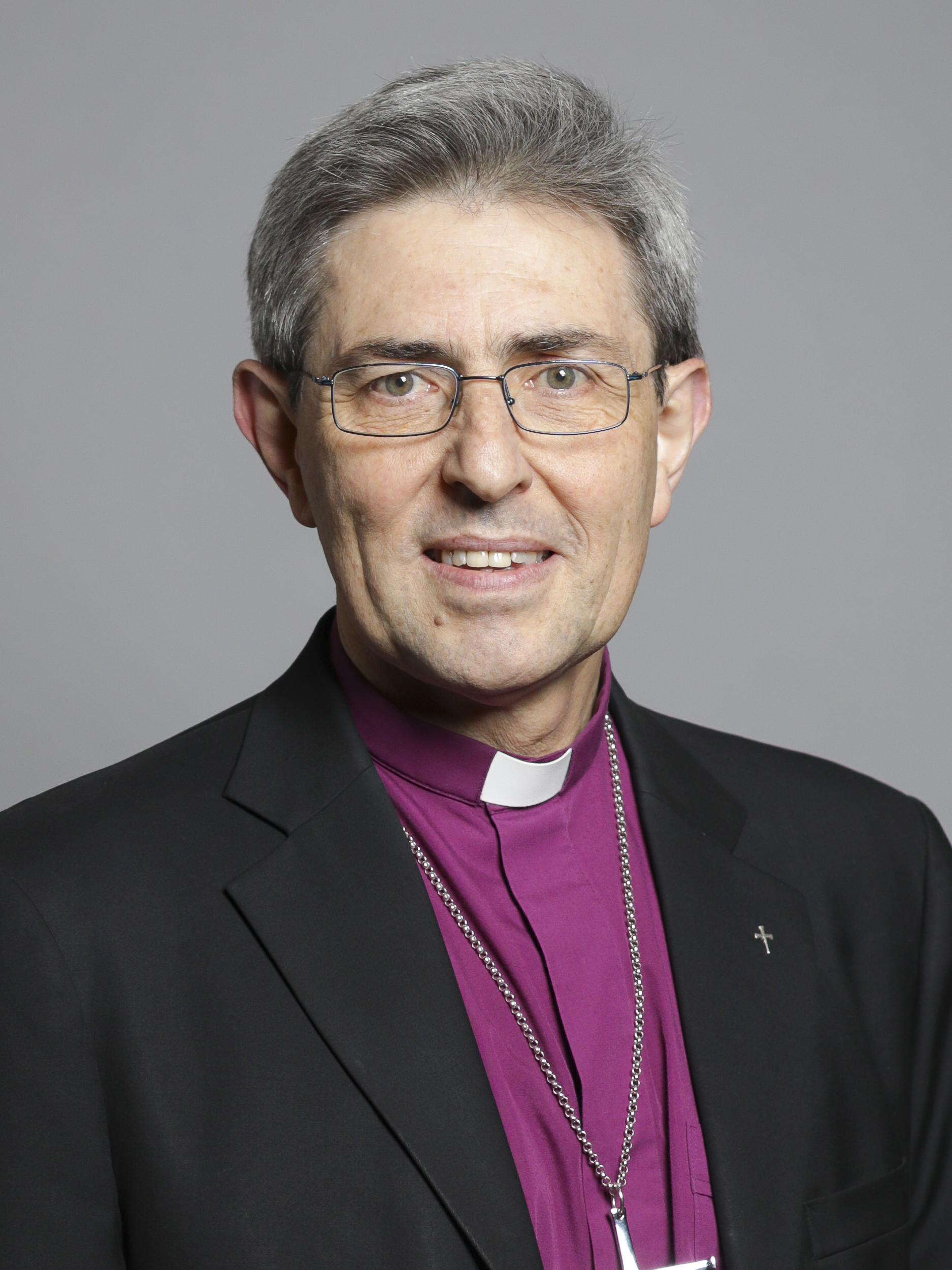
- Dakin in 2019
- Church: Church of England
- Diocese: Winchester
- In office: 2011–2022
- Predecessor: Michael Scott-Joynt
- Successor: Philip Mounstephen
- Other posts: Bishop for Higher and Further Education (2013–2022); General secretary, CMS (2000–2011)

Orders
- Ordination: 1993 (deacon); 1994 (priest)
- Consecration: 25 January 2012 by Rowan Williams

Personal details
- Born: 6 February 1958 (age 68) Kongwa, Tanganyika
- Denomination: Anglican
- Spouse: Sally
- Children: 2
- Occupation: Bishop
- Education: University College of St Mark and St John; King's College London

Member of the House of Lords
- Lord Spiritual
- Ex officio as Bishop of Winchester; 26 March 2012 – 6 February 2022

Timothy John Dakin (born 6 February 1958) is a British retired Anglican bishop. He was the general secretary of the Church Mission Society (CMS) and the South American Missionary Society (SAMS) prior to his consecration. He was appointed as Bishop of Winchester in 2011 and, as such, became an ex officio member of the House of Lords. From 2013 he was the Bishop for Higher and Further Education.

In May 2021, Dakin "stepped back" as diocesan bishop, in response to the threat of a motion of no confidence in his leadership in the diocesan synod, and Debbie Sellin, Bishop of Southampton, became the acting Bishop of Winchester. In July 2021, Dakin announced his retirement as bishop with effect from February 2022.

== Early life and education ==
Dakin was born in Kongwa, Tanganyika (modern Tanzania), where his parents were church missionaries working in Tanzania and Kenya. In the Church of England Year Book, he states that he was educated at St Mary's School, Nairobi, Kenya, but was otherwise educated in England at The Priory Grammar School for Boys, Shrewsbury and Henley Sixth Form College. However, in Who's Who, he states "Schools in Tanzania and Kenya" as his education, with no mention of the English schools. He studied theology and philosophy at the University College of St Mark and St John in Plymouth, graduating with a Bachelor of Arts (BA) degree in 1986. He then studied at King's College London, graduating with a Master of Theology (MTh) degree in 1987.

== Ordained ministry ==
His autobiographical details refer to ordinations in 1993 and 1994; he does not appear to have served his title in the usual way, an appointment as principal of the Church Army training college in Nairobi, a post previously held by his father, the Revd Stanley Dakin. During this time he was also an assistant curate at All Saints' Cathedral, Nairobi. He took up his appointment as general secretary of the Church Mission Society (CMS) in 2000. During this time, he was also an honorary curate of St James the Great, Ruscombe in the Diocese of Oxford, Church of England. He was appointed honorary canon theologian at Coventry Cathedral in 2001.

=== Episcopal ministry ===
His appointment as Bishop of Winchester was announced on 6 September 2011 and he legally became bishop with the confirmation of his election on 20 December 2011, ahead of his 25 January consecration by Rowan Williams, Archbishop of Canterbury, at St Paul's Cathedral. His installation at Winchester Cathedral was on 21 April and he was introduced in the House of Lords on 26 March. After John Taylor in 1974, he was only the second priest to be consecrated directly to the See of Winchester since 1595. In May 2013, Dakin was additionally appointed the Bishop for Higher and Further Education, a national spokesperson role.

As Bishop of Winchester he was the visitor to five Oxford colleges including Magdalen College, Oxford, New College, Oxford, and St John's College, Oxford. He also held ex officio the position of prelate of the Order of the Garter.

=== Channel Islands controversy ===
The Channel Islands had been under the oversight of the bishops of Winchester since the 16th century. In 2013, Dakin commissioned a report (the Steel Report) into alleged abuse by Channel Islands clergy, which found that there should be no disciplinary action against anyone. The full content of the report has never been published.

In January 2014, it was announced that the Channel Islands would be temporarily removed from the oversight of the Bishop of Winchester, after relations between Dakin and the Deanery of Jersey broke down over the handling of the alleged abuse, and the suspension of the Dean of Jersey, Bob Key. The deaneries of Jersey and Guernsey were transferred to the direct oversight of the Archbishop of Canterbury, and the Dean of Jersey was reinstated, with Archbishop Justin Welby subsequently issuing an apology to the dean and his wife "for the hurt and the treatment that they had received".

In the face of continued poor relations, the Archbishop of Canterbury formed a special commission in June 2018, under the chairmanship of a former Bishop of London, Richard Chartres, to decide on a way forward. In a report prepared for a visiting delegation during the commission process, the standing committee of the Deanery of Guernsey wrote of its relationship with Dakin: "While the handling of the Jersey safeguarding issue may have been the trigger for the current position, it is not the only matter which has so seriously strained the relationship." The commission issued its conclusions in October 2019, stating of Dakin's original handling of the case that "The suspension of the Dean came as a seismic shock to the civic authorities and churchpeople in Jersey, and triggered a breakdown in trust between the Church and people in both Islands, and Winchester. Questions were immediately raised as to the propriety, and indeed legality, of the Bishop's actions." The final decision of the commission was that the Channel Islands should not return to the episcopal oversight of the Bishop of Winchester, but should instead be incorporated into the neighbouring Diocese of Salisbury as a new permanent arrangement for episcopal care. The new arrangement is for both the Jersey and Guernsey deaneries, as relations with Dakin had broken down across all the Channel Islands.

=== No confidence motion and retirement announcement ===
On 20 May 2021 it was reported that Dakin had "stepped back" as diocesan bishop for six weeks, in light of the threat of a diocesan synod motion of no confidence in his leadership. The motion stated "We do not have confidence in the diocesan bishop ... to lead by example, due to allegations of poor behaviour and mistreatment on his part of a number of individuals." The motion was not tabled, following Dakin's decision to "step back". The motion additionally described administrative and financial management in the diocese as "unfit for purpose".

David Williams, Dakin's suffragan Bishop of Basingstoke, also "stepped back", having been amongst those representing complaints to Lambeth Palace. Debbie Sellin, Bishop of Southampton, agreed to temporarily be acting diocesan bishop.

Dakin's period of "stepping back" was later extended to the end of August. The Church Times reported on 29 June that the facilitated conversations, or commentary upon them, had led to a wider discussion concerning "the culture of the diocese". On 16 July 2021 he announced his forthcoming retirement as bishop of the diocese effective February 2022. He stated that he would be "handing over his responsibilities to others" until his retirement formally took effect.

On 29 January 2022, at Evensong in Winchester Cathedral, Dakin laid down his pastoral staff in preparation for his formal retirement on 6 February 2022, his 64th birthday.

=== In retirement ===
Since 2022 he has held permission to officiate in the Diocese of Exeter; he is not an honorary assistant bishop in the diocese. He is also a co-opted member of the board of governors at Plymouth Marjon University, his alma mater, formerly known as the University of St Mark and St John.

== Views ==
Dakin was a committee member of the Evangelical Group of the General Synod of the Church of England. In March 2014, the group sent an email to its members about the introduction of same-sex marriage in England and Wales, saying that the committee members believed that "appropriate sacramental discipline should apply to those who choose to enter into any sexual relationship other than within marriage between a man and a woman". He has been described as having a "conservative theology".

== Personal life ==
Dakin is married to the Reverend Sally Dakin and they have two children, Anna and John. Reverend Sally Dakin held a diocesan appointment as the Bishop's Adviser on Spirituality. The son, John Dakin served as Chair of New Alresford Town Council, in Hampshire.

Non-profit organization positions
Preceded by	General Secretary of the Church Mission Society; 2000–2011	Succeeded by Philip Mounstephen as Executive Leader
Church of England titles
Preceded by Michael Scott-Joynt	Bishop of Winchester; 2012–2022	Succeeded by Philip Mounstephen
