= Trevor Willmott =

British bishop

The Right Reverend Trevor Willmott Honorary Assistant Bishop - Diocese of Bath and Wells
- Other posts: Bishop of Basingstoke (2002–2009); Bishop of Dover (2010–2019); Bishop of the Channel Islands (2019-2022)

Orders
- Ordination: 1974 (deacon) by John Hare; 1975 (priest) by Robert Runcie
- Consecration: 2002 by George Carey

Personal details
- Born: 29 March 1950 (age 76)
- Denomination: Anglican
- Spouse: Margaret (m. 1973)
- Children: one
- Education: St Peter's College, Oxford

Trevor Willmott (born 29 March 1950) is a British retired bishop in the Church of England. He was the Bishop of Basingstoke (one of two suffragan bishops in the Diocese of Winchester) from 2002 to 2009 and then Bishop of Dover (de facto diocesan bishop of the Diocese of Canterbury) from 2010 until his retirement in 2019. In retirement, he remains bishop for the Channel Islands.

== Early life and education ==
Willmott undertook an undergraduate degree at St Peter's College, Oxford. He studied for ordination at Fitzwilliam College and Westcott House, Cambridge.

== Ordained ministry ==
Willmott was made a deacon at Petertide 1974 (30 June), by John Hare, Bishop of Bedford, at St Mary's Church, Luton, and ordained a priest the Petertide following (6 July 1975), by Robert Runcie, Bishop of St Albans, at St Albans Cathedral. He was a curate at St George's Church, Parish of Norton, Letchworth Garden City in the Diocese of St Albans from 1974 to 1977. From 1978 to 1979, he was assistant chaplain of Oslo with Trondheim before moving to become the chaplain of Naples with Capri, Bari and Sorrento from 1979 to 1983. He was also officiating chaplain to the British and American forces in Southern Europe from 1979 to 1983. All of these appointments were in the Diocese in Europe.

In 1983, Willmott returned to the United Kingdom as rector of Ecton, Northamptonshire, and warden of the Peterborough diocesan retreat house at Ecton House. In addition to these positions, he became Diocesan Director of Ordinands and of Post-Ordination Training in 1986. He became a canon residentiary and precentor of Peterborough Cathedral in 1989 (remaining Diocesan Director of Ordinands and of Post-Ordination Training) until 1997, when he became a canon residentiary of Durham Cathedral and Archdeacon of Durham.

=== Episcopal ministry ===
On 8 May 2002, Willmott was consecrated a bishop by George Carey, Archbishop of Canterbury, at Southwark Cathedral. He succeeded Geoffrey Rowell as Bishop suffragan of Basingstoke (in the Diocese of Winchester) following Rowell's appointment as Bishop in Europe. He was installed as the Bishop of Basingstoke on 11 May 2002 at Winchester Cathedral. In 2010, he was translated to Dover. The bishop suffragan of Dover is legally delegated full responsibility for the Diocese of Canterbury, acting as diocesan bishop in place of the Archbishop of Canterbury (who is Primate of All England and first bishop in the Anglican Communion); Willmott was installed as the Bishop of Dover on 6 February 2010 at Canterbury Cathedral.

In January 2014, in an interim arrangement, Willmott was appointed to oversight of the Channel Islands (part of the Diocese of Winchester) following a breakdown of relations with the Bishop of Winchester over the handling of alleged abuse. Willmott retired on 12 May 2019. In retirement, he retains oversight of the Channel Islands and his commission as an honorary assistant bishop of the Diocese of Winchester.

== Styles ==
- The Reverend Trevor Willmott (1973–1989)
- The Reverend Canon Trevor Willmott (1989–1997)
- The Venerable Trevor Willmott (1997–2002)
- The Right Reverend Trevor Willmott (2002–present)

Church of England titles
Preceded by Derek Hodgson	Archdeacon of Durham; 1997–2002	Succeeded by Stephen Conway
Preceded by Geoffrey Rowell	Bishop of Basingstoke; 2002–2010	Succeeded by Peter Hancock
Preceded by Stephen Venner	Bishop of Dover; 2010–2019	Succeeded by Rose Hudson-Wilkin
