= Knights Enham =

Village and parish in Hampshire, England

Coordinates: 51.23129°N 1.48238°W

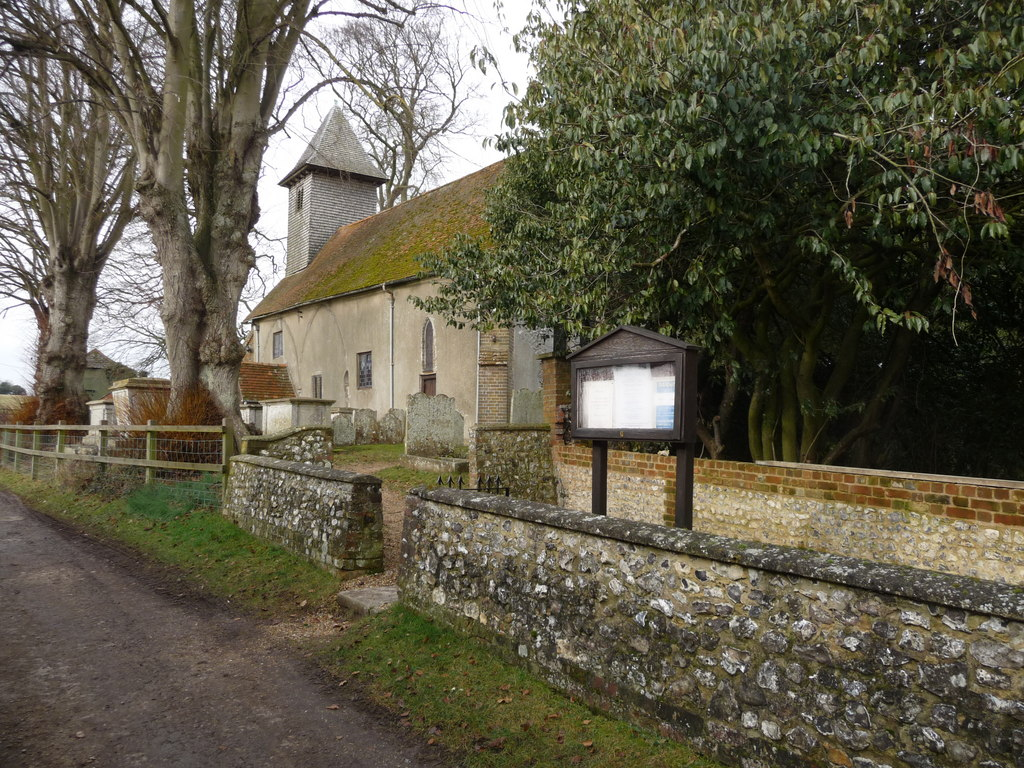
- Knights Enham - St Michael And All Angels

- Location within Hampshire
- OS grid reference: SU362481
- Civil parish: Enham Alamein
- District: Test Valley
- Shire county: Hampshire
- Region: South East
- Country: England
- Sovereign state: United Kingdom
- Post town: ANDOVER
- Postcode district: SP11
- Dialling code: 01264
- Police: Hampshire and Isle of Wight
- Fire: Hampshire and Isle of Wight
- Ambulance: South Central
- UK Parliament: North West Hampshire

Knights Enham is a small village and former civil parish, now in the parish of Enham Alamein, in the Test Valley district of Hampshire, England. It lies 1.4 miles (3.1 km) away from Andover. The parish had an area of 794 acres (321 ha). In 1931 the parish had a population of 391.

== History ==
On 25 March 1883 the parish was abolished and merged with Andover, in 1894 the parish was reformed from the rural part of Andover parish, on 1 April 1932 the parish was abolished and merged with Andover again.
