= Bishop of Basingstoke =

Anglican suffragan bishop in England

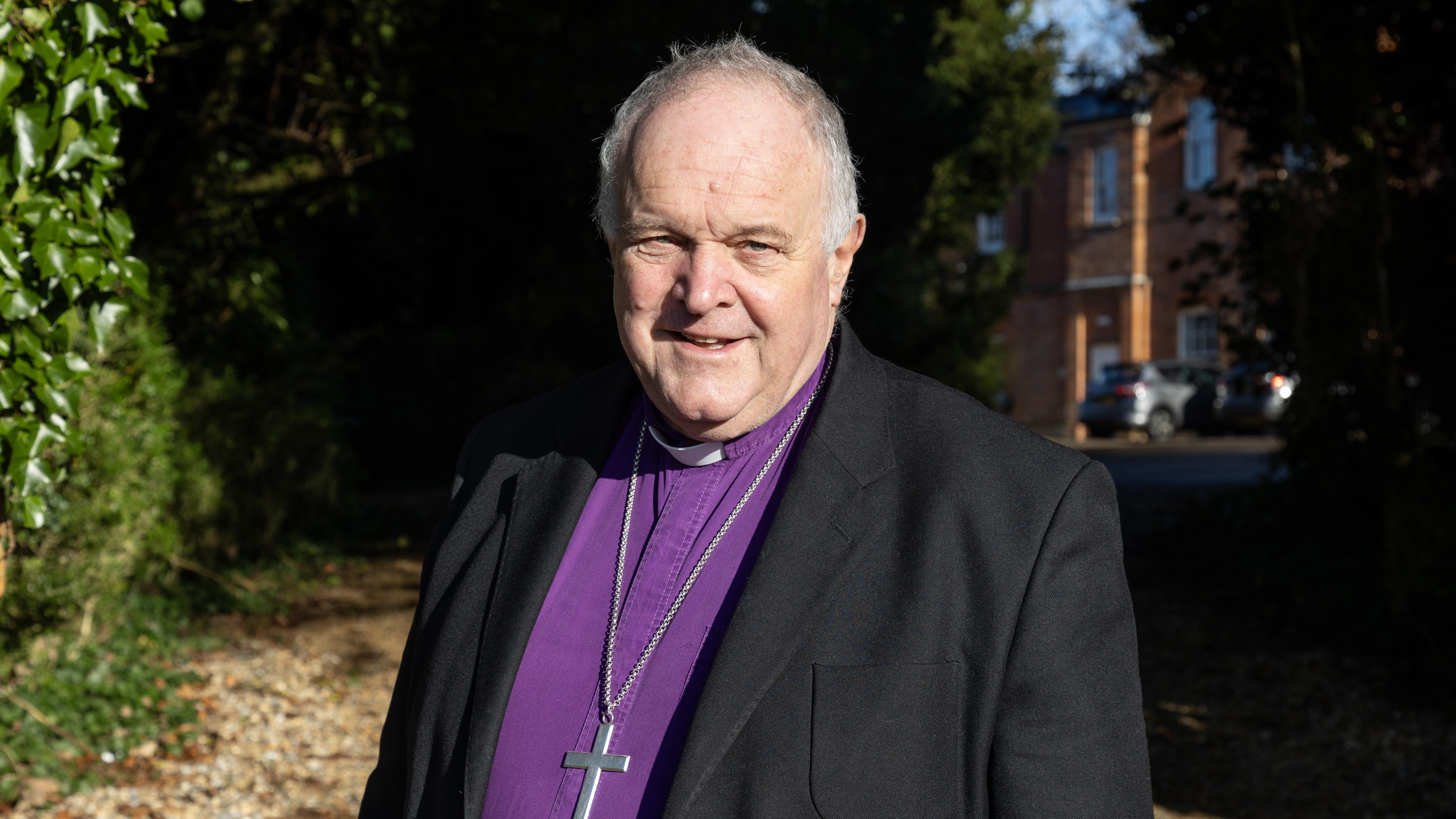
Bishop David Williams, Bishop of Basingstoke (2014-2025)

The Bishop of Basingstoke is an episcopal title used by a suffragan bishop of the Church of England Diocese of Winchester, in the province of Canterbury, England. The title takes its name after the town of Basingstoke in Hampshire.

== List of bishops ==
Bishops of Basingstoke
From	Until	Incumbent	Notes
1973	1977	Colin James	(1926–2009) Translated to Wakefield, and later to Winchester
1977	1993	Michael Manktelow	(1927–2017)
1994	2001	Geoffrey Rowell	(1943–2017) Translated to Gibraltar in Europe
2002	2009	Trevor Willmott	(b. 1950) Translated to Dover
2010	2014	Peter Hancock	(b. 1955) Translated to Bath and Wells
2014	2025	David Williams	(b. 1961) Formerly Vicar of Christ Church, Winchester; on leave, 20 May 2021–?; translated to Truro, 28 March 2025.
2025	present	Kelly Betteridge	Consecrated 15 October 2025.
