= Charlton, Hampshire =

Village and civil parish in England

Coordinates: 51.220525°N 1.49834°W

Charlton
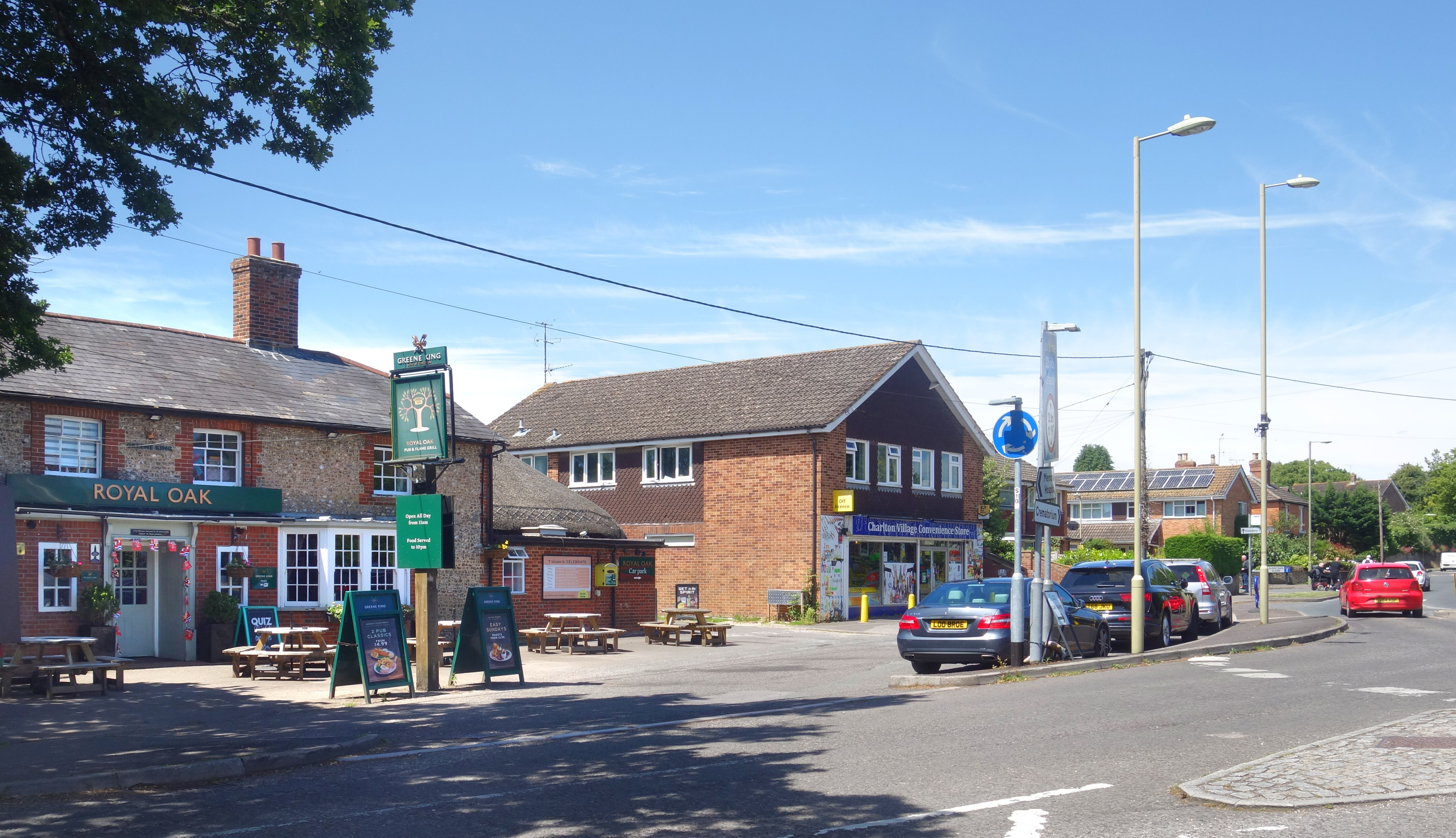

- Location within Hampshire
- Population: 1,947 (2011 Census including Foxcotte)
- District: Test Valley
- Shire county: Hampshire
- Region: South East
- Country: England
- Sovereign state: United Kingdom
- Post town: Andover
- Postcode district: SP10
- Dialling code: 01264
- Police: Hampshire and Isle of Wight
- Fire: Hampshire and Isle of Wight
- Ambulance: South Central
- UK Parliament: North West Hampshire

Charlton is a suburb of Andover. Due to the expansion of Andover in recent years the two settlements are now effectively contiguous. Charlton is separated from Andover by way of Charlton Park and Anton Lakes. This provides an effective natural gap. As of 2005, the village has a population of 2,053 people.

== History ==
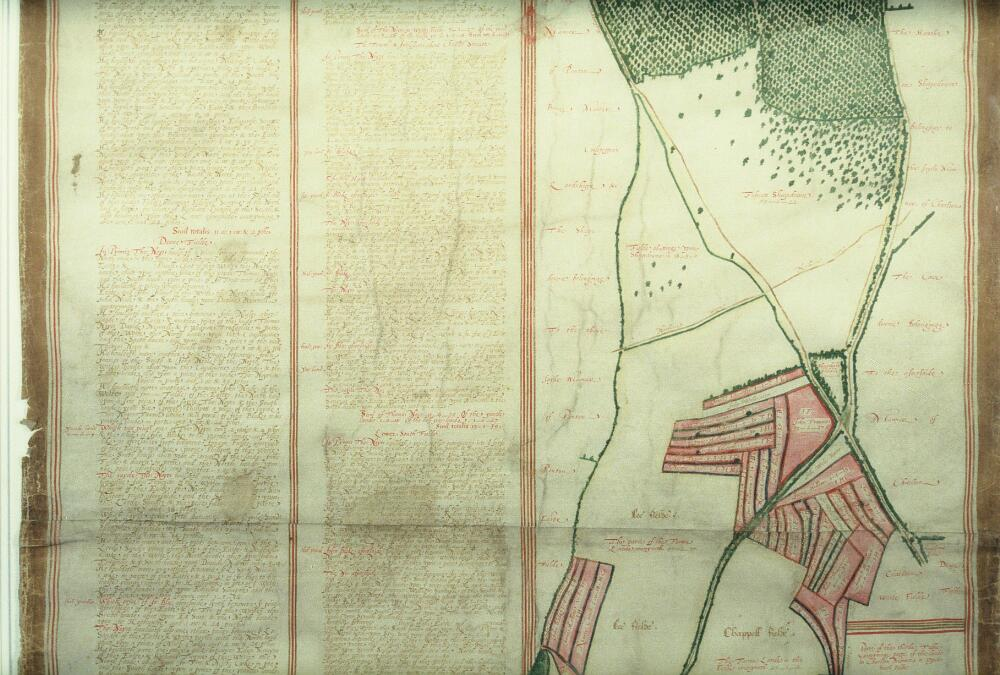
Estate map of Foxcotte Manor, near Andover 1614 onwards showing list of Charlton copyholders

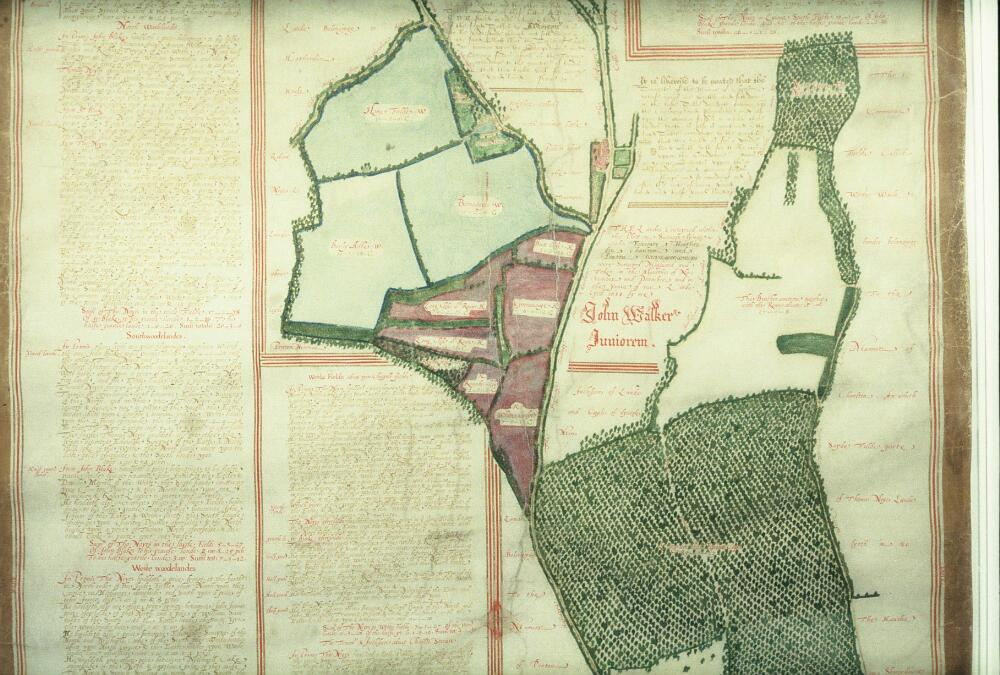
Estate map of Foxcotte Manor, near Andover 1614 onwards showing further list of Charlton copyholders

Strips of land held on copyright tenure in Charlton formed part of the manor of Foxcotte, and are documented its estate maps from 1614 onwards. In 1892 Charlton was a moderately sized rural settlement, with a school, smithy, two farms, a Methodist chapel, and two pubs.

St Thomas' Church was built in 1908. By 1969 the Village had undergone some expansion, and in-fill houses had been added. Andover had expanded past the railway line and the gap between Charlton and it was now almost non-existent.

For Charlton itself, the greatest growth in its history came in the late 1970s and 80s, with very large development primarily to the west of Hatherden Road. The new houses were in a suburban style, extinguishing most of the remaining rural character.

More development took place after 2017, to the east of the historic centre.

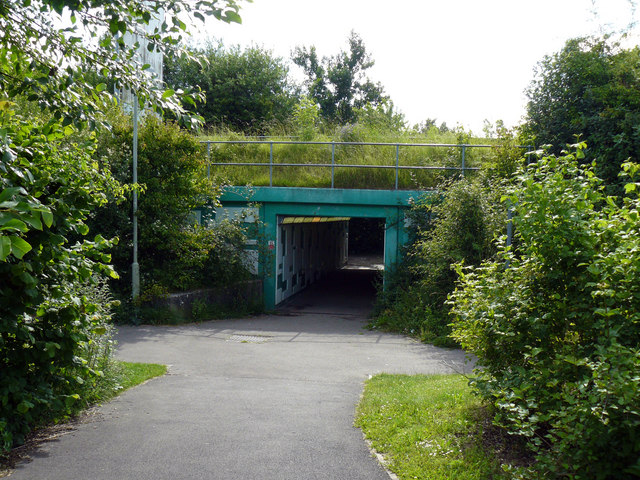
Charlton Underpass (2008)

Today there are some reminders of Charlton's rural past; there are at-least eight thatched buildings (including part of the Royal Oak) and several other historic buildings.

== Charlton Lakeside ==
There are also a number of other sporting venues to suit everyone of all ages provided by Charlton Leisure centre. These include:

- 6 Football pitches (1 floodlit)
- 2 Cricket pitches
- 6 Lane all weather floodlit running track
- 1 Artificial turf pitch (floodlit)
- 18 hole pitch and putt course
- 18 hole adventure golf course
- Children's playground
- Boating lake
- Fishing lake
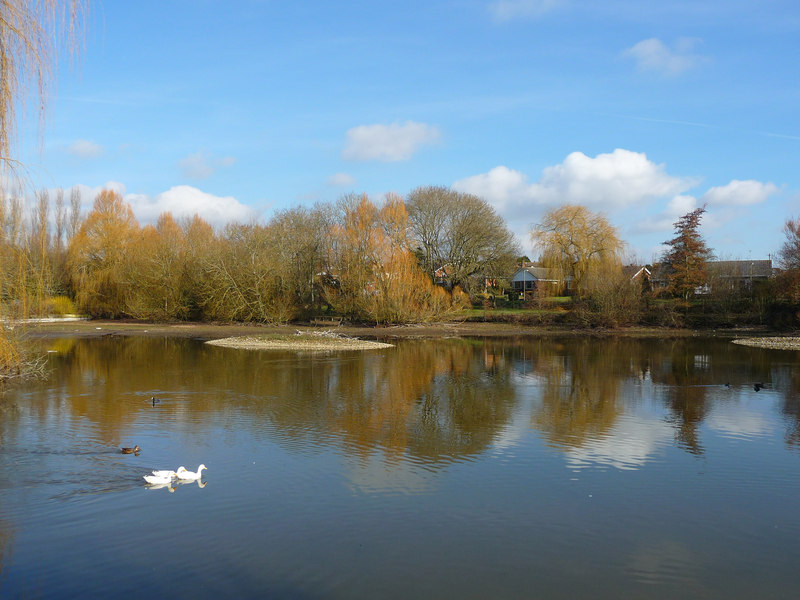
- Charlton, Charlton Lakes (2012)
  BMX Track

== Sporting events ==
- Test Valley Cycle Tour
- The RPM Challenge Bike Ride Of The Day
- Andover RFC
- Andover Parkrun - a weekly, free 5k run around Charlton Playing Fields

== Amenities ==
Along with all the sporting facilities in the village, the local church also provides many services to the community. There are also shops.

Like any traditional English village, the Royal Oak is Charlton's local pub. The pub also has various pool, dart and football teams as well as a very popular weekly quiz night.
