= Foxcotte =

Hamlet in Hampshire, England

Coordinates: 51.223194°N 1.50895°W

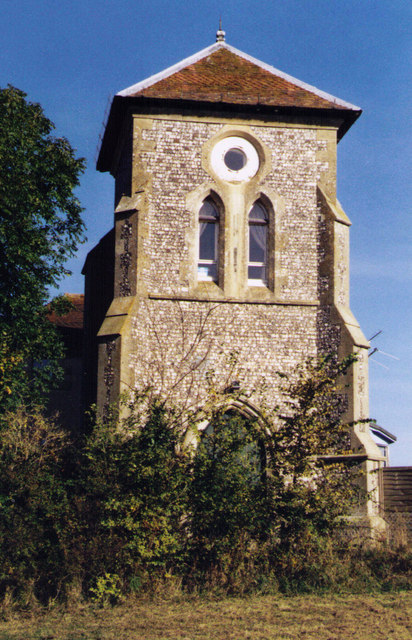
- Foxcott Chapel, now a private house

- Location within Hampshire
- OS grid reference: SU3438947226
- Civil parish: Charlton
- District: Test Valley
- Shire county: Hampshire
- Region: South East
- Country: England
- Sovereign state: United Kingdom
- Post town: ANDOVER
- Postcode district: SP10
- Dialling code: 01264
- Police: Hampshire and Isle of Wight
- Fire: Hampshire and Isle of Wight
- Ambulance: South Central
- UK Parliament: North West Hampshire

Foxcotte is a small hamlet in the civil parish of Charlton in the Test Valley district of Hampshire, England. Its nearest town is Andover, which only lies approximately 1.7 miles (2.7 km) south-east from the hamlet.

== History ==
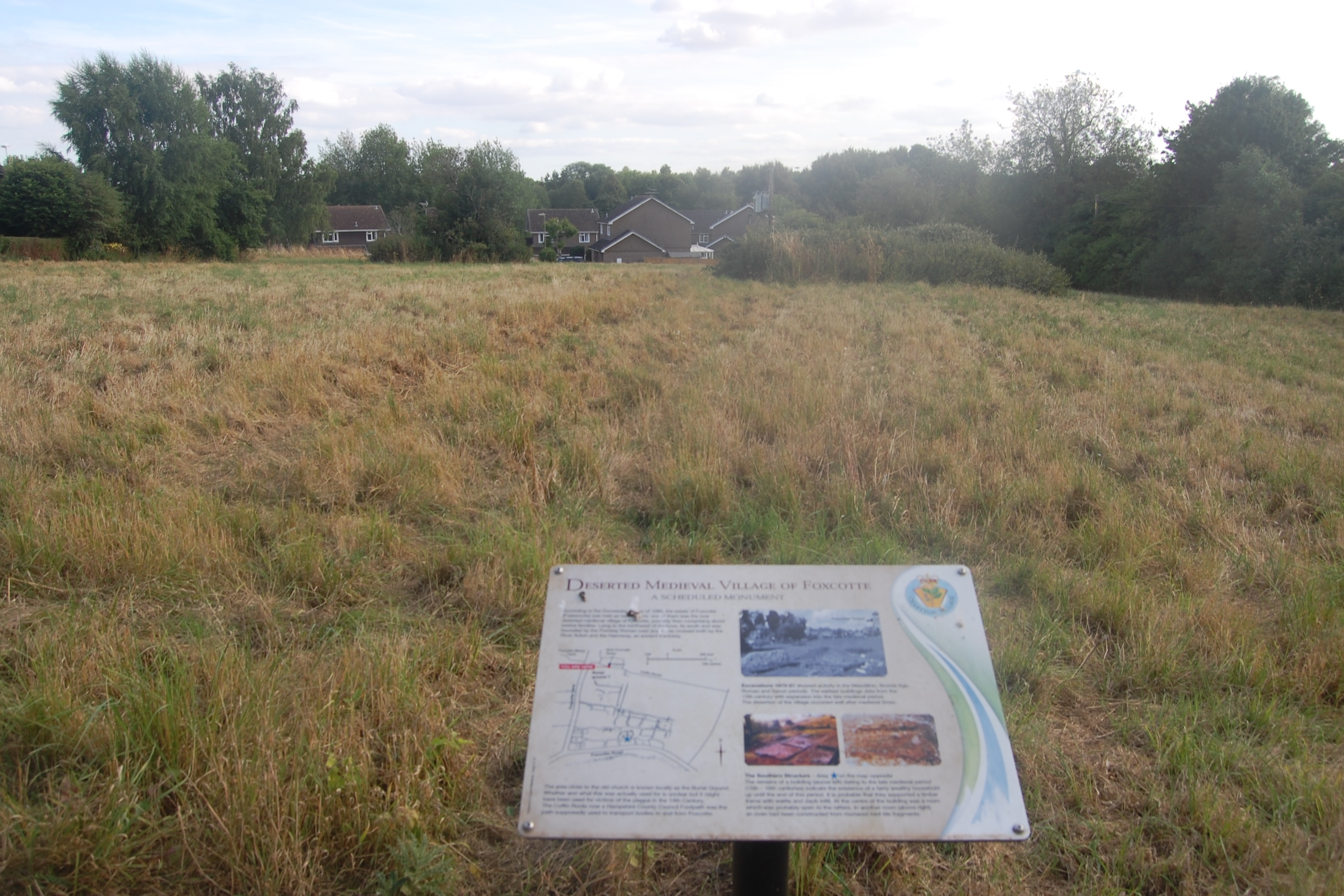
Southward view across site of Deserted Medieval Village of Foxcotte (2022)

Foxcotte was a manor of some notability during and after the reign of William the Conqueror

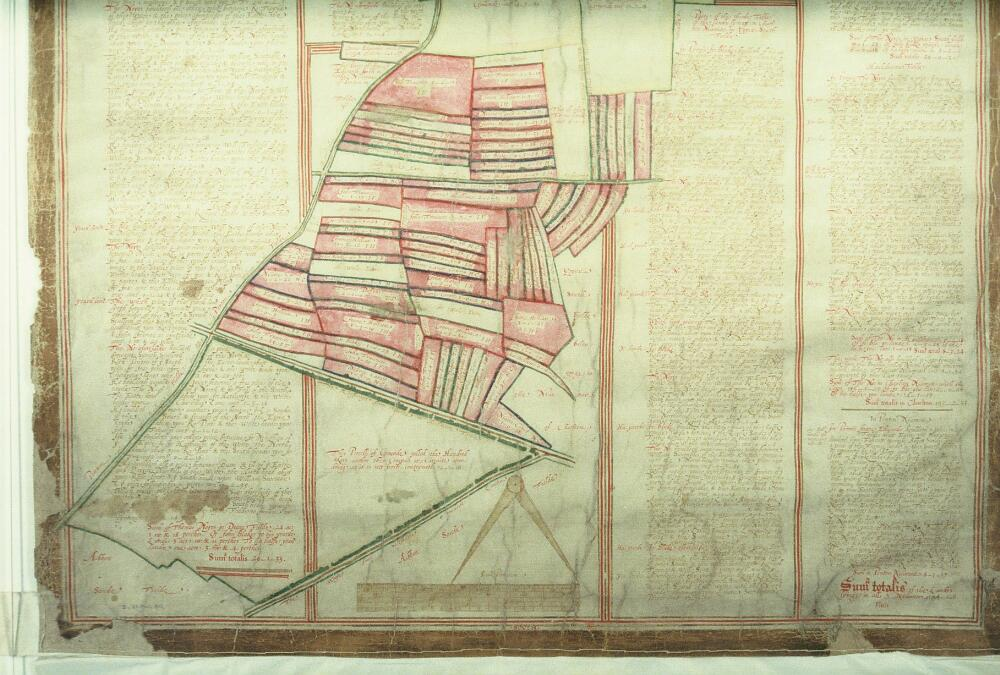
Estate map of Foxcotte Manor near Andover 1614 onwards showing land at Abbott Sande Common

Land surrounding the hamlet is designated a "deserted medieval village" suggesting the hamlet was much larger, although the listing does not include any detail. An Estate map dated from 1614 was produced for Sir Edward Barrett by cartographer John Walker (1577-1618) documenting lands within the manor of Foxcotte. Foxcotte Manor House is shown. Lands to the south at Abbott Sande Common are included. Two further maps in the same production document nearby copyholder land at Charlton. In combination these indicate the size and nature of the manor as at 1614 and offer evidence as to the content of the mediaeval hamlet's holding.

In 1931 the parish had a population of 43. On 1 April 1929 the parish was abolished and merged with Andover.

The history of the church is somewhat obscure, it seems the current structure was built in 1840 on the remains of, or in addition to an earlier medieval structure.

By 1912 the church was sufficiently deteriorated that it was listed as "Remains of"

On an 1805 map the hamlet was listed as "Fofcot" On an 1895 map it is listed as "Foxcott"

The hamlet is today made up of "Foxcotte Farm", the former Church (now a private house), a thatched house to the north, a post Second World-War in-fill house and arguably "Lower Farm" to the south.

Although the hamlet it significantly less rural than it once was, with the expansion of both Andover and Charlton, it is detached from the Andover area and, with the exception of the south-east, is fully surrounded by agricultural land.

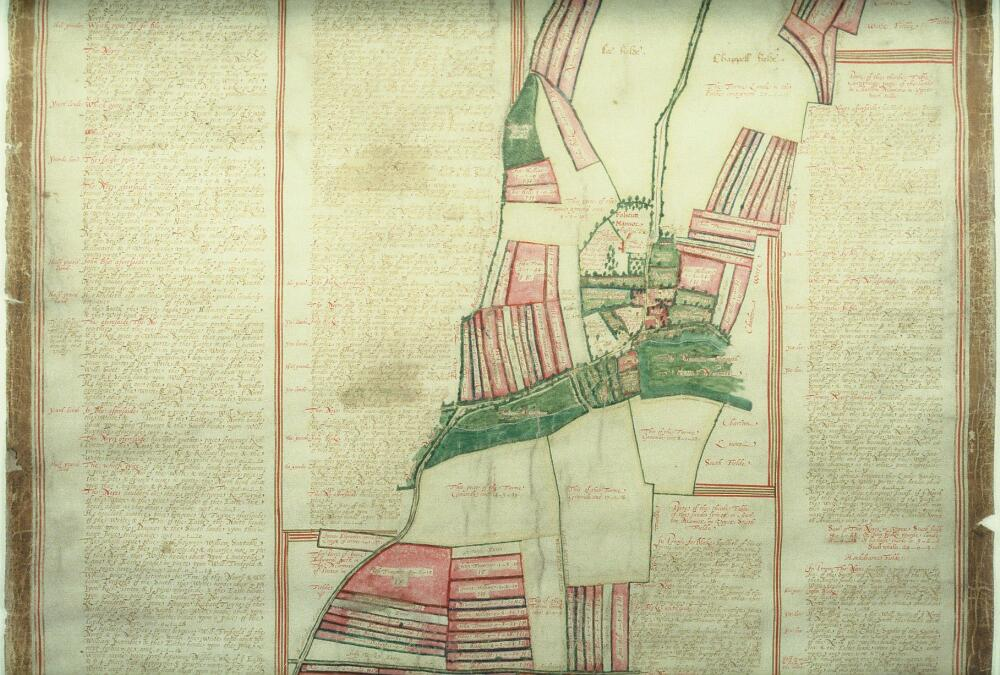
Estate map of Foxcotte Manor, near Andover 1614 onwards, showing Foxcott Manor House.

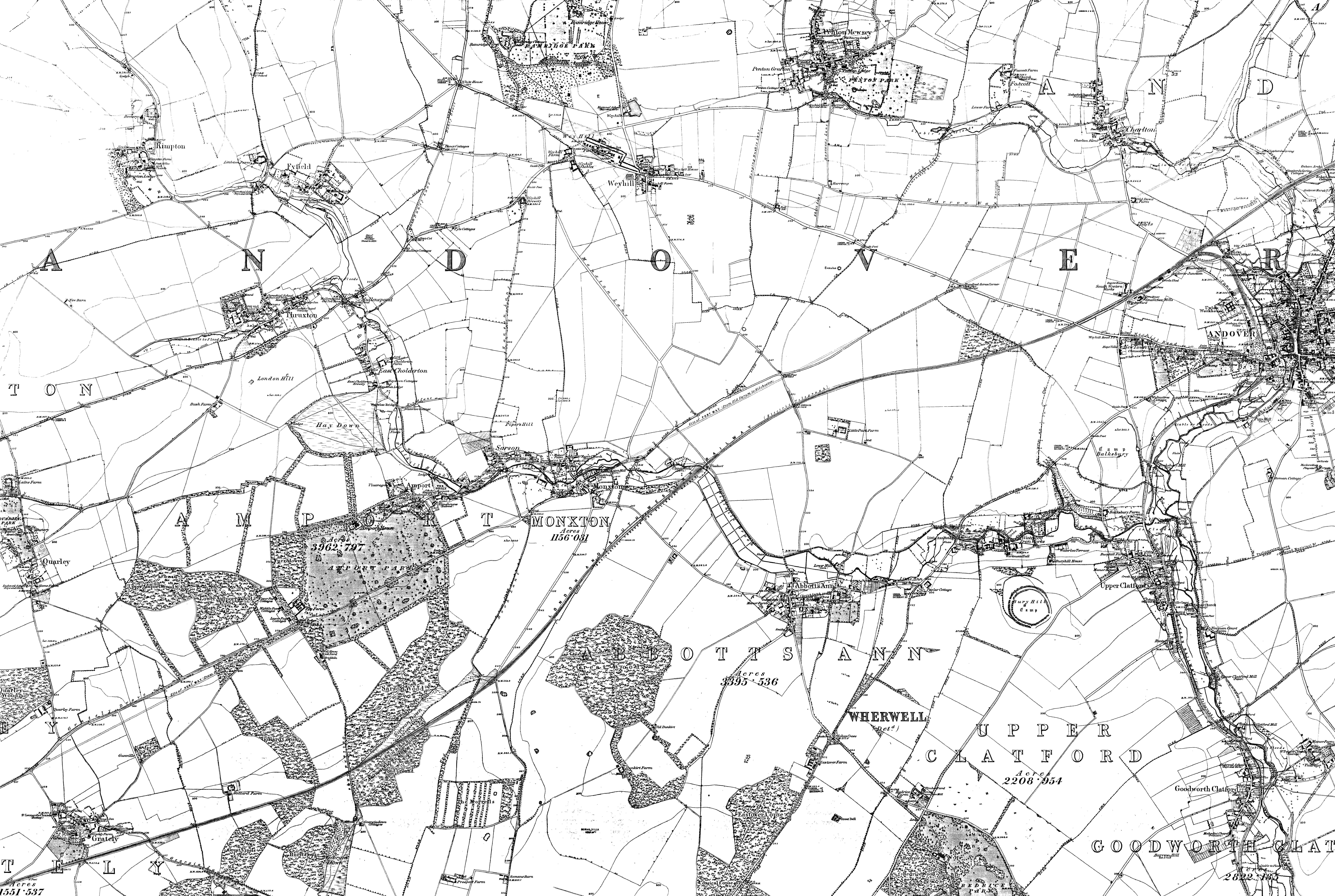
Ordnance Survey map 1866-1889 showing Foxcotte

Both the former chapel and manor farm house are grade two listed
