= Deanery of Alresford =

Anglican administration in Hampshire, England

Coordinates: 51.0901°N 1.1612°W

The Deanery of Alresford lies within the Diocese of Winchester in England.

It includes the parishes of Cliddesden, Dummer, Itchen Abbas, Martyr Worthy, New Alresford and Old Alresford.
