= Province of Canterbury =

Ecclesiastical province of the Church of England

- Church: Church of England
- Metropolitan bishop: Archbishop of Canterbury
- Cathedral: Canterbury Cathedral
- Dioceses: 30

The Province of Canterbury, or less formally the Southern Province, is one of two ecclesiastical provinces which constitute the Church of England (the other is the Province of York). Canterbury province covers 30 dioceses in southern and central England and its metropolitan is the Archbishop of Canterbury.

== Overview ==
The Province consists of 30 dioceses, covering roughly two-thirds of England, parts of Wales, all of the Channel Islands and continental Europe, Morocco, Turkey, Mongolia and the territory of the former Soviet Union (under the jurisdiction of the Diocese of Gibraltar in Europe).

The Province previously also covered all of Wales but lost most of its jurisdiction in 1920, when the then four dioceses of the Church in Wales were disestablished and separated from Canterbury to form a distinct ecclesiastical province of the Anglican Communion. The Province of Canterbury retained jurisdiction over eighteen areas of Wales that were defined as part of "border parishes", parishes whose ecclesiastical boundaries straddled the temporal boundary between England and Wales, that elected to remain part of the Church of England in the 1915–1916 Church of England border polls.

The Province of Canterbury's metropolitan bishop is the Archbishop of Canterbury who also oversees the Falkland Islands, an extraprovincial parish.

== Provincial chapter ==
Bishops of the Southern Province meet in Chapter, in which the episcopal roles (those of Bishops) are analogous to those within a Cathedral Chapter.

In the 19th century, Edward White Benson, Archbishop of Canterbury, discussed with the Bishop of Winchester and others the role of the Bishop of Winchester within the Chapter. Lambeth Palace librarian Samuel Kershaw uncovered documents in which the Bishop of Winchester was Sub-Dean and the Bishop of Lincoln Chancellor, and others in which Winchester was Chancellor and Lincoln Vice-Chancellor. Benson ruled that the Bishop of Winchester would be Chancellor of the province and additionally Sub-Dean only during a vacancy in the see of London (Dean of the province).

Besides the Archbishop of Canterbury (Metropolitan and Primate), the officers of the chapter are:

- Bishop of London – Dean
- Bishop of Winchester – Chancellor (Dean during London sede vacante)
- Bishop of Lincoln – Vice-Chancellor
- Bishop of Salisbury – Precentor
- Bishop of Worcester – Chaplain
- Bishop of Rochester – Crucifer (Cross-Bearer).

Accordingly, at the confirmation ceremony following Justin Welby's election as Archbishop of Canterbury on 4 February 2013, these were, respectively: Richard Chartres, Tim Dakin, Christopher Lowson, Nick Holtam, John Inge, and James Langstaff.

During the vacancy in the See of Canterbury following Justin Welby's resignation, Sarah Mullally (then Bishop of London) — in her capacity as Dean of the province — presided at the confirmation of Sophie Jelley's election to the See of Coventry at Lambeth Palace on 14 February 2025.

At the installation ceremony following Sarah Mullally's confirmation as Archbishop of Canterbury, on 25 March 2026, Philip Mounstephen fulfilled the Dean's role due to the sede vacante in London.

== Bishops qualifying as Lords Spiritual ==
The Bishops of London and Winchester join the Archbishop and two from the northern province of England (York and Durham) in having ex officio (meaning by virtue of the office they hold, hence automatically) the right to sit in the House of Lords subject to keeping to certain constitutional conventions incumbent on Lords Spiritual requiring them to speak in an albeit often political, but clearly non-partisan manner, and not to participate in most party-whipped votes. Twenty-one other Church of England diocesan bishops, drawn from both provinces, form the other Lords Spiritual in the House of Lords.
