= Enham Alamein =

Village and civil parish in Hampshire, England

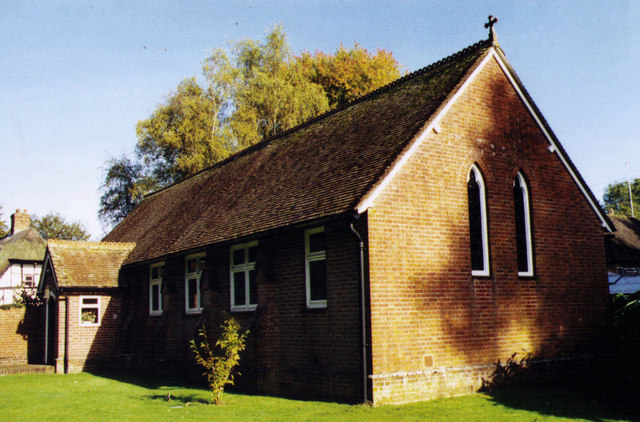
St George's Church, Enham Alamein

Enham Alamein is a village and civil parish about 2 1/2 miles north of Andover in the north of Hampshire, England. It was named Enham until 1945.

There are three population areas, in order from north to south, now named Upper Enham (formerly Upper King's Enham), Enham Alamein (formerly Lower King's Enham and then Enham) and Knight's Enham. At the 2011 Census the population of the civil parish was 804.

Knight's Enham is now part of the north edge of suburban spread of Andover, about a kilometre south along the A343 road from Enham Alamein. The earlier settlement is a hamlet and a church with a first recorded date of 1241.

The village of Enham was one of the original "Village Centres" chosen for the rehabilitation of injured and war-disabled soldiers returning from the front line of World War I. Originally funded by King George V in 1919, the Village Centre became a hub for the care of these soldiers where they were retrained in new trades such as basketry, upholstery, gardening services and other trades. This formed the basis of the Enham Trust charity and limited company, which continues today and owns the majority of Enham Alamein village, providing care for civilians with disabilities.

== Etymology and history ==
=== Enham ===
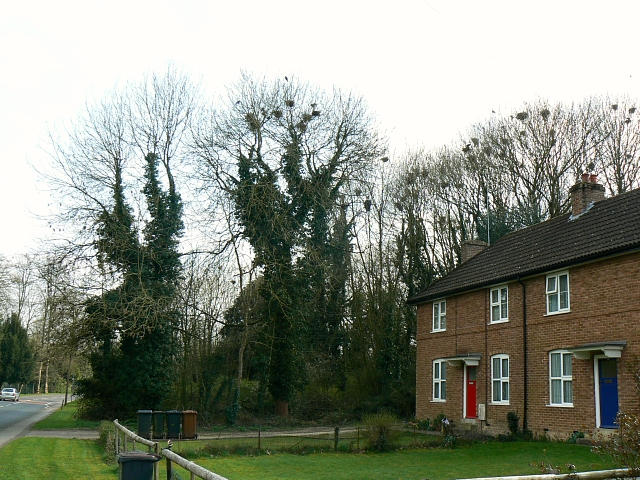
Houses, Enham Alamein

The spelling Anglo-Saxon "Eanham" is recorded from the year 1008, pointing to ēan-hām = "lamb homestead" or ēan-hamm = "enclosure, for the raising of lambs".

There is a speculation that the "raising of lambs" refers to the rebirth of England under the one Christian God, as decreed in the Enham Codes written in the year 1008 at what later became Kings Enham (Upper and Lower), the royal estate of the 1008 lawcode and known as such in the later Middle Ages.

Of particular interest is the meeting of the Witan including Bishop Wulfstan and King Aethelred II at Upper (Kings) Enham on 16 May 1008. ). This law-making council of 40 nobles and around 360 retainers put into draft a decree detailing the social ordering of England and to bring England as a whole under one Christian God, One King, and giving all men the right to law. These laws were aimed at bringing the populace together against the Viking raiders and are referred to as "the Enham Codes" The meeting was held at what later became Kings (Upper) Enham on the high ground along what is now MacCallum Road (previously Enham Lane) at Home Farm (previously Kings Enham Farm).

At Home Farm there are Neolithic, Bronze Age, Iron Age, Roman, Anglo-Saxon and medieval deposits indicating consistent habitation, with at least one Roman villa confirmed as significant by Andover Museum, and a clear boundary ditch locally known as "the valley". Other deep earthworks can be remembered in living memory before they were filled in to make way for modern farm machinery.

Early records are:

- 1008: Eanham, i.e. Anglo-Saxon ēan-hām = "lamb home" or ēan-hamm = "enclosure by a river or marsh, for lambs"
- 1066: Domesday Book "Etham"
- 1167: Enham
- 1281: Separate settlement of "Knyghtesenham", knight's fee held here by Matthew de Columbers in the mid 13th century.
- 1316: "Enham Militis" (= "Enham of the knight": miles is Latin for "soldier", used in Mediaeval Latin for "knight").
- 1379: Enham Regis (= "Enham of the King") and "Enham Militis" (as above)
- 1595: Kings Eneham and Eneham: Knights Enham does not reappear until 1759
- 1720: Enham
- 1759: Knights Inham, Upper Kings Inham, Lower Kings Inham (with given alternative of Lower Kings Enham)
- 1900: (Knight's Enham, Upper Kings Enham and Lower Kings Enham were each a group of a few houses)
- 1919: Knights Enham, Upper Enham, Enham
- 1945 to present: Knights Enham, Upper Enham, Enham Alamein

In 1919, George Hughes Earle of the Cavalry Club in Piccadilly in London inherited a landed estate, and sold 1,026 acres (415 ha) of it to the trustees of the Village Centres for Curative Treatment and Training Council (Incorporated). The centre was set up, using this land, with the support of King George V and his wife Queen Mary, and adapted to house and rehabilitate and employ soldiers returning disabled from World War I with "the effects of amputations, neurasthenia, shellshock or fever". By the end of 1919, 150 men were residing in and about Enham Place and Littlecote House.

In 1921 the trust bought 8 more acres in four parcels at Knight's Enham. The trust received from the Board of Trade a licence to hold not more than 10,000 acres of land to carry out the trust's purpose. During the 1920s and 1930s, much of the land had to be sold to pay expenses; one sale of 1934 was for the 232-acre (94 ha) Home Farm.

Some of the home's patients remained there and set up in jobs such as carters, hauliers, market gardeners and dairy farmers.

=== WW2 and the name Alamein ===
In World War II, many of the injured from the Battle of El Alamein in North Africa were brought back to the recovery centre in Lower Enham. This close association of servicemen and the village continued during and after the war.

In November 1945, two public subscriptions in Egypt raised £250,000 (worth around £8 million in 2015), to thank Britain for ridding their country of the Axis forces. A small part went to build a new UN Forces Sports Club in Gezira in Cairo; but most was given to the Enham charity to care for disabled ex-servicemen. This greatly improved the charity's finances, and let them build their disabled ex-servicemen's centre.

The name Alamein was added to the village’s name in thankfulness for the above, after the Egyptian village of El Alamein, the site of the famous battle of El Alamein. The word El Alamein (العلمين) literally means ‘the two flags’.

== Community ==
The village has a heritage trail and a children's treasure trail.
