= Ewhurst, Hampshire =

Village and parish in Hampshire, England

Coordinates: 51.307°N 1.183°W

Ewhurst
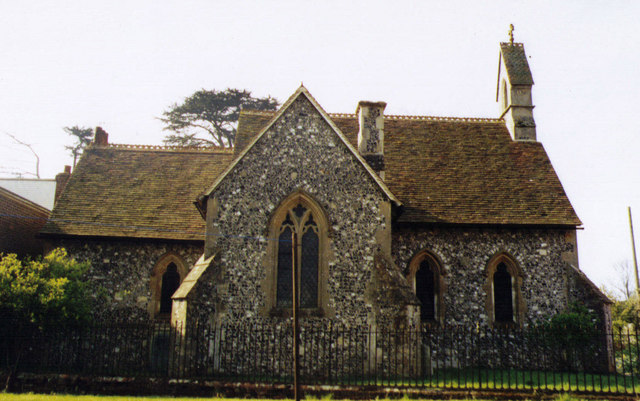
- St Mary's Church

- Location within Hampshire
- Civil parish: Baughurst
- District: Basingstoke and Deane
- Shire county: Hampshire
- Region: South East
- Country: England
- Sovereign state: United Kingdom
- Post town: Tadley
- Postcode district: RG26
- Dialling code: 01256
- Police: Hampshire and Isle of Wight
- Fire: Hampshire and Isle of Wight
- Ambulance: South Central
- UK Parliament: North West Hampshire

Ewhurst is a village in the civil parish of Baughurst, in the Basingstoke and Deane district, in Hampshire, England, and 6.2 miles (10.0 km) northwest of Basingstoke. Its parish church dates from 1682. The village itself is much older, being referenced as "Ywyrstæ stigel" in 1023, appearing in the Domesday Book as "Werste", and later as "Ywhurst" in 1242.

== Governance ==
The village is part of the Baughurst and Tadley North ward of Basingstoke and Deane Borough Council. The borough council is a Non-metropolitan district of Hampshire County Council.

In 1931 the parish had a population of 47. On 1 April 1932 the parish was abolished and merged with Baughurst.
