= Philip Mounstephen =

British Anglican bishop and Lord Spiritual (born 1959)

The Right Reverend Philip Mounstephen
- Bishop of Winchester
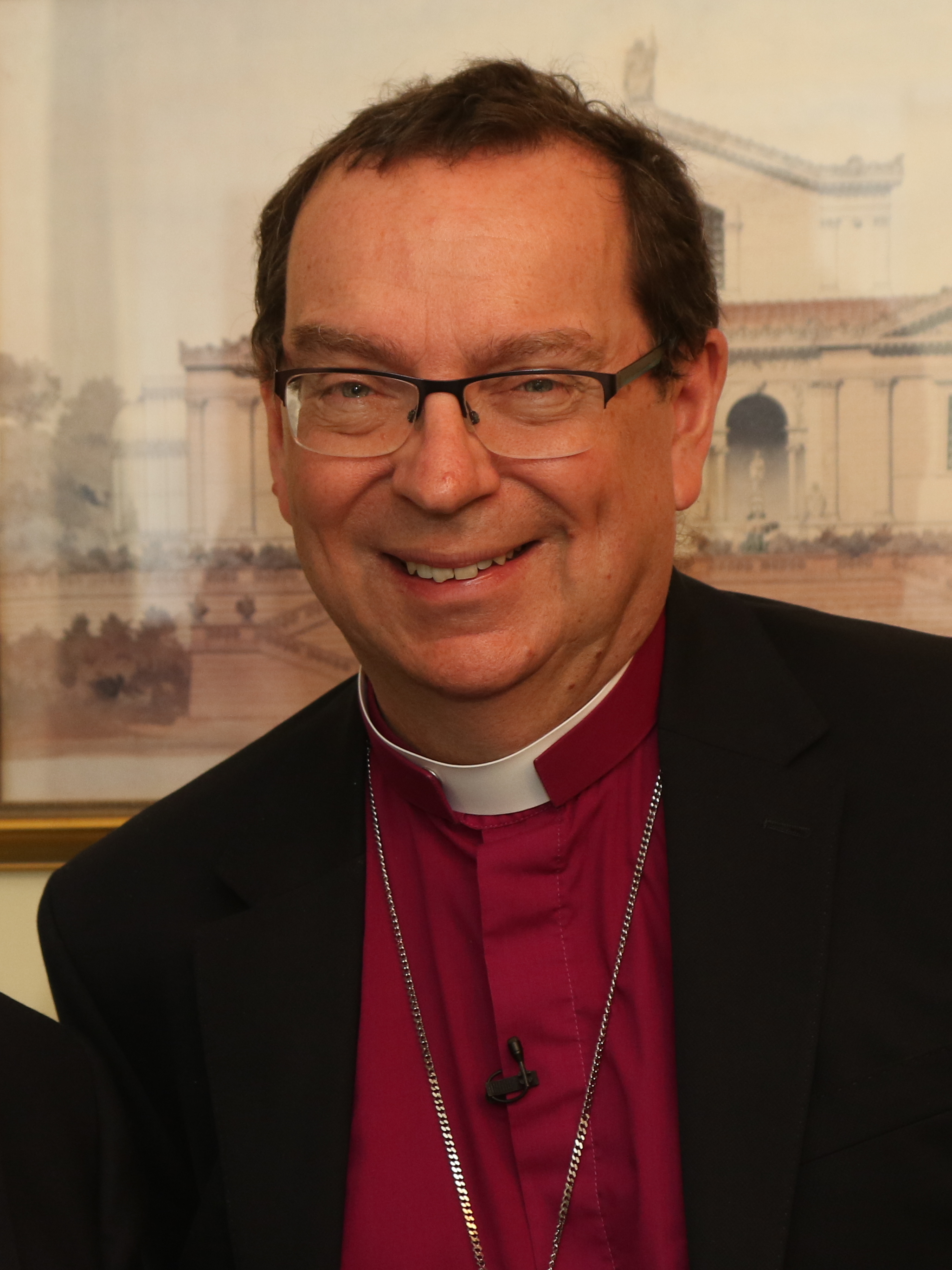
- Mounstephen in 2019
- Church: Church of England
- Diocese: Diocese of Winchester
- In office: 2023–present
- Predecessor: Tim Dakin
- Previous posts: Bishop of Truro (2018–2023); Executive leader, Church Mission Society (October 2012 – November 2018)

Orders
- Ordination: 1988 (deacon); 1989 (priest)
- Consecration: 30 November 2018 by Justin Welby

Personal details
- Born: 13 July 1959 (age 67) Crookham Village, Hampshire
- Denomination: Anglican
- Spouse: Ruth Weston (m. 1984)
- Children: 1
- Education: University of Southampton; Magdalen College, Oxford; Wycliffe Hall, Oxford

Member of the House of Lords
- Lord Spiritual
- Ex officio as Bishop of Winchester; 12 December 2023

Philip Ian Mounstephen (born 13 July 1959) is a British Anglican bishop and missionary. He has been the Bishop of Winchester since 2023, having been Bishop of Truro from November 2018 until 2023. Mounstephen was previously the executive leader of the Church Mission Society (CMS); worked for the Church Pastoral Aid Society (CPAS); and served in parish ministry in the Diocese of Oxford, the Diocese of Southwark and the Diocese in Europe.

== Early life and education ==
Mounstephen was born on 13 July 1959 in Crookham Village, Hampshire, England. He was educated at St Edward's School, Oxford, a private boarding school in Oxford, Oxfordshire. He studied English literature at the University of Southampton, graduating with a Bachelor of Arts (BA) degree in 1980. He then underwent teacher training at Magdalen College, Oxford, completing his Postgraduate Certificate in Education (PGCE) in 1981.

In 1985, Mounstephen entered Wycliffe Hall, Oxford, an Evangelical Anglican theological college, to train for ordained ministry. During this time, he also studied theology at Magdalen College, Oxford, and he graduated with a further BA in 1987: as per tradition, his BA was later promoted to a Master of Arts (MA Oxon) degree. He also completed a Certificate in Theology (CTh) in 1988.

== Ordained ministry ==
Mounstephen was ordained in the Church of England: made a deacon at Petertide 1988 (3 July) at St Mary's Church, Amersham and ordained a priest the following Petertide (2 July 1989) at Christ Church Cathedral, Oxford – both times by Simon Burrows, Bishop of Buckingham. From 1988 to 1992, he served his curacy at St James Church, Gerrards Cross with St James' Church, Fulmer in the Diocese of Oxford. From 1992 to 1998, he was Vicar of St James Church, West Streatham in the Diocese of Southwark.

In 1998, Mounstephen joined the Church Pastoral Aid Society (CPAS) and served in a number of roles. He was head of Pathfinders from 1998 to 2002, director of the CY Network from 2001 to 2002, head of ministry from 2002 to 2007, and deputy general director from 2004 to 2007.

In January 2007, Mounstephen returned to parish ministry as chaplain (the senior minister) of St Michael's Church, Paris. During his time in Paris, he also served as a member of the diocesan synod of the Diocese in Europe. He was a made a minor canon of the Cathedral of the Holy Trinity, Gibraltar, in August 2012, and he was collated as a "canon without stall" during a service at St Matthew's Church, Westminster, in October 2017.

On 1 July 2012, it was announced that Mounstephen would be the next executive leader of the Church Mission Society (CMS) in succession to Tim Dakin. He took up the post on 13 October 2012 during a commissioning service at St Aldate's Church, Oxford.

=== Episcopal ministry ===
On 30 August 2018, it was announced that Mounstephen would be the next Bishop of Truro, the diocesan bishop of the Diocese of Truro. He officially became bishop-elect upon the confirmation – on 20 November at St-Mary-le-Bow – of his election; he was consecrated a bishop on 30 November at St Paul's Cathedral by Justin Welby, Archbishop of Canterbury, and was welcomed at Truro Cathedral on 12 January 2019.

In July 2023, it was announced that Mounstephen would be the next Bishop of Winchester, the diocesan bishop of the Diocese of Winchester, and that he was to leave his post at Truro in autumn 2023. He was formally translated from Truro to Winchester at the confirmation of his election on 10 October at St Mary-le-Bow.

The Bishop of Winchester is one of five Church of England bishops who sit ex officio among the 26 Lords Spiritual in the House of Lords. Mounstephen joined the House of Lords on 15 November 2023. He made his maiden speech on 11 January 2024 during a debate on the impact of climate change on developing nations.

=== Views ===
Mounstephen believes "passionately in the doctrine of marriage as we have received it" (i.e. one man and one woman for life). In February 2023, he voted for the introduction of blessings for those in same-sex relationships.

== Personal life ==
In 1984, Mounstephen married Ruth Weston. They have one daughter.

== Selected works ==
- Mounstephen, Philip; Martin, Kelly (2004). Body beautiful?: recapturing a vision for all-age church. Cambridge: Grove Books. ISBN 978-1851745739.
- Mounstephen, Philip (2015). "Teapots and DNA: The Foundations of CMS". Intermission. 22.
- Berry, Mark; Mounstephen, Philip (2017). The Forgotten Factor: Placing Community at the Heart of Mission. Cambridge: Grove Books. ISBN 978-1788270021.

Non-profit organization positions
Preceded by Tim Dakin as General Secretary	Executive Leader of the Church Mission Society; 2012–2018	Succeeded by Alastair Bateman as Chief Executive Officer
Church of England titles
Preceded by Tim Thornton	Bishop of Truro; 2018–2023	Succeeded by David Williams
Preceded by Tim Dakin	Bishop of Winchester; 2023–present	Incumbent
