= Minley =

Coordinates: 51.315°N 0.831°W

- Location within Hampshire
- Civil parish: Blackwater and Hawley
- District: Hart
- Shire county: Hampshire
- Region: South East
- Country: England
- Sovereign state: United Kingdom
- Post town: Fleet
- Postcode district: GU51
- Police: Hampshire and Isle of Wight
- Fire: Hampshire and Isle of Wight
- Ambulance: South Central
- UK Parliament: Aldershot

Minley is a slightly depopulated rural, well-wooded village in the Hart District of Hampshire, England. It has the only church of the C of E ecclesiastical parish of Minley and is in the civil parish of Blackwater and Hawley. It straddles the A327 road between the M3 and Yateley.

Outlying retail parades of Blackwater and Farnborough are about 1 mile (1.6 km) between all three places, on Minley Road and the east end of Sandy Lane (in Cove and Hawley).

== History ==
Minley is included in the Domesday Book of 1086 as Mindeslei, in the Holesete Hundred, Hantescire (Hampshire) as a manor in Yateley, assessed at 2 hides and at 20 shillings (£1.00), and was still held directly of the monarch by Alsi son of Brictsi.

Spellings of Minley include: Mundeleya, 1189–1199 which resembles continued Welsh orthography with its use of u for i (as next to n of the time it looked identical to m, see Middle English orthography); Mundele, 1236; Mendeley, 1280; Mynley, 1516 and Mindley in the 18th century. Minley ferm (Farm) is shown on a general whole-county map, of a near-national series, by Norden from 1607 as well as Crundall Hundred.

Per the Domesday Book, the manor was land/estate of 2 hides (likely about 240 to 300 acres (1.2 km^{2})); now however, Minley Manor (more formally Minley Manor House) is the mansion house built by Henry Clutton in 1858–60, later for some time with its own demesne grounds used by the Royal School of Military Engineering.

Guillemont Barracks east before Minley Road, on its north side, abutting Hawley and Cove, were built in 1938. After they were decommissioned by the British Army, they were bought by Sun Microsystems in 1997 for £36m. The company built three office buildings on the site, but after two phases were complete and the dot-com bubble burst in 2000, phase 3 ended mid-build. The whole site became known as Sun Park. The steel superstructure of the underway extra buildings stood until March 2015. After the company was bought by Oracle Corporation in 2009 the facilities and staff relocated to Oracle's Headquarters in Thames Valley Park, Reading. Property company Landid bought the former headquarters in January 2011. In 2013, its planning application to demolish the part-built structures and to build 150 homes there was refused; the next year's application to build 48 homes on the southern half succeeded. As to the rest in January 2015 planning permissions were granted for the demolition of the existing part-built structures and erection of 150 homes, construction of internal roads, provision of open space, school parking area, landscaping and associated infrastructure. In 2018 Hart District Council granted planning permission for the demolition of the existing office buildings and comprehensive redevelopment of the site for the construction of 313 homes along with internal roads, open space, landscaping and associated infrastructure (Sun Park Phase II).

Gibraltar Barracks, further north on the Minley Road, were built in the 1970s and are still in use.
