= 2002 Hart District Council election =

2002 UK local government election

- 2 May 2002

All 35 seats to Hart District Council 18 seats needed for a majority
	First party	Second party	Third party
Party	Conservative	Liberal Democrats	Independent
Seats before	17	12	5
Seats after	22	10	3
Popular vote	14,470	29.600	13,228
Percentage	62.9%	28.6%	8.6%
- Results by Ward
Council control before election
Conservative
Council control after election
Conservative

The 2002 Hart Council election took place on 2 May 2002 to elect members of Hart District Council in Hampshire, England. The whole council was up for election with boundary changes since the last election in 2000. The Conservative Party gained overall control of the council from no overall control.

== Campaign ==
The election saw 10 sitting councillors decide not to seek re-election including 3 former chairmen of the council. 6 Conservatives were unopposed in the election in the wards of Crondall, Eversley, Long Sutton and Odiham, while several Independents stood for the council. The independents included Archie Gillespie, a former Liberal Democrat standing as an independent after being deselected, former councillor Stephen Gorys and an "anti roadblock campaigner" Denis Gotel.

During the campaign a Conservative candidate in Hartley Wintney, Andrew Davies, withdrew meaning only one Conservative would be standing in the ward against Independent Susan Band and 2 Liberal Democrats.

== Election results ==
The results saw the Conservatives gain a majority on the council after winning 22 seats on the council. The Liberal Democrats were reduced to only 10 seats concentrated in their strongholds of Yateley and Hawley. Meanwhile, 3 independents were successful in being elected, 2 in Fleet and 1 in Hartley Wintney. Overall turnout in the election was 29.89%.

Hart local election result 2002
Party	Seats	Gains	Losses	Net gain/loss	Seats %	Votes %	Votes	+/−
Conservative	22			+6	62.9	45.6	14,470	-11.1
Liberal Democrats	10			-3	28.6	41.6	13,228	+11.7
Independent	3			-3	8.6	8.8	2,803	+2.3
Labour	0			0	0.0	3.6	1,141	-3.3
Green	0			0	0.0	0.4	118	+0.4

== Ward results ==
=== Blackwater and Hawley ===
Blackwater and Hawley (2)
Party	Candidate	Votes	%	±%
Liberal Democrats	Brian Blewett	565	60.5	
Liberal Democrats	David Neighbour	544		
Conservative	James Pugmore	369	39.5	
Turnout		1,478	25.7	
Liberal Democrats win (new seat)				
Liberal Democrats win (new seat)				

=== Church Crookham East ===
Church Crookham East (2)
Party	Candidate	Votes	%	±%
Conservative	Peter Hutcheson	739	58.1	
Conservative	Deborah Moss	678		
Liberal Democrats	Roger Carter	533	41.9	
Liberal Democrats	Adrian Emmanuel	501		
Turnout		1,712	32.9	
Conservative win (new seat)				
Conservative win (new seat)				

=== Church Crookham West ===
Church Crookham West (2)
Party	Candidate	Votes	%	±%
Conservative	Michael Poulton	746	60.4	
Conservative	Lorraine Fullbrook	722		
Liberal Democrats	Paul Collins	490	39.6	
Liberal Democrats	Rodney Fisher	402		
Turnout		2,360	31.5	
Conservative win (new seat)				
Conservative win (new seat)				

=== Crondall ===
Crondall (2)
Party	Candidate	Votes	%	±%
Conservative	Norman Lambert	unopposed		
Conservative	Brian Leversha	unopposed		
Conservative win (new seat)				
Conservative win (new seat)				

=== Eversley ===
Eversley
Party	Candidate	Votes	%	±%
Conservative	Hugo Eastwood	unopposed		
Conservative win (new seat)				

=== Fleet Central ===
Fleet Central (2)
Party	Candidate	Votes	%	±%
Independent	Denis Gotel	695	38.8	
Conservative	Carol Leversha	635	35.4	
Conservative	John Stocks	600		
Liberal Democrats	Jeffrey Smith	345	19.2	
Green	Lars Mosesson	118	6.6	
Turnout		2,393	31.4	
Independent win (new seat)				
Conservative win (new seat)				

=== Fleet Courtmoor ===
Fleet Courtmoor (2)
Party	Candidate	Votes	%	±%
Independent	Stephen Gorys	789	39.0	
Conservative	Peter Carr	608	30.0	
Conservative	Colin Hazell	521		
Liberal Democrats	Nicola Dommett	413	20.4	
Labour	Sheila Stone	215	10.6	
Turnout		2,546	36.1	
Independent win (new seat)				
Conservative win (new seat)				

=== Fleet North ===
Fleet North (2)
Party	Candidate	Votes	%	±%
Conservative	Stephen Parker	441	61.3	
Conservative	William Barrell	395		
Liberal Democrats	Erica Axam	278	38.7	
Liberal Democrats	Richard Robinson	210		
Turnout		1,324	26.2	
Conservative win (new seat)				
Conservative win (new seat)				

=== Fleet Pondtail ===
Fleet Pondtail (2)
Party	Candidate	Votes	%	±%
Conservative	Sharyn Wheale	697	47.9	
Conservative	Janet Pearson	614		
Liberal Democrats	Susan Fisher	499	34.3	
Labour	Hugh Meredith	258	17.7	
Turnout		2,068	33.6	
Conservative win (new seat)				
Conservative win (new seat)				

=== Fleet West ===
Fleet West (2)
Party	Candidate	Votes	%	±%
Conservative	Richard Hunt	804	71.8	
Conservative	Sean Holden	782		
Liberal Democrats	Geoffrey Donkin	316	28.2	
Turnout		1,902	30.0	
Conservative win (new seat)				
Conservative win (new seat)				

=== Frogmore and Darby Green ===
Frogmore and Darby Green (2)
Party	Candidate	Votes	%	±%
Liberal Democrats	Robert Harward	797	54.1	
Liberal Democrats	Vivien Street	708		
Independent	Archibald Gillespie	346	23.5	
Conservative	James Lawrence	233	15.8	
Labour	John Davies	97	6.6	
Labour	Joyce Still	94		
Turnout		2,275	28.8	
Liberal Democrats win (new seat)				
Liberal Democrats win (new seat)				

=== Hartley Wintney ===
Hartley Wintney (2)
Party	Candidate	Votes	%	±%
Independent	Susan Band	973	45.8	
Conservative	Mark Fullbrook	824	38.8	
Liberal Democrats	Penelope Gale	326	15.4	
Liberal Democrats	Raymond Johnson	266		
Turnout		2,389	33.8	
Independent win (new seat)				
Conservative win (new seat)				

=== Hook ===
Hook (3)
Party	Candidate	Votes	%	±%
Conservative	Jonathan Glen	988	54.0	
Conservative	Michael Haffey	937		
Conservative	Andrew Henderson	913		
Liberal Democrats	Fergus Kirkham	840	46.0	
Liberal Democrats	David Evans	724		
Liberal Democrats	Anthony Over	709		
Turnout		5,111	31.3	
Conservative win (new seat)				
Conservative win (new seat)				
Conservative win (new seat)				

=== Long Sutton ===
Long Sutton (unopposed)
Party	Candidate	Votes	%	±%
Conservative	Sarah Wallis	unopposed		
Conservative win (new seat)				

=== Odiham ===
Odiham (2) (unopposed)
Party	Candidate	Votes	%	±%
Conservative	Robert Benford	unopposed		
Conservative	Roger Jones	unopposed		
Conservative win (new seat)				
Conservative win (new seat)				

=== Yateley East ===
Yateley East (2)
Party	Candidate	Votes	%	±%
Liberal Democrats	Stuart Bailey	734	65.4	
Liberal Democrats	Graham Cockarill	698		
Conservative	Erica Newbury	309	27.5	
Conservative	Joan Fullbrook	291		
Labour	John Davis	80	7.1	
Labour	Kulwant Lit	54		
Turnout		2,166	26.5	
Liberal Democrats win (new seat)				
Liberal Democrats win (new seat)				

=== Yateley North ===
Yateley North (2)
Party	Candidate	Votes	%	±%
Liberal Democrats	John Keane	615	59.4	
Liberal Democrats	David Simpson	504		
Conservative	Edward Dawson	336	32.5	
Labour	Keith Spendlove	84	8.1	
Labour	Kim Spendlove	75		
Turnout		1,614	23.9	
Liberal Democrats win (new seat)				
Liberal Democrats win (new seat)				

=== Yateley West ===
Yateley West (2)
Party	Candidate	Votes	%	±%
Liberal Democrats	Alan Hammersley	624	59.1	
Liberal Democrats	Myra Billings	587		
Conservative	Maxwell Fullbrook	288	27.3	
Labour	Mary Jenkins	143	13.6	
Labour	Sophie Shepherd	41		
Turnout		1,683	23.7	
Liberal Democrats win (new seat)				
Liberal Democrats win (new seat)				

Preceded by 2000 Hart Council election	Hart local elections	Succeeded by 2003 Hart Council election
