= 2003 Hart District Council election =

2003 UK local government election

← 2002	1 May 2003	2004 →

12 of 35 seats to Hart District Council 18 seats needed for a majority
	First party	Second party
Party	Conservative	Liberal Democrats
Seats before	22	10
Seats after	22	10
Popular vote	6,315	5,358
Percentage	51.8%	44.0%
- Results by Ward
Council control before election
Conservative
Council control after election
Conservative

The 2003 Hart Council election took place on 1 May 2003 to elect members of Hart District Council in Hampshire, England. One third of the council was up for election and the Conservative Party stayed in overall control of the council.

After the election, the composition of the council was:

- Conservative 22
- Liberal Democrat 10
- Independent 3

== Background ==
12 seats were to be contested in the 2003 election, but Eversley ward saw Conservative councillor Hugo Eastwood re-elected without opposition. The other 11 seats had the Conservatives defending 6 seats compared to 5 for the Liberal Democrats, with 10 of them having sitting councillors standing for re-election. The only candidates from other parties standing were 4 from the Labour Party and 3 from the Green Party.

== Election result ==
The results saw the Conservatives retain control of the council after no seats changed parties. There were 2 close results with the Conservatives holding Fleet North by 19 votes over the Liberal Democrats, while the Liberal Democrats held Blackwater and Hawley by 16 votes over the Conservatives. This meant the Conservatives retained 22 seats, compared to 10 for the Liberal Democrats and 3 Independents. Overall turnout in the election was 28.52%.

Following the election, councillor Jan Pearson, quit the Conservative group to sit as an Independent saying she was unhappy about how the group made decisions. Meanwhile, Conservative Lorraine Fullbrook became the new leader of the council after only having been first elected to the council in the 2002 election.

Hart local election result 2003
Party	Seats	Gains	Losses	Net gain/loss	Seats %	Votes %	Votes	+/−
Conservative	7	0	0	0	58.3	51.8	6,315	+6.2
Liberal Democrats	5	0	0	0	41.7	44.0	5,358	+2.4
Labour	0	0	0	0	0.0	3.0	364	-0.6
Green	0	0	0	0	0.0	1.2	144	+0.8

== Ward results ==
=== Blackwater and Hawley ===
Blackwater and Hawley
Party	Candidate	Votes	%	±%
Liberal Democrats	David Neighbour	557	50.7	
Conservative	Vivienne Gascoigne	541	49.3	
Majority		16	1.4	
Turnout		1,098	31.9	+6.2
Liberal Democrats hold		Swing		

=== Church Crookham West ===
Church Crookham West
Party	Candidate	Votes	%	±%
Conservative	Lorraine Fullbrook	593	55.5	
Liberal Democrats	Nicola Dommett	424	39.7	
Green	Nigel Moakes	52	4.9	
Majority		169	15.8	
Turnout		1,069	28.3	−3.2
Conservative hold		Swing		

=== Eversley ===
Eversley
Party	Candidate	Votes	%	±%
Conservative	Hugo Eastwood	unopposed		
Conservative hold		Swing		

=== Fleet Courtmoor ===
Fleet Courtmoor
Party	Candidate	Votes	%	±%
Conservative	Wallace Vincent	673	59.5	
Liberal Democrats	Jeffrey Smith	458	40.5	
Majority		215	19.0	
Turnout		1,131	29.9	−6.2
Conservative hold		Swing		

=== Fleet North ===
Fleet North
Party	Candidate	Votes	%	±%
Conservative	William Barrell	355	51.4	
Liberal Democrats	Richard Robinson	336	48.6	
Majority		19	2.8	
Turnout		691	23.6	−2.6
Conservative hold		Swing		

=== Frogmore and Darby Green ===
Frogmore and Darby Green
Party	Candidate	Votes	%	±%
Liberal Democrats	Viv Street	601	62.1	
Conservative	Colin Mortimer	256	26.4	
Labour	John Davies	111	11.5	
Majority		345	35.7	
Turnout		968	23.3	−5.5
Liberal Democrats hold		Swing		

=== Hartley Wintney ===
Hartley Wintney
Party	Candidate	Votes	%	±%
Conservative	Mark Fullbrook	888	75.7	
Liberal Democrats	Helen Whitcroft	285	24.3	
Majority		603	51.4	
Turnout		1,173	30.3	−3.5
Conservative hold		Swing		

=== Hook ===
Hook
Party	Candidate	Votes	%	±%
Conservative	Andrew Henderson	955	64.7	
Liberal Democrats	David Evans	453	30.7	
Green	Lars Mosesson	68	4.6	
Majority		502	34.0	
Turnout		1,476	26.4	−4.9
Conservative hold		Swing		

=== Odiham ===
Odiham
Party	Candidate	Votes	%	±%
Conservative	Roger Jones	984	76.7	
Liberal Democrats	Anthony Over	299	23.3	
Majority		685	53.4	
Turnout		1,283	37.8	
Conservative hold		Swing		

=== Yateley East ===
Yateley East
Party	Candidate	Votes	%	±%
Liberal Democrats	Graham Cockarill	652	56.5	
Conservative	Thomas Schwartz	404	35.0	
Labour	Sophie Shepherd	97	8.4	
Majority		248	21.5	
Turnout		1,153	28.7	+2.2
Liberal Democrats hold		Swing		

=== Yateley North ===
Yateley North
Party	Candidate	Votes	%	±%
Liberal Democrats	David Simpson	775	61.1	
Conservative	James Lawrence	430	33.9	
Labour	Keith Spendlove	63	5.0	
Majority		345	27.2	
Turnout		1,268	33.1	+9.2
Liberal Democrats hold		Swing		

=== Yateley West ===
Yateley West
Party	Candidate	Votes	%	±%
Liberal Democrats	Myra Billings	518	59.5	
Conservative	Edward Bromhead	236	27.1	
Labour	Mary Jenkins	93	10.7	
Green	Margaret Adhemar	24	2.8	
Majority		282	32.4	
Turnout		871	22.2	−1.5
Liberal Democrats hold		Swing		

Preceded by 2002 Hart Council election	Hart local elections	Succeeded by 2004 Hart Council election
