= Frogmore Community College =

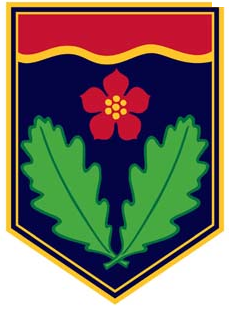

Location
- Potley Hill Road; Yateley, Hampshire, GU46 6AG; England; 51.3344°N 0.8099°W

Information
- Type: Proud to be part of the Weydon Academy Trust
- Motto: Every Student. Every Potential. Every Success.
- Established: 1975
- Local authority: Hampshire
- Department for Education URN: 116442 Tables
- Head teacher: Laura Golbourn
- Gender: Coeducational
- Age: 11 to 16
- Enrolment: 700
- Houses: Cedar, Oak, Rowan, and Willow
- Colours: Light blue, White, Navy
- Website: https://www.frogmorecollege.co.uk/

Frogmore Community College is a state secondary school based in Yateley, Hampshire, England drawing attendees from Yateley, nearby Blackwater, Darby Green, Sandhurst and Eversley.

== History ==
Formerly Frogmore Comprehensive School, then Frogmore Community School, it also used to include a Sixth Form College originally called the Blackwater Valley Centre (BVC) which was fully absorbed when the school took its present name at the end of the 1990s. The school re-branded the sixth form as "FCAS" (Frogmore Centre for Advanced Studies) in 2005, but disbanded after only two years, forcing a partnership with The Sixth Form College, Farnborough. The college still runs adult learning through the University of the Third Age. It at first co-operated with Yateley School but gradually expanded in the 1980s. The school is situated on campus with Potley Hill County Primary School, Potley Hill Pre-School, Frogmore Leisure Centre and Frogmore Day Care Centre.

The Headteacher of Frogmore in the 1990s was Paul Harwood, who left the school to become one of the first 'super-heads' (that would be deployed to take over failing schools nationally). Peter Green became Headteacher in 1999 and left the school in 2008. He was succeeded by Sarah Howells.

In 2014, Sarah Howells temporarily left the school to become headteacher at Cove School, Hampshire as they went into special measures. As Howells left, Chris Vaudin stepped in as the Head of School. In March 2015 it was announced that Howells would become 'executive head' of both Frogmore Community College and Cove School whilst Chris Vaudin remained in charge of the school, an arrangement which was in place until the end of the 2015/16 school year. Howells then left Frogmore in December 2017 to become the Founding Headteacher of King's Academy, Binfield, and was succeeded by former Deputy Head and Head of School, Chris Vaudin.

== Lightning strike of 2014 ==
On 29 April 2014, eyewitnesses in Yateley described the area being lit up in "blinding white" before the "loudest thunder" they had ever heard. Potley Hill Primary School, which is located next to Frogmore Community College on the same campus, and the Frogmore Leisure Centre both closed. A tree and a building roof at Potley Hill were both hit - no students were injured but the debris from the tree smashed through several of the school's windows. The lightning also struck several parts of Frogmore Community College and parts of the school had to be temporarily restricted due to electrical safety issues. There was a power surge in Potley Hill Primary School, Frogmore Leisure Centre and Frogmore Community College, causing fire alarms, security cameras and wireless networks to go down. A spokesman for Hampshire Fire and Rescue Service said: "Crews from Yateley and Hartley Wintney went to the leisure centre at approximately 12:56pm... There was no fire but a power surge had caused the automatic fire alarm to activate... They stayed on the scene until 2:52pm to make sure everything was OK.".
