= Frogmore, Hampshire =

Village in Hampshire, England

Coordinates: 51.335°N 0.794°W

Frogmore
- Location within Hampshire
- OS grid reference: SU841602
- District: Hart
- Shire county: Hampshire
- Region: South East
- Country: England
- Sovereign state: United Kingdom
- Post town: CAMBERLEY
- Postcode district: GU17
- Dialling code: 01252
- Police: Hampshire and Isle of Wight
- Fire: Hampshire and Isle of Wight
- Ambulance: South Central
- UK Parliament: Aldershot

Frogmore is a small suburban village in the northeast of the civil parish of Yateley in the county of Hampshire, England.

The origin of the place-name is from the Old English words frogga and mere, meaning "pool frequented by frogs".

It adjoins Darby Green and lies between the towns of Yateley and Blackwater, and lies 32 miles (51 km) west-south-west of London. The county borders of both Berkshire (Bracknell Forest) and Surrey (Surrey Heath) are approximately one mile away.

The village, part of the Frogmore & Darby Green ward, is under the administrative jurisdiction of Yateley Town Council whilst neighbouring areas fall within the auspices of Blackwater and Hawley Town Council. Frogmore is often considered as a suburban village of both towns by local residents, though it is contiguous with Blackwater.

Frogmore, Darby Green and Blackwater form a mixed community of both affluent and low-income residents; it has a small ex-Romany population.

== Amenities ==
Frogmore has a large, purpose-built village hall (built in 2001, replacing an earlier one), a large village green, a modern medical surgery, a primary school, a public house ('The Bell Inn') which is currently awaiting redevelopment, a modern church and a small shopping parade. An older church stood in nearby Darby Green but burned down in the 1980s.

Frogmore's Post Office was permanently closed in 2004.

Frogmore Community College is on the south-eastern edge of Yateley and includes a sports and leisure complex.

Yateley Common Country Park borders the district and, together with the military land around Gibraltar Barracks at Minley, offers access to many tracks and bridleways across extensive heathland and woodland.
