= Blackwater and Hawley =

Civil parish in Hampshire, England

Coordinates: 51.313°N 0.810°W

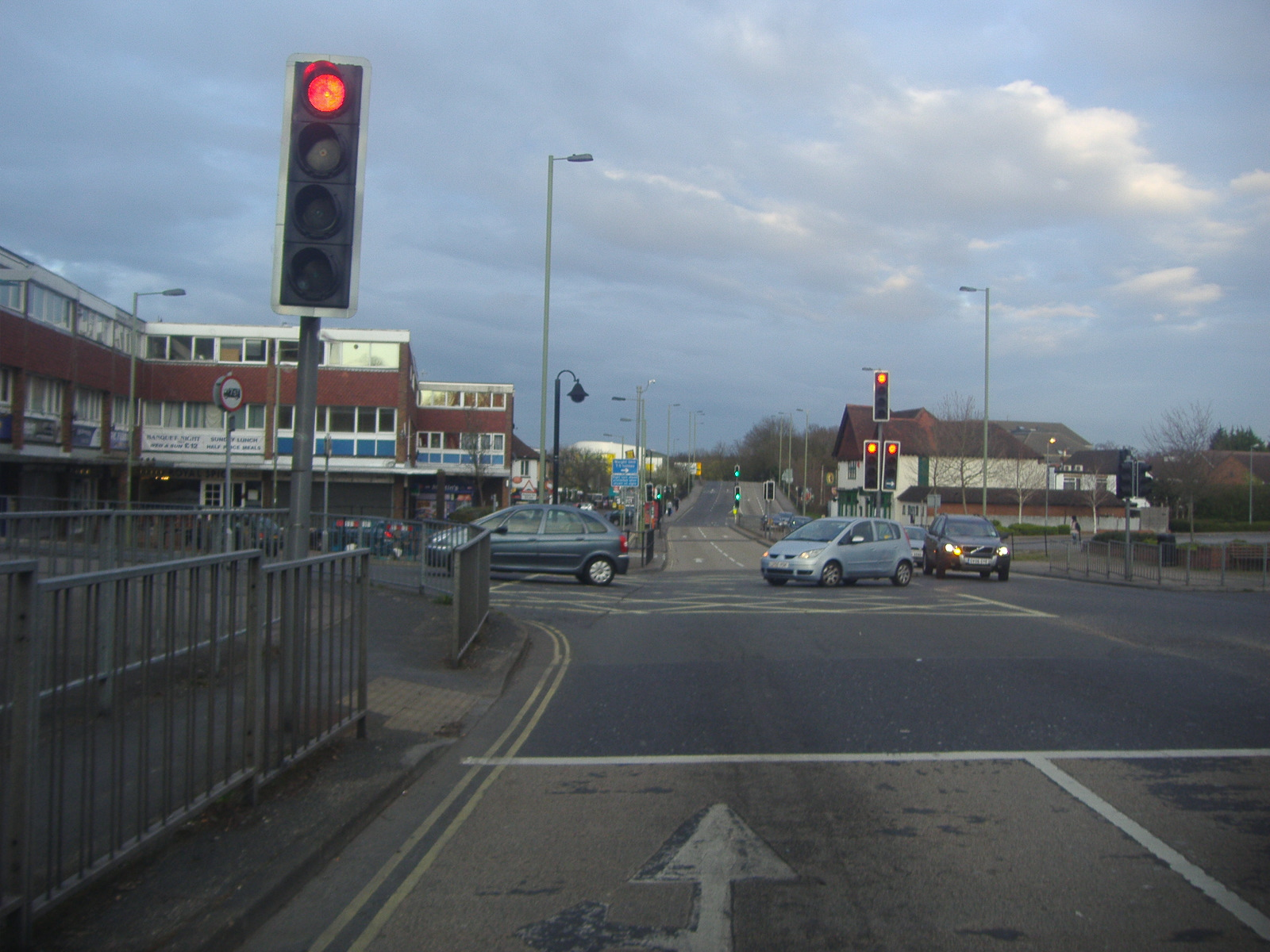
- London Road, Blackwater

- Location within Hampshire
- Population: 4,473 (2011 census)
- Civil parish: Blackwater and Hawley
- District: Hart
- Shire county: Hampshire
- Region: South East
- Country: England
- Sovereign state: United Kingdom
- Police: Hampshire and Isle of Wight
- Fire: Hampshire and Isle of Wight
- Ambulance: South Central

Blackwater and Hawley is a civil parish in the Hart district of Hampshire, England, on the border with Surrey. According to the 2001 census it had a population of 5,849, reducing to 4,473 at the 2011 Census. The parish includes Minley, Blackwater and Hawley, which are both part of the Aldershot Urban Area. It was once part of the parish of Yateley.
