= Well, Hampshire =

Village and parish in Hampshire, England

Coordinates: 51.213505°N 0.911812°W

Well
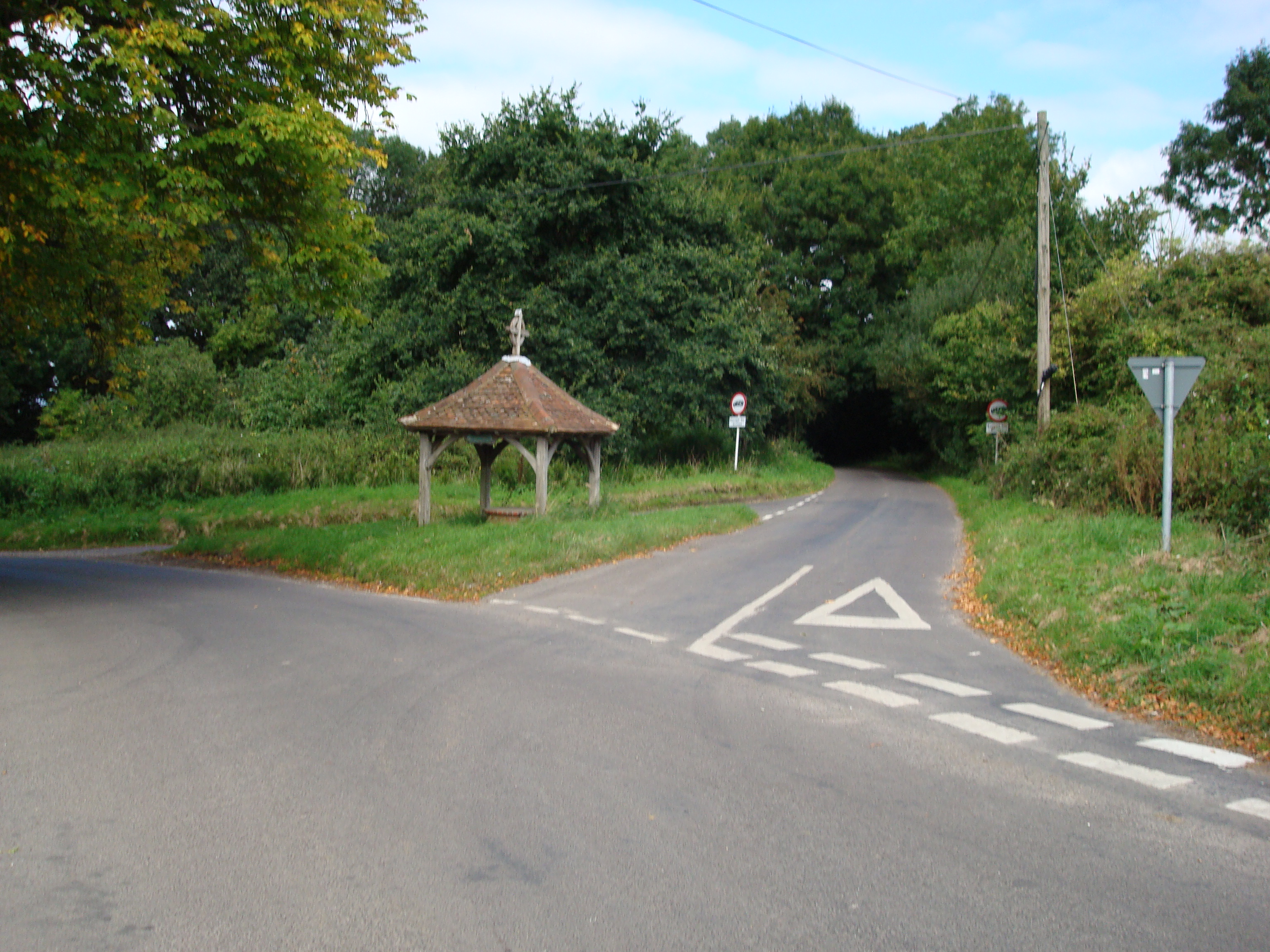
- The waterwell in the village is now filled in

- Location within Hampshire
- OS grid reference: SU7610546596
- District: Hart
- Shire county: Hampshire
- Region: South East
- Country: England
- Sovereign state: United Kingdom
- Post town: Hook
- Postcode district: RG29
- Police: Hampshire and Isle of Wight
- Fire: Hampshire and Isle of Wight
- Ambulance: South Central
- UK Parliament: North East Hampshire

Well is a small village in the Hart district of Hampshire, England. It is in the civil parish of Long Sutton. The village lies approximately 3.1 miles (5.0 km) south-east from Odiham. It is adjacent to Lord Wandsworth College. The local pub is called The Chequers Inn.
