= 2000 Hart District Council election =

2000 UK local government election

The 2000 Hart Council election took place on 4 May 2000 to elect members of Hart District Council in Hampshire, England. One third of the council was up for election and the council stayed under no overall control.

After the election, the composition of the council was:

- Conservative 17
- Liberal Democrat 12
- Independent 5
- Others 1

== Election result ==
Hart local election result 2000
Party	Seats	Gains	Losses	Net gain/loss	Seats %	Votes %	Votes	+/−
Conservative	8			+1	66.7	56.7	7,697	+9.7%
Liberal Democrats	3			+1	25.0	29.9	4,060	-7.1%
Independent	1			0	8.3	6.5	884	+0.2%
Labour	0	0	0	0	0	6.9	934	-2.9%
Others	0			-2	0	0	0	-

== Ward results ==
Blackwater and Hawley
Party	Candidate	Votes	%	±%
Liberal Democrats	David Neighbour	591	56.4	+2.5
Conservative	Edward Dawson	457	43.6	−2.5
Majority		134	12.8	+5.1
Turnout		1,048		

Church Crookham
Party	Candidate	Votes	%	±%
Conservative	Peter Hutcheson	914	61.6	+14.4
Liberal Democrats	Penelope Wright	434	29.3	−15.2
Labour	Hugh Meredith	135	9.1	+0.9
Majority		480	32.4	+29.7
Turnout		1,483		

Crondall
Party	Candidate	Votes	%	±%
Conservative	Brian Leversha	924	74.3	+2.8
Liberal Democrats	Jeffrey Smith	320	25.7	+7.4
Majority		604	48.6	−4.5
Turnout		1,244		

Eversley
Party	Candidate	Votes	%	±%
Conservative	Hugo Eastwood	429	87.6	
Liberal Democrats	Helen Whitcroft-Stokes	61	12.4	
Majority		368	75.2	
Turnout		490		

Fleet Courtmoor
Party	Candidate	Votes	%	±%
Conservative	Peter Carr	1,049	67.7	+1.5
Liberal Democrats	Susan Fisher	376	24.3	+1.6
Labour	Sheila Stone	125	8.1	−3.0
Majority		673	43.4	−0.2
Turnout		1,550		

Fleet Pondtail
Party	Candidate	Votes	%	±%
Conservative	Richard Hunt	936	58.6	−5.5
Independent	Keki Jessavala	512	32.1	+32.1
Labour	Peter Cotton	149	9.3	−5.0
Majority		424	26.5	−16.0
Turnout		1,597		

Fleet West
Party	Candidate	Votes	%	±%
Conservative	Stephen Parker	1,045	67.9	+67.9
Liberal Democrats	Richard Robinson	354	23.0	−3.0
Labour	Janet Carrier	140	9.1	−2.5
Majority		691	44.9	
Turnout		1,539		

Frogmore and Darby Green
Party	Candidate	Votes	%	±%
Liberal Democrats	Archibald Gillespie	573	62.4	+0.4
Conservative	Robin Moore	260	28.3	+3.1
Labour	John Davies	85	9.3	−3.5
Majority		313	34.1	−2.7
Turnout		918		

Hook
Party	Candidate	Votes	%	±%
Conservative	Andrew Henderson	736	53.0	+3.7
Liberal Democrats	Anthony Over	565	40.7	+1.1
Labour	Alan Partridge	88	6.3	−4.8
Majority		171	12.3	+2.6
Turnout		1,389		

Odiham
Party	Candidate	Votes	%	±%
Conservative	Roger Jones	730	77.9	+8.1
Liberal Democrats	David Evans	108	11.5	−4.8
Labour	David Carrier	99	10.6	−3.3
Majority		622	66.4	+12.9
Turnout		937		

Yateley East
Party	Candidate	Votes	%	±%
Independent	Peter Kern	372	50.2	+50.2
Liberal Democrats	Peter Armstrong	296	39.9	−28.2
Labour	Joyce Still	73	9.9	+9.9
Majority		76	10.3	
Turnout		741		

Yateley North
Party	Candidate	Votes	%	±%
Liberal Democrats	Charles Lynch	382	59.8	−5.3
Conservative	Edward Bromhead	217	34.0	+9.7
Labour	Keith Spendlove	40	6.3	−4.3
Majority		165	25.8	−15.1
Turnout		639		

Preceded by 1999 Hart Council election	Hart local elections	Succeeded by 2002 Hart Council election
