= Guillemont =

- Commune
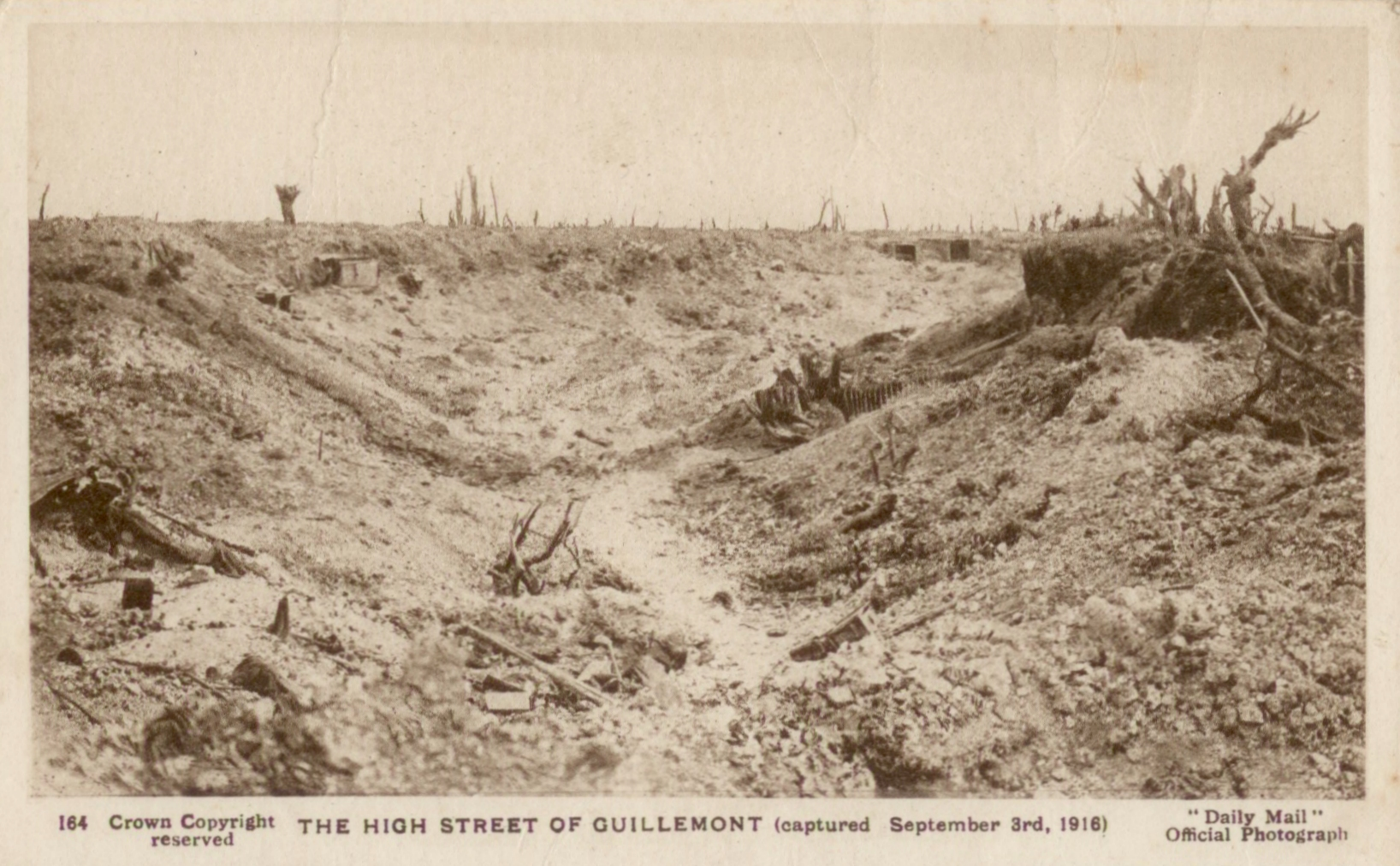
- The high street of Guillemont, in 1916
- Location of Guillemont
- Location within France Location within Hauts-de-France
- Coordinates: 50°00′52″N 2°49′33″E
- Country: France
- Region: Hauts-de-France
- Department: Somme
- Arrondissement: Péronne
- Canton: Péronne
- Intercommunality: Haute Somme

Government
  - Mayor (2020–2026): Didier Samain
- Area^{1}: 3.27 km^{2} (1.26 sq mi)
- Elevation: 138 m (453 ft)
- Highest elevation: 156 m (512 ft)
- Lowest elevation: 94 m (308 ft)
- Population (2023): 126
  - Density: 38.5/km^{2} (99.8/sq mi)
- Time zone: UTC+01:00 (CET)
  - Summer (DST): UTC+02:00 (CEST)
- INSEE/Postal code: 80401 /80360
- ^{1} French Land Register data, which excludes lakes, ponds, glaciers > 1 km^{2} (0.386 sq mi or 247 acres) and river estuaries.

Guillemont (French pronunciation: [ɡijmɔ̃]) is a rural commune approximately 13 km (8 mi) east of Albert in the Somme department in Hauts-de-France in northern France.

It is known for its large Commonwealth War Graves cemetery, which has many visitors. The cemetery began as a field graveyard after the Battle of Guillemont, but was quickly expanded after the Armistice when graves from surrounding areas were centralized here.

In World War I, Guillemont was one of several important strategic areas controlled by Germans that effectively divided Allied forces. It changed hands several times during the war, before being finally taken and held by the British 20th (Light) Division and the 47th Brigade of the 16th (Irish) Division

== Notable burials ==
- Raymond Asquith (1916)
- Edward Tennant (1916)

== See also ==
- Communes of the Somme department
- Guillemont Barracks
