= Cove Brook =

River in Hampshire, England

Coordinates: 51.290°N 0.781°W

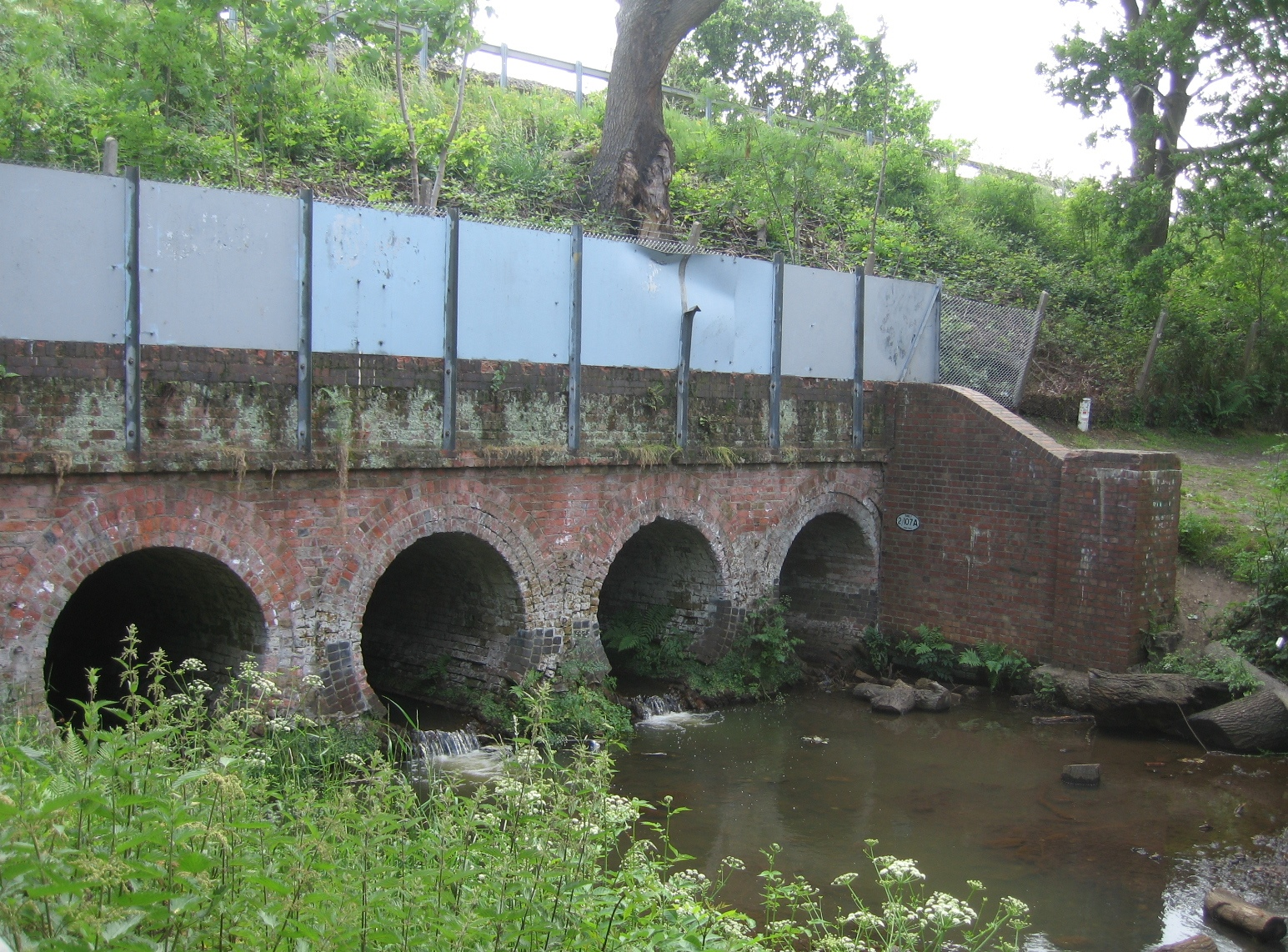
Cove Brook passing under the South West Main Line railway

Cove Brook runs 4 miles (6.4 km) from near Farnborough Airport in Farnborough, Hampshire, England and flows through the former Southwood Golf Course where it is joined by Marrow Brook and other smaller streams. It runs north through Cove before joining the Blackwater at Hawley Meadows near the M3 motorway.

== Route ==
The brook, so-named, begins on Southwood golf course, between the western edge of Farnborough and the eastern edge of Southwood. Here four streams meet, the first of which is Marrow Brook, which flows westwards from Farnborough Business Park. It is joined by a stream which rises near Hungry Hill on the south side of Aldershot, passes under the Basingstoke Canal in a culvert and across the Army Golf Club on Watts Common before flowing through a culvert which takes it under the runways of Farnborough Airport and the A327 road. The third is one which rises in the network of channels on Eelmoor Marsh, before passing under an engineering workshop on the edge of the airport and the A327 road. It is joined by the Pyestock, which rises in another series of channels on Southwood Woodland.

The section that now flows under the airport runways was also called Cove Stream in the 1930s, and carried the overflow from Cove Reservoir, which had a boat house and a bathing shelter. To the south of the Basingstoke Canal, it is known as Claycart Stream, and ran through a valley called Claycart Bottom. As the airport expanded, the reservoir was removed, and more and more of the channel was culverted. Similarly, the Marrow Brook was still on the surface in 1964, running all the way from Kingsmead, to the east of the library. As housing estates were erected in the locality, the meadows of Southwood Farm became a designated flood storage area, with a bund to retain the water under flood conditions, and a new straight concrete channel was constructed, with little thought to environmental impact. To the north of the railway bridge carrying the South West Main Line the channel was enlarged to make it wider and deeper, reducing the risk of flooding. The volume of water in the brook at the time was increased, because it was swelled by the treated outflow from Cove sewage treatment works.

The brook is joined by Hawley Lake Stream that drains Hawley Lake east. This is a large, irregular shaped lake covering 34.79 acres (14.08 ha), the level kept up by a weir. Hawley Lake Sail Training Centre is based on the lake, and is an Army Sailing Association club, open to military personnel and civilians. Their courses are accredited by the Royal Yachting Association. The stream passes under two roads and the M3 motorway.

In 1996 the Cove Brook environmental initiative began, and as part of that the Environment Agency dug out the concrete sections, and recreated a more naturalised channel. The river passes under the railway through five circular culverts, and to the north of this feature, the banks of the river were re-profiled, so that at low flows the water still scoured the bed, making dredging unnecessary. The previous regime of mowing the banks very regularly was abandoned, and vegetation allowed to grow, to enhance the habitat. With assistance from volunteers who were part of the Cove Brook Greenway Group, paths were created, which now run for most of the length of the river.

== Cove Brook Greenway ==
Cove Brook Greenway is a leisure facility that runs along the brook; it was provided in the 1990s by Rushmoor Borough Council as an environmental initiative in partnership with the Environment Agency, and Hampshire and Isle of Wight Wildlife Trust. In the mid-1990s, much of the upstream section of the brook was little more than a concrete channel. The Environment Agency carried out a programme of works to re-create a more natural waterway, and although it runs through an urban area, it now provides a 2-mile (3.2 km) green pathway through Farnborough which is rich in wildlife. The work included the construction of paths, a footbridge across the brook, and dipping areas with safe access. In 1996, residents formed the Cove Brook Greenway Group, a volunteer organisation which undertook further work, clearing rubbish, planting hedges and creating a nature reserve. They have also erected bat boxes and carried out surveys to monitor progress. The river is host to several species of fish. Birds that have been observed include heron, kingfishers, and egrets. Signal crayfish, an invasive species, are also to be found.

== Water Quality ==
The Environment Agency measure water quality of the river systems in England. Each is given an overall ecological status, which may be one of five levels: high, good, moderate, poor and bad. There are several components that are used to determine this, including biological status, which looks at the quantity and varieties of invertebrates, angiosperms and fish. Chemical status, which compares the concentrations of various chemicals against known safe concentrations, is rated good or fail.

The water quality of the Cove Brook was as follows in 2019.

Section	Ecological Status	Chemical Status	Overall Status	Length	Catchment
Cove Brook	Poor	Fail	Poor	4.4 miles (7.1 km)	8.80 square miles (22.8 km^{2})

Reasons for the quality being less than good include the presence of flood protection structures, which prevent the free movement of fish and other organisms, and runoff of water from roads and contaminated land.
