= Darby Green =

Village in Hampshire, England

Coordinates: 51.3316°N 0.8044°W

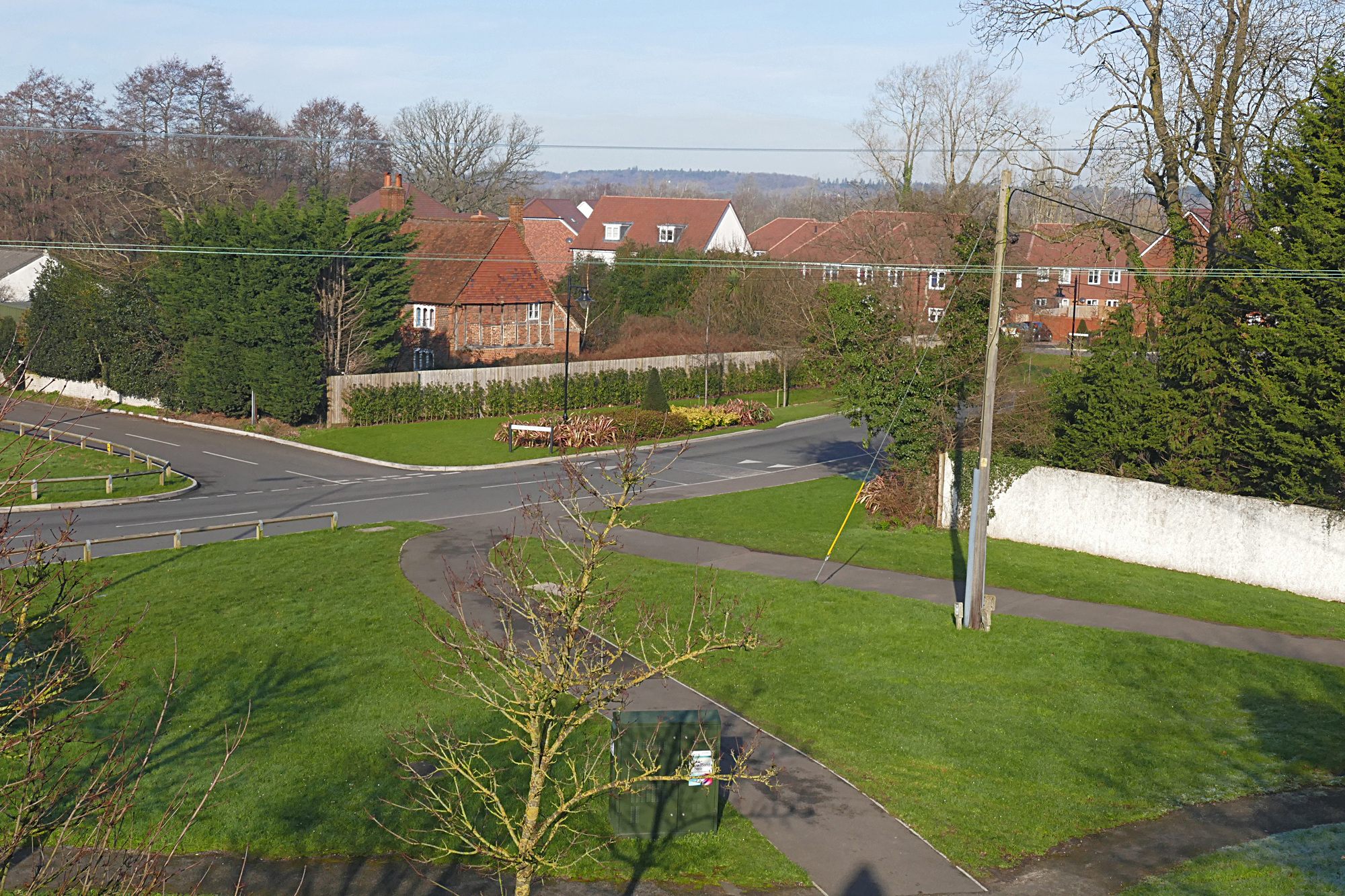
Adam Brown Avenue

Darby Green is a village in the parish of Yateley, North East Hampshire, England. The electoral ward of Frogmore and Darby Green is separated from the rest of the parish by a small gap around Clarks Farm, until recently a composting farm in the mushroom producing industry. The ward has a boundary shared with Blackwater, which is one part of the Civil Parish of Hawley.

Parson Darby was a local vicar and a highwayman; he was supposedly hung at the junction of the B3272 and Darby Green Road. The historian Sidney Loader was a resident of Yateley and lived near this spot.

There used to be a tin church at the corner of the B3272 named for St Barnabas. This burned down in the 1980s and was replaced by a new St Barnabas in Bell Lane, close to Frogmore Green. The previous incumbent was the Reverend Mike Saunders, who was also Rector of Eversley. Every year, close to St Barnabas Day in June, the Church organises a community fair.
