= Wish Stream =

River in Berkshire and Surrey, England

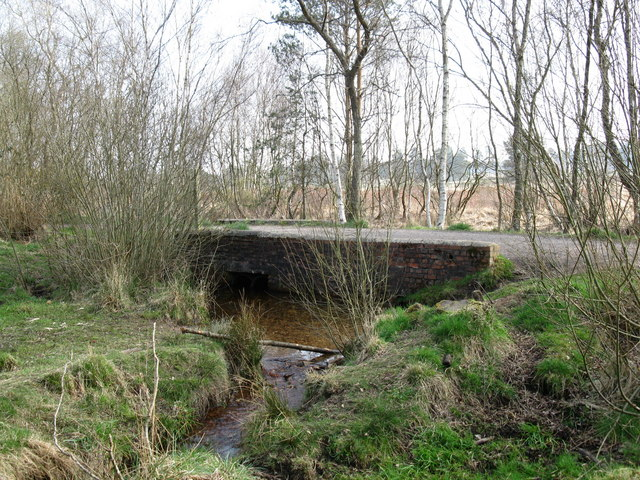
- The Wish Stream and King's Ride bridge at Wishmoor Bottom

Location
- Country: England
- Counties: Berkshire, Surrey
- Towns: Camberley

Physical characteristics
- Source
  - location: Wishmoor Cross
  - coordinates: 51°21′54″N 0°44′08″W
- Mouth: River Blackwater
  - location: Camberley
  - coordinates: 51°19′56″N 0°46′33″W

Wish Stream is a small, steep English river, which is a tributary of the River Blackwater. The border between the counties of Berkshire and Surrey follows the course in the Camberley area. The stream rises on heath land to the north of Camberley and descends in a south-westerly direction, passing through the grounds of the Royal Military Academy Sandhurst. Two large lakes have been made before it leaves the grounds, to pass through a culvert under a retail park and bridges under major roads to discharge into the Blackwater.

== Route ==
The Wish Stream runs through an area where the geology consists of a layer of London Clay, on top of which is a layer of Bagshot sand, often covered by gravel. In places, the underlying clay is quite close to the surface, resulting in rainfall running over the surface, as it is unable to drain away. Although the theory that Wishmoor Cross, where the stream rises, was once a wishing well, and that this was the derivation of the name, it is much more likely that it derives from the Celtic word for "water". The stream formed the boundary between Berkshire to the north-west and Surrey to the south-east for the whole of its length until the 1960s.

The Wish Stream rises from a spring on heath land to the north of Camberley, at Wishmoor Cross, a little above the 330-foot (100 m) contour. The surrounding land is used for military training, and access is strictly controlled. As it flows to the south west, it is crossed by a track, and has already dropped down to 322 feet (98 m). It enters a valley called Wishmoor Bottom, and is crossed by another track, after which it is flanked by another channel on either side. The three parallel channels pass under King's Ride and another track, before they skirt round the back edge of military housing that forms part of the Royal Military Academy Sandhurst estate. Here the three channels are inter-connected with sluices, and one of them enters a large tank, in an area which is described as a "water catchment area". The stream was important for the Academy, as it provided sufficient water to supply all of their needs, even in the summer months. The water is surface drainage from the surrounding moorlands, and tanks in the bed of the river collected the water, which was pumped to reservoirs by a steam engine. The Wish Stream remained the sole source of water for the Academy until the 1960s. Early maps showed a waterworks just to the north of the Bathing Pool, and a covered reservoir to the north-west of that, but by 1911 and on subsequent maps, the waterworks had become a pumping station.

Below the tanks, the remaining two channels continue downwards, passing over weirs and under Dawnay Road, to be joined by several drains, supplied by nearby springs. The water drops into the Bathing Pool over a weir, with a small side-channel bypassing the lake, which has another weir at its outlet. The pool covers an area of 1.63 acres (0.66 ha). Below the pool, the stream used to follow a course to the south-west, to reach the Lower Lake, as the county boundary still does, but in the late 1960s the Academy was expanding, and a new range known as the East Buildings was constructed, with a parade ground on its northern side. The buildings received the Concrete Society Award in 1970, in recognition of their "outstanding excellence in the use of concrete". To accommodate them, a new course was built for the stream that follows the northern and western edges of the rectangle of land on which the East Buildings stand. It consists of a series of small ponds and weirs, and at the south-western corner of the rectangle, the Wish Stream enters the Lower Lake. The surface is 226 feet (69 m) above ordnance datum, and it covers an area of 19.97 acres (8.08 ha). There is another lake to the east, known as the Upper Lake with an area of 9.94 acres (4.02 ha), which collects water from three drains at the far end, and has an overflow which feeds into the Lower Lake.

The outflow from the Lower Lake is crossed by Yorktown Bridge, and is punctuated by a series of weirs as it continues its descent to the Blackwater. It splits into two channels, one labelled Old Mill Stream, with three weirs on it, and the other labelled Wish Stream, with a weir at the upper end. As the channels leave the grounds of the Academy, they enter culverts which have allowed a superstore to be built over them, and emerge on the other side as a single stream. This then passes under the roundabout where the A30, A321 and A331 road meet, but construction of the roundabout in 1990 as part of the Blackwater Valley road scheme meant that the stream had to be diverted to the north, and the section through the roundabout no longer follows the county boundaries. As it enters the Blackwater, it is at 193 feet (59 m) above ordnance datum.

== History ==
In 1800, the land through which the Wish Stream ran was part of the estate of William Pitt, but an agreement was reached in 1801 that the government would buy 450 acres (180 ha) on which to build a college for the training of military personnel. The decision was ratified by Royal Warrant in 1802, and included a Manor House, a farm and a water mill. The site was almost sold again in 1807, due to lack of progress, but work started in 1808, with the construction of a bridge over the outlet of the mill pond, the erection of fencing around the edge of the grounds, and the planting of trees on the slopes below the south-eastern edge of the mill pond. The main building for the college was built just above the mill pond, which was then enlarged to become the Lower Lake, with the sand and gravel removed from the pond being used to hide the lower floor of the College building.

Prior to the excavation of the Bathing Lake, the area where it now is was a swamp, from which the Wish Stream emerged. Work began on creating it in 1814, and it was completed in 1818. The project was not without its difficulties, as the Royal Staff Corps who were carrying out the work asked for protection from the cadets at the Academy, who were using the wheeling planks as rafts on the unfinished Lake. The planks had to be retrieved from the lake when needed, to allow the work to proceed, and they asked that a sergeant be posted to prevent the cadets from interfering with the work. Work on the enlargement of the Lower Lake appears to have been in progress at the same time, certainly in 1818.

The Wish Stream was diverted around the East Buildings, now known as Victory College, and a series of ponds and weirs were created. In order to improve the fishing, the ponds were lined with chalk and gravel, to reduce the acidity of the water, but by 1982 this had been covered by a thick layer of sludge and rotting leaves, raising the acidity again. The ponds on the north side of the Victory College are known as the Upper and Lower Churchill Pools, after the Whinston Churchill memorial hall which overlooks them. On the west side, the ponds were known as the Princes Pool, the Upper and Lower Rose Pools and the Bridge Pool. However, in 1979 the Lower Rose Pool was renamed Plum's Pool, in honour of a member of staff known as 'Plum' Warner on his retirement, acknowledging all the work he had done to create a thriving Trout Fishing Club within the Academy from very small beginnings.

There are a number of listed buildings along the course of the Wish Stream within the Royal Military Academy Sandhurst. They include Government House, which has a main section with three storeys, and a side wing with two storeys. It was built in the late 18th century in mid-Georgian style, and was the manor house at the time the estate was bought for the academy. It was altered in the early 19th century, to become the house for the commanding officer, and is grade II listed. Nearby is the Old College, built between 1807 and 1812 in the Greek Revival style by John Sanders, the architect for the Barrack Department. At the front it has a long symmetrical design, with two storeys and an attic, while to the rear there are three trident-shaped accommodation wings, dating from 1862, and a canteen, dating from around 1910. It is grade II* listed, and the listing includes a number of cast iron lamps attached to the corners. To the north-east of this is the grade II listed New Building, built between 1911 and 1918 to the design of H B Measures, who was the Director of Barrack Construction. It consists of a central officer's mess and canteen, with H-shaped blocks at both sides to accommodate the cadets. Passages link the three parts together, and it is built in the Edwardian Baroque style.

== Ecology ==
The upper Wish Stream is part of the Broadmoor to Bagshot Heaths and Woods Site of Special Scientific Interest (SSSI). The site provides habitat for Dartford warbler, nightjar and woodlark, for which it is internationally important, as well as dragonfly and damselfly populations. Wishmoor Bottom, together with the similar Broadmoor Bottom, are the most important examples of valley bog habitat in the area. Nine species of sphagnum moss grow in Wishmoor Bottom, of which two are particularly notable, and it is also noted for the presence of hare's-tail cotton-grass, crested buckler-fern and marsh fern. Natural England is working with Defence Estates and the Royal Military Academy Sandhurst conservation group to improve the heathland, from "unfavourable recovering" to "favourable" status. This has involved the felling of large numbers of trees, to allow the heath vegetation to regenerate, and surveys of nesting birds indicate that the three species mentioned has increased significantly since the project began. The Upper Lake is a breeding ground for toads, which arrive in their thousands in mid-February or March. The resultant juvenile toads move from the lake to the surrounding grass in June, and then when they are about the size of a little finger nail, they leave the lake and migrate to the woods. They have been known to cover up to 0.5 miles (0.8 km) in a week.

The water that flows down from Wishmoor Cross is generally clear, although tinged with a copper colour from the surrounding peat. It is quite acidic, which limits the growth of weed and insects, and is therefore not at all suitable for trout, which need both of these to thrive. Nevertheless, it has a good population of brown trout and rainbow trout. The Bathing Lake holds good numbers of wild brown trout, which use the gravel beds of the Wish Stream to spawn. The presence of peat in the water causes them to develop a deep golden colouring. The first known introduction of the genus into the river was in 1925, when 200 fish were obtained from the Berkshire Trout Farm at Hungerford. In 1963, the water in the Bathing Lake was tested for acidity, and lime was added to reduce it. Lime was added from time to time throughout the season to maintain the pH at neutral. It became obvious at that time that some rainbow trout were surviving through the winter, which was unexpected. By 1977 it was also evident that the brown trout were breeding successfully, due to the presence of smaller fish than those that were used to stock the river. The rainbow trout grow faster than brown trout, but are unlikely to breed in English waters.

When the Wish Stream was diverted around the East Buildings, the new ponds were made of concrete, but were lined with chalk and gravel to manage the acidity. By 1982, a thick layer of sludge and rotting leaves had formed over the bed, and consideration was given as to how to remove this. Brown trout and rainbow trout are introduced into the river most years. In 1982, some 2,500 fish were added to the water, of which around 2,000 were caught and eaten. Prolonged heavy rain in the summer of 1985 resulted in the acidity rising, and a number of trout died. The lakes also support populations of coarse fish, and from time to time these are removed using nets and stunning equipment. Coarse fish include roach and perch, and in the 1960s around 20,000 per year were being removed.

As part of their responsibility under the Water Framework Directive, the Environment Agency assessed the ecological status of the Wish Stream in 2009 and 2010, and the barriers to migration of fish. Upstream of the Bathing Lake, they found a good population of wild brown trout, but none below the Lower Lake, because the habitat was degraded, and the weirs form major barriers to fish movement. They recommended some low cost improvements, which were carried out, including coppicing of trees, to allow more light to reach the stream, clearance of rhododendrons growing along the bank, and the introduction of woody debris into the channel to improve habitat.

The Wild Trout Trust undertook a further survey in 2012, particularly of the stretch within the grounds of the Royal Military Academy Sandhurst. They found that the section above the Bathing Pool was largely unmanaged, with woody debris providing cover for the trout, and gravels suitable for spawning. However, there was one section where the river ran through a concrete pipe, which forms part of the cadet obstacle course, where the water was fast-running but very shallow. Fish that were washed downstream into the Bathing Pool were unlikely to be able to negotiate this to return to the upper reaches. The sequence of pools around the East Buildings suffered from a lack of cover, little marginal vegetation, and were heavily silted. The connections between the pools were shallow concrete channels, again making migration by fish difficult. The outflow from the Lower Lake is a large stepped weir structure, with the water then running through a shallow concrete culvert, both of which are impassable to fish. The high weirs below the lake slow the passage of water, causing silt to smother the bed of the stream. The culverts below the retail park and the roundabout were not thought to be an obstale to fish, as they normally contain a good depth of water.

Recommendations to improve the stream as habitat for wild trout included alteration to the concrete pipe on the upper reaches, alteration to the margins of the pools between the two lakes, possibly including floating islands, and alteration of the weirs and overflow structure of the Lower Lake. It was recognised that without the weirs being altered, there was little point in modifying the overflow structure, and that while the previous recommendations could be carried out at little cost, the final section would probably need external funding, as it would require heavy machinery to carry out the work.

== Bibliography ==
- Jones, Rebekah, ed. (2009). "Spotlight on... Sandhurst Conservation Group" (PDF). Sanctuary - The Ministry of Defence Conservation Magazine. No. 38. Ministry of Defence. pp. 67–68. Archived (PDF) from the original on 25 July 2019.
- Mockler-Ferryman, Major A F (1900). Annuls of Sandhurst. William Heinemann.
- Thomas, Andy (July 2012). "Wish Stream – Royal Military Academy Sandhurst" (PDF). Wild Trout Trust. Archived (PDF) from the original on 19 June 2020.
