= Blackwater, Hampshire =

Town in Hampshire, England

Coordinates: 51.328182°N 0.774248°W

Blackwater
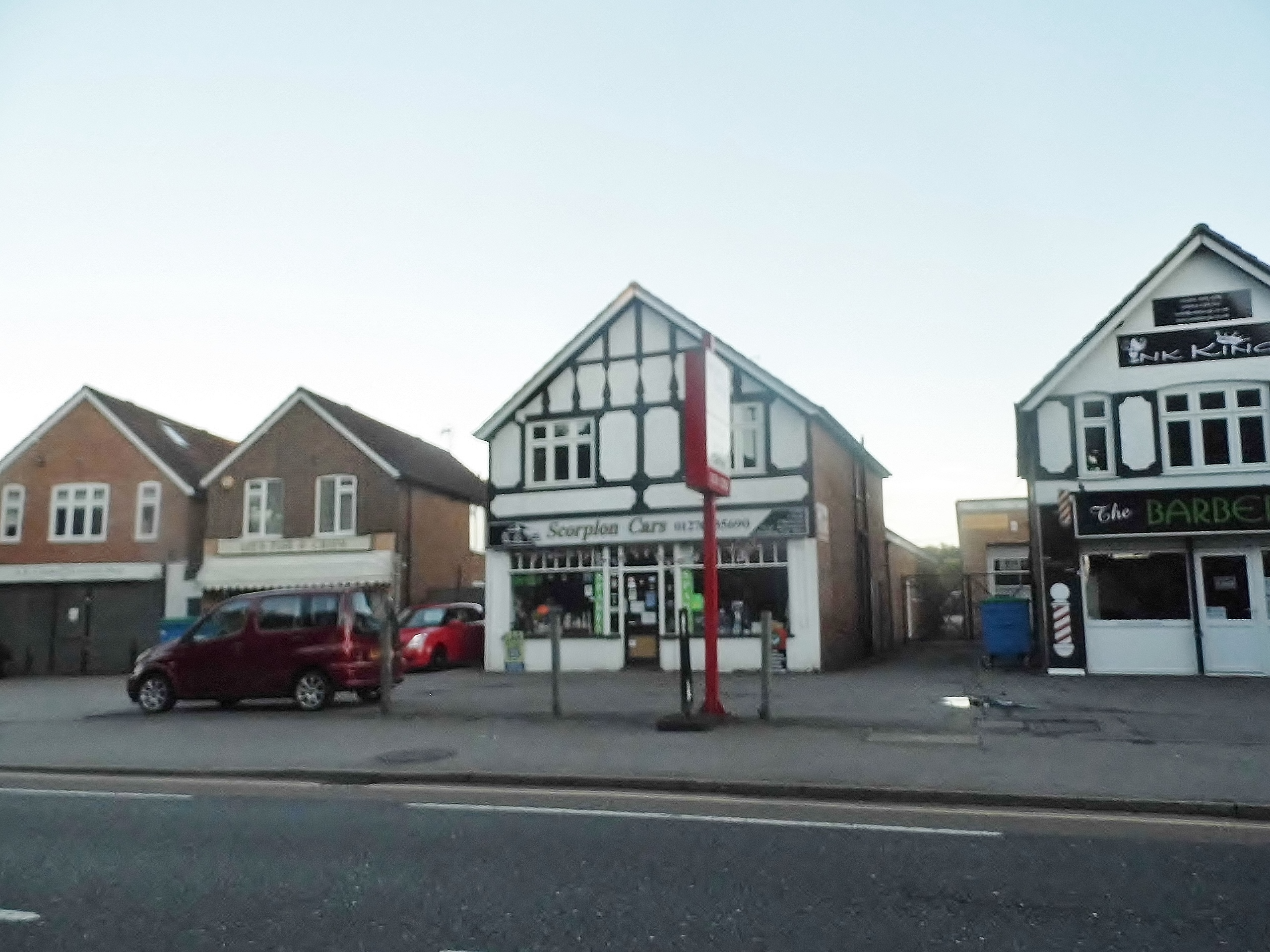
- London Road, Blackwater

- Location within Hampshire
- Population: 7,169
- OS grid reference: SU855595
- Civil parish: Blackwater and Hawley
- District: Hart
- Shire county: Hampshire
- Region: South East
- Country: England
- Sovereign state: United Kingdom
- Post town: CAMBERLEY
- Postcode district: GU17
- Dialling code: 01252; 01276
- Police: Hampshire and Isle of Wight
- Fire: Hampshire and Isle of Wight
- Ambulance: South Central
- UK Parliament: Aldershot

Blackwater is a town in the Hart District of Hampshire, England. It forms part of the Farnborough/Aldershot Built-up Area and almost is contiguous with Camberley, and situated 32 miles (51 km) west-southwest of London.

A pre-1900 distance sign near the nightclub on the A30, in Camberley marks "London - 30 miles", from which the centre of Blackwater is less than a mile.

The town is in the outer half of the London Commuter Belt, the fastest link being Farnborough (Main) Station on the South Western Main Line. The place sits west of where the A30 trunk road from London to Land's End crosses the River Blackwater. It is served by Blackwater railway station which is on the non-interchanging line, midway between Reading and Guildford.

== History ==
The first record of Blackwater, archived and known, is in 1281, when it was known as Bredeford. It grew around the ford (soon after seen as Brydrs Ford) across the Blackwater.

The White Hart Parade of shops and offices, to the west of Blackwater station, is named after the White Hart coaching inn that occupied the site in the late 19th century.

== Transport connections ==
Trains from Blackwater station operate with a half-hourly service to Reading, and to Gatwick Airport or the shorter-stop Redhill both via Guildford. Trains do not operate directly to London, requiring a change to London Paddington at Reading, or to London Waterloo at Guildford or Wokingham. At peak times, some additional trains operate; which usually go beyond Guildford to Shalford. Trains are operated by Great Western Railway.

Train passengers seeking to commute to Farnborough North for the Sixth Form College or for London-bound trains from nearby Farnborough Main are advised that these are on the few full-stopping-services only, as a semi-fast stopping pattern prevailingly operates for convenience of the whole line and regional transport.

Buses to Camberley operate every 15 minutes via Route 3.

== Local economy ==
Blackwater is a gateway town into Hampshire on a main national route (the A30). This 'high street' area is a dual-carriageway which subsides to singled west of the town. It passes over Blackwater railway station, as well as passing over the River Blackwater itself. Aldi, and shortly after a new Lidl supermarket was built opposite Aldi (formerly Robert Greig) in 2003, taking up most of the town's retail footprint. Blackwater has two public houses, The Royal Swan and Mr Bumble. There are two parades of shops which include food outlets, a pharmacy, a newsagent and a vinyl record store.

The closest sizeable town of note is Camberley, which provides many jobs for residents of Blackwater due to its wide range of shops, particularly within The Mall, Camberley. Other nearby towns include Sandhurst, home to the Royal Military Academy, and Yateley. Blackwater is considered a commuter town to these neighbouring settlements, and also to the larger commercial centres of Farnborough, Aldershot, Bracknell, Wokingham and Basingstoke.

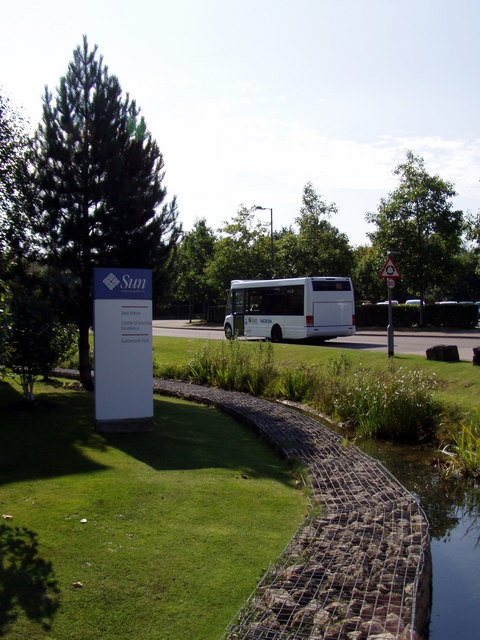
Entrance to Java House, Sun Microsystems

Sun Microsystems were a major employer in the Blackwater Valley and their UK headquarters were in Blackwater at Guillemont Park in neighbouring Minley, at the M3 motorway junction on the site of the former Guillemont Barracks. Following Oracle's acquisition of Sun in 2009, employees were relocated to Oracle's UK headquarters in the Thames Valley Park.

== Suburbs ==
There are two suburban villages to the north, Frogmore and Darby Green, which are considered by Hart District council to be districts of Blackwater. Frogmore has its own modern village hall, village green, church and a small shopping parade. Darby Green has a shopping parade (including a Tesco Express) and a small youth centre. There is also a modern medical surgery between the two villages on Frogmore Road.

The village of Hawley, which has its own village hall, primary school, church, private leisure centre and equestrian centre, lies less than 0.6 miles (1 km) to the south on the road towards Farnborough.

== Popular culture ==
A major portion of Wilkie Collins's 1859 novel The Woman in White is set at the house of the character Sir Percivel Glyde, Blackwater Park, in Blackwater, Hampshire.

== Notable Residents ==
- Alexa Goddard

== Nearby towns and villages ==
- Yateley
- Sandhurst
- Camberley
- Farnborough
- Crowthorne
- Bracknell
- Reading
- Hartley Wintney
