= River Blackwater (River Loddon) =

Tributary of the River Loddon in England

Blackwater (Loddon)
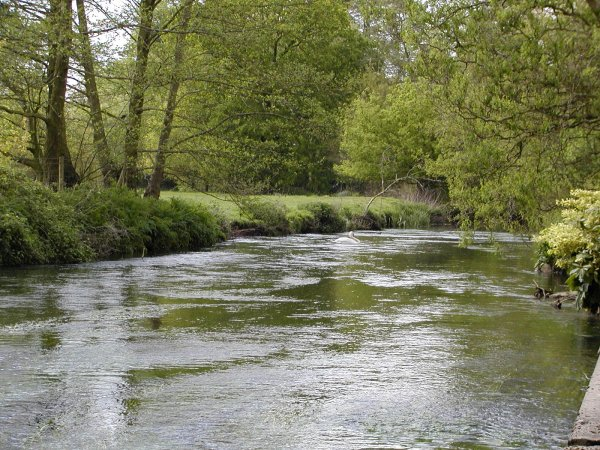
- River Blackwater at Eversley bridge

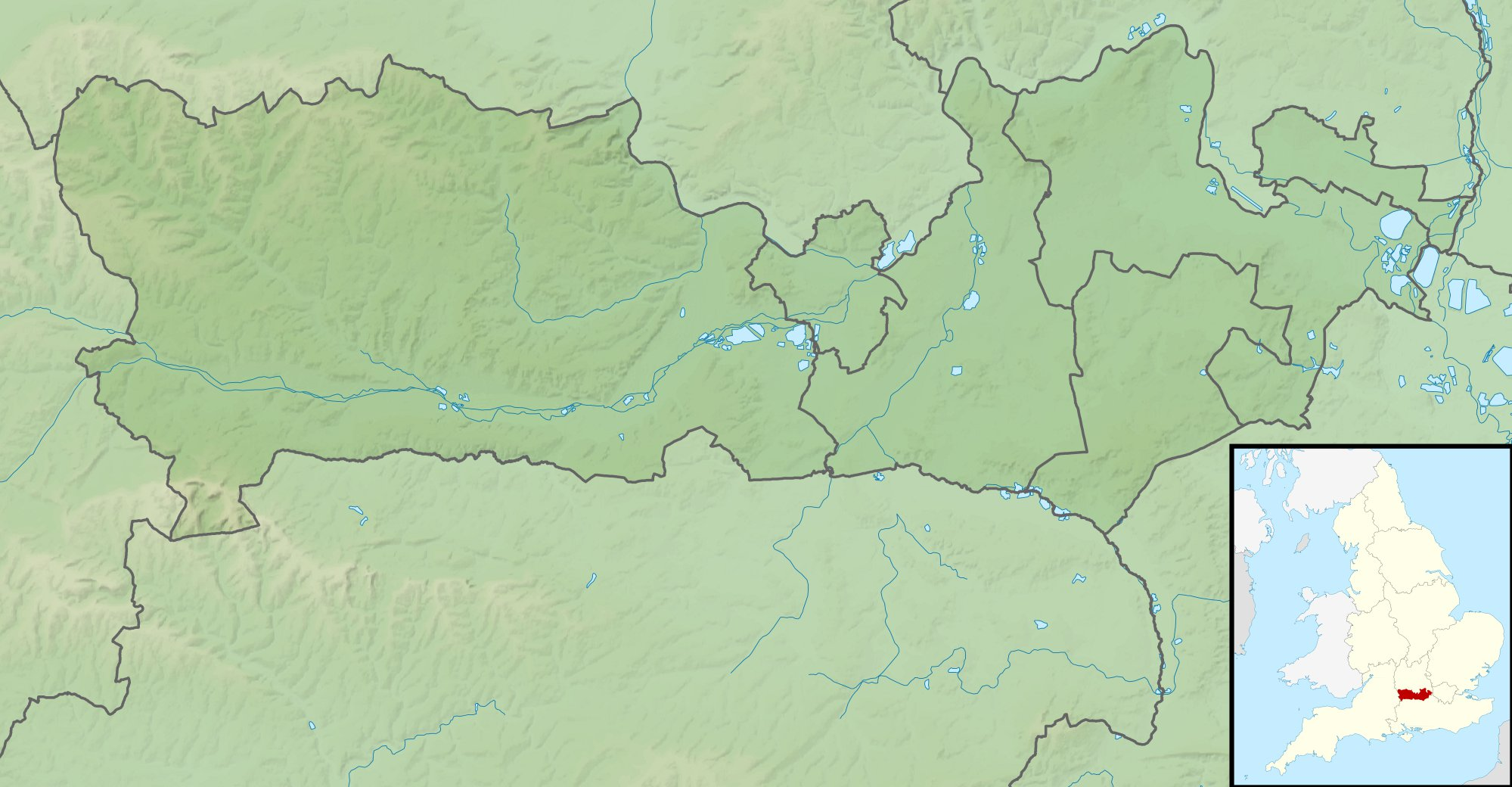
- Place of mouth (confluence with the Loddon) in Berkshire

Location
- Country: England
- Counties: Hampshire, Surrey, Berkshire
- Districts / Boroughs: Waverley (borough), Surrey Heath, Rushmoor, Borough of Wokingham

Physical characteristics
- Source
  - location: Rowhill Nature Reserve south of Aldershot, north of Farnham. County: Surrey.
  - coordinates: 51°14′31″N 0°47′13″W
  - elevation: 125 m (410 ft)
- Mouth: River Loddon
  - location: Berkshire
  - coordinates: 51°23′06″N 0°57′29″W
  - elevation: 41 m (135 ft)
- Length: 36 km (22 mi)
- Discharge
  - location: Swallowfield
  - average: 3.07 m^{3}/s (108 cu ft/s)
  - minimum: 0.48 m^{3}/s (17 cu ft/s)(17 August 1953)
  - maximum: 42.3 m^{3}/s (1,490 cu ft/s)(17 September 1968)
- Discharge
  - location: Farnborough
  - average: 0.52 m^{3}/s (18 cu ft/s)

Basin features
- Progression: Blackwater, Loddon, Thames
- River system: Thames Basin
- Tributaries
  - left: Cove Brook, River Whitewater
  - right: Wish Stream

The River Blackwater is a tributary of the Loddon in England and sub-tributary of the Thames. It rises at two springs in Rowhill Nature Reserve between Aldershot, Hampshire and Farnham, Surrey. It curves a course north then west to join the Loddon in Swallowfield civil parish, central Berkshire. Part of the river splits Hampshire from Surrey; a smaller part does so as to Hampshire and Berkshire.

The source is locally rare heath within the Thames Basin Heaths Special Protection Area, due to the Farnborough/Aldershot Built-up Area.

After 20 miles (32 km) the Blackwater is joined by the Whitewater near Eversley. The river gives its name to the town of Blackwater, extending back from the bank facing Camberley, and the wider urban area including Aldershot, Farnborough, and Camberley is sometimes collectively referred to as the Blackwater Valley.

== Naming ==
This article reverses the term found by Ordnance Survey mapmakers, old and continued there, Blackwater River.

A stretch west of Finchampstead is called Long Water in 1897 and on recent maps. The adjacent final section from the Whitewater to the Loddon is known by alternative names. In Ordnance Survey maps: the 1:50,000 calls it as in general; the 1:25,000 calls it (the) Broadwater; the 1:2500 calls it as in general at each end and Broadwater in the middle, reflecting local broadening. This last option was the convention in the 1899 (forerunner) map at that scale.

== Blackwater Valley ==
The river runs along the centre of the Blackwater Valley, which is maintained as a largely tree-planted open space, with some bog, marsh and water-meadows. It runs for approximately 22.5 miles (36 km) from the source at Rowhill Nature Reserve near Aldershot in the south, northwards to Swallowfield where the river is joined by the "Whitewater" and then joins the River Loddon. The Loddon flows into the Thames on the southern borders of Wargrave.

For many miles banks of the lower half are semi-rural or rural. The upper half of the river for more than a mile each side is highly urbanised – the river passes Aldershot, Ash, Ash Vale, Frimley, Farnborough, Camberley, Blackwater, Sandhurst and Yateley; the continuous urbanisation extends to Fleet in the west and to Farnham in the south, with a combined population of over 300,000 people at the 2011 Census. Beneath the catchment are chalk, Bagshot Formation sand and greensand aquifers, covered by varying depths of London clay-based soil, mostly very weakly permeable. Some of the water flows from springs from the aquifers, but by far the largest component of the flow is the discharge from five major sewage treatment works on the upper reaches and two smaller ones on the lower reaches. The springs are quite acidic for natural, non-hydrothermal springs. After flowing over the London clay deposits, the underlying geology is more permeable near the mouth, the "Bagshot and Bracklesham" Sands. In 1992, the five works could discharge up to 74.4 Ml per day, and in summer months accounted for around 85% of flow above the confluence with the Whitewater.

The valley has large pockets of deep gravels, quarried since the 1950s. This explains the many lakes in the valley, as old workings (pits) fill with water. Many have been landscaped as park lakes and used for fishing and sailing. A number of them are designated Sites of Special Scientific Interest (SSSI), having rich and diverse ecology. The Blackwater Valley SSSI covers 86.55 acres (35.03 ha), comprising unimproved alluvial meadows, swamp, and wet woodland. Part of it is managed by the Berkshire, Buckinghamshire and Oxfordshire Naturalists Trust. The rest is managed by Bracknell Forest Council, Shepherd Meadows. The river is crossed by a small part of the Basingstoke Canal SSSI, which supports the widest variety of aquatic species in England.

The Valley is the key verdant buffer zone and park amenity for local residents. As well as the SSSIs, there are three nature reserves. Much of the rest of the drainage basin not built upon is ecologically important. Thirty-one 'Wildlife Sites' have been designated by the local planning authorities and a 23-mile (37 km) riverside path has opened up much of the riverbank. A large running club in local ranks use the path regularly.

A cycle route runs alongside the river for most of its length.

== Route ==
The Blackwater rises as a series of springs on Rowhill Copse, a nature reserve to the south-west of Aldershot. The 55-acre (22 ha) site contains a range of habitats, its estate once produced timber and bricks. The river curves east-south-east, passing under the railway line to Aldershot station, between two lakes, under Badshot Lea Road and past some more lakes, which form part of Tice's Meadow nature reserve, a hop farm from 1851 until 1958, after which 140 acres (57 ha) were quarried by Hanson Aggregates between 1998 and 2010. The site was adopted as a Site of Nature Conservation Interest (SNCI) in 2009, and was restored after quarrying stopped. Beyond, the river sweeps a large curve to head northwards, and is joined by the A331, which follows the valley until past most of the conurbation. From its source up until the three-county tripoint east of Blackwater station, the river almost exactly marks the longstanding boundary between the counties of Surrey and Hampshire.

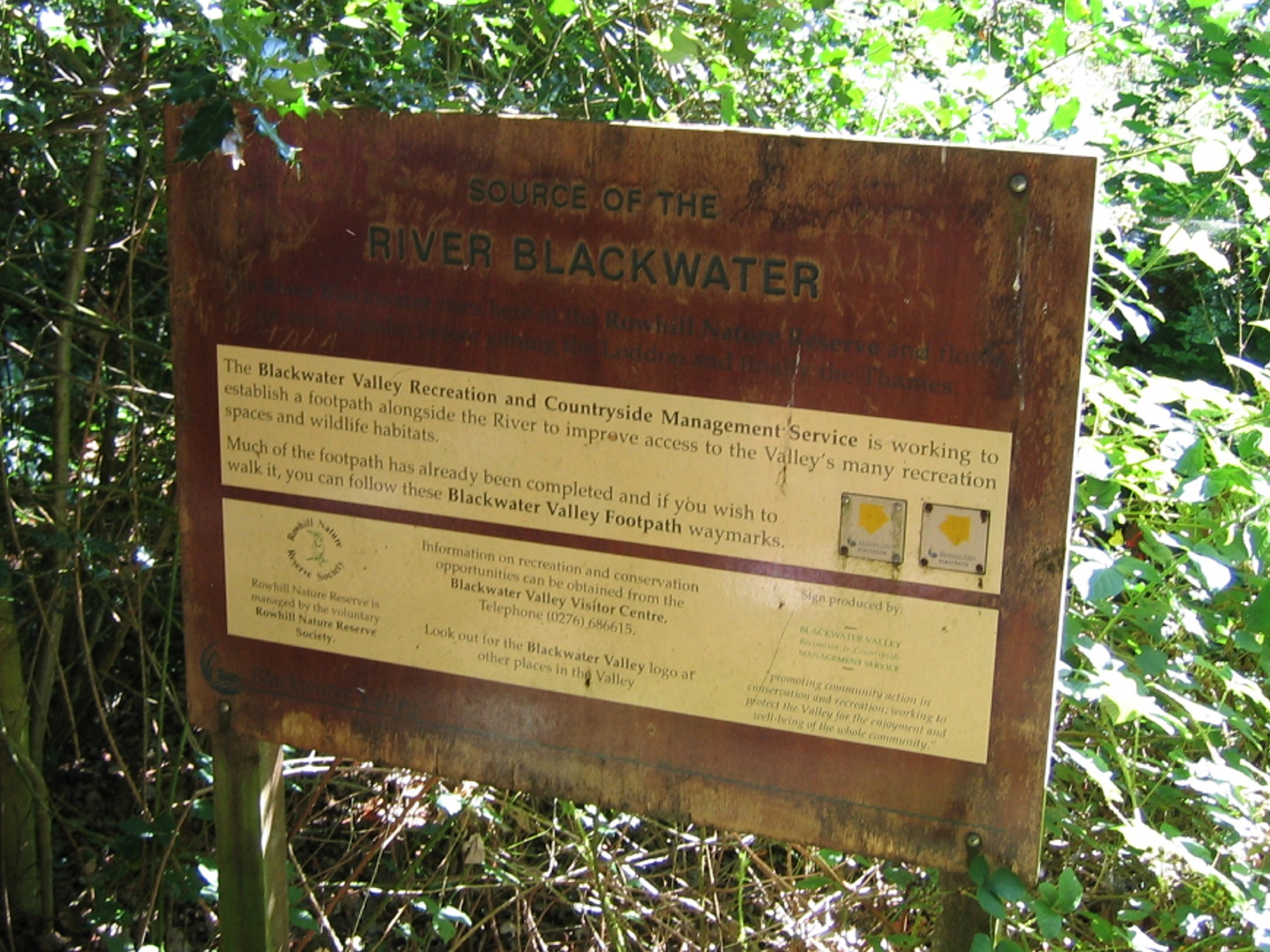
The Source of the River Blackwater at Rowhill Nature Reserve

On the left bank is Aldershot sewage treatment works that in dry weather supplies more than half of the local flow opposite is Willow Park Fishery. The river passes under an aqueduct carrying the Basingstoke Canal, and is then bordered by Lakeside Nature Reserve to the east and Gold Valley Lakes fishery to the west. The A331 road makes the first of the crossings. Further north is Hollybush Park, an ex-sand quarry and deep-set landfill, now an attractive grassland with wild flowers. The lakes to the north were the subject of a Planning Enquiry in 2020, to build 21 floating holiday homes and an equestrian centre. The tree-lined river path is hemmed in by railways, roads, and small lakes and is crossed by the railway line to Farnborough station, continuing north close to the A331, until it reaches junction 4 on the M3 motorway.

After the M3 junction, the river is joined by Cove Brook, which starts as a series of streams near Farnborough Airport and flows northwards. For much of its route it is bordered by housing on both sides, but then passes beneath the North Downs railway line to reach the junction. The tree-lined section immediately afterwards was once a gas works and railway sidings, but is now known as Blackwater Park, as far as the A30 road bridge. The small town of Blackwater is on the left bank and Camberley sewage treatment works is on the right bank at York Town. This was the cause of a serious pollution incident in 2012, when a malfunction resulted in partially treated effluent released, contaminating the river for 1 mile (1.6 km) downstream. This resulted in fish in the Shepherds Meadow SSSI suffocating and dying. Thames Water upgraded the works after the incident.

To the north of the bridge, the river is joined by the Wish Stream demarcating Surrey and Berkshire. This rises at Wishmoor Cross, in a danger area with restricted access, and flows to the south west along Wishmoor Bottom, a pineferous wood-lined, boggy ravine. It is part of a Site of Special Scientific Interest (SSSI) because of its populations of Dartford warbler, nightjar and woodlark, and is a nationally important habitat for dragonfly and damselfly. The stream then flows through the grounds of the Royal Military Academy Sandhurst, entering Bathing Pool, and then passing through a series of engineered ponds and weirs, which create a significant obstacle to the movement of fish, to reach the Lower Lake. This is also supplied with water from the Upper Lake, to the south of the stream. There is a large control structure at the outlet of the Lower Lake, impassable to fish, and then a series of high weirs of that status. Below the grounds of the Academy, the stream flows in a culvert under a car park for a retail outlet, and several more culverts under roads to reach the Blackwater. The confluence used to be the point at the three-county tripoint, but when the Blackwater Valley road was built in 1990, the stream was moved slightly north, for the roundabout that links the A30, A321 and A331 roads.

The river then flows through Shepherd Meadows, an SSSI noted for the Black Poplar tree, and a variety of wild flowers, including sneezewort, knapweed, betony, meadowsweet and great burnet. As the river curves to the west, it passes under the North Downs Line railway bridge, flows past Sandhurst sewage treatment works on the right bank and enters Trilakes Country Park. Former gravel pits flank the river on both sides, and as it passes the village of Finchampstead, the channel is briefly called Long Water. Soon it reaches New Mill, where there is a weir and sluice. The mill was a corn mill in 1871 and produced animal feed until the 1950s, when the building was sold. The watermill and mill house are grade II listed, with parts of the buildings dating from the 15th century. They were subsequently used as a restaurant, with the restored mill wheel, gears and machinery visible from the seating area, encased behind glass screens. The river follows the northern edge of Bramshill Plantation, 3,200 acres (13 km^{2}) of woodland managed by the Forestry Commission. It is a Special Protection Area in view of the number of bird species to be found there, and also has large populations of damselflies, dragonflies and silver studded blue butterflies. Notable flora includes marsh clubmoss and pillwort.

The river turns to the north-west, and is joined by the River Whitewater, flowing northwards from Greywell, near Greywell Tunnel, the present end of the Basingstoke Canal. As it approaches Swallowfield, the channel splits and there are weirs on both branches. They enter Swallowfield Park, a grade II listed park and gardens. The park was enclosed by King Edward III in 1354, and remained the property of the monarch until the late 16th century, after which it was privately owned until 1965. The large country house was built in the late 17th century, was altered in 1820, and restored in the 1970s. The house and adjoining stable block are grade II* listed. The main drive to the house crosses the river on a five-arched brick bridge, dating from the late 18th century. The river continues through the park until it reaches the River Loddon.

== Milling ==
There is clear evidence for one watermill on the Blackwater, but when the Domesday Book was compiled in 1086 there were four mills in the locality. The manors of Little Bramshill and Great Bramshill had one each, while there were two in the manor of Eversley. By 1237, the manor of Eversley was owned by William de Wauton, who mentioned a mill pond in an agreement he made with a tenant called William Banastre. When a dower was assigned to Ella de Bradeston in 1374, to provide for her should she become widowed, there was only one mill, which was ruined by 1435. There is no subsequent mention of a mill in the records of the manor.

New Mill at Eversley dates in part from the 15th century, with 17th, 19th and 20th century alterations and additions. It is powered by an undershot water wheel, in the mill building. In 1948 it was bought by Squadron Leader Royston Albrecht, who restored it almost single-handedly between 1949 and 1976. He was a member of the Society for the Protection of Ancient Buildings, who used the restored mill to produce provender. Some of the machinery is believed to date from 1746, and the wheel drives two pairs of stones. The building was sold in 1995 to become a restaurant, and as part of the conversion process, a refurbished waterwheel was fitted while the machinery was shielded by a glass screen so that it could be seen from the restaurant area. The restaurant became insolvent in 2012 and closed down.

== Ash Aqueduct ==
The Basingstoke Canal runs from the Greywell Tunnel at Greywell in the west to the River Wey in the east, and crosses the Blackwater Valley on an embankment in the village of Ash. The Blackwater used to flow through a brick culvert under the embankment, but major reconstruction took place over the winter of 1994-95 as part of a project to route the A331 road along the river valley. Because bats were known to roost in the culvert, a new home for them was built on a nearby island. The central section of the embankment was then removed and replaced with a three-span aqueduct, with a centre span of 130 feet (40 m) and two side spans of 56 feet (17 m) each. The structure was built of post-tensioned concrete, using four cables on each side of the navigation channel, which were jacked apart until each was exerting a force of 820 tonnes to keep the concrete in compression. In order to avoid the aqueduct piers, the river channel was diverted to run through the western side span, and a new course was constructed until the road had risen sufficiently for a box-section culvert to carry the river under the new road to rejoin its original route. The new Ash Aqueduct affords views of the surrounding countryside. In the distance to the south is the Hog's Back, which runs between Farnham and Guildford, and is where the North Downs narrows.

== Water quality ==
The Environment Agency measures water quality of the river systems in England. Each is given an overall ecological status, which may be one of five levels: high, good, moderate, poor and bad. There are several components that are used to determine this, including biological status, which looks at the quantity and varieties of invertebrates, angiosperms and fish, and chemical status, which compares the concentrations of various chemicals against known safe concentrations. Chemical status is rated good or fail.

The water quality of the Blackwater system was as follows in 2019.

Section	Ecological Status	Chemical Status	Overall Status	Length	Catchment
Blackwater (Aldershot to Cove Brook confluence at Hawley)	Moderate	Fail	Moderate	10.3 mi (16.6 km)	24.34 sq mi (63.0 km^{2})
Cove Brook	Poor	Fail	Poor	4.4 mi (7.1 km)	8.80 sq mi (22.8 km^{2})
Blackwater (Hawley to Whitewater confluence at Bramshill)	Moderate	Fail	Moderate	10.3 mi (16.6 km)	27.26 sq mi (70.6 km^{2})
Blackwater (Bramshill to River Loddon confluence at Swallowfield)	Poor	Fail	Poor	1.8 mi (2.9 km)	2.40 sq mi (6.2 km^{2})

Reasons for the quality being less than good include discharge from sewage treatment works; drainage from roads and transport infrastructure; contaminated land adjacent to the river; physical barriers such as weirs and impounding of the water which prevent the free migration of fish and other species; and the presence of the North American signal crayfish, an invasive species.

== See also ==
- List of rivers in England

== Bibliography ==
- Cumberlidge, Jane (2009). Inland Waterways of Great Britain (8th Ed.). Imray Laurie Norie and Wilson. ISBN 978-1-84623-010-3.
- Eighteen, Brian (2000). "Watermills on the River Loddon". Wargrave Local History Society. Archived from the original on 14 January 2017.
- McEwan, Fergus (19 February 2015). "Thames Water fined for sewage spillage into Camberley river". Surrey Live. Archived from the original on 2 May 2015.
- NRA (November 1992). "Blackwater River Catchment Management Plan" (PDF). National Rivers Authority. Archived (PDF) from the original on 20 June 2020.
- Page, William, ed. (1911). "Parishes: Eversley". A History of the County of Hampshire. Victoria Country History. Vol. 4. British History Online.
- Phillips, Jamie (23 April 2020). "Aldershot site identified for holiday camp". Surrey Live. Archived from the original on 30 April 2020.
- Vaidya, Ashok, ed. (2013). The Mills and Millers of Hampshire. Vol. 3 - North and East. Hampshire Mills Group.
- WTT (July 2012). "Wish Stream – Royal Military Academy Sandhurst" (PDF). Wild Trout Trust. Archived (PDF) from the original on 19 June 2020.
