= Cove, Hampshire =

Village and parish in Hampshire, England

Coordinates: 51.2965°N 0.7939°W

Cove
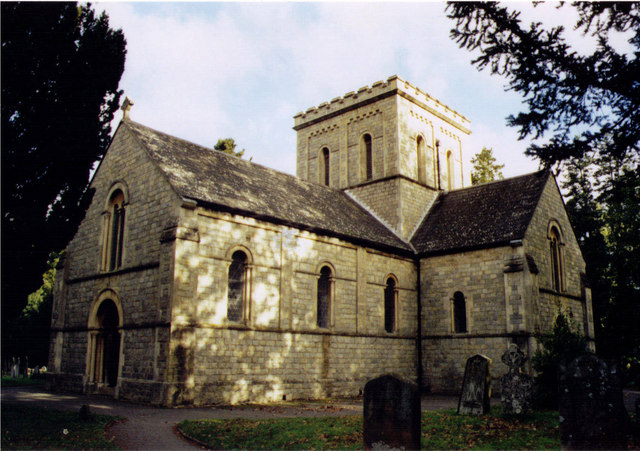
- St John the Baptist

- Location within Hampshire
- Population: 6,548; 5,893 (2011 Census. Cove and Southwood Ward)
- OS grid reference: SU850565
  - London: 33 miles
- District: Rushmoor
- Shire county: Hampshire
- Region: South East
- Country: England
- Sovereign state: United Kingdom
- Post town: FARNBOROUGH
- Postcode district: GU14
- Dialling code: 01252
- Police: Hampshire and Isle of Wight
- Fire: Hampshire and Isle of Wight
- Ambulance: South East Coast
- UK Parliament: Aldershot

Cove is an ancient village turned suburb, forming the western part of Farnborough, in the Rushmoor district, in the county of Hampshire, England. The appropriate ward is called Cove and Southwood. It is located 33 mi (53 km) south west of London. Cove is adjacent to Hawley village and Southwood.

== History ==
Cove is mentioned in the Domesday Book. The entry from 1086, reads "Germanus holds from the Bishop 8 hides of this land in ITCHEL and COVE".

The Farnborough workhouse was located in Workhouse Lane, Cove (now known as Union street). This workhouse was built before 1832, was closed in 1868, sold in 1871 and demolished in the 1980s. The building was named Wilmot House, after the lord of the manor.

Cove was formerly a tything and chapelry in the parish of Yateley, in 1866 Cove became a separate civil parish, on 1 April 1932 the parish was abolished and merged with Farnborough and Hawley. In 1931 the parish had a population of 3228. It is now in the unparished area of Farnborough.

== Present day ==
Cove is now a suburb of Farnborough. Cove School is a secondary school located in the area. The local football team is Cove F.C.

== Geology ==
The only naturally occurring water features that still exist in Cove are Cove Brook and Marrowbrook (which was once the outlet to the lake on Cove Common). There was once a pond on Cove Green.
