= Cove School, Hampshire =

Cove School

Location
- St John's Road; Cove; Farnborough, Hampshire, GU14 9RN; England
- Coordinates: 51.2998°N 0.7769°W

Information
- Type: Foundation school
- Local authority: Hampshire
- Department for Education URN: 116446 Tables
- Ofsted: Reports
- Headteacher: Andrew King
- Gender: Coeducational
- Age: 11 to 16
- Enrolment: 883 as of January 2023
- Website: http://www.cove.hants.sch.uk/

Cove School is a coeducational secondary school located in the Cove area of Farnborough in the English county of Hampshire.

It was first established as Cove and South Hawley Council School in June 1877 in buildings on Fernhill Road now occupied by Cove Junior School. The school transferred to its present site in 1937. Today Cove is a foundation school administered by Hampshire County Council, which coordinates the schools admissions.
