= Yateley School =

Coordinates: 51.338°N 0.837°W

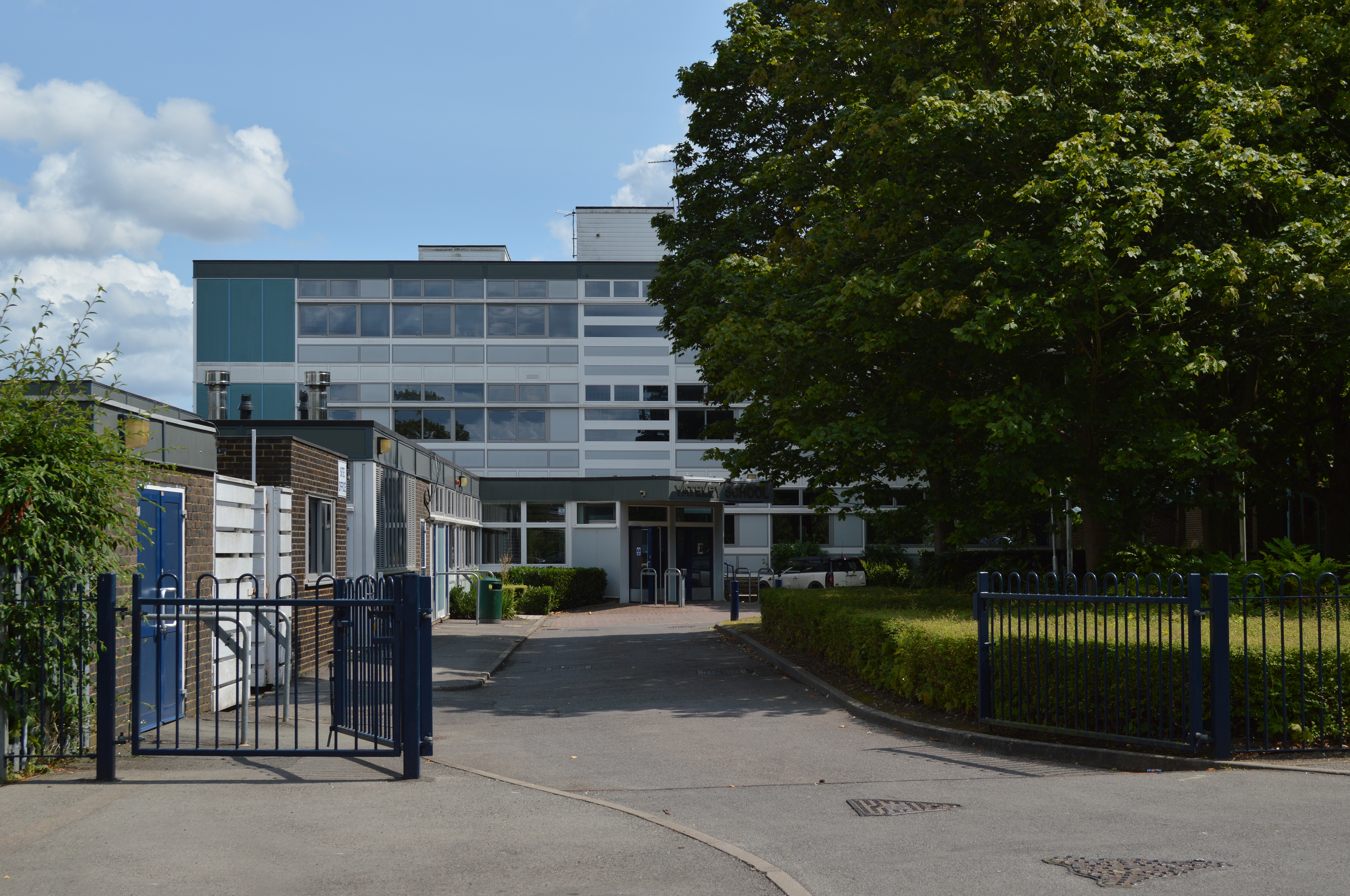

Location
- School Lane; Yateley, Hampshire, GU46 6NW; England

Information
- Type: Community school
- Motto: Ready Respectful Safe
- Local authority: Hampshire
- Department for Education URN: 116433 Tables
- Ofsted: Reports
- Headteacher: Paul German
- Staff: approximately 90
- Gender: Mixed
- Age: 11 to 18
- Enrolment: 1,129
- Houses: Darwin, Pankhurst, Nightingale and Wilberforce
- Colours: Green (Darwin), Yellow (Pankhurst), Red (Nightingale) and Blue (Wilberforce)
- Website: www.yateleyschool.net

Yateley School is a secondary school in North East Hampshire. The school teaches over 1500 students aged 11 – 16, and the attached sixth form college caters for ages 16–18.

== Inspections ==
The school had its latest Ofsted inspection in 2018. The school achieved a good rating, and the sixth form achieved an outstanding rating.

== House system ==
The school uses the house system. It has four houses: (Charles) Darwin, (Emmeline) Pankhurst, (Florence) Nightingale and (William) Wilberforce.

== Campus ==
Yateley School's facilities include a swimming pool, drama studios, a library, a sports hall, a gymnastics hall, dance and music studios, tennis courts and three playing fields.

== Notable former pupils ==
- Chris Benham, former Hampshire cricketer
- David Copeland, the "London Nail Bomber"
- Alexa Goddard, pop singer and YouTube personality
- Aaron Kuhl, semi-professional footballer
- Lloyd Macklin, semi-professional footballer
- Kerry Shacklock International synchronised swimmer
- Breathe (British band), 1980s band
