= Guillemont Barracks =

- Minley
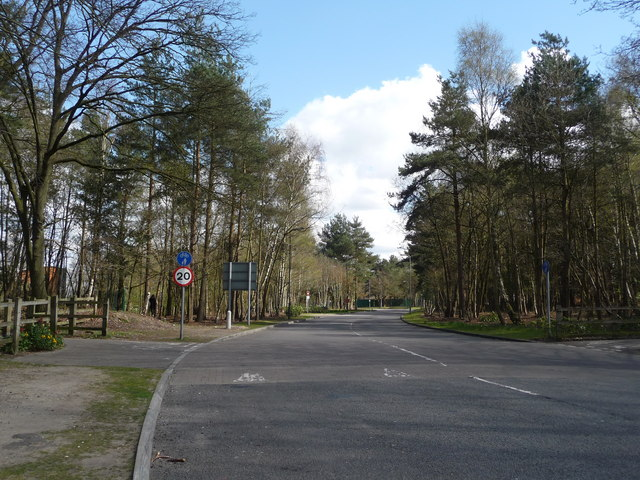
- The road into the former Guillemont Barracks site

Site information
- Type: Barracks
- Owner: Ministry of Defence
- Operator: British Army

Location
- Location within Hampshire
- Coordinates: 51.3045°N 0.7940°W

Site history
- Built: 1938
- Built for: War Office
- In use: 1938–c.1965

Guillemont Barracks, located just off of junction 4a of the M3, on the Minley Road (A327), was a military installation at Minley in Hampshire.

== History ==
=== Military use ===
The barracks were built in 1938. Covering 13.7ha, they were named after the German-held village of Guillemont, which was retaken by the British Expeditionary Force, in September 1916, during the Battle of the Somme. The West Nova Scotia Regiment arrived at the barracks on 1 January 1940, and the Les Fusiliers Mont-Royal, part of the Canadian 5th Brigade, were stationed at the barracks in late 1940. King George VI and Queen Elizabeth inspected the troops on 26 March 1941. The 3rd Training Regiment of the Royal Engineers were based there from 1954 until the early 1960s. It then became the home of the 1st Battalion the Parachute Regiment between 1963 and 1965.

=== Later development ===
The site was purchased by Sun Microsystems in 1997 for £36 million, to construct a large campus site for around 4,500 staff with data centres and UK headquarters, and was named Guillemont Park. Only the 3 largest (280,000 sq ft) of the planned 5 buildings were completed due to the Dot-com crash. Property developer, Landid, bought the site in January 2011 and renamed it Sun Park. In 2018, Bellway started a new residential development named Helios Park with 226 new houses.
