= House Gymnastics =

Sport

House Gymnastics is a sport created by James Robert Ford and Spencer Harrison.

This fitness regime is akin to an indoor version of Parkour or an internet based, Fluxus "happening", which encourages maximum audience participation. The participant uses their surroundings in their house as apparatus. When someone performs House Gymnastics, the aim is to create human sculptures that last around 3 seconds. Viewers can sign up as members, submit photos and enter the Move of Month competition.

== Origins ==
House Gymnastics originated during an attempt by Harrison and Ford to put up a bedroom blind. "The Brace" and "The 25th Element" were the first moves conceived. From there on in moves were being created on a daily basis. Language was developed to complement the physicality of House Gymnastics, and new moves and areas of were given names. As such, words such as "busted" and "amped" were developed and entered the "House Gymnastics" vocabulary.

== Injuries ==
Injuries due to the sport are seen as unfortunate, but inevitable, and one reviewer of the site and product said it would be more likely to lead to a trip to the hospital than a thrill, for people who are not trained professionals.
