= Long Sutton, Hampshire =

Village and parish in Hampshire, England

Coordinates: 51.220615°N 0.942869°W

Long Sutton
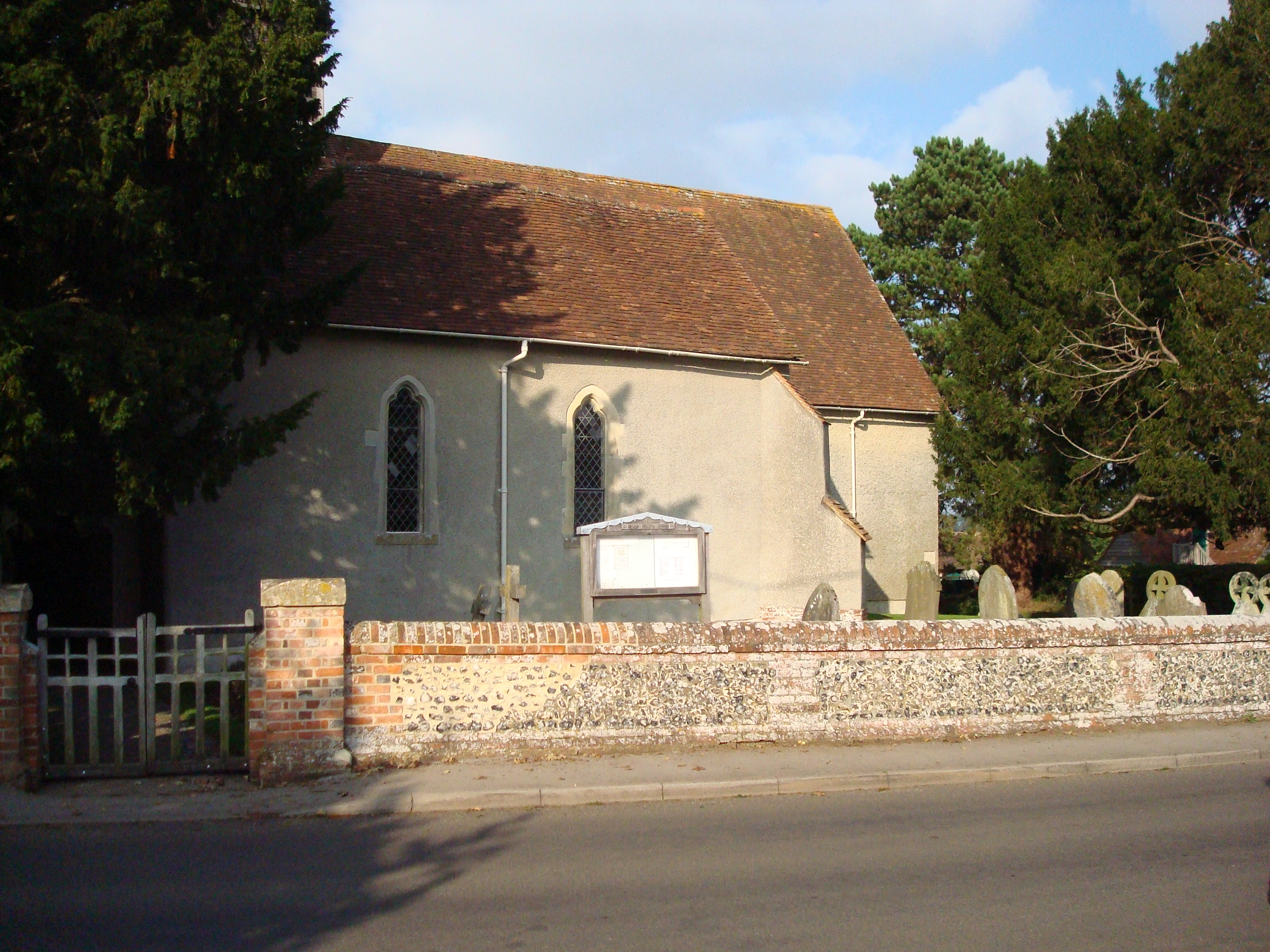
- All Saints Church, Long Sutton

- Location within Hampshire
- Population: 683 (2011 Census including Well)
- OS grid reference: SU7392447355
- Civil parish: Long Sutton
- District: Hart
- Shire county: Hampshire
- Region: South East
- Country: England
- Sovereign state: United Kingdom
- Post town: HOOK
- Postcode district: RG29
- Dialling code: 01256
- Police: Hampshire and Isle of Wight
- Fire: Hampshire and Isle of Wight
- Ambulance: South Central
- UK Parliament: North East Hampshire

Long Sutton is a small village and civil parish in the Hart district of Hampshire, England. The village lies about 3 miles (4.8 km) south of the town of Odiham. Neighbouring villages include Well, South Warnborough and Upton Grey.

The village includes picturesque brick and half-timbered cottages and a farmhouse dating from Tudor times. All Saints Church is the local church. Hydegate House was built in about 1561 by the Terry Family. In 1,200 acres (4.9 km^{2}) of farmland stands Lord Wandsworth College, a Neo-Georgian structure built in 1915, founded as a boarding school for boys who have lost a parent. The line of the "Harrow Way," one of the oldest roads in England, runs through the village.
