= Yateley =

Town and civil parish in Hampshire, England

Coordinates: 51°20′28″N 0°49′59″W

- Town and civil parish
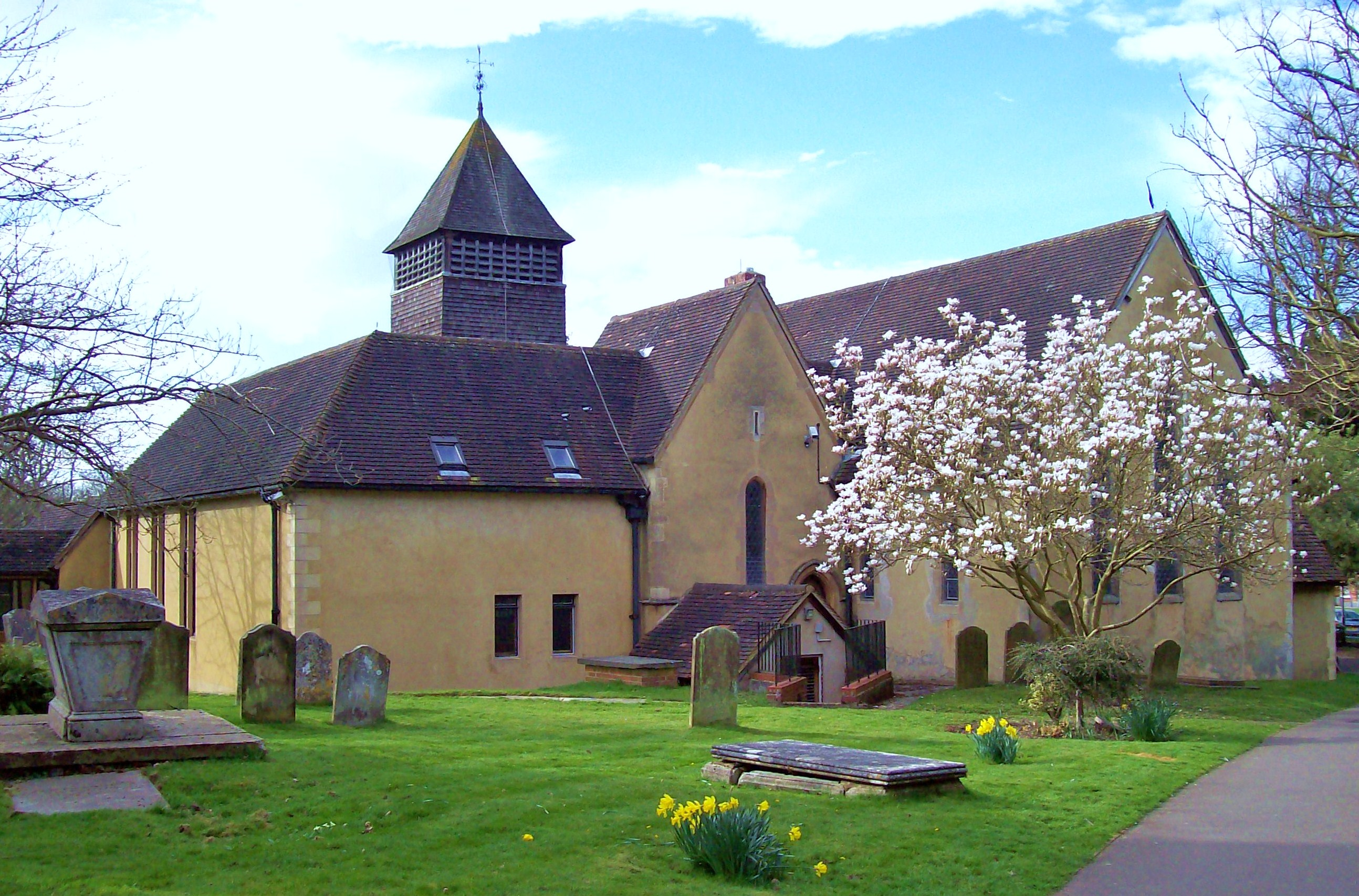
- St Peter's Church, Yateley

- Location within Hampshire
- Population: 20,334 (2021 Census)
- OS grid reference: SU8160
- Civil parish: Yateley
- District: Hart
- Shire county: Hampshire
- Region: South East
- Country: England
- Sovereign state: United Kingdom
- Post town: YATELEY
- Postcode district: GU46, GU17 (part)
- Dialling code: 01252 01276 (part)
- Police: Hampshire and Isle of Wight
- Fire: Hampshire and Isle of Wight
- Ambulance: South Central
- UK Parliament: Aldershot

Yateley (/ˈjeɪtli/) is a town and civil parish in the English county of Hampshire. It lies in the north-eastern corner of Hart District Council area, and is approximately 33 miles (53 km) southwest of Central London. It includes the settlements of Frogmore and Darby Green to the east. Yateley's population was 20,334 at the 2021 census.

Yateley Town Council is one of the few local councils recognised under the national 'Quality Council' award scheme.

In 2011, Hart district was named the UK's most desirable place to live, and Yateley was mentioned in a BBC News article as one of its towns. Yateley is known for hosting a family music festival every summer, Gig on the Green, and a beer and wine festival every autumn.

== History ==
The name Yateley derives from the Middle English 'Yate' meaning 'Gate' (into Windsor Forest) and 'Lea', a 'forest clearing'.

In historical records, spelling variations include Hyatele, Yateleghe, Yatche, Yatelighe, Yeatley, Yeateley and Yatelegh.

== Amenities ==
The parish church is St Peter's. It was badly damaged in a fire in 1979 and subsequently restored. Its outstanding feature is an early 16th-century wooden bell tower, housing a ring of eight bells. The tower survived the fire but the bells were cracked and had to be recast. The church is a Grade II listed building. The White Lion pub, in the centre of Yateley, is also Grade II listed.

== Transport ==
Yateley was never served by the railway network - the nearest station is Sandhurst, 1.5 mi (2.4 km) away. Sandhurst station is on the North Downs Line which runs from Reading to Guildford, Redhill and Gatwick Airport. The line is operated by Great Western Railway (GWR).

Stagecoach operates bus route 3 between Yateley and Aldershot every 30 minutes on Monday-Saturday, and every hour on Sundays. The route goes via Camberley, Frimley, Mytchett, and Ash Vale. They also run the bus route 8 between Yateley and Farnborough.

== Sport ==
Yateley United F.C. was formed in 2013, playing their home games at recently developed Sean Devereux Park. Yateley United's first team currently compete in Combined Counties League division one.

Yateley Cricket Club was established in 1881, playing originally at the Cricketers pub on Cricket Hill and then on The Green on Reading Road. In 1999, the club moved to a new purpose-built ground and clubhouse at Sean Devereux Park.

== Education ==
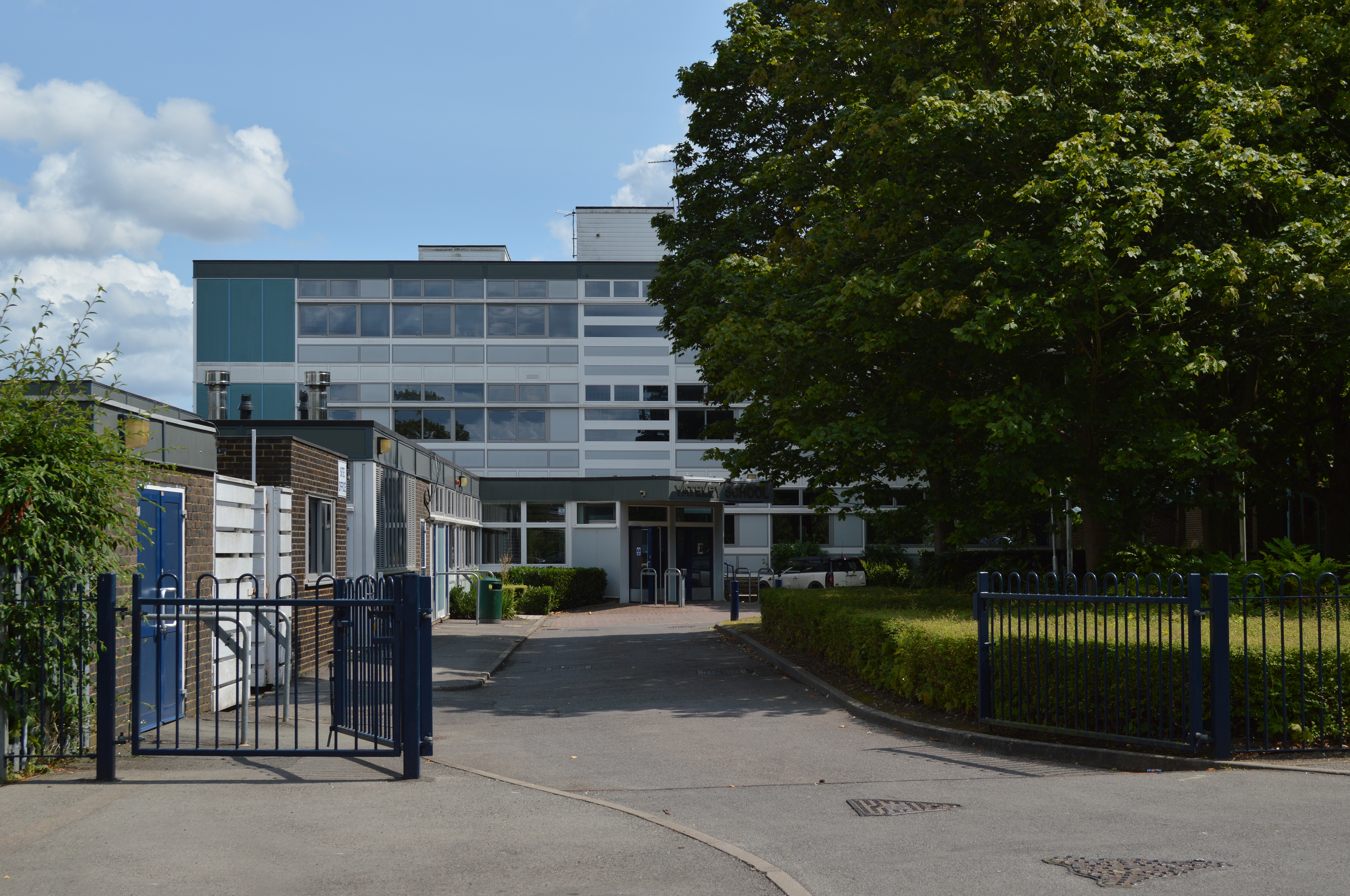
Yateley School

Following the closure and amalgamation of St Peter's Church of England Junior School and Yateley Infant School, a new primary school opened in September 2010, named Cranford Park C of E Primary School.

Yateley School is the largest secondary school in north-east Hampshire. It caters for children aged 11 to 16 and has an attached sixth-form college.

Frogmore Community College is another secondary school in Yateley.

Yateley Manor School is an independent school catering for around 240 pupils aged 3 to 16.

== Notable people ==
- Singer Alexa Goddard attended Yateley School.
- Flora Thompson, author of the trilogy of novels 'Lark Rise to Candleford' is recorded in the 1901 Census as living and working in the Yateley Post Office. These books have since been adapted for television by the BBC.
- Sonny Black a leading UK acoustic guitarist also lives in Yateley.
- Contemporary artist James Robert Ford grew up in Yateley and attended Yateley School. A number of his projects, including House Gymnastics, General Carbuncle, and 33 Things to do before you're 10, have taken place in Yateley.
- Chris Benham, a Hampshire cricketer, grew up in Yateley and attended Yateley School.
- Author Danny King grew up in Yateley and attended Yateley School.
- Sean Devereux, a charity worker in Somalia, came from Yateley. He was assassinated and Sean Devereux Park is named after him.
- David Copeland, known as the "London Nailbomber" after a 13-day bombing campaign in April 1999 aimed at London's black, Asian, and gay communities, grew up in Yateley, though residing in nearby Cove in Farnborough at the time of the attack.
- Robert Morgan, stop-motion animation filmmaker, grew up here.
- Jed Wallace, a professional footballer playing for Bristol City attended Frogmore Community College.
- Aaron Kuhl, a semi-professional former Reading footballer, lives in Yateley.
- Dom Ballard, a professional footballer for Leyton Orient and England Youth International, grew up here.
- Kerry Payne, a British Olympic synchronised swimmer, grew up in Yateley.
- Vex Red lead singer Terry Abbott, lived in Yateley as a child.
- 80s and 90s pop-rock band Breathe were from Yateley and attended Yateley School.
- Singing twins, Max and Harvey, went to school in Yateley.
