= Hawley, Hampshire =

Village and parish in Hampshire, England

Coordinates: 51.317°N 0.768°W

Hawley
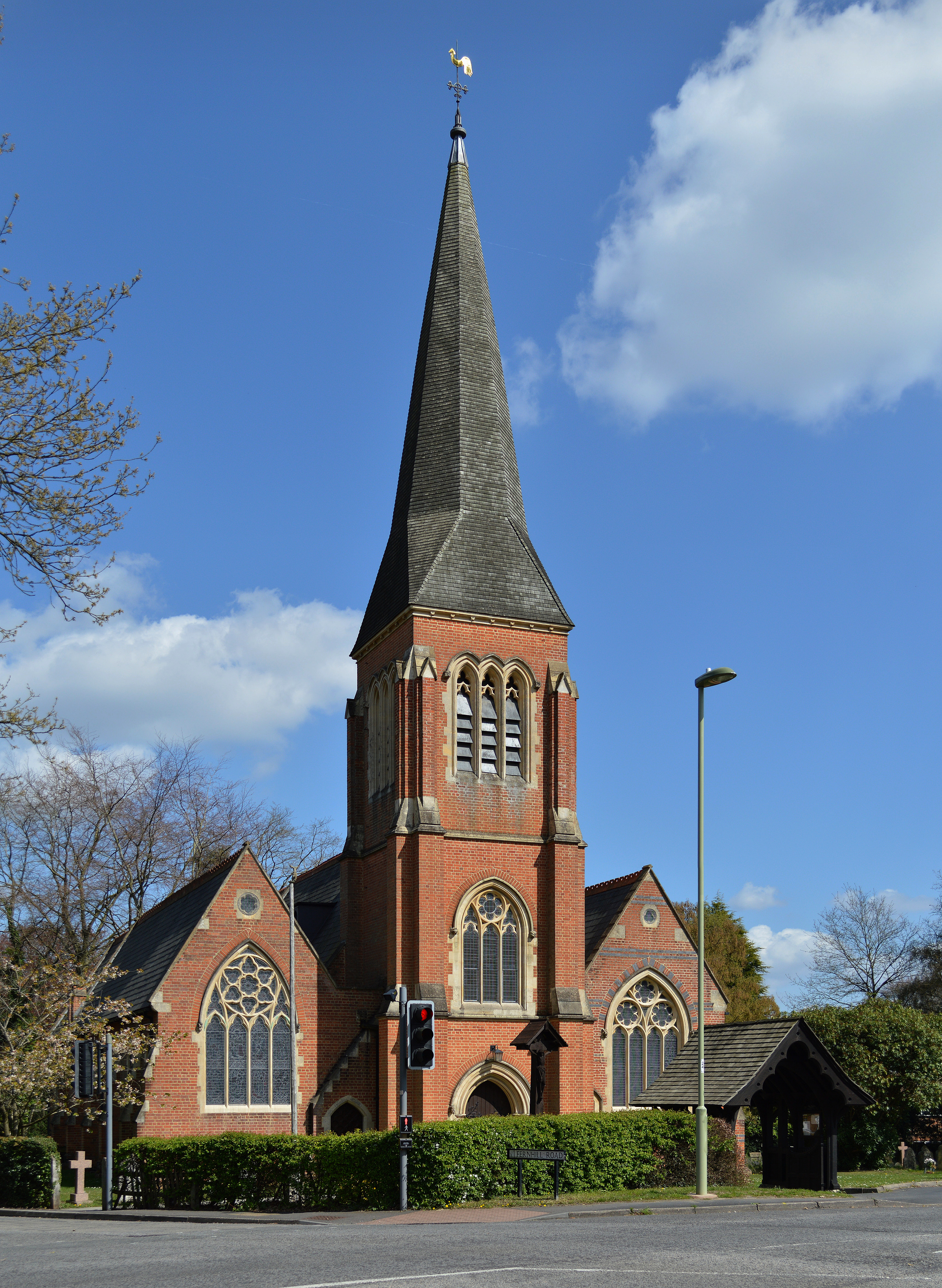
- Front elevation of Holy Trinity Church, Hawley

- Location within Hampshire
- OS grid reference: SU8559
  - London: 33 miles (53 km)
- Civil parish: Blackwater and Hawley
- District: Hart
- Shire county: Hampshire
- Region: South East
- Country: England
- Sovereign state: United Kingdom
- Post town: Camberley
- Postcode district: GU17
- Dialling code: 01252 or 01276
- Police: Hampshire and Isle of Wight
- Fire: Hampshire and Isle of Wight
- Ambulance: South Central
- UK Parliament: Aldershot
- Website: Blackwater and Hawley Town Council

Hawley is a small village in the civil parish of Blackwater and Hawley, in the Hart district of northeastern Hampshire, England.

The village is contiguous with the small town of Blackwater. It is on the western edge of the Blackwater Valley conurbation, about 3 miles (5 km) northwest of central Farnborough, Hampshire, about 2 miles (3 km) west of Camberley, Surrey and about 33 miles (53 km) west-southwest of London. Hawley is directly north of Cove, a large, suburb of Farnborough, with a relatively long history.

== History ==
The first written record of Hawley is from 1248, in the Compotus De Crundal, spelt as Halely, Halle and Hallee and later in 1280 as Hallegh. And spelt as Hallie and Halley in Documents relating to the Foundation of the Chapter of Winchester AD 1541–1547, published by Hampshire Record Society in 1888. The name is likely in true Old or Medieval English Healhleah or Healhaleah meaning nook clearing or nook meadow. Historical spellings also include Hawleye, Halle and Hallie.

The tithings of Yateley and Hawley were, as before, listed as parcels of the manor and the hundred of Crondall in 1567. The parish of Hawley was created out of that of Yateley in 1838, a few decades before the secular aspects of such were fully ceased as civil parishes were rolled out.

== Parish church ==
The Church of England parish church of Holy Trinity in what is often, being a relatively modern full place name, considered 'Blackwater'. built in 1837 J.B. Clacy of Reading enlarged the church in 1857. Charles Buckeridge expanded it further in 1863, adding the chancel arch, chancel rib-vaulting and apse. The tower and spire were added in 1882. The building is in a Gothic Revival style of about AD 1300 and is listed Grade II (listing 26 June 1987).

The parish's second church, All Saints', South Hawley is where Chapel Lane meets Fernhill Road.

The church parish contains all of any zone traditionally or normally considered Blackwater, see map at Diocese of Guildford.

== Amenities ==
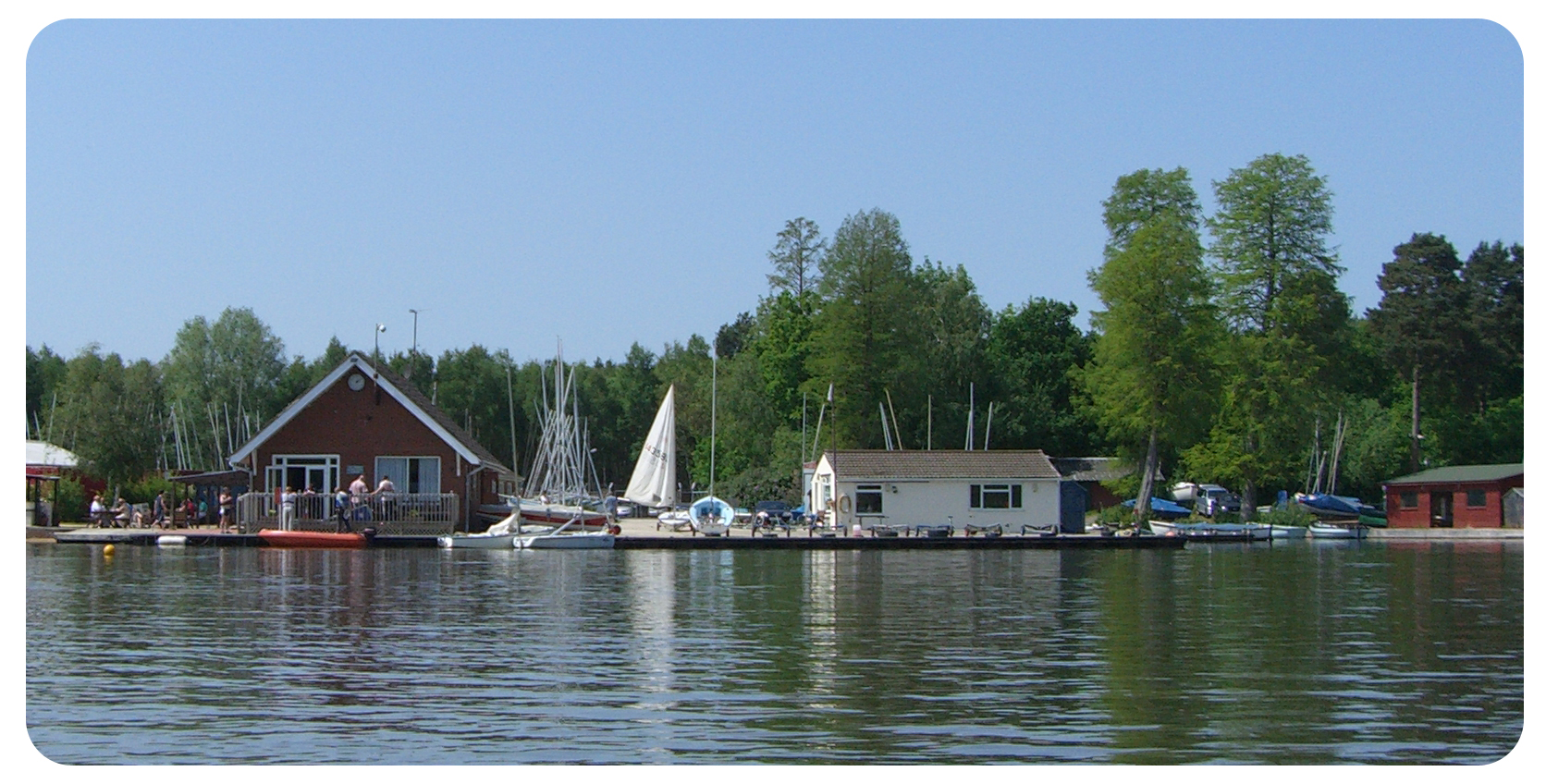
Hawley Lake Sail Training Centre – Clubhouse and Facilities on the western shore of Hawley Lake

Hawley has a village hall, village green, equestrian centre, private leisure centre, a cricket ground and a playground area.

Hawley has Hawley Primary School teaches boys and girls to Key Stages 1 and 2.

HawleyHurst School merging into Hurst Lodge School (until then in Ascot) folded in 2020 – an independent mixed, nursery, preparatory and senior school. Alumni include Sarah Ferguson. The Department for Education (DfE) issued a notice to improve on 20 July 2018. The DfE removed the regulatory action on 11 November 2019. It had a £600,000 annual cash shortfall. Latterly it had 282 pupils, from a capacity of 450.

Centred 1.5 miles (2 km) southwest is Hawley Lake (via a forest walk about 20 minutes from Hawley Green), which is used by the British Army for basic sailing training and also has a private sailing club & watersports facility (Hawley Lake Sail Training Centre). The lake is used for dinghy sailing, kayaking, windsurfing and wakeboarding/water-skiing. There is also a beach on its southern shore which is used by local residents. Each Guy Fawkes Night the Army organises a firework display on the lake's islets, attracting thousands of visitors from many miles around.

== Film location ==
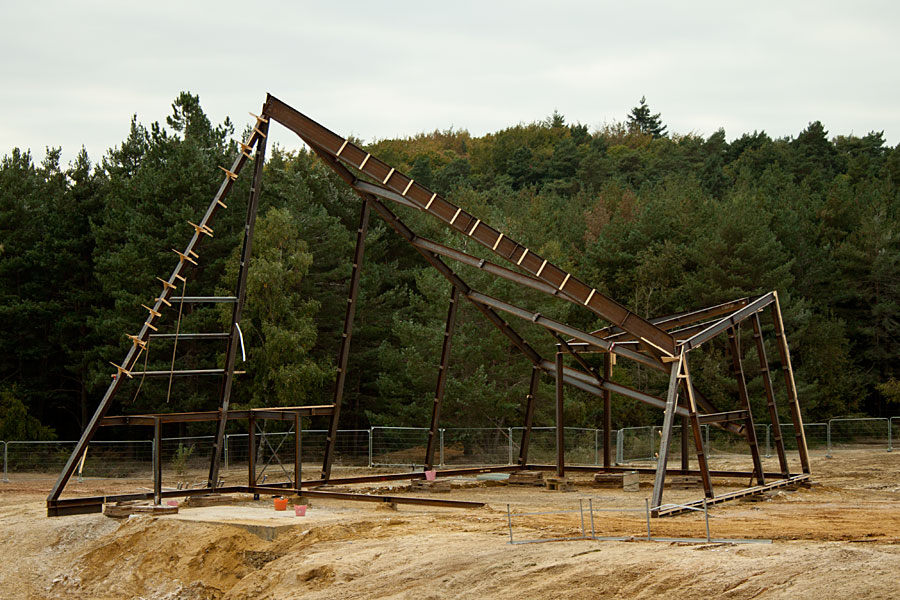
The steel structure of the cable car station in Johnny English Reborn.

Hawley Lake and the surrounding woodland is often used as a feature film location, including part of the opening sequence of the 2002 film Die Another Day in which James Bond is in North Korea. It also used for the obstacle course and lake scenes in Spies Like Us, starring Chevy Chase, the 2005 film Sahara and scenes from the second Johnny English film Johnny English Reborn, notably the cable car station. The BBC filmed episodes of It Ain't Half Hot Mum at the lake in the 1970s. In April 2014, the woodland to the east and south of the disused airstrip was used as a filming location for the 2015 superhero movie Avengers: Age of Ultron. Throughout early 2017, sets were built for Jurassic World: Fallen Kingdom in the woodland.

== Sources ==
- Brodie, Antonia; Felstead, Alison; Franklin, Jonathan; Pinfield, Leslie; Oldfield, Jane, eds. (2001). Directory of British Architects 1834–1914, A–K. London & New York: Continuum. p. 375. ISBN 0-8264-5513-1.
- Pevsner, Nikolaus; Lloyd, David (1967). Hampshire and the Isle of Wight. The Buildings of England. Harmondsworth: Penguin Books. pp. 280–281.
