= Hart District =

Coordinates: 51.2794°N 0.8461°W

Hart
- Non-metropolitan district
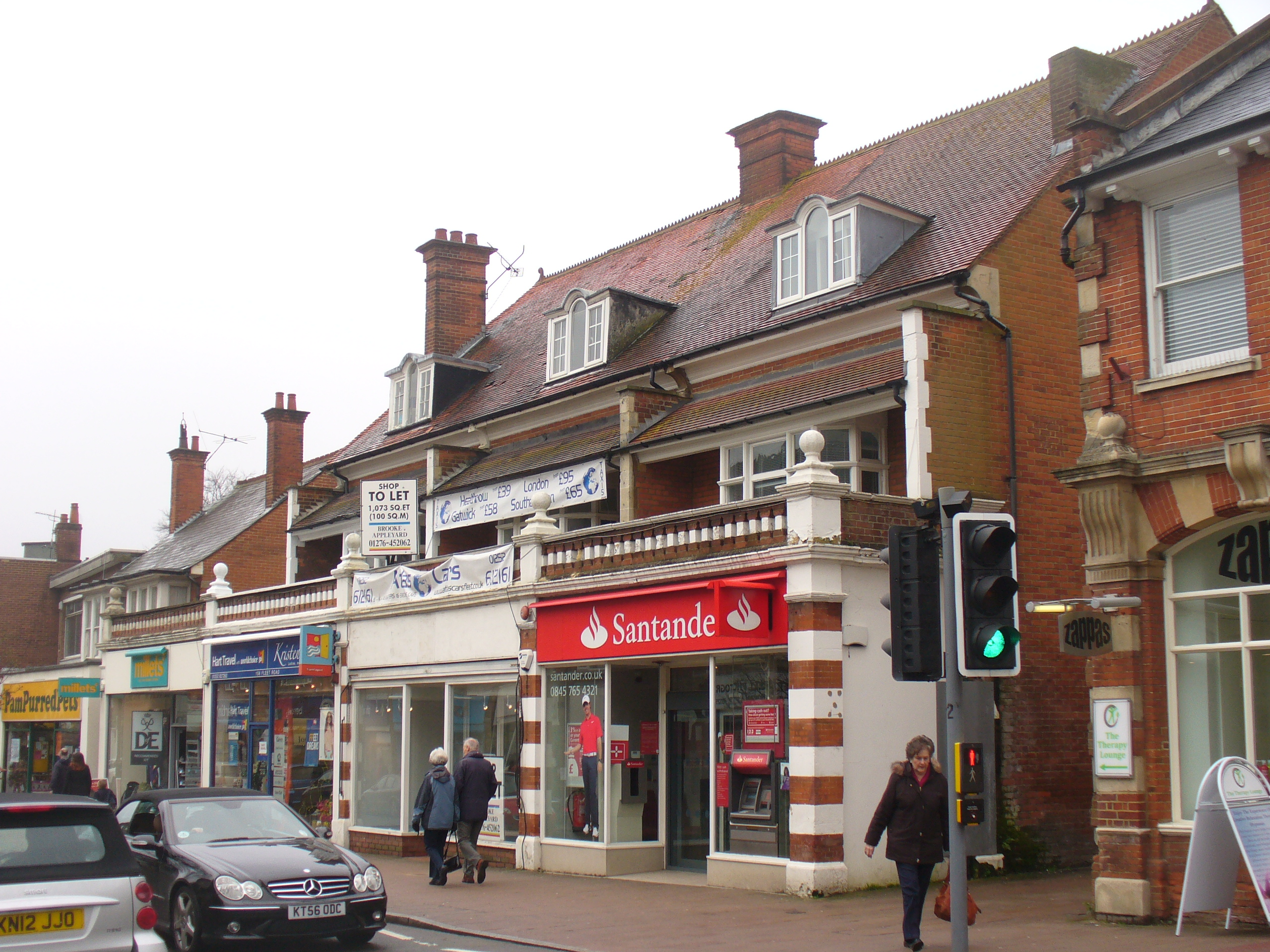
- Fleet town centre

- Hart shown within Hampshire
- Sovereign state: United Kingdom
- Constituent country: England
- Region: South East England
- Non-metropolitan county: Hampshire
- Status: Non-metropolitan district
- Admin HQ: Fleet
- Incorporated: 1 April 1974

Government
  - Type: Non-metropolitan district council
  - Body: Hart District Council
  - MPs: Alex Brewer; Alex Baker

Area
  - Total: 83.1 sq mi (215.3 km^{2})
  - Rank: 140th (of 296)

Population (2024)
  - Total: 103,162
  - Rank: 242nd (of 296)
  - Density: 1,241/sq mi (479.2/km^{2})

Ethnicity (2021)
  - Ethnic groups: List: 92.5% White; 3.6% Asian; 2.2% Mixed; 0.8% Black; 0.8% other

Religion (2021)
  - Religion: List: 49.8% Christianity; 41.1% no religion; 5.6% not stated; 1.2% Hinduism; 0.8% Islam; 0.6% Buddhism; 0.4% other; 0.3% Sikhism; 0.1% Judaism
- Time zone: UTC0 (GMT)
  - Summer (DST): UTC+1 (BST)
- ONS code: 24UG (ONS); E07000089 (GSS)
- OS grid reference: SU8047254050

Hart is a local government district in Hampshire, England, named after the River Hart. Its council is based in Fleet. The district also contains the towns of Blackwater and Yateley, along with numerous villages and surrounding rural areas.

In the English indices of deprivation for 2019, Hart was ranked as the least deprived district in England; a position it had also held in the 2015 index.

For five years running (2011–2015), an annual study conducted by the Halifax bank named Hart as the UK's most desirable place to live for quality of life. The study took into account jobs, housing, health, crime, weather, traffic and broadband access. It found that in 2014, 97% of people in the local authority area were in good health; and in 2011, tended to have incomes 40% above the national average.

== History ==
The district was created on 1 April 1974 under the Local Government Act 1972, covering the area of two former districts, which were both abolished at the same time:

- Hartley Wintney Rural District
- Fleet Urban District

The new district was initially going to be named Hartley Wintney, after the rural district which covered most of the area, which in turn was named after the village of the same name. The shadow authority elected to oversee the transition to the new system requested a change of name to Hart, after the River Hart which runs through the area. The change of name was approved by the government on 17 January 1974, before the new district formally came into being.

The River Hart is said to derive its name from the number of deer in the area, with a hart being an old term for an adult male deer, synonymous with "stag". The area historically had several deer parks. Hart District Council uses a profile of a stag as its logo.

In March 2026, the government announced that it would abolish the district in 2028 as part of local government reform across Hampshire. These proposals were withdrawn in September 2026.

== Governance ==
Hart District Council

Type
- Type: Non-metropolitan district

Leadership
- Chair: Stuart Bailey, Liberal Democrat since 21 May 2026
- Leader: David Neighbour, Liberal Democrat since 25 May 2017
- Chief Executive: Daryl Phillips

Structure
- Seats: 33 councillors
- Political groups: Administration (24) Liberal Democrats (13) CCH (11) Other parties (9) Conservative (8) Independent (1)

Elections
- Last election: 7 May 2026

Meeting place
- Civic Offices, Harlington Way, Fleet, GU51 4AE

Website
- www.hart.gov.uk

Hart District Council provides district-level services. County-level services are provided by Hampshire County Council. The whole district is also covered by civil parishes, which form a third tier of local government.

=== Political control ===
The council has been under no overall control since 2012. Since 2017 the council has been run by a coalition of the Liberal Democrats and local party Community Campaign (Hart), led by Liberal Democrat councillor David Neighbour.

The first election to the council was held in 1973, initially acting as a shadow authority alongside the outgoing authorities until the new arrangements took effect on 1 April 1974. Political control since 1974 has been as follows:

Party in control	Years
Independent	1974–1979
Conservative	1979–1983
No overall control	1983–2000
Conservative	2000–2005
No overall control	2005–2010
Conservative	2010–2012
No overall control	2012–present

=== Leadership ===
The leaders of the council since 2008 have been:

Councillor	Party	From	To
Ken Crookes	Conservative	2008	28 Nov 2014
Stephen Parker	Conservative	18 Dec 2014	May 2017
David Neighbour	Liberal Democrats	25 May 2017	

=== Composition ===
Following the 2026 election, the composition of the council is:

Party	Councillors
Liberal Democrats	13
Community Campaign	11
Conservative	8
Independent	1
Total	33

No party has majority control of the council; currently the Liberal Democrats and Community Campaign (Hart), a local residents' association, run the council as a joint administration.

=== Elections ===
Since the last boundary changes in 2014 the council has comprised 33 councillors representing 11 wards, with each ward electing three councillors. Elections are held three years out of every four, with a third of the council (one councillor for each ward) elected at a time for a four year term of office. Hampshire County Council elections are held in the fourth year of the cycle when there are no district council elections.

=== Premises ===
The council is based at the Civic Offices on Harlington Way in Fleet. The building was purpose-built for the council in 1986.

== Demography ==
In mid-2003 Hart had an estimated 85,700 residents. This compares with the 2001 Census figure of 83,505 residents. The 2001 Census also reported that there were 32,470 households, with 77% of residents describing their health as 'good'. In the twenty years between 1982 and 2002 the population of Hart grew by 19 per cent, compared with an increase of 11 per cent for the South East region as a whole.

== Parishes and town councils ==
The whole district is divided into civil parishes, listed below. The parish councils for Blackwater and Hawley, Fleet, and Yateley have declared their parishes to be towns, allowing them to take the style "town council". Whilst Hook is a post town it retains a parish council rather than a town council.

- Blackwater and Hawley
- Bramshill
- Church Crookham
- Crondall
- Crookham Village
- Dogmersfield
- Elvetham Heath
- Eversley
- Ewshot
- Fleet
- Greywell
- Hartley Wintney
- Heckfield
- Hook
- Long Sutton
- Mattingley
- Odiham
- Rotherwick
- South Warnborough
- Winchfield
- Yateley
