= Hart District Council elections =

Local government elections in Hampshire, England

Map of the electoral wards of Hart from the 2014 election

One third of Hart District Council in Hampshire, England is elected each year, followed by one year without election. Since the last boundary changes in 2014, 33 councillors have been elected from 11 wards.

== Council elections ==
- 1973 Hartley Wintney District Council election
- 1976 Hart District Council election (New ward boundaries)
- 1979 Hart District Council election
- 1980 Hart District Council election
- 1982 Hart District Council election
- 1983 Hart District Council election
- 1984 Hart District Council election
- 1986 Hart District Council election
- 1987 Hart District Council election
- 1988 Hart District Council election
- 1990 Hart District Council election (District boundary changes took place but the number of seats remained the same)
- 1991 Hart District Council election (District boundary changes took place but the number of seats remained the same)
- 1992 Hart District Council election (District boundary changes took place but the number of seats remained the same)
- 1994 Hart District Council election
- 1995 Hart District Council election
- 1996 Hart District Council election
- 1998 Hart District Council election
- 1999 Hart District Council election
- 2000 Hart District Council election
- 2002 Hart District Council election (New ward boundaries)
- 2003 Hart District Council election
- 2004 Hart District Council election
- 2006 Hart District Council election
- 2007 Hart District Council election
- 2008 Hart District Council election
- 2010 Hart District Council election
- 2011 Hart District Council election
- 2012 Hart District Council election
- 2014 Hart District Council election (New ward boundaries)
- 2015 Hart District Council election
- 2016 Hart District Council election
- 2018 Hart District Council election
- 2019 Hart District Council election
- 2021 Hart District Council election
- 2022 Hart District Council election
- 2023 Hart District Council election
- 2024 Hart District Council election
- 2026 Hart District Council election

== District results maps ==
2002 results map

2003 results map

2004 results map

2006 results map

2007 results map

2008 results map

2010 results map

2011 results map

2012 results map

2014 results map (new ward boundaries)

2015 results map

2016 results map

2018 results map

2019 results map

2021 results map

2022 results map

2023 results map

2024 results map

2026 results map

== By-election results ==
=== 1996-1998 ===
Fleet Pondtail By-Election 12 June 1997
Party	Candidate	Votes	%	±%
Conservative		773	48.1	+32.6
Independent		691	43.0	−25.7
Liberal Democrats		144	9.0	−2.0
Majority		82	5.1	
Turnout		1,608		
Conservative gain from Independent		Swing		

=== 1998-2002 ===
Blackwater and Hawley By-Election 25 November 1999
Party	Candidate	Votes	%	±%
Liberal Democrats	Mark Stokes	472	58.7	+4.8
Conservative	Richard Hunt	332	41.3	−4.8
Majority		140	17.4	
Turnout		804	19.0	
Liberal Democrats hold		Swing		

=== 2002-2006 ===
Fleet Pondtail By-Election 11 December 2003
Party	Candidate	Votes	%	±%
Liberal Democrats	Sue Fisher	605	57.2	+22.9
Conservative	Lucy Ellis	341	32.3	−15.6
Independent	Stephen Cantle	93	8.8	+8.8
Green	Lars Mosesson	18	1.7	+1.7
Majority		264	25.0	
Turnout		1,057	28.2	
Liberal Democrats gain from Independent		Swing		

Church Crookham West By-Election 5 May 2005
Party	Candidate	Votes	%	±%
Community Campaign (Hart)	Simon Ambler	1,698	69.1	−13.8
Conservative	Deborah Moss	760	30.9	+13.8
Majority		938	38.2	
Turnout		2,458	66.3	
CCH hold		Swing		

Hartley Wintney By-Election 5 May 2005
Party	Candidate	Votes	%	±%
Conservative	Sara-Lea Kinnell	1,358	56.1	−19.6
Liberal Democrats	Peter White	1,061	43.9	+19.6
Majority		297	12.3	
Turnout		2,419	65.3	
Conservative hold		Swing		

Odiham By-Election 5 May 2005
Party	Candidate	Votes	%	±%
Conservative	Kenneth Crookes	1,530	62.9	−7.9
Liberal Democrats	Christopher Griffin	901	37.1	+12.9
Majority		629	25.9	
Turnout		2,431	70.8	
Conservative hold		Swing		

=== 2006-2010 ===
Eversley By-Election 4 June 2009
Party	Candidate	Votes	%	±%
Conservative	Janet Maughan	488	55.7	
Independent	Philip Todd	362	41.3	
BNP	Geoffrey Crompton	26	3.0	
Majority		126	14.4	
Turnout		876	44.1	
Conservative hold		Swing		

=== 2022-2016 ===
Yateley West By-Election 8 October 2025
Party	Candidate	Votes	%	±%
Liberal Democrats	Alex Drage	1,101	54.7	−20.5
Reform	Clive Lawrance	562	27.9	+27.9
Conservative	Sandra Miller	348	17.3	−7.5
Majority		539	26.8	
Turnout		2,011	44.1	
Liberal Democrats hold		Swing		
