= 2023 Hart District Council election =

Election

| ← 2022 | 4 May 2023 | 2024 → |

11 out of 33 seats to Hart District Council 17 seats needed for a majority

| | First party | Second party |
|---|---|---|
| Leader | David Neighbour | Anne Crampton |
| Party | Liberal Democrats | Conservative |
| Last election | 11 seats, 31.2% | 11 seats, 40.7% |
| Seats before | 11 | 11 |
| Seats after | 11 | 11 |
| | Third party | Fourth party |
| Leader | James Radley |
| Party | CCH | Independent |
| Last election | 10 seats, 20.4% | N/A |
| Seats before | 10 | 1 |
| Seats after | 10 | 1 |
- Map of the results
Leader before election
David Neighbour
Liberal Democrat
No overall control
Leader after election
David Neighbour
Liberal Democrat
No overall control

The 2023 Hart District Council election took place on 4 May 2023 to elect members of Hart District Council in Hampshire, England. This was on the same day as other local elections across England.

== Summary ==
The council was under no overall control prior to the election, being run by a coalition of the Liberal Democrats and local party Community Campaign (Hart) (CCH), with Liberal Democrat David Neighbour serving as leader of the council. No seats changed party at this election and the same coalition continued to run the council after the election.

=== Election result ===
2023 Hart District Council
| Party | This election | | | Full council | | | This election | | |
| Party | Seats | Net | Seats % | Other | Total | Total % | Votes | Votes % | +/− |
|---|---|---|---|---|---|---|---|---|---|
| Liberal Democrats | 4 | Steady | 36.4 | 7 | 11 | 33.3 | 6,301 | 24.0 | ▼7.2 |
| Conservative | 2 | Steady | 18.2 | 9 | 11 | 33.3 | 9,965 | 37.9 | ▼2.8 |
| CCH | 4 | Steady | 36.4 | 6 | 10 | 30.3 | 4,595 | 17.5 | ▼2.9 |
| Independent | 1 | Steady | 9.1 | 0 | 1 | 3.0 | 1,841 | 7.0 | New |
| Labour | 0 | Steady | 0.0 | 0 | 0 | 0.0 | 2,484 | 9.4 | ▲4.3 |
| Green | 0 | Steady | 0.0 | 0 | 0 | 0.0 | 914 | 3.5 | ▲1.5 |
| Reform UK | 0 | Steady | 0.0 | 0 | 0 | 0.0 | 94 | 0.4 | New |
| Heritage | 0 | Steady | 0.0 | 0 | 0 | 0.0 | 78 | 0.3 | ▲0.1 |

== Ward results ==
The Statement of Persons Nominated, which details the candidates standing in each ward, was released by Hart District Council following the close of nominations on 5 April 2023. The results for each ward were as follows:

=== Blackwater & Hawley ===
Blackwater & Hawley
| Party | Candidate | Votes | % | ±% |
|---|---|---|---|---|
| Liberal Democrats | Bob Harward* | 1,188 | 63.4 | −7.9 |
| Conservative | John Burton | 487 | 26.0 | −2.7 |
| Labour | Carly Bidwell | 200 | 10.7 | N/A |
| Majority | | | | |
| Turnout | | | 30.40 | |
| Liberal Democrats hold | | Swing | | |

=== Crookham East ===
Crookham East
| Party | Candidate | Votes | % | ±% |
|---|---|---|---|---|
| CCH | Chris Axam* | 1,261 | 55.4 | −10.8 |
| Conservative | Annette Whibley | 796 | 35.0 | +1.2 |
| Labour | Chas Spradbery | 219 | 9.6 | N/A |
| Majority | | | | |
| Turnout | | | 38.87 | |
| CCH hold | | Swing | | |

=== Crookham West & Ewshot ===
Crookham West & Ewshot
| Party | Candidate | Votes | % | ±% |
|---|---|---|---|---|
| CCH | Tony Clarke* | 1,147 | 44.8 | −17.0 |
| Conservative | Bruce Bulgin | 906 | 35.4 | −2.8 |
| Green | Joseph Hutton | 280 | 10.9 | N/A |
| Labour | Lila Seling Mabo | 227 | 8.9 | N/A |
| Majority | | | | |
| Turnout | | | 32.44 | |
| CCH hold | | Swing | | |

=== Fleet Central ===
Fleet Central
| Party | Candidate | Votes | % | ±% |
|---|---|---|---|---|
| CCH | Katie Davies* | 1,116 | 44.3 | −0.7 |
| Conservative | Roy Fang | 950 | 37.7 | −1.3 |
| Labour | Andrew Perkins | 377 | 14.9 | +2.7 |
| Monster Raving Loony | Howling Laud Hope | 79 | 3.1 | −0.8 |
| Majority | | | | |
| Turnout | | | 38.22 | |
| CCH hold | | Swing | | |

=== Fleet East ===
Fleet East
| Party | Candidate | Votes | % | ±% |
|---|---|---|---|---|
| Liberal Democrats | Peter Wildsmith* | 1,402 | 53.7 | +6.6 |
| Conservative | Mike Thorne | 863 | 33.0 | −5.5 |
| Green | Samantha Davis | 195 | 7.5 | −0.7 |
| Labour | Valmai Wainhouse | 152 | 5.8 | −0.4 |
| Majority | | | | |
| Turnout | | | 42.98 | |
| Liberal Democrats hold | | Swing | | |

=== Fleet West ===
Fleet West
| Party | Candidate | Votes | % | ±% |
|---|---|---|---|---|
| CCH | Ben Thomas | 1,071 | 42.7 | −4.0 |
| Conservative | Mohua Chakraborty | 979 | 39.1 | −1.3 |
| Labour | Mike Mellor | 259 | 10.3 | N/A |
| Green | Wayne Rozier | 197 | 7.9 | −4.9 |
| Majority | | | | |
| Turnout | | | 36.77 | |
| CCH hold | | Swing | | |

=== Hartley Wintney ===
Hartley Wintney
| Party | Candidate | Votes | % | ±% |
|---|---|---|---|---|
| Conservative | Spencer Farmer* | 1,364 | 54.6 | −10.8 |
| Independent | Roger Robertson | 569 | 22.8 | N/A |
| Liberal Democrats | Daisy Khepar | 566 | 22.6 | +0.4 |
| Majority | | | | |
| Turnout | | | 34.36 | |
| Conservative hold | | Swing | | |

=== Hook ===
Hook
| Party | Candidate | Votes | % | ±% |
|---|---|---|---|---|
| Independent | Dermot Smith* | 1,272 | 46.1 | N/A |
| Conservative | Jen Copeland | 1,045 | 37.9 | −9.2 |
| Labour | Amanda Affleck-Cruise | 443 | 16.1 | +3.7 |
| Majority | | | | |
| Turnout | | | 37.22 | |
| Independent hold | | Swing | | |

=== Odiham ===
Odiham
| Party | Candidate | Votes | % | ±% |
|---|---|---|---|---|
| Conservative | Chris Dorn* | 1,412 | 61.8 | +2.5 |
| Liberal Democrats | Tony Over | 446 | 19.5 | −21.2 |
| Green | Lars Mosesson | 242 | 10.6 | N/A |
| Labour | Ben Jones | 185 | 8.1 | N/A |
| Majority | | | | |
| Turnout | | | 34.98 | |
| Conservative hold | | Swing | | |

=== Yateley East ===
Yateley East
| Party | Candidate | Votes | % | ±% |
|---|---|---|---|---|
| Liberal Democrats | David Neighbour* | 1,325 | 60.5 | −12.8 |
| Conservative | Chris Barnes | 585 | 26.7 | ±0.0 |
| Labour | Mark Schroeder | 185 | 8.5 | N/A |
| Reform UK | Trevor Lloyd-Jones | 94 | 4.3 | N/A |
| Majority | | | | |
| Turnout | | | 32.80 | |
| Liberal Democrats hold | | Swing | | |

=== Yateley West ===
Yateley West
| Party | Candidate | Votes | % | ±% |
|---|---|---|---|---|
| Liberal Democrats | Mark Vernon | 1,374 | 60.6 | −1.2 |
| Conservative | Richard Martin | 578 | 25.5 | −0.7 |
| Labour | Joyce Still | 237 | 10.5 | +0.6 |
| Heritage | Frances Crompton | 78 | 3.4 | +1.2 |
| Majority | | | | |
| Turnout | | | 34.21 | |
| Liberal Democrats hold | | Swing | | |
