= 2015 Hart District Council election =

2015 UK local government election

2015 Hart District Council Election
← 2014	7 May 2015	2016 →

32 seats to Hart District Council 17 seats needed for a majority
	First party	Second party	Third party
Party	Conservative	Liberal Democrats	CCH
Seats before	14	9	9
Seats won	8	2	2
Seats after	16	8	8
Seat change	+2	-1	-1
- Results map
Council control before election
No overall control
Council control after election
No overall control

The 2015 Hart District Council election took place on 7 May 2015 to elect members of the Hart District Council in England. It was held on the same day as other local elections. Prior to this elections, the Conservatives held a plurality with 14 seats but did not hold a majority, whilst the Liberal Democrats and Community Campaign (Hart) both had 8 seats. The remaining seat was held by an independent.

== Results summary ==
These were the second elections to be held with the new boundaries after the 2014 elections, which saw the Conservatives elected the largest party but without a majority, while Community Campaign (Hart) and the Liberal Democrats won nine seats each alongside won independent candidate. As such, the council remained under no overall control.

n the 2015 election, the Conservatives were the only party to make gains, winning two new seats, one each from the Liberal Democrats and Community Campaign Hart, with no other changes. The council remained under no overall control. As well as the three party groups on the council, one independent from Hook Ward remained but was not up for election until 2018.

The table below only tallies the votes of the highest polling candidate for each party within each ward. This is known as the top candidate method and is often used for multi-member plurality elections. Most wards only had one seat up for election, but several had two.

Hart District Council election, 2015
Party	Seats	Gains	Losses	Net gain/loss	Seats %	Votes %	Votes	+/−
Conservative	16	2	0	▲2	48.48	50.87	25,450	
Liberal Democrats	8	0	1	▼1	24.24	17.50	8,757	
CCH	8	0	1	▼1	24.24	14.19	7,104	
UKIP	0	0	0	Steady		10.51	5,260	
Labour	0	0	0	Steady		6.67	3,340	
Green	0	0	0	Steady		0.23	118	

== Ward results ==
=== Blackwater & Hawley ===
Blackwater & Hawley Ward
Party	Candidate	Votes	%	±%
Liberal Democrats	Bob Harward	1630		
Conservative	Vivienne Gascoigne	1242		
UKIP	Mike Gascoigne	581		
Labour Co-op	Les Lawrie	298		
Green	Steve Francis (Note: "No description requested, but standing for Green Party)	118		
Majority				
Liberal Democrats hold		Swing		

=== Crookham East ===
Crookham East Ward
Party	Candidate	Votes	%	±%
CCH	Chris Axam	1870		
Conservative	Helen Butler	1834		
UKIP	Dawn Moors	387		
Labour	Ruth Ann Williams	379		
Majority				
CCH hold		Swing		

=== Crookham West and Ewshot ===
Crookham West and Ewshot Ward
Party	Candidate	Votes	%	±%
CCH	Tony Clarke	2027		
Conservative	Christopher James Simmons	2003		
UKIP	David Franklin Owens	384		
Labour	Dominic Arthur	359		
Majority				
CCH hold		Swing		

=== Fleet Central ===
Fleet Central Ward
Party	Candidate	Votes	%	±%
Conservative	Alex Gray	2038		
CCH	John Bennison	1716		
Labour	Satdeep Kaur Grewel	468		
UKIP	Robert Blay	364		−5.5
Monster Raving Loony	Howling Laud Hope	88		
Majority				
Conservative gain from CCH		Swing		

=== Fleet East ===
Fleet East Ward
Party	Candidate	Votes	%	±%
Conservative	Stephen Parker	2678		
Liberal Democrats	Neil Christopher Walton	774		
Labour	John Gawthorpe	539		
UKIP	Peter Devonshire	407		
Majority				
Conservative hold		Swing		

=== Fleet West ===
Fleet West Ward
Party	Candidate	Votes	%	±%
Conservative	Sara Kinnell	2686		
CCH	Stephen Cantle	952		
Labour	James Hurst	338		
Liberal Democrats	Paul Einchcomb	336		
UKIP	Gordon Smith	280		
Majority				
Conservative hold		Swing		

=== Hartley Witney ===
Hartney Witney Ward
Party	Candidate	Votes	%	±%
Conservative	Andrew James Renshaw	2941		
Conservative	Anne Crampton	952		
Liberal Democrats	Tony Over	1128		
Liberal Democrats	Alan Woolford	1090		
UKIP	Ali Altay	569		
Majority				
Conservative hold		Swing		
Conservative hold		Swing		

=== Hook ===
Hook Ward
Party	Candidate	Votes	%	±%
Conservative	Brian Burchfield	3001		
Labour	Verd Nabbs	647		
UKIP	Ruth Hamilton	514		
Liberal Democrats	Jeffrey Smith	486		
Majority				
Conservative hold		Swing		

=== Odiham ===
Odiham Ward
Party	Candidate	Votes	%	±%
Conservative	Stephen Gorys	3198		
Liberal Democrats	Rosalyn Gordon	816		
UKIP	Kevin Oliver	618		
Majority				
Conservative hold		Swing		

=== Yateley East ===
Yateley East Ward
Party	Candidate	Votes	%	±%
Liberal Democrats	Dave Neighbour	1828		
Conservative	John Burton	1827		
UKIP	Sue Perkins	600		
Labour	Joyce Still	441		
Majority				
Liberal Democrats hold		Swing		

=== Yateley West ===
Yateley West Ward
Party	Candidate	Votes	%	±%
Conservative	Andrew Dickens	2002		
Liberal Democrats	Claire Elhaggagi	1759		
UKIP	John Howe	556		
Labour	Alistair Sutherland	410		−5.5
Majority				
Conservative gain from Liberal Democrats		Swing		
