= 2018 Hart District Council election =

2018 UK local government election

2018 Hart District Council Election
← 2016	3 May 2018	2019 →

11 seats to Hart District Council 17 seats needed for a majority
	First party	Second party	Third party
Party	Conservative	CCH	Liberal Democrats
Seats before	16	8	8
Seats won	4	4	3
Seats after	16	9	8
- Results map
Council control before election
No overall control
Council control after election
No overall control

The 2018 Hart District Council election took place on 3 May 2018 to elect members of Hart District Council in England. This was on the same day as other local elections.

== Results ==
The election saw the Conservatives gain an independent seat, whilst Community Campaign (Hart) gained a Conservative Seat. As such, whilst the Conservatives and Liberal Democrats had no net change, Community Campaign (Hart) increased their seats by one to nine.

Hart district local election result 2018
Party	Seats	Gains	Losses	Net gain/loss	Seats %	Votes %	Votes	+/−
Conservative	4	1	1	Steady	36.36	43.1	11,155	
Liberal Democrats	3	Steady	Steady	Steady	27.27	24.3	6,295	
CCH	4	1	Steady	▲1	36.36	20.7	5,368	
Labour	Steady	Steady	Steady	Steady	Steady	7.7	2,002	
Green	Steady	Steady	Steady	Steady	Steady	2.4	616	
UKIP	Steady	Steady	Steady	Steady	Steady	1.1	275	
For Britain	Steady	Steady	Steady	Steady	Steady	0.5	118	
Monster Raving Loony	Steady	Steady	Steady	Steady	Steady	0.2	60	

== Results by Ward ==
=== Blackwater and Hawley ===
Blackwater & Hawley Ward
Party	Candidate	Votes	%	±%
Liberal Democrats	Alexander Drage	1,186	60.9	
Conservative	John Burton	527	27.1	
Labour	Lila Seling Mabo	147	7.6	
UKIP	Michael Cascoigne	86	4.4	
Majority		659		
Liberal Democrats hold		Swing		

=== Crookham East ===
Crookham East Ward
Party	Candidate	Votes	%	±%
CCH	Gillian Butler	1,486	67.5	
Conservative	Deborah Moss	557	25.3	
Labour	Ruth Williams	158	7.2	
Majority		929		
CCH hold		Swing		

=== Crookham West and Ewshot ===
Crookham West and Ewshot Ward
Party	Candidate	Votes	%	±%
CCH	Peter Collings	1,527	65.1	
Conservative	Christopher Simmons	640	27.3	
Labour	Alex Thomas	177	7.6	
Majority		887		
CCH hold		Swing		

=== Fleet Central ===
Fleet Central Ward
Party	Candidate	Votes	%	±%
CCH	Alan Oliver	1,291	49.7	
Conservative	Sebastian Gidley	995	38.3	
Labour	Harley Davies	253	9.7	
Monster Raving Loony	Alan Hope	60	2.3	
Majority			296	
CCH hold		Swing		

=== Fleet East ===
Fleet East Ward
Party	Candidate	Votes	%	±%
Conservative	Sharyn Wheale	1,149	46.3	
Liberal Democrats	Peter Wildsmith	1,056	42.5	
Labour	John Gawthorpe	169	6.8	
Green	Charles Spradbery	109	4.4	
Majority		93		
Conservative hold		Swing		

=== Fleet West ===
Fleet West Ward
Party	Candidate	Votes	%	±%
CCH	Angela Delaney	1,064	46.2	
Conservative	John Bastin	1,059	45.9	
Labour	Michael Mellor	182	7.9	
Majority		5		
CCH gain from Conservative		Swing		

=== Hartley Wintney ===
Hartney Witney Ward
Party	Candidate	Votes	%	±%
Conservative	Timothy Southern	1,462	60.8	
Liberal Democrats	Howard Kitto	531	22.1	
Green	Ruth Jarman	203	8.4	
Labour	Jacqueline Nabbs	150	6.2	
UKIP	Ruth Hamilton	59	2.5	
Majority		931		
Conservative hold		Swing		

=== Hook ===
Hook Ward
Party	Candidate	Votes	%	±%
Conservative	Jane Worlock	1,337	63.5	
Liberal Democrats	Fiona Kirkham	443	21.0	
Labour	Beaumont Nabbs	262	12.4	
UKIP	Karin Rutter	64	3.0	
Majority		894		
Conservative gain from Independent		Swing		

=== Odiham ===
Odiham Ward
Party	Candidate	Votes	%	±%
Conservative	Kenneth Crookes	1,821	73.5	
Green	Lars Mosesson	229	9.2	
Liberal Democrats	Neil Walton	216	8.7	
Labour	Amanda Affleck-Cruise	212	8.6	
Majority		1592		
Conservative hold		Swing		

=== Yateley East ===
Yateley East Ward
Party	Candidate	Votes	%	±%
Liberal Democrats	Stuart Bailey	1,416	57.9	
Conservative	Jane Dickens	701	28.7	
Labour	Satdeep Kaur Grewel	135	5.5	
For Britain	Susan Perkins	118	4.8	
Green	Francis Gantley	75	3.1	
Majority		715		
Liberal Democrats hold		Swing		

=== Yateley West ===
Yateley West Ward
Party	Candidate	Votes	%	±%
Liberal Democrats	Richard Quarterman	1,447	56.1	
Conservative	Christopher Barnes	907	35.2	
Labour	Joyce Still	158	6.1	
UKIP	John Howe	66	2.6	
Majority		540		
Liberal Democrats hold		Swing		
