= 2012 Hart District Council election =

2012 UK local government election

← 2010	3 May 2012	2014 →

11 of 35 seats to Hart District Council 18 seats needed for a majority
	First party	Second party
Party	Conservative	Liberal Democrats
Seats before	20	10
Seats won	4	3
Seats after	17	10
Seat change	▼3	Steady
Popular vote	6,376	2,919
Percentage	42.5%	19.4%
	Third party	Fourth party
Party	CCH	Independent
Seats before	5	0
Seats won	3	1
Seats after	7	1
Seat change	▲2	▲1
Popular vote	2,457	2,249
Percentage	16.4%	15.0%
- Results by Ward
Council control before election
Conservative
Council control after election
No overall control

The 2012 Hart District Council election took place on 3 May 2012 to elect members of the Hart District Council in England. This was the same day as other 2012 United Kingdom local elections.

== Ward results ==
=== Blackwater and Hawley ===
Blackwater and Hawley
Party	Candidate	Votes	%	±%
Liberal Democrats	Brian Blewett	645	62.6	
Conservative	Vivienne Gascoigne	281	27.2	
Labour	Leslie Lawrie	106	10.3	
Majority		365		
Turnout		1,032		
Liberal Democrats hold		Swing		

=== Church Crookham East ===
Church Crookham East
Party	Candidate	Votes	%	±%
CCH	James Radley	976	81.7	
Conservative	Debbie Moss	218	18.3	
Majority		758		
Turnout		1,194		
CCH hold		Swing		

=== Crondall ===
Crondall
Party	Candidate	Votes	%	±%
CCH	Tony Clarke	682	55.8	
Conservative	Nippy Singh	541	44.2	
Majority		141		
Turnout		1,223		
CCH gain from Conservative		Swing		

=== Fleet Central ===
Fleet Central
Party	Candidate	Votes	%	±%
Conservative	Akmal Gani	724	48.0	
Independent	Denis Gotel	621	41.2	
Labour	John Davies	125	8.3	
Monster Raving Loony	Howling Laud Hope	39	2.6	
Majority		103		
Turnout		1,509		
Conservative hold		Swing		

=== Fleet Courtmoor ===
Fleet Courtmoor
Party	Candidate	Votes	%	±%
CCH	John Bennison	799	52.5	
Conservative	Chris Butler	614	40.3	
Labour	Ruth Williams	110	7.2	
Majority		185		
Turnout		1,523		
CCH gain from Conservative		Swing		

=== Fleet Pondtail ===
Fleet Pondtail
Party	Candidate	Votes	%	±%
Conservative	Ian Lewis	880	60.8	
Liberal Democrats	Paul Einchcomb	421	29.1	
Independent	Satdeep Kaur Grewal	147	10.2	
Majority		459		
Turnout		1,448		
Conservative hold		Swing		

=== Fleet West ===
Fleet West
Party	Candidate	Votes	%	±%
Independent	Alan Oliver	1,481	80.4	
Conservative	Tim Davies	362	19.6	
Majority		1,119		
Turnout		1,843		
Independent gain from Conservative		Swing		

=== Hook ===
Hook
Party	Candidate	Votes	%	±%
Conservative	Mike Morris	1,251	72.1	
Labour	Verd Nabbs	340	19.6	
Liberal Democrats	Andy Whitaker	145	8.4	
Majority		1,591		
Turnout		1,736		
Conservative hold		Swing		

=== Odiham ===
Odiham
Party	Candidate	Votes	%	±%
Conservative	Stephen Gorys	888	76.5	
Liberal Democrats	Anthony Over	273	23.5	
Majority		615		
Turnout		1,161		
Conservative hold		Swing		

=== Yateley East ===
Yateley East
Party	Candidate	Votes	%	±%
Liberal Democrats	Stuart Bailey	789	68.0	
Conservative	Edward Bromhead	271	23.3	
Labour	Midge Broadley	101	8.7	
Majority		518		
Turnout		1,161		
Liberal Democrats hold		Swing		

=== Yateley West ===
Yateley West
Party	Candidate	Votes	%	±%
Liberal Democrats	Mark Murphy	646	54.5	
Conservative	Richard Woods	347	29.3	
Labour	Joyce Still	193	16.3	
Majority		993		
Turnout		1,186		
Liberal Democrats hold		Swing		
