= 2026 Hart District Council election =

2026 English local government election

- 7 May 2026

11 out of 33 seats to Hart District Council 17 seats needed for a majority
- Registered: 75,051
- Turnout: 34,657; 46.2%

	First party	Second party
Leader	David Neighbour	James Radley
Party	Liberal Democrats	CCH
Last election	12 seats, 30.4%	11 seats, 18.6%
Seats before	12	11
Seats won	5
Seats after	13
Seat change	▲1
	Third party	Fourth party
Leader	Anne Crampton
Party	Conservative	Independent
Last election	9 seats, 36.6%	1 seat, 0.0%
Seats before	9	1
Seats won	2
Seats after	8
Seat change	▼1
- Results by ward
Leader before election
David Neighbour
Liberal Democrats
No overall control (Note: Liberal Democrats/Community Campaign (Hart) coalition)
Leader after election
David Neighbour
Liberal Democrats
No overall control (Note: Liberal Democrats/Community Campaign (Hart) coalition)

The 2026 Hart District Council election was held on 7 May 2026, alongside the other local elections across the United Kingdom being held on the same day, to elect 11 of 33 members of Hart District Council in Hampshire, England.

Prior to the election, the council was under no overall control, being run by a coalition of the Liberal Democrats and local party Community Campaign (Hart) (CCH), led by Liberal Democrat councillor David Neighbour. The council remained under no overall control at this election, and the same coalition continued to run the council afterwards.

Due to ongoing local government reorganisation, this will be the final election to Hart District Council before it is abolished and replaced by a successor unitary authority. Elections to the successor authority are due to take place in 2027.

== Summary ==
=== Background ===
In 2024, the council remained under no overall control with the Liberal Democrats as the largest party.

== Election result ==
Council composition after the 2024 election

Council composition after the 2026 election

2026 Hart District Council election
Party	This election				Full council			This election		
Party	Candidates	Seats	Net	Seats %	Other	Total	Total %	Votes	Votes %	+/−
Liberal Democrats	{{{candidates}}}	5	▲1	45.45	8	13	39.39	9,488	27.47	
CCH	{{{candidates}}}	4	Steady	36.36	7	11	33.33	4,948	14.33	
Conservative	{{{candidates}}}	2	▼1	18.18	6	8	24.24	8,845	25.61	
Reform	{{{candidates}}}	0	Steady	0.00	0	0	0.00	7,971	23.08	
Green	{{{candidates}}}	0	Steady	0.00	0	0	0.00	2,734	7.91	
Labour	{{{candidates}}}	0	Steady	0.00	0	0	0.00	496	1.44	
Monster Raving Loony	{{{candidates}}}	0	Steady	0.00	0	0	0.00	56	0.16	
Independent	{{{candidates}}}	0	Steady	0.00	1	1	3.03	0	0.00	

== Ward results ==
=== Blackwater & Hawley ===
Blackwater & Hawley
Party	Candidate	Votes	%	±%
Liberal Democrats	Pam Hardy	1,101	43.1	−17.4
Reform	Caroline Rasell	823	32.2	N/A
Conservative	Nathan Love	328	12.8	−10.6
Green	Thyra Hawkes	189	7.4	N/A
Labour	Benjamin Wickins	116	4.5	−11.5
Majority		278	10.9	
Rejected ballots		5		
Turnout		2,562	39.89	
Registered electors		6,423		
Liberal Democrats hold		Swing		

=== Crookham East ===
Crookham East
Party	Candidate	Votes	%	±%
CCH	Gill Butler*	1,420	50.2	−10.4
Reform	David Lovell	519	18.4	N/A
Conservative	Andrew Henderson	411	14.5	−14.0
Liberal Democrats	Andy Parker	261	9.2	N/A
Green	Emma Peacock	217	7.7	N/A
Majority		901	31.8	
Rejected ballots		7		
Turnout		2,835	49.50	
Registered electors		5,727		
CCH hold		Swing		

=== Crookham West & Ewshot ===
Crookham West & Ewshot
Party	Candidate	Votes	%	±%
CCH	Wendy Makepeace-Brown*	1,308	37.0	−30.4
Reform	Ruth Hamilton	838	23.7	N/A
Conservative	Bruce Bulgin	765	21.6	−11.0
Liberal Democrats	Paul Einchcomb	352	10.0	N/A
Green	Andrew Fallows	271	7.7	N/A
Majority		470	13.3	
Rejected ballots		14		
Turnout		3,548	42.55	
Registered electors		8,338		
CCH hold		Swing		

=== Fleet Central ===
Fleet Central
Party	Candidate	Votes	%	±%
CCH	Alan Oliver*	1,262	40.6	−4.8
Conservative	Candice Anderson-Chase	759	24.4	−10.7
Reform	George Parnell	557	17.9	N/A
Green	Jennifer Marsden	334	10.7	N/A
Labour	Andrew Perkins	143	4.6	−11.2
Monster Raving Loony	Alan "Laud" Hope	56	1.8	−1.9
Majority		503	16.2	
Rejected ballots		11		
Turnout		3,122	46.11	
Registered electors		6,771		
CCH hold		Swing		

=== Fleet East ===
Fleet East
Party	Candidate	Votes	%	±%
Liberal Democrats	Dan Taylor*	1,392	43.7	−1.1
Conservative	Ewa Bialkowska	742	23.3	−13.6
Reform	Joe Farrugia	639	20.1	N/A
Green	Sam Davis	328	10.3	−1.8
Labour	Valmai Wainhouse	84	2.6	−8.2
Majority		650	20.4	
Rejected ballots		18		
Turnout		3,203	49.81	
Registered electors		6,430		
Liberal Democrats hold		Swing		

=== Fleet West ===
Fleet West
Party	Candidate	Votes	%	±%
CCH	Angela Delaney*	958	29.1	−14.9
Conservative	Roy Fang	859	26.1	−19.8
Liberal Democrats	Ed Molyneux	693	21.0	N/A
Reform	Candice Walmsley	573	17.4	N/A
Green	Robyn Cheong	212	6.4	N/A
Majority		99	3.0	
Rejected ballots		11		
Turnout		3,306	48.67	
Registered electors		6,792		
CCH hold		Swing		

=== Hartley Wintney ===
Hartley Wintney
Party	Candidate	Votes	%	±%
Conservative	Tim Southern*	1,510	44.2	−0.2
Liberal Democrats	Tony Over	830	24.3	−7.9
Reform	Oren Kopit	759	22.2	N/A
Green	Rob Colfer	235	6.9	N/A
Labour	Elaine Fordham	85	2.5	−7.4
Majority		680	19.9	
Rejected ballots		9		
Turnout		3,428	46.90	
Registered electors		7,309		
Conservative hold		Swing		

=== Hook ===
Hook
Party	Candidate	Votes	%	±%
Liberal Democrats	Ann Baty	1,277	35.8	+4.5
Conservative	Mike Thorne	956	26.8	−16.5
Reform	Clive Lawrence	851	23.9	N/A
Green	Graham Stacey	413	11.6	+3.0
Labour	Amanda Affleck-Cruise	68	1.9	−14.9
Majority		321	9.0	
Rejected ballots		6		
Turnout		3,571	46.94	
Registered electors		7,608		
Liberal Democrats gain from Conservative		Swing		

=== Odiham ===
Odiham
Party	Candidate	Votes	%	±%
Conservative	Jon Hale*	1,529	48.7	−10.0
Liberal Democrats	Jim Emery	682	21.7	−0.1
Reform	Gordon Smith	634	20.2	N/A
Green	Laes Mosesson	297	9.5	−1.2
Majority		847	27.0	
Rejected ballots		11		
Turnout		3,153	48.75	
Registered electors		6,468		
Conservative hold		Swing		

=== Yateley East ===
Yateley East
Party	Candidate	Votes	%	±%
Liberal Democrats	Stuart Bailey*	1,401	47.3	−12.3
Reform	Doug Wheeler	949	32.1	+21.9
Conservative	Andrew Boon	371	12.5	−5.9
Green	David McDaid	238	8.0	+4.2
Majority		452	15.2	
Rejected ballots		3		
Turnout		2,962	45.08	
Registered electors		6,571		
Liberal Democrats hold		Swing		

=== Yateley West ===
Yateley West
Party	Candidate	Votes	%	±%
Liberal Democrats	Richard Quarterman*	1,499	50.9	−24.3
Reform	Trevor Lloyd-Jones	829	28.2	N/A
Conservative	Lisa Pope	615	20.9	−3.9
Majority		670	22.7	
Rejected ballots		24		
Turnout		2,967	44.86	
Registered electors		6,614		
Liberal Democrats hold		Swing		
