= 2006 Hart District Council election =

2006 UK local government election

← 2004	4 June 2006	2007 →

13 of 35 seats to Hart District Council 18 seats needed for a majority
	First party	Second party
Party	Conservative	Liberal Democrats
Seats before	18	12
Seats won	6	3
Seats after	16	12
Popular vote	7,535	5,025
Percentage	41.0%	27.3%
	Third party	Fourth party
Party	CCH	Independent
Seats before	2	2
Seats won	3	2
Seats after	5	2
Popular vote	2,967	1,788
Percentage	16.1%	9.7%
- Results by Ward
Council control before election
No overall control
Council control after election
Conservative

The 2006 Hart Council election took place on 4 May 2006 to elect members of Hart District Council in Hampshire, England. One third of the council was up for election and the council stayed under no overall control.

After the election, the composition of the council was:

- Conservative 16
- Liberal Democrat 12
- Community Campaign (Hart) 5
- Independent 2

== Election results ==
The results saw 2 seats change hands with the Community Campaign (Hart) (CCH) group winning them both. One gain saw the Conservatives lose the seat of Church Crookham East, which Peter Hutcheson had held for the Conservatives for over 20 years, to the CCH. The other gain saw the CCH win Crondall by 2 votes over the Conservatives, gaining the seat which had formerly been held by Independent Norman Lambert. Lambert had resigned from the Conservative group in 2005 after admitting making false claims for council tax and housing benefit. The changes meant that the Conservatives remained the largest party on the council with 16 seats but were vulnerable to a coalition among the other groups. Overall turnout in the election was 39.35%.

Following the election the Conservative administration of the council, which had run the council for the previous 8 years, was voted out. They were replaced by a new Coalition Political Group, which was formed by the 12 Liberal Democrats, 5 Community Campaign (Hart) councillors and 1 of the 2 Independents, Denis Gotel. The leader of the Liberal Democrat group on the council, David Neighbour, became leader of the new group and the new leader of the council.

Hart local election result 2006
Party	Seats	Gains	Losses	Net gain/loss	Seats %	Votes %	Votes	+/−
Conservative	6	0	1	-1	46.2	42.9	8,158	-2.6
Liberal Democrats	2	0	0	0	15.4	26.5	5,025	-4.8
CCH	3	2	0	+2	23.1	15.6	2,967	+0.6
Independent	2	0	1	-1	15.4	9.4	1,788	+4.0
Labour	0	0	0	0	0.0	2.2	418	+0.7
Green	0	0	0	0	0.0	1.7	323	+1.7
BNP	0	0	0	0	0.0	1.7	318	+0.6

== Ward results ==
=== Church Crookham East ===
Church Crookham East
Party	Candidate	Votes	%	±%
CCH	Gillian Butler	887	54.8	−0.4
Conservative	Christopher Butler	643	39.7	−5.1
Labour	Sarah Snape	88	5.4	+5.4
Majority		244	15.1	+4.6
Turnout		1,618	43.4	−0.3
CCH gain from Conservative		Swing		

=== Church Crookham West ===
Church Crookham West
Party	Candidate	Votes	%	±%
CCH	Simon Ambler	1,001	69.2	+5.6
Conservative	Michael Hall	396	27.4	−9.0
Labour	Mitchell Wensley	50	3.5	+3.5
Majority		605	41.8	+14.7
Turnout		1,447	38.8	+2.8
CCH hold		Swing		

=== Crondall ===
Crondall
Party	Candidate	Votes	%	±%
CCH	John Bennison	590	50.1	+19.9
Conservative	David Evans	588	49.9	−0.1
Majority		2	0.2	
Turnout		1,178	40.3	−4.5
CCH gain from Conservative		Swing		

=== Fleet Central ===
Fleet Central
Party	Candidate	Votes	%	±%
Independent	Denis Gotel	726	47.6	−0.3
Conservative	Virginia Heffernan	702	46.0	−6.1
Labour	John Davies	97	6.4	+6.4
Majority		24	1.6	
Turnout		1,525	37.7	−1.7
Independent hold		Swing		

=== Fleet North ===
Fleet North
Party	Candidate	Votes	%	±%
Conservative	Stephen Parker	850	55.8	+4.4
Liberal Democrats	Maria Van Dolen	672	44.2	−4.4
Majority		178	11.7	+9.0
Turnout		1,522	34.2	+10.6
Conservative hold		Swing		

=== Fleet Pondtail ===
Fleet Pondtail
Party	Candidate	Votes	%	±%
Conservative	Sharyn Wheale	912	46.9	+15.4
Liberal Democrats	Rodney Fisher	836	43.0	−25.5
Independent	David Green	160	8.2	+8.2
Labour	Sheila Stone	37	1.9	+1.9
Majority		76	3.9	
Turnout		1,945	54.1	+6.6
Conservative hold		Swing		

=== Fleet West ===
Fleet West (2)
Party	Candidate	Votes	%	±%
Conservative	Richard Appleton	782		
Conservative	Andrew Davies	623		
Liberal Democrats	Christopher Griffin	525		
CCH	Peter Keep	489		
Green	Maria Keith	232		
Turnout		2,651	39.1	−2.3
Conservative hold		Swing		
Conservative hold		Swing		

=== Frogmore and Darby Green ===
Frogmore and Darby Green
Party	Candidate	Votes	%	±%
Liberal Democrats	Robert Harward	992	70.7	+8.6
Conservative	Nigel Milton-Tomkins	326	23.2	−3.2
Labour	Joyce Still	85	6.1	−5.4
Majority		666	47.5	+11.9
Turnout		1,403	35.0	+11.7
Liberal Democrats hold		Swing		

=== Hartley Wintney ===
Hartley Wintney
Party	Candidate	Votes	%	±%
Independent	Susan Band	902	54.4	+54.4
Liberal Democrats	Nicola Dommett	438	26.4	+2.1
BNP	Roger Robertson	318	19.2	+19.2
Majority		464	28.0	
Turnout		1,658	44.2	+13.9
Independent hold		Swing		

=== Hook ===
Hook
Party	Candidate	Votes	%	±%
Conservative	Jonathan Glen	1,448	73.4	+16.9
Liberal Democrats	Richard Robinson	526	26.6	−7.6
Majority		922	46.7	+24.4
Turnout		1,974	34.2	−3.5
Conservative hold		Swing		

=== Long Sutton ===
Long Sutton
Party	Candidate	Votes	%	±%
Conservative	Sarah Wallis	452	71.2	
Liberal Democrats	Roger Carter	92	14.5	
Green	Lars Mosesson	91	14.3	
Majority		360	56.7	
Turnout		635	36.5	
Conservative hold		Swing		

=== Yateley North ===
Yateley North
Party	Candidate	Votes	%	±%
Liberal Democrats	Colin Ive	944	65.5	+4.4
Conservative	Edward Dawson	436	30.3	−3.6
Labour	Mary Jenkins	61	4.2	−0.8
Majority		508	35.3	+8.1
Turnout		1,441	38.1	+5.0
Liberal Democrats hold		Swing		

Preceded by 2004 Hart Council election	Hart local elections	Succeeded by 2007 Hart Council election
