= 2007 Hart District Council election =

2007 UK local government election

← 2006	3 May 2007	2008 →

12 of 35 seats to Hart District Council 18 seats needed for a majority
	First party	Second party	Third party
Party	Conservative	Liberal Democrats	CCH
Seats before	16	12	5
Seats won	5	5	2
Seats after	15	12	6
Popular vote	8,595	5,567	1,791
Percentage	50.9%	33.0%	10.6%
- Results by Ward
Council control before election
No overall control
Council control after election
No overall control

The 2007 Hart Council election took place on 3 May 2007 to elect members of Hart District Council in Hampshire, England. One third of the council was up for election and the council stayed under no overall control.

After the election, the composition of the council was:

- Conservative 15
- Liberal Democrat 12
- Community Campaign (Hart) 6
- Independent 2

== Election results ==
The results saw the council remain without any party having a majority. The Conservatives remained the largest party with 15 seats despite losing 1 seat to the Community Campaign (Hart) (CCH). Christopher Axam gained Fleet Courtmoor for the CCH after winning 828 votes, compared to 758 for the Conservatives. This meant the CCH had 6 seats on the council, while the Liberal Democrats held the seats they had been defending to remain with 12 councillors. Overall turnout in the election was 35.85%.

Following the election a Conservative bid to take control of the council failed with the existing Liberal Democrat, Community Campaign (Hart) and Independent coalition continuing after a 20-15 vote.

Hart local election result 2007
Party	Seats	Gains	Losses	Net gain/loss	Seats %	Votes %	Votes	+/−
Conservative	5	0	1	-1	41.7	50.8	8,595	+7.9
Liberal Democrats	5	0	0	0	41.7	33.0	5,587	+6.5
CCH	2	1	0	+1	16.7	10.6	1,791	-5.0
Labour	0	0	0	0	0.0	2.9	492	+0.7
BNP	0	0	0	0	0.0	2.4	405	+0.7
Monster Raving Loony	0	0	0	0	0.0	0.2	42	+0.2

== Ward results ==
=== Blackwater and Hawley ===
Blackwater and Hawley
Party	Candidate	Votes	%	±%
Liberal Democrats	David Neighbour	834	57.4	−2.6
Conservative	Vivienne Gascoigne	619	42.6	+6.0
Majority		215	14.8	−8.6
Turnout		1,453	42.9	−1.5
Liberal Democrats hold		Swing		

=== Church Crookham West ===
Church Crookham West
Party	Candidate	Votes	%	±%
CCH	Jennifer Radley	963	67.6	−1.6
Conservative	Eleanor Whyte	462	32.4	+5.0
Majority		501	35.2	−6.6
Turnout		1,425	37.7	−1.1
CCH hold		Swing		

=== Eversley ===
Eversley
Party	Candidate	Votes	%	±%
Conservative	Hugo Eastwood	704	87.5	
Liberal Democrats	Christopher Clark	101	12.5	
Majority		603	75.0	
Turnout		805	39.2	
Conservative hold		Swing		

=== Fleet Courtmoor ===
Fleet Courtmoor
Party	Candidate	Votes	%	±%
CCH	Christopher Axam	828	48.3	+48.3
Conservative	Christopher Butler	758	44.2	−4.7
Labour	Sheila Stone	87	5.1	+5.1
Monster Raving Loony	Alan Hope	42	2.4	+2.4
Majority		70	4.1	
Turnout		1,715	46.1	+2.3
CCH gain from Conservative		Swing		

=== Fleet North ===
Fleet North
Party	Candidate	Votes	%	±%
Conservative	William Barrell	874	59.9	+4.1
Liberal Democrats	Maria Van Dolen	584	40.1	−4.1
Majority		290	19.9	+8.2
Turnout		1,458	30.4	−3.8
Conservative hold		Swing		

=== Frogmore and Darby Green ===
Frogmore and Darby Green
Party	Candidate	Votes	%	±%
Liberal Democrats	Vivien Street	744	61.9	−8.8
Conservative	Richard Fielden	354	29.5	+6.3
Labour	Joyce Still	103	8.6	+2.5
Majority		390	32.5	−15.0
Turnout		1,201	29.9	−5.1
Liberal Democrats hold		Swing		

=== Hartley Wintney ===
Hartley Wintney
Party	Candidate	Votes	%	±%
Conservative	Sara-Lea Kinnell	859	55.7	+55.7
Liberal Democrats	Christopher Griffin	461	29.9	+3.5
BNP	Roger Robertson	222	14.4	−4.8
Majority		398	25.8	
Turnout		1,542	39.7	−4.5
Conservative hold		Swing		

=== Hook ===
Hook
Party	Candidate	Votes	%	±%
Conservative	Andrew Henderson	1,460	71.9	−1.5
Liberal Democrats	David Evans	572	28.1	+1.5
Majority		888	43.7	−3.0
Turnout		2,032	33.3	−0.9
Conservative hold		Swing		

=== Odiham ===
Odiham
Party	Candidate	Votes	%	±%
Conservative	Kenneth Crookes	1,268	83.6	+12.7
Liberal Democrats	Roger Carter	249	16.4	−7.7
Majority		1,019	67.2	+20.5
Turnout		1,517	40.9	−1.2
Conservative hold		Swing		

=== Yateley East ===
Yateley East
Party	Candidate	Votes	%	±%
Liberal Democrats	Graham Cockarill	745	57.0	+1.4
Conservative	Edward Dawson	470	35.9	+4.8
Labour	John Davies	93	7.1	−0.5
Majority		275	21.0	−3.6
Turnout		1,308	32.6	−2.0
Liberal Democrats hold		Swing		

=== Yateley North ===
Yateley North
Party	Candidate	Votes	%	±%
Liberal Democrats	David Simpson	744	60.3	−5.2
Conservative	James Lawrence	423	34.3	+4.0
Labour	David Jenkins	67	5.4	+1.2
Majority		321	26.0	−9.3
Turnout		1,234	32.3	−5.8
Liberal Democrats hold		Swing		

Yateley West
Party	Candidate	Votes	%	±%
Liberal Democrats	Myra Billings	553	45.3	−12.4
Conservative	Edward Bromhead	344	28.2	−4.3
BNP	Geoffrey Crompton	183	15.0	+15.0
Labour	Mary Jenkins	142	11.6	+1.8
Majority		209	17.1	−8.0
Turnout		1,222	31.5	−1.5
Liberal Democrats hold		Swing		

Preceded by 2006 Hart Council election	Hart local elections	Succeeded by 2008 Hart Council election
