= 2021 Hart District Council election =

2021 UK local government election

- 6 May 2021

12 of the 33 seats to Hart District Council 17 seats needed for a majority
	First party	Second party	Third party
Party	Conservative	CCH	Liberal Democrats
Last election	3	4	4
Seats before	11	11	10
	Fourth party
Party	Independent
Last election	1
- Map showing the results of the 2021 Hart District Council election
Council control before election
No overall control
Council control after election
No overall control

Elections to Hart District Council took place on 6 May 2021 as part of the 2021 United Kingdom local elections. This took place at the same time as the elections for Hampshire County Council and the Hampshire Police and Crime Commissioner.

== Background ==
Council composition prior to the election

The previous election saw the Conservatives lose five seats, two each to Community Campaign Hart and the Liberal Democrats, and one to an independent candidate. The council remained under no overall control, with the Conservative Party and Community Campaign the joint largest parties with eleven seats each overall. Subsequently, an administration was formed by Community Campaign Hart and the Liberal Democrats, with Liberal Democrat Councillor David Neighbour becoming leader of the council, and Community Campaign Hart Councillor James Radley becoming deputy leader of the council.

== Results summary ==
2021 Hart District Council election
Party	This election				Full council			This election		
Party	Candidates	Seats	Net	Seats %	Other	Total	Total %	Votes	Votes %	+/−
Conservative	{{{candidates}}}	6	▲1	50.0	6	12	37.5	16,181	49.2	+18.5
Liberal Democrats	{{{candidates}}}	3	Steady	25.0	7	10	31.3	7,363	22.4	-6.6
CCH	{{{candidates}}}	3	▼1	25.0	7	10	31.3	6,163	18.7	-4.2
Labour	{{{candidates}}}	0	Steady	0.0	0	0	0.0	1,972	6.0	+1.9
Green	{{{candidates}}}	0	Steady	0.0	0	0	0.0	888	2.7	-1.1
Monster Raving Loony	{{{candidates}}}	0	Steady	0.0	0	0	0.0	194	0.6	+0.2
Hampshire Independents	{{{candidates}}}	0	Steady	0.0	0	0	0.0	99	0.3	New
Reform	{{{candidates}}}	0	Steady	0.0	0	0	0.0	57	0.2	New

== Ward results ==
=== Blackwater & Hawley ===
Blackwater & Hawley
Party	Candidate	Votes	%	±%
Liberal Democrats	Brian Blewett	1,281	57.6	−12.8
Conservative	John Burton	764	34.4	+16.1
Labour	Carly Bidwell	179	8.0	N/A
Majority				
Turnout		2,235	36.12	
Liberal Democrats hold		Swing		

=== Crookham East ===
Crookham East
Party	Candidate	Votes	%	±%
CCH	Edward Radley	1,501	56.7	−15.6
Conservative	Stephen Parker	1,144	43.3	+20.1
Majority				
Turnout		2,678	44.77	
CCH hold		Swing		

=== Crookham West & Ewshot ===
Crookham West & Ewshot (2)
Party	Candidate	Votes	%	±%
CCH	Tina Collins	1,431	47.4	−27.0
CCH	Simon Ambler	1,417	47.0	−27.4
Conservative	Richard Martin	1,223	40.5	+20.2
Conservative	Michael Thorne	1,008	33.4	+13.1
Labour	Ollie Royan	269	8.9	+3.7
Majority				
Turnout		3,037	38.52	
CCH hold		Swing		
CCH hold		Swing		

=== Fleet Central ===
Fleet Central
Party	Candidate	Votes	%	±%
Conservative	Mark Butcher	1,333	47.4	+22.2
CCH	Wendy Makepeace-Browne	955	33.9	−30.3
Labour	Andrew Perkins	237	8.4	+2.5
Green	Lucy Purdy	219	7.8	N/A
Monster Raving Loony	Howling Laud Hope	71	2.5	−2.2
Majority				
Turnout		2,831	41.49	
Conservative gain from CCH		Swing		

=== Fleet East ===
Fleet East
Party	Candidate	Votes	%	±%
Conservative	Jonathan Wright	1,343	49.6	+16.0
Liberal Democrats	Paul Einchcomb	1,018	37.6	−22.8
Labour	Val Wainhouse	221	8.2	+2.2
Monster Raving Loony	Miss Young Powerhouse	123	4.5	N/A
Majority				
Turnout		2,715	44.86	
Conservative hold		Swing		

=== Fleet West ===
Fleet West
Party	Candidate	Votes	%	±%
Conservative	Steve Forster	1,682	56.8	+26.8
CCH	Mandie Bedford	859	29.0	−27.1
Green	Wayne Rozier	194	6.6	−3.3
Labour	Mike Mellor	167	5.6	+1.7
Reform	Roy Fang	57	1.9	N/A
Majority				
Turnout		2,968	43.61	
Conservative hold		Swing		

=== Hartley Wintney ===
Hartley Wintney
Party	Candidate	Votes	%	±%
Conservative	Anne Crampton	2,301	74.2	+32.1
Liberal Democrats	Alex Brewer	800	25.8	−8.2
Majority		1,501	48.4	
Turnout		3,152	42.26	
Conservative hold		Swing		

=== Hook ===
Hook
Party	Candidate	Votes	%	±%
Conservative	Selena Coburn	1,561	55.2	+23.4
Liberal Democrats	Russell Elliss	916	32.4	+0.9
Labour	Amanda Affleck-Cruise	352	12.4	+0.5
Majority				
Turnout		2,850	40.17	
Conservative hold		Swing		

=== Odiham ===
Odiham
Party	Candidate	Votes	%	±%
Conservative	John Kennett	1,898	67.6	+11.6
Green	Lars Mosesson	475	16.9	−2.6
Liberal Democrats	Tony Over	436	15.5	−8.9
Majority				
Turnout		2,824	41.93	
Conservative hold		Swing		

=== Yateley East ===
Yateley East
Party	Candidate	Votes	%	±%
Liberal Democrats	Graham Cockarill	1,279	48.7	−19.1
Conservative	Christopher Barnes	914	34.8	+7.8
Labour	John Davies	335	12.8	+7.6
Hampshire Independents	Caroline Mussared	99	3.8	N/A
Majority				
Turnout		2,646	38.68	
Liberal Democrats hold		Swing		

=== Yateley West ===
Yateley West
Party	Candidate	Votes	%	±%
Liberal Democrats	Gerry Crisp	1,633	57.2	−6.7
Conservative	Shawn Dickens	1,010	35.4	+14.1
Labour	Joyce Still	212	7.4	+2.6
Majority				
Turnout		2,873	43.14	
Liberal Democrats hold		Swing		
