= 2017 Hampshire County Council election =

2017 UK local government election

- 4 May 2017

All 78 seats to Hampshire County Council 40 seats needed for a majority
	First party	Second party
Party	Conservative	Liberal Democrats
Last election	45	17
Seats before	47	16
Seats won	56	19
Seat change	▲11	▲2
Popular vote	198,944	102,642
Percentage	52.22%	26.93%
Swing		▼11.18%
	Third party	Fourth party
Party	Labour	CCH
Last election	4, 10.6%	1
Seats before	4	1
Seats won	2	1
Seat change	▼2	Steady
Popular vote	40,501	5,282
Percentage	10.63%	1.39%
- Map showing the results of the 2017 Hampshire County Council election.

Council control before election
Conservative
Council control after election
Conservative

The 2017 Hampshire County Council election took place on 4 May 2017 as part of the 2017 local elections in the United Kingdom. All councillors were elected from electoral divisions by first-past-the-post voting for a four-year term of office. The electoral divisions were somewhat changed from the previous election, with some being split, merged or with boundary changes. No elections were held in Portsmouth and Southampton, which are unitary authorities and hold their elections in other years. Similarly the districts within Hampshire did also not hold elections this year.

== Summary ==
The incumbent Conservatives (majority since 1997) increased their majority from 45 to 56, over a two thirds majority, whilst the Liberal Democrats, the second largest party, won two new seats, increasing their seats to 19.The Liberal Democrats performed best around Winchester, and Eastleigh, whilst the Conservatives performed well across rural areas. Labour and UKIP meanwhile both lost seats, with Labour losing two of their four seats in Basingstoke, whilst UKIP lost all representation across the County. Community Campaign (Hart) managed to retain their only seat, Church Crookham & Ewshot, while also standing in a second county seat for the first time in Fleet Town, where they came second place after the Conservatives, who won with a majority of 508. The Green Party also increased their vote share, but failed to gain representation. The sole Independent incumbent, in Lymington, lost their seat.

== Boundary changes ==
The Local Government Boundary Commission for England undertook a review of boundaries during the previous council's term. An Order to enact the boundary changes was made in October 2016 and took effect at this election.

By district, the changes made included:

- Basingstoke and Deane: retained 10 seats. The west of the Norden ward was transferred from Basingstoke North to Basingstoke Central. Eastrop and the town centre was transferred from Basingstoke Central to Basingstoke South East. Kingsclere was transferred from Calleva & Kingsclere to Whitchurch & Clere, with the wards respectively renamed Calleva and Whitchurch & The Cleres. Candovers was renamed Candovers, Oakley and Overton.
- East Hampshire retained 7 seats. Headley was renamed Liphook, Headley & Grayshott.
- Eastleigh was increased from 7 to 8 seats. The divisions of Hedge End & Botley and West End & Hedge End Grange Park were abolished and replaced with three divisions: Botley & Hedge End North, Hedge End & West End South and West End & Horton Heath. The latter also took away territory from Bishopstoke & Fair Oak, which was shifted westwards. The East and West divisions of Eastleigh were replaced by divisions named North and South.
- Fareham retained 7 seats. The 6 divisions had the same names as before, with Fareham Town continuing to elect 2 councillors.
- Gosport retained 5 seats. The 5 divisions had the same names as before, with Leesland & Town continuing to elect 2 councillors.
- Hart retained 5 seats. The Odiham and Hartley Wintney & Yateley West divisions were replaced with divisions with similar boundaries named Odiham & Hook and Hartley Wintney, Eversley & Yateley West. The Fleet division was reduced in size and renamed Fleet Town. It also gained some territory from Yateley East, Blackwater & Ancells, which was renamed Yateley East & Blackwater.
- Havant retained 7 seats. The 2-member division of Bedhampton & Leigh Park was split and replaced by North West Havant and North East Havant, with the latter taking territory from Emsworth & St Faiths.
- New Forest was reduced from 11 to 10 seats. The division of Lyndhurst was abolished. The town of Lyndhurst itself was added to the same division of Fordingbridge, and named Lyndhurst & Fordingbridge. Totton North added some rural areas and was renamed Totton North & Netley Marsh. An expanded Lymington division was renamed Lymington & Boldre. Milford & Hordle gained some territory from New Milton and was renamed New Milton North, Milford & Hordle.
- Rushmoor retained 5 seats. The East and West divisions of Aldershot were replaced with North and South divisions.
- Test Valley retained 7 seats. Romsey Extra was renamed Romsey Rural.
- Winchester retained 7 seats. The divisions retained their names, though the boundary between Bishop's Waltham and Meon Valley was altered substantially.

== Results ==
Hampshire County Council election, 2017
Party	Seats	Gains	Losses	Net gain/loss	Seats %	Votes %	Votes	+/−
Conservative	56	11	0	11	71.79	52.22	198,944	+14.71
Liberal Democrats	19	4	3	1	24.36	26.93	102,642	+5.22
Labour	2	0	2	-2	2.56	10.63	40,501	+0.05
UKIP	0	0	10	-10	0.00	4.12	15,702	-20.49
Green	0	0	0	0	0.00	3.24	12,329	+0.46
Community Campaign (Hart)	1	0	0	0	1.28	1.39	5,282	+0.68
Independent	0	0	1	-1	0.00	1.33	5059	-0.56
JAC	0	0	0	0	0.00	0.08	288	N/A
Pirate	0	0	0	0	0.00	0.03	108	N/A
Monster Raving Loony	0	0	0	0	0.00	0.02	78	-0.01
TUSC	0	0	0	0	0.00	0.02	61	-0.02
BNP	0	0	0	0	0.00	0.01	30	-0.08
Christian	0	0	0	0	0.00	0.00	0 (Note: No candidates stood in 2017)	-0.06

== Results by electoral division ==
Hampshire County Council is divided into 11 districts, which are split further into electoral divisions. Asterisks denote incumbent Councillors seeking re-election. Councillors seeking re-election were elected in 2013, and results are compared to that year's polls on that basis.

=== Basingstoke and Deane (10 seats) ===
Basingstoke and Deane

Basingstoke Central
Party	Candidate	Votes	%	±%
Labour	Michael Westbrook	1,933	49.14	▲12.31%
Conservative	Brian Simmonds	1,330	33.81	▲15.81%
Liberal Democrats	Doris Jones	424	10.78	▼8.29%
Green	Matthew Pinto	246	6.41	new
Majority		603	15.73	
Turnout		3933	29	
Labour hold		Swing		

No UKIP candidate as previous (-26).

Basingstoke North
Party	Candidate	Votes	%	±%
Labour	Jane Frankum*	1,802	58.54	▲4.00%
Conservative	Paul Miller	807	26.21	▲11.71%
Liberal Democrats	Zoe-Marie Rogers	247	8.02	▲2.3%
UKIP	Duncan Stone	222	7.21	▼18.03%
Majority		995	32.32	
Turnout		3078	24	
Labour hold		Swing		

Basingstoke North West
Party	Candidate	Votes	%	±%
Conservative	Robert Taylor	1,596	45.21	▲7.23%
Labour	Antony Jones	1,439	40.76	▲7.55%
Liberal Democrats	Stephen Day	266	7.53	▲4.14%
UKIP	Philip Heath	229	6.48	▼18.94%
Majority		157	4.44	
Turnout		3530	28	
Conservative hold		Swing		

Basingstoke South East
Party	Candidate	Votes	%	±%
Liberal Democrats	Gavin James	1,862	41.43	▲6.77%
Conservative	Terri Reid	1,347	29.97	▲13.64%
Labour	Andrew McCormick	943	20.98	▼1.34%
UKIP	Spencer Cleary	342	7.61	▼19.08%
Majority		515	11.45	
Turnout		4494	30	
Liberal Democrats hold		Swing		

Basingstoke South West
Party	Candidate	Votes	%	±%
Conservative	Stephen Reid*	3,200	63.19	▲14.3%
Labour	Ian Edney	862	17.02	▲3.78%
Liberal Democrats	Carl Reader	665	13.13	▲4.81%
UKIP	David White	337	6.65	▼22.73%
Majority		2338	46.16	
Turnout		5064	33	
Conservative hold		Swing		

Stephen Reid was the incumbent councillor for a neighboring ward, Basingstoke North West.

Calleva
Party	Candidate	Votes	%	±%
Conservative	Rhydian Vaughan	3,069	76.07	▲18.16%
Labour	Stephen Rothman	733	18.17	▲6.81%
UKIP	Paul Kelly	232	5.75	▼16.02%
Majority		2336	57.97	
Turnout		4034	40	
Conservative hold		Swing		

No Liberal Democrat candidate as previous (-9).

Candovers, Oakley & Overton
Party	Candidate	Votes	%	±%
Conservative	Anna Scott*	2,623	54.57	▲15.00%
Independent	Ian Tilbury	883	18.37	▼5.38%
Liberal Democrats	Lucy Williams	767	15.95	▲9.85%
Labour	Helen Jeffrey	336	6.99	▲0.16%
UKIP	Alan Simpson	197	4.09	▼19.73%
Majority		1740	36.20	
Turnout		4806	41	
Conservative hold		Swing		

Loddon
Party	Candidate	Votes	%	±%
Conservative	Elaine Still*	3,310	70.56	▲21.00%
Liberal Democrats	Richard Lilleker	665	14.17	▲7.72%
Labour	Mary Brian	484	10.31	▲1.45%
UKIP	Sue Perkins	232	4.94	▼21.1%
Majority		2645	56.38	
Turnout		4691	32	
Conservative hold		Swing		

No Independent candidate as previous (-9).

Tadley and Baughurst
Party	Candidate	Votes	%	±%
Conservative	Derek Mellor	1,977	46.79	▲14.87%
Liberal Democrats	Warwick Lovegrove*	1,833	43.38	▲6.99%
Labour	David Foden	246	5.82	▲0.52%
Green	Anne Mockford	169	4.00	n/a
Majority		144	3.40	
Turnout		4225	33	
Conservative gain from Liberal Democrats		Swing		

No UKIP candidate as previous (-25).

Whitchurch and the Cleres
Party	Candidate	Votes	%	±%
Conservative	Tom Thacker*	3,012	61.59	▲12.39%
Liberal Democrats	Linda Stepney	1,128	23.06	▲4.28%
Labour	John Rodway	461	9.42	▲0.48%
Green	Andrew Smith	289	5.91	n/a
Majority		1884	38.52	
Turnout		37	4890	
Conservative hold		Swing		

No UKIP candidate as previous (-23).

=== East Hampshire (7 seats) ===
East Hampshire

Alton Rural
Party	Candidate	Votes	%	±%
Conservative	Mark Kemp-Gee*	3,625	70	▲14%
Liberal Democrats	Nicholas James	762	15	▲4%
Labour	Janice Treacher	314	6	▼3%
Green	Christina West	298	6	n/a
UKIP	Rigby Andrews	192	4	▼20%
Majority		2863		
Turnout		5191	41	
Conservative hold		Swing		

Alton Town
Party	Candidate	Votes	%	±%
Conservative	Andrew Joy*	2,463	48	▲5%
Liberal Democrats	John Pritchard	1,997	39	▲19%
Labour	Kellie Griffin	321	6	▼7%
Green	Eleanor Hill	298	6	n/a
Majority		466		
Turnout		5079	37	
Conservative hold		Swing		

No UKIP candidate as previous (-24).

Catherington
Party	Candidate	Votes	%	±%
Conservative	Marge Harvey*	3,204	72	▲29%
Liberal Democrats	Elaine Woodard	701	16	▼5%
Labour	Michael Burgess	322	7	▲1%
Green	Helena Hurd	197	4	0%
Majority		2503		
Turnout		4424	35	
Conservative hold		Swing		

No UKIP candidate as previous (-24).

Liphook, Headley & Grayshott
Party	Candidate	Votes	%	±%
Conservative	Floss Mitchell	3,021	63	▲6%
Liberal Democrats	Trevor Maroney	1,353	28	▲18%
Labour	John Tough	347	7	▼2%
JAC	Eddie Trotter	89	2	n/a
Majority		1668		
Turnout		4810	37	
Conservative hold		Swing		

No UKIP candidate as previous (-24).

Petersfield Butser
Party	Candidate	Votes	%	±%
Conservative	Rob Mocatta	2,760	53	▲14%
Liberal Democrats	David Podger	1,425	27	▲6%
Labour	Helen Bolitho	431	8	▼1%
Green	Roger Wallsgrove	313	6	▼3%
UKIP	Jim Makin	268	5	▼17%
Majority		1335		
Turnout		5197	38	
Conservative hold		Swing		

Petersfield Hangers
Party	Candidate	Votes	%	±%
Conservative	Russell Oppenheimer	3,243	59	▲6%
Liberal Democrats	Louise Bevan	1,221	22	▲11%
Labour	Howard Linsley	462	8	▼1%
Green	Peter Bisset	319	6	▼1%
UKIP	Malcom Bint	168	3	▼16%
JAC	Steve Whiting	44	1	n/a
Majority		2022		
Turnout		5457	41	
Conservative hold		Swing		

Whitehill, Bordon & Lindford
Party	Candidate	Votes	%	±%
Conservative	Adam Carew*	1,822	57	▲38%
Liberal Democrats	Sally Pond	652	20	▼23%
Independent	Neville Taylor	444	14	n/a
Labour	Digby Payne	292	9	▲2%
Majority		1170		
Turnout		3210	29	
Conservative gain from Liberal Democrats		Swing		

Carew was originally elected to Hampshire County Council in 2005 as a Liberal Democrat. Two months after the previous election, in July 2013, he defected to the Conservatives.

No UKIP candidate as previous (-30).

=== Eastleigh (8 seats) ===
Eastleigh

Bishopstoke & Fair Oak
Party	Candidate	Votes	%	±%
Liberal Democrats	Mike Thornton	1,980	39	▲3%
Independent	Louise Parker-Jones	1,124	22	n/a
Conservative	Steven Broomfield	1,000	20	▲6%
UKIP	John Edwards	451	9	▼31%
Labour	Ray Bellinger	364	7	▼2%
Green	Dave Hubble	124	2	n/a
Majority		856		
Turnout		4616	33	
Liberal Democrats gain from UKIP		Swing		

Botley & Hedge End North
Party	Candidate	Votes	%	±%
Liberal Democrats	Rupert Kyrle*	2,158	54	▲18%
Conservative	Jamie Mills	1,361	34	▲9%
Labour	Kevin Williamson	246	6	0%
Green	Rosanna Campbell	125	3	n/a
UKIP	Ann King	112	3	▼30%
Majority		797		
Turnout		4002	35	
Liberal Democrats hold		Swing		

Changes compared with the old Botley & Hedge End ward.

Chandler’s Ford
Party	Candidate	Votes	%	±%
Conservative	Judith Grajewski	2,961	54	▲15%
Liberal Democrats	James Duguid	2,081	38	▲6%
Labour	Sarah Mann	314	6	▲1%
UKIP	Peter House	177	3	▼19%
Majority		880		
Turnout		5533	46	−
Conservative hold		Swing		

No Green candidate as previous (-3).

Eastleigh North
Party	Candidate	Votes	%	±%
Liberal Democrats	Daniel Clarke	1,966	46	▲11%
Conservative	Chris Yates	926	22	▲11%
UKIP	Andy Moore*	676	16	▼23%
Labour	Kathy O'Neill	494	12	▲1%
Green	Alexander Hughes	199	5	▲2%
Majority		1040		
Turnout		4261	36	
Liberal Democrats gain from UKIP		Swing		

No Christian candidate as previous (-1). Changes compared with the old Eastleigh East ward, which is largely similar to this ward in all but name.

Eastleigh South
Party	Candidate	Votes	%	±%
Liberal Democrats	Wayne Irish	2,445	51	▲17%
Conservative	Simon Payne	1,361	28	▲13%
Labour	Shere Sattar	557	12	▼1%
UKIP	Andy Whitehouse	443	9	▼26%
Majority		1084		
Turnout		4806	33	
Liberal Democrats gain from UKIP		Swing		

No Green candidate (-2), No Monster Raving Loony candidate (-1) and No TUSC candidate (-0) as previous. Changes compared with the old Eastleigh West ward, which is largely similar to this ward in all but name.

Hamble
Party	Candidate	Votes	%	±%
Liberal Democrats	Keith House*	3,090	57	▲14%
Conservative	Edward Giles	1,690	31	▲10%
Labour	Siobhan O'Rourke	313	6	0%
UKIP	Paul Webber	201	4	▼27%
Green	Anna Wyse	126	2	n/a
Majority		1400		
Turnout		5420	39	
Liberal Democrats hold		Swing		

Hedge End & West End South
Party	Candidate	Votes	%	±%
Liberal Democrats	Tonia Craig	2,451	50	
Conservative	Jerry Hall	1,954	40	
Labour	Terry Crow	285	6	
UKIP	Hugh McGuinness	208	4	
Majority		497		
Turnout		4898	42	
Liberal Democrats win (new seat)				

No comparisons available for this ward as no direct predecessor ward exists. The ward is made up of a large part of the old Botley and Hedge End ward while also encompassing small parts of the old Hamble ward and the old West End and Hedge End Grange Park ward.

West End & Horton Heath
Party	Candidate	Votes	%	±%
Liberal Democrats	Bruce Tennent*	1,803	52	▲12%
Conservative	Ben Burcombe-Filer	1,108	32	▲12%
Labour	Geoff Kosted	206	6	0%
UKIP	Martin Lyon*	195	6	▼28%
Green	Glynn Fleming	150	4	n/a
Majority		702		
Turnout		3462	35	
Liberal Democrats hold		Swing		

Lyon was the incumbent UKIP councillor for Bishopstoke and Fair Oak. Changes compared with the old West End and Hedge End Grange Park ward.

=== Fareham (7 seats) ===
Fareham

Fareham Crofton
Party	Candidate	Votes	%	±%
Conservative	Pal Hayre	3,029	49	▲16%
Liberal Democrats	Jim Forrest	2,274	37	▲24%
UKIP	Kim Rose	411	7	▼44%
Labour	Leslie Ricketts	267	4	▲1%
Green	Rosemary Hobbs	158	3	n/a
Majority		755	12.2	N/A
Turnout		6139	46.3	+0.9
Conservative gain from UKIP		Swing		

Fareham Portchester
Party	Candidate	Votes	%	±%
Liberal Democrats	Roger Price*	2,648	47.3	▼8.6%
Conservative	Geoff Fazackarley	2,504	44.7	▲18.1%
Labour	Stuart Rose	450	8.0	▼2.0%
Majority		144	2.6	−26.8
Turnout		5602	38.3	+8.8
Liberal Democrats hold		Swing	13.4	

No Green candidate as previous (-8).

Fareham Sarisbury
Party	Candidate	Votes	%	±%
Conservative	Sean Woodward*	2,818	70	0%
Liberal Democrats	Ben Powell	556	14	0%
Green	Norman Pasley	325	8	n/a
Labour	James Sebley	315	8	▼8%
Majority				
Turnout		4,014		
Conservative hold		Swing		

Fareham Titchfield
Party	Candidate	Votes	%	±%
Conservative	Geoffrey Hockley*	3,270	73	▲22%
Liberal Democrats	Martin Francis	728	16	▲8%
Labour	Michael Prior	502	11	0%
Majority				
Turnout		4,500		
Conservative hold		Swing		

No Independent candidate (-29) as previous.

Fareham Town (2)
Party	Candidate	Votes	%	±%
Conservative	Frederick Birkett	4,183	57	
Conservative	Peter Latham*	3,721	51	
Liberal Democrats	Shaun Cunningham	1,846	25	
Liberal Democrats	John Kelly	1,432	20	
Labour	Andrew Mooney	928	13	
Labour	Richard Ryan	789	11	
Green	Dilys Harrison	547	7	
Green	David Harrison	523	7	
Turnout		7,359		
Conservative hold		Swing		
Conservative hold		Swing		

No UKIP candidates (-29) as previous.

Fareham Warsash
Party	Candidate	Votes	%	±%
Conservative	Keith Evans*	3,829	74	▲14%
Liberal Democrats	James Palmer	456	9	▲4%
Labour	James Carr	387	7	0%
Green	Miles Grindey	264	5	▼1%
UKIP	Anthony Blewett	240	5	▼17%
Majority				
Turnout		5,176		
Conservative hold		Swing		

=== Gosport (5 seats) ===
Gosport

Bridgemary
Party	Candidate	Votes	%	±%
Conservative	Stephen Philpott	2,055	47	
Liberal Democrats	Stephen Hammond	1,261	29	
Labour	Alan Durrant	633	15	
UKIP	Stephen Thomas	308	7	
Green	Nancy Hurworth	98	2	
Majority		794		
Turnout		4,355	46.3	+0.9
Conservative gain from Labour		Swing		

No BNP candidate as previous (-1).

Hardway
Party	Candidate	Votes	%	±%
Liberal Democrats	Peter Chegwyn*	2,049	52	
Conservative	Piers Batemn	1,525	39	
Labour	James Fox	356	9	
Majority		524		
Turnout		3,930	31	
Liberal Democrats hold		Swing		

No UKIP candidate as previous (-15).

Lee
Party	Candidate	Votes	%	±%
Conservative	Graham Burgess*	2,892	71	
Labour	Jill Whitcher	387	10	
Liberal Democrats	Sean Evans	339	8	
UKIP	Stan Seymour	278	7	
Green	Peter Hurworth	152	4	
Majority		2505		
Turnout		4,048	32	
Conservative hold		Swing		

Leesland and Town (2)
Party	Candidate	Votes	%	±%
Conservative	Peter Edgar*	4,756	59	
Conservative	Chris Carter*	4,353	54	
Liberal Democrats	Robert Hylands	1,501	19	
Liberal Democrats	Stephen Marshall	1,203	15	
Labour	Mark Smith	984	12	
Labour	Charis Noakes	969	12	
UKIP	David Foster	652	8	
UKIP	John Bowles	625	8	
Green	David Sekules	444	6	
Turnout		8,057	35	
Conservative hold		Swing		
Conservative hold		Swing		

No BNP candidate as previous (-3).

=== Hart (5 seats) ===
Hart

Church Crookham & Ewshot
Party	Candidate	Votes	%	±%
CCH	John Bennison	3,055	55	
Conservative	Stephen Gorys	1,787	32	
Labour	Clive Astin	324	6	
Green	Chas Spradbery	188	3	
UKIP	Dawn Moors	176	3	
Majority		1268		
Turnout		5530	39	
CCH hold		Swing		

Fleet Town
Party	Candidate	Votes	%	±%
Conservative	Steve Forster	2,735	48	
CCH	Alan Oliver	2,227	39	
Labour	Sam Butler	483	9	
UKIP	Alan Langridge	155	3	
Monster Raving Loony	Howling Laud Hope	78	1	
Majority		508		
Turnout		5678	40	
Conservative win (new seat)				

Hartley Wintney & Yateley West
Party	Candidate	Votes	%	±%
Liberal Democrats	David Simpson	2,846	47	
Conservative	Tim Davies	2,530	42	
Green	Ruth Jarman	231	4	
Labour	Joyce Still	218	4	
UKIP	John Howe	186	3	
Majority		316		
Turnout		6011	40	
Liberal Democrats win (new seat)				

Odiham & Hook
Party	Candidate	Votes	%	±%
Conservative	Jonathan Glen	3,201	69	
Liberal Democrats	Graham Cockarill	573	12	
Labour	Amanda Affleck-Cruise	416	9	
Green	Graham Stacey	243	5	
UKIP	Kevin Oliver	212	5	
Majority		2628		
Turnout		4645	37	
Conservative win (new seat)				

Yateley East and Blackwater
Party	Candidate	Votes	%	±%
Liberal Democrats	Adrian Collett	3,304	60	
Conservative	Shawn Dickens	1,648	30	
Labour	Amy Cullen	251	5	
UKIP	Mike Gascoigne	186	3	
Green	Frank Gantley	124	2	
Majority		1656		
Turnout		5513	37	
Liberal Democrats hold		Swing		

=== Havant (7 seats) ===
Havant

Cowplain and Hart Plain
Party	Candidate	Votes	%	±%
Conservative	David Keast	2,539	70	
Labour	Howard Sherlock	401	11	
Liberal Democrats	Fiona Drinan	355	10	
UKIP	John Picard	198	5	
Green	Bruce Holman	153	4	
Majority		2138		
Turnout		3646	30	
Conservative hold		Swing		

Emsworth and St. Faiths
Party	Candidate	Votes	%	±%
Conservative	Ray Bolton	3,299	59	
Liberal Democrats	Crispin War	820	15	
Labour	Munazza Faiz	613	11	
Green	Sue Dawes	492	9	
UKIP	John Davis	338	6	
Majority		2479		
Turnout		5562	41	
Conservative hold		Swing		

Hayling Island
Party	Candidate	Votes	%	±%
Conservative	Lance Quantrill	3,186	60	
UKIP	Richard Coates	764	14	
Labour	Sheree Earnshaw	593	11	
Liberal Democrats	Paul Gray	526	10	
Green	Sue Holt	255	5	
BNP	John Moore	30	1	
Majority		2422		
Turnout		5354	37	
Conservative hold		Swing		

North East Havant
Party	Candidate	Votes	%	±%
Conservative	Jackie Branson	1,304	44	
Labour	Phil Munday	655	22	
Liberal Democrats	Faith Ponsonby	559	19	
UKIP	Malc Carpenter	368	12	
Green	Richard Lancaster	108	4	
Majority		649		
Turnout		2994	21	
Conservative gain from New Ward		Swing		

North West Havant
Party	Candidate	Votes	%	±%
Conservative	Liz Fairhurst	2,095	54	
Liberal Democrats	Philippa Gray	949	25	
Labour	Phil Pearson	442	11	
UKIP	Dave Walbridge	260	7	
Green	Terry Mithcell	119	3	
Majority		1146		
Turnout		3865	26	
Conservative gain from New Ward		Swing		

Purbrook & Stakes South
Party	Candidate	Votes	%	±%
Conservative	Gary Hughes	2,088	63	
Labour	Anthony Martin	497	15	
UKIP	Andy Boxall	288	9	
Liberal Democrats	Ann Bazley	282	8	
Green	Rosie Blackburn	178	5	
Majority		1591		
Turnout		3333	26	
Conservative hold		Swing		

Waterloo & Stakes North
Party	Candidate	Votes	%	±%
Conservative	Ann Briggs	2,842	72	
Labour	Anthony Berry	493	13	
Liberal Democrats	Catherine Billam	398	10	
Green	Tim Dawes	196	5	
Majority		2349		
Turnout		3929	30	
Conservative hold		Swing		

=== New Forest (10 seats) ===
New Forest

Brockenhurst
Party	Candidate	Votes	%	±%
Conservative	Keith Mans	3,526	62	
Liberal Democrats	Ruth Rollin	1,338	23	
Labour	Brian Curwain	297	5	
UKIP	Margaret Bailey	286	5	
Green	Henry Mellor	279	5	
Majority		2188		
Turnout		5726	39	
Conservative hold		Swing		

Dibden and Hythe
Party	Candidate	Votes	%	±%
Liberal Democrats	Malcolm Wade	2,660	46	
Conservative	James Binns	2,202	38	
Independent	Chris Harrison	546	10	
Labour	Julie Renyard	330	6	
Majority		458		
Turnout		5738	40	
Liberal Democrats hold		Swing		

Lymington & Boldre
Party	Candidate	Votes	%	±%
Conservative	Michael White	2,645	51	
Independent	Jacqui England	1,300	25	
Liberal Democrats	Jack Davies	815	16	
Labour	Maggie Humphreys	242	5	
Green	Timothy Rowe	162	3	
Majority		1345		
Turnout		5164	37	
Conservative gain from New Ward		Swing		

Lyndhurst & Fordingbridge
Party	Candidate	Votes	%	±%
Conservative	Edward Heron	3,506	64	
Liberal Democrats	Alexi Sugden	1,131	21	
Green	Janet Richards	460	8	
Labour	John Haywood	345	6	
TUSC	Jane Ward	61	1	
Majority		2375		
Turnout		5503	38	
Conservative gain from New Ward boundaries		Swing		

New Milton
Party	Candidate	Votes	%	±%
Conservative	Mel Kendal	3,226	66	
UKIP	Paul Bailey	647	13	
Liberal Democrats	Mark Clark	467	10	
Labour	Caroline Hexter	435	9	
Pirate	Des Hjerling	108	2	
Majority		2579		
Turnout		4883	35	
Conservative hold		Swing		

New Milton North, Milford & Hordle
Party	Candidate	Votes	%	±%
Conservative	Fran Carpenter	4,114	77	
Liberal Democrats	Wynford Davies	779	15	
Labour	Peter Terry	258	9	
Majority		3335		
Turnout		5351	36	
Conservative gain from New Ward		Swing		

Ringwood
Party	Candidate	Votes	%	±%
Conservative	Michael Thierry	2,502	61	
Liberal Democrats	Tom Cornwall	754	18	
Labour	Peter Kelleher	521	13	
Green	Julian Konczak	316	8	
Majority		1748		
Turnout		4093	32	
Conservative win (new seat)				

South Waterside
Party	Candidate	Votes	%	±%
Conservative	Alexis McEvoy	2,404	66	
Liberal Democrats	Lorraine Monaghan	683	19	
Labour	Pete Dance	354	10	
Green	John Pemberton	200	5	
Majority		1721		
Turnout		3641	29	
Conservative gain from UKIP		Swing		

Totton North
Party	Candidate	Votes	%	±%
Conservative	Neville Penman	2,669	63	
Liberal Democrats	Caroline Rackham	1,057	25	
Labour	Alan Goodfellow	498	12	
Majority		1612		
Turnout		4224	29	
Conservative gain from UKIP		Swing		

Totton South and Marchwood
Party	Candidate	Votes	%	±%
Liberal Democrats	David Harrison	2,631	57	
Conservative	Len Harris	1,632	36	
Labour	Kevin McCartney	332	7	
Majority		999		
Turnout		4585	33	
Liberal Democrats hold		Swing		

=== Rushmoor (5 seats) ===
Rushmoor

Aldershot North
Party	Candidate	Votes	%	±%
Conservative	Charles Choudhary	1,336	44	
Labour	Terry Bridgeman	1,079	36	
UKIP	Kevin Betsworth	374	12	
Liberal Democrats	Abu Koher	244	8	
Majority		257		
Turnout		3033	28	
Conservative hold		Swing		

Aldershot South
Party	Candidate	Votes	%	±%
Conservative	Bill Withers	1,624	42	
Labour	Frank Rust	1,621	42	
UKIP	Len Amos	272	7	
Liberal Democrats	Craig Card	194	5	
Green	Gary Simpson	148	4	
Majority		3		
Turnout		3859	29	
Conservative hold		Swing		

Farnborough North
Party	Candidate	Votes	%	±%
Conservative	Roz Chadd	1,935	46	
Labour	Clive Grattan	1,120	27	
UKIP	Dave Bell	723	17	
Liberal Democrats	Leola Card	425	10	
Majority		815		
Turnout		4203	31	
Conservative hold		Swing		

Farnborough South
Party	Candidate	Votes	%	±%
Conservative	Roland Dibbs	2,193	47	
Liberal Democrats	Abul Chowdhury	900	19	
Labour	Colin Southon	575	12	
Independent	John Wall	433	9	
Green	Donna Wallace	336	7	
UKIP	Chris Harding	237	5	
Majority		1293		
Turnout		4674	33	
Conservative hold		Swing	−15.69	

Farnborough West
Party	Candidate	Votes	%	±%
Conservative	Rod Cooper	2,168	47	
UKIP	Mark Staplehurst	1,167	26	
Labour	Sue Gadsby	587	13	
Liberal Democrats	Alain Dekker	457	10	
Green	Peta Howell	189	4	
Majority		1001		
Turnout		4568	33	
Conservative gain from UKIP		Swing		

=== Test Valley (7 seats) ===
Test Valley

Andover North
Party	Candidate	Votes	%	±%
Conservative	Kirsty Marie	1,971	56	
Liberal Democrats	Katherine Bird	1,031	29	
UKIP	Timothy Rolt	538	15	
Majority		940		
Turnout		3540	29	
Conservative gain from UKIP		Swing		

Andover South
Party	Candidate	Votes	%	±%
Conservative	Martin Boiles	2,389	52	
Liberal Democrats	Richard Rowles	852	18	
Labour	Felicity Thorpe-Tracey	523	11	
Independent	Tony Hooke	329	7	
UKIP	Daniel Emmerson	280	6	
Green	Catherine Hosen	243	5	
Majority		1537		
Turnout		4616	33	
Conservative gain from UKIP		Swing		

Andover West
Party	Candidate	Votes	%	±%
Conservative	Zilliah Brooks	2,745	56	
Liberal Democrats	Luigi Gregori	970	20	
Labour	Andy Fitchet	714	15	
UKIP	Norman Woods	488	10	
Majority		1775		
Turnout		4917	34	
Conservative hold		Swing		

Baddesley
Party	Candidate	Votes	%	±%
Liberal Democrats	Alan Dowden	3,205	59	
Conservative	Roger Curtis	1,900	35	
Labour	Amanda Ford	337	6	
Majority		1305		
Turnout		5442	42	
Liberal Democrats hold		Swing		

Romsey Rural
Party	Candidate	Votes	%	±%
Conservative	Roy Perry	3,653	66	
Liberal Democrats	Catherine Royce	1,440	26	
Labour	Heather Butler	379	7	
JAC	Don Jerrard	105	2	
Majority		2213		
Turnout		5577	40	
Conservative win (new seat)				

Romsey Town
Party	Candidate	Votes	%	±%
Liberal Democrats	Mark Cooper	3,272	56	
Conservative	Simon Hayes	2,161	37	
Labour	Stuart Bannerman	363	6	
Majority		1111		
Turnout		5796	44	
Liberal Democrats win (new seat)				

Test Valley Central
Party	Candidate	Votes	%	±%
Conservative	Andrew Gibson	3,719	68	
Liberal Democrats	Harry Paul	1,067	20	
Green	Carol Bartholomew	384	7	−12.37
Labour	David Stevens	284	5	
Majority		2652		
Turnout		5454	39	
Conservative hold		Swing		

=== Winchester (7 seats) ===
Winchester

Bishops Waltham
Party	Candidate	Votes	%	±%
Conservative	Rob Humby	3,657	63	
Liberal Democrats	Lewis North	1,301	23	
Green	Victoria Jones	425	7	
Labour	Steve Haines	398	7	
Majority		2356		
Turnout		5791	43	
Conservative hold		Swing		

Itchen Valley
Party	Candidate	Votes	%	±%
Liberal Democrats	Jackie Porter	3,558	55	
Conservative	Ernest Jeffs	2,617	40	
Green	Chris Hesketh-Roberts	190	3	
Labour	Richard James	157	2	
Majority		941		
Turnout		6522	51	
Liberal Democrats hold		Swing		

Meon Valley
Party	Candidate	Votes	%	±%
Conservative	Roger Huxstep	2,925	58	
Liberal Democrats	Vivian Achwal	1,509	30	
Green	Anne Coleman	217	4	
Labour	Anne West	208	4	
UKIP	Leslie Mitchell	163	3	
Majority		1416		
Turnout		5033	42	
Conservative gain from New Ward boundaries		Swing		

Winchester Downlands
Party	Candidate	Votes	%	±%
Conservative	Jan Warwick	3,524	49	
Liberal Democrats	Eleanor Bell	3,087	43	
Labour	Catherine Hutchinson	304	4	
Green	Max Priesemann	289	4	
Majority		437		
Turnout		7204	50	
Conservative gain from Liberal Democrats		Swing		

Winchester Eastgate
Party	Candidate	Votes	%	±%
Liberal Democrats	Dominic Hiscock	2,424	44	
Conservative	Fiona Mather	2,071	37	
Labour	Janet Berry	606	11	
Green	Andrew Wainwright	407	7	
JAC	Teresa Skelton	50	1	
Majority		353		
Turnout		5558	46	
Liberal Democrats gain from Conservative		Swing		

Winchester Southern Parishes
Party	Candidate	Votes	%	±%
Conservative	Patricia Stallard	3,011	71	
Liberal Democrats	Simon Wernick	796	19	
Labour	Alexander Graft	240	6	
Green	Dave Walker-Nix	210	5	
Majority		2215		
Turnout		4257	36	
Conservative hold		Swing		

Winchester Westgate
Party	Candidate	Votes	%	±%
Liberal Democrats	Martin Tod	2,748	52	
Conservative	Ian Tait	1,977	37	
Labour	Jack Moran	332	6	
Green	Kia Pope	223	4	
Majority		771		
Turnout		5280	47	
Liberal Democrats hold		Swing		
