= 2004 Hart District Council election =

2004 UK local government election

← 2003	10 June 2004	2006 →

12 of 35 seats to Hart District Council 18 seats needed for a majority
	First party	Second party	Third party
Party	Conservative	Liberal Democrats	CCH
Seats before	22	10	New party
Seats after	18	12	2
Popular vote	8,543	5,837	2,821
Percentage	45.5%	31.1%	15.0%
- Results by Ward
Council control before election
Conservative
Council control after election
Conservative

The 2004 Hart Council election took place on 10 June 2004 to elect members of Hart District Council in Hampshire, England. One third of the council was up for election and the Conservative Party stayed in overall control of the council.

After the election, the composition of the council was:

- Conservative 18
- Liberal Democrat 12
- Independent 3
- Community Campaign (Hart) 2

== Campaign ==
In early May 2004 the Conservative leader of the council, Lorraine Fullbrook, resigned as a councillor in order to stand for the seat of South Ribble in the 2005 general election. This meant an extra seat in Church Crookham West would be contested in the local elections.

The election saw the Conservatives challenged by a new Community Campaign (Hart) group as well as from the main political parties. The group had been formed in 2003 in protest against plans to develop a barracks in Church Crookham.

== Election results ==
The results saw the Conservatives stay in control of the council despite losing 2 seats to the new Community Campaign (Hart) group and 1 seat to the Liberal Democrats. Community Campaign (Hart) gained the seats of Church Crookham East and West and came second in two additional wards. Meanwhile, the Liberal Democrats gained Fleet Courtmoor from the Conservatives, while holding the other 4 seats they had been defending. However the Conservatives did manage to gain one seat in Crondall, where they defeated Brian Leversha who had resigned from the Conservatives to sit as an Independent.

Meanwhile, no Independents were successful in being elected with former councillor Peter Carr coming closest after losing by 66 votes. The other candidates from the Labour Party, British National Party and Official Monster Raving Loony Party each failed to get more than 200 votes.

Hart local election result 2004
Party	Seats	Gains	Losses	Net gain/loss	Seats %	Votes %	Votes	+/−
Conservative	5	1	3	-2	41.7	45.5	8,543	-6.3
Liberal Democrats	5	1	0	+1	41.7	31.3	5,837	-12.7
CCH	2	2	0	+2	16.7	15.0	2,821	+15.0
Independent	0	0	1	-1	0.0	5.4	1,023	+5.4
Labour	0	0	0	0	0.0	1.5	287	-1.5
BNP	0	0	0	0	0.0	1.1	198	+1.1
Monster Raving Loony	0	0	0	0	0.0	0.4	80	+0.4

== Ward results ==
=== Blackwater and Hawley ===
Blackwater and Hawley
Party	Candidate	Votes	%	±%
Liberal Democrats	Brian Blewett	921	60.0	+9.3
Conservative	Vivienne Gascoigne	562	36.6	−12.7
Labour	Joyce Still	53	3.5	+3.5
Majority		359	23.4	+21.9
Turnout		1,536	44.4	+12.5
Liberal Democrats hold		Swing		

=== Church Crookham East ===
Church Crookham East
Party	Candidate	Votes	%	±%
CCH	Edward Radley	907	55.2	
Conservative	Deborah Moss	735	44.8	
Majority		172	10.4	
Turnout		1,642	43.7	+10.8
CCH gain from Conservative		Swing		

=== Church Crookham West ===
Church Crookham West
Party	Candidate	Votes	%	±%
CCH	Jennifer Radley	921	63.6	+63.6
Conservative	Sara-Lea Kinnell	528	36.4	−19.1
Majority		393	27.2	
Turnout		1,449	36.0	+7.7
CCH gain from Conservative		Swing		

=== Crondall ===
Crondall
Party	Candidate	Votes	%	±%
Conservative	Pritpal Singh	671	50.0	
CCH	John Benson	405	30.2	
Independent	Brian Leversha	266	19.8	
Majority		266	19.8	
Turnout		1,342	44.8	
Conservative gain from Independent		Swing		

=== Fleet Central ===
Fleet Central
Party	Candidate	Votes	%	±%
Conservative	Alan Pearson	823	52.1	
Independent	Peter Carr	757	47.9	
Majority		66	4.2	
Turnout		1,580	39.4	+8.0
Conservative hold		Swing		

=== Fleet Courtmoor ===
Fleet Courtmoor
Party	Candidate	Votes	%	±%
Liberal Democrats	Paul Einchcomb	848	51.1	+10.6
Conservative	Ernest Jasper	812	48.9	−10.6
Majority		36	2.2	
Turnout		1,660	43.8	+13.9
Liberal Democrats gain from Conservative		Swing		

=== Fleet Pondtail ===
Fleet Pondtail
Party	Candidate	Votes	%	±%
Liberal Democrats	Susan Fisher	1,192	68.5	
Conservative	Andrew Davies	549	31.5	
Majority		643	37.0	
Turnout		1,741	47.5	+13.9
Liberal Democrats hold		Swing		

=== Fleet West ===
Fleet West
Party	Candidate	Votes	%	±%
Conservative	Sean Holden	762	49.5	
CCH	Stephen Cantle	515	33.5	
Liberal Democrats	Geoffrey Donkin	262	17.0	
Majority		247	16.0	
Turnout		1,539	41.4	+11.4
Conservative hold		Swing		

=== Hook ===
Hook
Party	Candidate	Votes	%	±%
Conservative	Michael Haffey	1,211	56.5	−8.2
Liberal Democrats	David Evans	733	34.2	+3.5
BNP	Roger Robertson	198	9.2	+9.2
Majority		478	22.3	−11.7
Turnout		2,142	37.7	+11.3
Conservative hold		Swing		

=== Odiham ===
Odiham
Party	Candidate	Votes	%	±%
Conservative	Stephen Gorys	1,031	70.9	−5.8
Liberal Democrats	Anthony Over	351	24.1	+0.8
CCH	Craig Hartwell	73	5.0	+5.0
Majority		680	46.7	−6.7
Turnout		1,455	42.1	+4.3
Conservative hold		Swing		

=== Yateley East ===
Yateley East
Party	Candidate	Votes	%	±%
Liberal Democrats	Stuart Bailey	784	55.6	−0.9
Conservative	Thomas Schwartz	438	31.1	−3.9
Labour	David Jenkins	107	7.6	−0.8
Monster Raving Loony	Alan Hope	80	5.7	+5.7
Majority		346	24.6	+3.1
Turnout		1,409	34.6	+5.9
Liberal Democrats hold		Swing		

=== Yateley West ===
Yateley West
Party	Candidate	Votes	%	±%
Liberal Democrats	Alan Hammersley	746	57.7	−1.8
Conservative	Edward Bromhead	421	32.5	+5.4
Labour	John Davies	127	9.8	−0.9
Majority		325	25.1	−7.3
Turnout		1,294	33.0	+10.8
Liberal Democrats hold		Swing		

Preceded by 2003 Hart Council election	Hart local elections	Succeeded by 2006 Hart Council election
