= 2008 Hart District Council election =

2008 UK local government election

← 2007	1 May 2008	2010 →

12 of 35 seats to Hart District Council 18 seats needed for a majority
	First party	Second party	Third party
Party	Conservative	Liberal Democrats	CCH
Seats before	15	12	6
Seats won	8	3	1
Seats after	17	10	6
Popular vote	10,021	4,795	1,459
Percentage	60.1%	28.7%	8.7%
- Results by Ward
Council control before election
No overall control
Council control after election
No overall control

The 2008 Hart Council election took place on 1 May 2008 to elect members of Hart District Council in Hampshire, England. One third of the council was up for election and the council stayed under no overall control, with the Conservatives as the largest party.

After the election, the composition of the council was:

- Conservative 17
- Liberal Democrat 10
- Community Campaign (Hart) 6
- Independent 2

== Campaign ==
12 seats were being contested in the election with the Conservatives defending 6 seats, the Liberal Democrats 5 and the Community Campaign (Hart) 1 seat. In total there were 30 candidates standing in the election with the Conservatives the only party to stand in all of the seats. Other candidates included 10 from the Liberal Democrats, 5 from Labour, 2 Community Campaign (Hart) and 1 from the British National Party. Before the election a coalition of the Liberal Democrats, Community Campaign (Hart) and the 2 Independents ran the council with the Conservatives forming the opposition.

Issues in the election included facilities for teenagers, cleaner streets, recycling and reducing crime. The Conservatives wanted to improve the value for money the council produced, develop the infrastructure for new housing and to keep roads in good condition. However the Liberal Democrats pledged to improve recycling, get more affordable housing and keep crime levels low.

During the campaign the national Conservative leader, David Cameron, visited the area to campaign for the party.

== Election results ==
The results saw the council remain with no party having a majority, but with the Conservatives gaining 2 seats to hold 17 of the 35 seats. Both Conservative gains came from the Liberal Democrats, taking Fleet Courtmoor by 391 votes and Fleet Pondtail by 493 votes. The Conservatives won 60% of the vote and claimed a mandate to take control of the council. However the 2 independents held the balance of power between the Conservatives and the Liberal Democrat/Community Campaign (Hart) alliance. Overall turnout in the election was 36.9%.

At the annual council meeting after the election the Conservatives took control of the council. Their leader Ken Crookes won 18 votes compared to 17 for Liberal Democrat leader David Neighbour, with 1 of the 2 independents, Susan Band, backing the Conservatives. The other independent, Denis Gotel, and the Community Campaign (Hart) backed the Liberal Democrat leader. As a result, the council cabinet was made up of all Conservatives, except for independent Susan Band who would continue to be responsible for housing and health.

Hart local election result 2008
Party	Seats	Gains	Losses	Net gain/loss	Seats %	Votes %	Votes	+/−
Conservative	8	2	0	+2	66.7	60.1	10,021	+9.3
Liberal Democrats	3	0	2	-2	25.0	28.7	4,795	-4.3
CCH	1	0	0	0	8.3	8.7	1,459	-1.9
Labour	0	0	0	0	0.0	2.0	327	-0.9
BNP	0	0	0	0	0.0	0.5	84	-1.9

== Ward results ==
=== Blackwater and Hawley ===
Blackwater and Hawley
Party	Candidate	Votes	%	±%
Liberal Democrats	Brian Blewett	669	61.3	+3.9
Conservative	Richard Fielden	423	38.7	−3.9
Majority		246	22.5	+7.7
Turnout		1,092	32.2	−10.7
Liberal Democrats hold		Swing		

=== Church Crookham East ===
Church Crookham East
Party	Candidate	Votes	%	±%
CCH	James Radley	942	66.4	+11.6
Conservative	Debbie Moss	476	33.6	−6.1
Majority		466	32.9	+17.8
Turnout		1,418	37.8	−5.6
CCH hold		Swing		

=== Crondall ===
Crondall
Party	Candidate	Votes	%	±%
Conservative	Nippy Singh	804	60.9	+11.0
CCH	Chris Hannan	517	39.1	−11.0
Majority		287	21.8	
Turnout		1,321	43.4	+3.1
Conservative hold		Swing		

=== Fleet Central ===
Fleet Central
Party	Candidate	Votes	%	±%
Conservative	Christopher Hunt	1,040	72.1	+26.1
Liberal Democrats	Richard Robinson	335	23.2	+23.2
Labour	David Jenkins	68	4.7	−1.7
Majority		705	48.9	
Turnout		1,443	34.1	−3.6
Conservative hold		Swing		

=== Fleet Courtmoor ===
Fleet Courtmoor
Party	Candidate	Votes	%	±%
Conservative	Christopher Butler	1,113	58.6	+14.4
Liberal Democrats	Paul Einchcomb	722	38.0	+38.0
Labour	Ruth Williams	65	3.4	−1.7
Majority		391	20.6	
Turnout		1,900	51.3	+5.2
Conservative gain from Liberal Democrats		Swing		

=== Fleet Pondtail ===
Fleet Pondtail
Party	Candidate	Votes	%	±%
Conservative	David Healey	1,211	62.8	+15.9
Liberal Democrats	Sue Fisher	718	37.2	−5.8
Majority		493	25.6	+21.7
Turnout		1,929	53.1	−1.0
Conservative gain from Liberal Democrats		Swing		

=== Fleet West ===
Fleet West
Party	Candidate	Votes	%	±%
Conservative	Tim Davies	1,005	77.2	
Liberal Democrats	Sarah Horton	227	17.4	
Labour	Janet Young	70	5.4	
Majority		778	59.8	
Turnout		1,302	34.2	−4.9
Conservative hold		Swing		

=== Hook ===
Hook
Party	Candidate	Votes	%	±%
Conservative	Michael Haffey	1,515	78.3	+6.4
Liberal Democrats	Penny Potts	419	21.7	−6.4
Majority		1,096	56.7	+13.0
Turnout		1,934	31.0	−2.3
Conservative hold		Swing		

=== Long Sutton ===
Long Sutton
Party	Candidate	Votes	%	±%
Conservative	John Kennett	467	82.2	+11.0
Liberal Democrats	Roger Carter	101	17.8	+3.3
Majority		366	64.4	+7.7
Turnout		568	31.2	−5.3
Conservative hold		Swing		

=== Odiham ===
Odiham
Party	Candidate	Votes	%	±%
Conservative	Stephen Gorys	1,067	78.5	−5.1
Liberal Democrats	Chris Griffin	293	21.5	+5.1
Majority		774	56.9	−10.3
Turnout		1,360	37.1	−3.8
Conservative hold		Swing		

=== Yateley East ===
Yateley East
Party	Candidate	Votes	%	±%
Liberal Democrats	Stuart Bailey	722	57.9	+0.9
Conservative	Sue Perkins	478	38.4	+2.5
Labour	John Davies	46	3.7	−3.4
Majority		244	19.6	−1.4
Turnout		1,246	31.2	−1.4
Liberal Democrats hold		Swing		

=== Yateley West ===
Yateley West
Party	Candidate	Votes	%	±%
Liberal Democrats	David Murr	589	50.2	+4.9
Conservative	Sue Dunning	422	36.0	+7.8
BNP	Geoffrey Crompton	84	7.2	−7.8
Labour	Joyce Still	78	6.6	−5.0
Majority		167	14.2	−2.9
Turnout		1,173	30.4	−1.1
Liberal Democrats hold		Swing		

Preceded by 2007 Hart Council election	Hart local elections	Succeeded by 2010 Hart Council election
