= 2010 Hart District Council election =

2010 UK local government election

← 2008	6 May 2010	2011 →

12 of 35 seats to Hart District Council 18 seats needed for a majority
	First party	Second party	Third party
Party	Conservative	Liberal Democrats	CCH
Seats before	17	10	6
Seats won	8	2	2
Seats after	20	10	5
Seat change	▲3	Steady	▼1
Popular vote	18,293	9,514	4,773
Percentage	53.3%	27.7%	13.9%
- Results by Ward
Council control before election
No overall control
Council control after election
Conservative

The 2010 Hart District Council election took place on 6 May 2010, on the same day as the United Kingdom General Election. One third of the council was up for re-election, the Conservatives gained three seats, one from Community Campaign Hart and the two independent seats, whilst the Liberal Democrats remained on 10 seats. With an increase from 17 seats to 20, the Conservatives gained a majority and administration of the council, which had been under no overall control since 2005. After the election, the composition of the council was:

- Conservative: 20
- Liberal Democrats: 10
- Community Campaign (Hart): 5

== Election results ==
The Conservatives had last been in administration between 2000 and 2005, with the council remaining under no overall control until this election, albeit with the Conservatives remaining as the largest party. The 2010 election saw the Conservatives gain three seats, the Crondall seat from Community Campaign Hart, and Fleet Central and Hartley Wintney from independent councillors, whilst the Liberal Democrats made no gains or losses. As such, the Conservatives gained an overall majority of the council with 20 councillors.

Hart local election result 2010
Party	Seats	Gains	Losses	Net gain/loss	Seats %	Votes %	Votes	+/−
Conservative	8	3	0	▲3		53.3	18,293	
Liberal Democrats	2	0	0	Steady		27.7	9,514	
CCH	1	0	1	▼1		13.9	4,773	
Independent	0	0	2	▼2		3.3	1,129	
Labour	0	0	0	Steady		1.3	436	
Monster Raving Loony	0	0	0	Steady		0.5	169	

== Ward results ==
=== Church Crookham East ===
Church Crookham East
Party	Candidate	Votes	%	±%
CCH	Gill Butler	1,805	66.8	
Conservative	Brian Burchfield	896	33.2	
Majority		909		
Turnout		2,701		
CCH hold		Swing		

=== Church Crookham West ===
Church Crookham West
Party	Candidate	Votes	%	±%
CCH	Simon Ambler	1,909	65.3	
Conservative	James Pugmore	1,016	34.7	
Majority		893		
Turnout		2,925		
CCH hold		Swing		

=== Crondall ===
Crondall
Party	Candidate	Votes	%	±%
Conservative	Chris Simmons	1,144	51.9	
CCH	John Bennison	1,059	48.1	
Majority		85		
Turnout		2,203		
Conservative gain from CCH		Swing		

=== Fleet Central ===
Fleet Central
Party	Candidate	Votes	%	±%
Conservative	Gavin Evans	1,768	57.7	
Independent	Denis Gotel	1,129	36.8	
Monster Raving Loony	Howling Laud Hope	169	5.5	
Majority		639		
Turnout		3,066		
Conservative gain from Independent		Swing		

=== Fleet North ===
Fleet North
Party	Candidate	Votes	%	±%
Conservative	Stephen Parker	2,312	63.1	
Liberal Democrats	Mariken van Dolen	1,350	36.9	
Majority		962		
Turnout		3,662		
Conservative hold		Swing		

=== Fleet Pondtail ===
Fleet Pondtail
Party	Candidate	Votes	%	±%
Conservative	Sharyn Wheale	1,922	69.6	
Liberal Democrats	Jane Baker	838	30.4	
Majority		1,084		
Turnout		1,930		
Conservative hold		Swing		

=== Fleet West ===
Fleet West
Party	Candidate	Votes	%	±%
Conservative	Richard Appleton	1,761	64.1	
Liberal Democrats	Richard Robinson	986	35.9	
Majority		775		
Turnout		2,747		
Conservative hold		Swing		

=== Frogmore and Darby Green ===
Frogmore and Darby Green
Party	Candidate	Votes	%	±%
Liberal Democrats	Bob Harward	1,802	62.0	
Conservative	Eddie Bromhead	867	29.8	
Labour	John Davies	239	8.2	
Majority		935		
Turnout		2,908		
Liberal Democrats hold		Swing		

=== Hartley Wintney ===
Hartley Wintney
Party	Candidate	Votes	%	±%
Conservative	Tim Southern	1,572	54.0	
Liberal Democrats	Graham Bartlett	1,339	46.0	
Majority		233		
Turnout		2,911		
Conservative gain from Independent		Swing		

=== Hook ===
Hook
Party	Candidate	Votes	%	±%
Conservative	Jonathan Glen	2,935	65.3	
Liberal Democrats	Kulwant Lit	1,559	21.7	
Majority		4,494		
Turnout		4,494		
Conservative hold		Swing		

=== Long Sutton ===
Long Sutton
Party	Candidate	Votes	%	±%
Conservative	John Kennett	871	69.5	
Liberal Democrats	Anthony Over	382	30.5	
Majority		489		
Turnout		1,253		
Conservative hold		Swing		

=== Yateley North ===
Yateley North
Party	Candidate	Votes	%	±%
Liberal Democrats	Colin Ive	1,258	46.9	
Conservative	Richard Fielden	1,229	45.8	
Labour	Joyce Still	197	7.3	
Majority		29		
Turnout		2,684		
Liberal Democrats hold		Swing		
