= Community Campaign (Hart) =

- Leader: James Radley
- Founded: 2003
- Ideology: Localism
- Colours: Purple and White
- Slogan: Local Politics - It's about where you live
- Hampshire county council (Hart seats) (Note: There are 78 seats in Hampshire County Council, with five single-member wards in the Hart district): 1 / 5
- Hart District council seats: 11 / 33

Website
- cchart.co.uk
- Politics of the United Kingdom; Political parties; Elections; Location of Hart District:

Community Campaign (Hart) (CCH) is a minor localist political party based in the district of Hart in the north east of Hampshire. Founded in 2003, it has contested both district and county elections within Hart, and has successfully gained representation in both the district council and county council, and has formed part of the district council administration. CCH is one of several successful independent groups in Hampshire, with both the Isle of Wight Council and Basingstoke and Deane also being administered by independents.

The first CCH councillors were elected in 2004, with numbers increasing over the next few years; as of 2026 there are 11. The party is in administration of the council in coalition with the Liberal Democrats since 2017, with 24 seats between them out of 33. Councillor James Radley is Deputy Leader of the council, also holding portfolio for Finance.

== History ==
Community Campaign Hart was formed at a meeting in 2003 attended by several local councillors, with an election strategy meeting taking place before the 2004 local elections. In the subsequent 2004 district council election, CCH candidates stood in five seats, gaining two (Church Crookham East and Church Crookham West) from the Conservatives, achieving 15% of the overall vote. In the 2006 election 3 new councillors were elected in Church Crookham East and Crondall, with another councillor elected in 2007 to the Fleet Courtmoor ward, bringing the number of CCH Councillors to 6. James Radley successfully defended his Church Crookham East seat in 2008, but the CCH candidate for Crondall did not win the seat from the Conservative incumbent.

Whilst no candidate stood in the 2005 Hampshire County Council Election, in 2009 Jenny Radley gained the seat of Church Crookham and Ewshot from the Conservative Party, with 3,822 votes (66.54%). In the 2010 Hart District Council Election, despite the CCH vote share increasing by 5.2, CCH incumbent John Bennison lost his Crondall seat to the Conservative candidate, who received 1,144 votes (51.9%) against Bennison's 1,059 (48.1%), though two other CCH incumbents retained their seats. The vote share then fell by 2.8 in 2011, but with the two CCH seats being defended successfully.

In the 2012 election, two more councillors were elected with a vote increase of 5.3, gaining the Crondall and Fleet Courtmoor seats from the Conservative incumbents. Councillor John Bennison, who had formerly been the CCH councillor for Crondall, defended the Church Crookham and Ewshot Division ward of Hampshire County Council in 2013, as the party's sole county councillor. In 2014 the number of seats on the council was reduced by two to 33, with redefined ward boundaries; in the 2014 election, CCH won nine seats, an increase of two and with a slightly increased vote share. CCH held talks with the Conservatives and Lib Dems about forming an administration. However, in 2015, John Bennison lost his Fleet Central Seat to the Conservative candidate (whilst remaining on the County Council), but with the party subsequently successfully defending the three seats up for re-election in 2016. That December, two councillors defected from the Conservatives to CCH, citing disagreements over the Local Plan. In 2017 John Bennison defended his county council, with a slightly increased vote share. Alan Oliver of the party also stood in the Fleet Town Ward, coming second after the Conservatives with 2,227 votes (39.22%). This is out of five councillors from Hart itself, alongside two Conservatives, and two Liberal Democrats.

=== Joint administration ===
It was in June 2017. with 10 seats, that CCH joined the Liberal Democrats, on eight seats, in running the district council, with Lib Dem David Neighbour elected leader of the council and each party sharing cabinet posts equally. In 2017, a CCH-sponsored report for the district council recommended not allowing development on most council-owned brownfield land.

In the 2018 District Council election, the Angela Delaney gained Fleet West from the Conservative party with three further seats successfully defended, bringing the total number of councillors up to nine.

In the 2019 district election, two seats were successfully defended, with a further two gained from the Conservatives; the Conservatives were now the joint-largest party on the council with CCH, both on 11. Community Campaign alongside the Liberal Democrats formed a majority administration of 21 seats (out of 33 total); Liberal Democrat Councillor David Neighbour became leader of the Council, with Community Campaign Hart Leader James Radley becoming the Deputy Leader, with several CCH councillors gaining portfolio positions. A proposed garden village in Hart proved controversial on social media that year; CCH, who had been reluctant to engage on social media, said some of the comments were potentially defamatory.

Hart District Council elections were originally scheduled to occur in 2020, but due to the ongoing COVID-19 pandemic, they were delayed and held in 2021, alongside the scheduled Hampshire County Council elections. The paid garden green bin service CCH helped negotiate with Serco in 2018 was suspended in 2020 due to the pandemic. with further cancellations in 2021; CCH was unapologetic.

In the 2021 district election, CCH was the incumbent administration with the Lib Dems. Fleet Central, held by Wendy Makepeace-Browne, was gained by Mark Butcher of the Conservatives with a majority of 378 votes. CCH therefore dropped to 10 seats.

In the 2021 Hampshire County Council election John Bennison lost his county council seat, to Stephen Parker of the Conservatives, by 285 votes.

In the May 2022 district election, CCH was defending four seats and went in with 10 councillors. They held four seats in May 2023.

The 2024 district election on 2 May saw CCH and the Lib Dems gain seats from the Conservatives, with CCH back up to 11 by retaking Fleet Central.

In the 2026 County Council election, CCH retook the seat they lost in 2021 and the Conservatives lost overall control of the council. Whitehill & Bordon Community Party also held their seat. After the 2026 district elections, Radley remained deputy leader and CCH also held the vice chairship, and the Finance, Development Management, Parking Waste Services, Community Safety and Regulatory Services, and Digital and Communications portfolios.

== Electoral performance ==
CCH campaigns on local issues rather than national politics, has no national affiliation, and only stands locally to Hart.

=== District Council elections ===
Year	Votes	%	+/-	Seats	Council Control
2004	2,821	15.0%		2 / 33	Conservative
2006	2,967	15.6%	▲0.6	5 / 33	No overall control
2007	1,791	10.6%	▼5.0	6 / 33	No overall control
2008	1,459	8.7%	▼1.9	6 / 33	No overall control
2010	4,773	13.9%	▲5.2	5 / 33	Conservative
2011	2,454	11.1%	▼2.8	5 / 33	Conservative
2012	2,457	16.4%	▲5.3	7 / 33	No overall control
2014 (Note: New Ward Boundaries)	5,358	16.9%	▲0.5	9 / 33	No overall control
2015	6,745	13.4%	▼3.5	8 / 33	No overall control
2016	4,647	19.0%	▲5.6	8 / 33	No overall control
2018	5,368	20.7%	▲1.7	9 / 33	No overall control
2019	6,341	22.9%	▲2.2	11 / 33	No overall control
2021	6,163	18.7%	▼4.2	10 / 33	No overall control
2022	5,492	20.4%	▲1.7	10 / 33	No overall control
2023	4,595	17.5%	▼2.9	10 / 33	No overall control
2024	5,073	20.0%	▲2.5	11 / 33	No overall control
2026	4,948	14.33	▼5.7	11 / 33	No overall control

=== County Council elections ===
Since 2009, Community Campaign Hart has stood for council elections, standing in Church Crookham and Ewshot in all three elections since, and in Fleet Town in 2017, coming second with 2,227 votes (39.22%), behind the Conservatives with 2,735 votes (48.16%). There are five county council wards in Hart out of 78, compared to 32 district council seats.

==== 2009 ====
Church Crookham and Ewshot
Party	Candidate	Votes	%	±%
CCH	Jenny Radley	3822	66.54	
Conservative	Pritpal Singh	1744	30.88	
Labour	Jim White	148	2.58	
Majority		2048	35.66	
Turnout		5744	44.66	−21.96
CCH gain from Conservative		Swing		

==== 2013 ====
Church Crookham and Ewshot
Party	Candidate	Votes	%	±%
CCH	John Bennison	2367	54.48	
Conservative	Wallace Vincent	1167	26.86	
UKIP	Nigel Johnson	579	13.33	
Labour	Ruth Williams	232	5.34	
Majority				
Turnout		4345	32.54	−12.12
CCH hold		Swing		

==== 2017 ====
Church Crookham & Ewshot
Party	Candidate	Votes	%	±%
CCH	John Bennison	3055	55	
Conservative	Stephen Alexander Gorys	1787	32	
Labour	Clive Astin	324	6	
Green	Chas Spradbery	188	3	
UKIP	Dawn Moors	176	3	
Majority		1268		
Turnout		5530	39	
CCH hold		Swing		

Fleet Town
Party	Candidate	Votes	%	±%
Conservative	Steve Forster	2735	48	
CCH	Alan John Oliver	2227	39	
Labour	Sam Butler	483	9	
UKIP	Alan Harry Langridge	155	3	
Monster Raving Loony	Howling Laud Hope	78	1	
Majority		508		
Turnout		5678	40	
Conservative gain from New Ward		Swing		

==== 2021 ====
Church Crookham & Ewshot
Party	Candidate	Votes	%	±%
CCH	John Bennison	2391	38	
Conservative	Stephen George Parker	2676	43	
Labour	Andrew Perkins	384	6	
Liberal Democrats	Christine Oldfield	739	12	
Majority		285		
Turnout		6233	42	
Conservative gain from CCH		Swing		

Fleet Town
Party	Candidate	Votes	%	±%
Conservative	Steve Forster	3,571	54	+6
CCH	Alan Oliver	1,386	21	−18
Liberal Democrats	Peter Wildsmith	1,063	16	New
Labour	Mike Mellor	452	7	−2
Reform	Roy Fang	102	2	New
Majority		2,185		
Turnout		6,574	44	
Conservative hold		Swing		

==== 2026 ====
Church Crookham & Ewshot
Party	Candidate	Votes	%	±%
CCH	Alan Oliver	2,594	37.7	
Conservative	Jon Farmer	1,686	24.5	
Reform	Cancice Walmsley	1,663	24.2	
Green	Sven Saar	639	9.3	
Labour	Adam Coulthard	300	4.4	
Rejected ballots		24		
Turnout		6882		
Registered electors		15,205		
CCH gain from Conservative				
