= 2024 Hart District Council election =

Election

- 2 May 2024

12 out of 33 seats to Hart District Council 17 seats needed for a majority

	Majority party	Minority party
Leader	David Neighbour	James Radley
Party	Liberal Democrats	CCH
Seats before	11 (Note: Including one vacant seat in Fleet East last held by the Liberal Democrats.)	10
Seats after	12	11
Seat change	▲1	▲1
	Third party	Fourth party
Leader	Anne Crampton
Party	Conservative	Independent
Seats before	11	1
Seats after	9	1
Seat change	▼2	Steady
- Map of the results
Leader before election
David Neighbour
Liberal Democrat
No overall control
Leader after election
David Neighbour
Liberal Democrat
No overall control

The 2024 Hart District Council election was held on 2 May 2024 to elect members of Hart District Council. There were 12 of the 33 seats on the council up for election, being the usual third of the council plus a by-election in Fleet East ward. The election took place at the same time as other local elections across England.

Prior to the election the council was under no overall control, being run by a coalition of the Liberal Democrats and local party Community Campaign Hart. Following the election the council remained under no overall control, and the same coalition continued to form the council's administration.

== Results summary ==
Hart District Council's composition following the 2024 elections.

The Conservatives lost two seats - Fleet East was won by the Liberal Democrats, while Fleet Central was won by Community Campaign (Hart). No other seats changed hands, and the council remained with no overall control.

2024 Hart District Council election
Party	Seats won in 2024	Change	Seats overall
Liberal Democrats	5	▲1	12
Community Campaign Hart (Residents Association)	3	▲1	11
Conservative Party	4	▼2	9
Independent and others	0	Steady	1

== Ward results ==
=== Blackwater & Hawley ===
Blackwater & Hawley
Party	Candidate	Votes	%	±%
Liberal Democrats	Andy Brown	1,082	60.5	−2.9
Conservative	Sue Perkins	419	23.4	−2.6
Labour	Carly Bidwell	286	16.0	+5.3
Majority				
Turnout		1,787	28.18	
Liberal Democrats hold		Swing		

=== Crookham East ===
Crookham East
Party	Candidate	Votes	%	±%
CCH	James Radley*	1,268	60.6	+5.2
Conservative	Mike Thorne	596	28.5	−6.5
Labour	Mike Mellor	228	10.9	+1.3
Majority				
Turnout		2,092	35.87	
CCH hold		Swing		

=== Crookham West & Ewshot ===
Crookham West & Ewshot
Party	Candidate	Votes	%	±%
CCH	Tina Collins*	1,601	67.4	+22.6
Conservative	Bruce Bulgin	773	32.6	−2.8
Majority				
Turnout		2,374	29.84	
CCH hold		Swing		

=== Fleet Central ===
Fleet Central
Party	Candidate	Votes	%	±%
CCH	Richard Jones	1,103	45.4	+1.1
Conservative	Roy Fang	854	35.1	−2.6
Labour	Andrew Perkins	384	15.8	+0.9
Monster Raving Loony	Howling Laud Hope	91	3.7	+0.6
Majority				
Turnout		2,432	36.65	
CCH gain from Conservative		Swing		

=== Fleet East ===
Fleet East
Party	Candidate	Votes	%	±%
Liberal Democrats	Daisy Khepar	1,155	47.7	−6.0
Liberal Democrats	Dan Taylor	1,086	44.8	−8.9
Conservative	Ellie May	893	36.9	+3.9
Conservative	Jonathan Wright*	867	35.8	+2.8
Green	Kev Munt	294	12.1	+4.6
Labour	Valmai Wainhouse	262	10.8	+5.0
Majority				
Turnout		2,422	39.39	
Liberal Democrats hold		Swing		
Liberal Democrats gain from Conservative		Swing		

=== Fleet West ===
Fleet West
Party	Candidate	Votes	%	±%
Conservative	Steve Forster	1,149	45.9	+6.8
CCH	Wayne Rozier	1,101	44.0	+1.3
Labour	Zach Seth	255	10.2	−0.1
Majority				
Turnout		2,505	36.87	
Conservative hold		Swing		

=== Hartley Wintney ===
Hartley Wintney
Party	Candidate	Votes	%	±%
Conservative	Anne Crampton*	1,168	44.4	−10.2
Liberal Democrats	Deborah Fontana	848	32.2	+9.6
Homeland	Roger Robertson	355	13.5	N/A
Labour	Alex Christie	261	9.9	N/A
Majority				
Turnout		2,632	36.20	
Conservative hold		Swing		

=== Hook ===
Hook
Party	Candidate	Votes	%	±%
Conservative	Selena Coburn*	1,045	43.3	+5.4
Liberal Democrats	Shamraz Razzaq	754	31.3	N/A
Labour	Amanda Affleck-Cruise	405	16.8	+0.7
Green	Joseph Hutton	207	8.6	N/A
Majority				
Turnout		2,411	32.94	
Conservative hold		Swing		

=== Odiham ===
Odiham
Party	Candidate	Votes	%	±%
Conservative	Stephen Highley	1,267	58.7	−3.1
Liberal Democrats	Tony Over	470	21.8	+2.3
Green	Lars Mosesson	230	10.7	+0.1
Labour	Ben Jones	192	8.9	+0.8
Majority				
Turnout		2,159	33.38	
Conservative hold		Swing		

=== Yateley East ===
Yateley East
Party	Candidate	Votes	%	±%
Liberal Democrats	Graham Cockarill*	1,275	59.6	−0.9
Conservative	Andrew Boon	393	18.4	−8.3
Reform	Trevor Lloyd-Jones	218	10.2	+5.9
Labour	Robbie Wiltshire	174	8.1	−0.4
Green	Cathy Park	81	3.8	N/A
Majority				
Turnout		2,141	32.23	
Liberal Democrats hold		Swing		

=== Yateley West ===
Yateley West
Party	Candidate	Votes	%	±%
Liberal Democrats	Mark Vernon	1,599	75.2	+14.6
Conservative	Richard Martin	528	24.8	−0.7
Majority				
Turnout		2,127	32.32	
Liberal Democrats hold		Swing		

== By-elections ==
=== Yateley West ===
Yateley West by-election: 8 October 2025
Party	Candidate	Votes	%	±%
Liberal Democrats	Alexander Drage	1,101	54.7	–20.5
Reform	Clive Lawrance	562	27.9	N/A
Conservative	Sandra Miller	348	17.3	–7.5
Majority		539	26.8	–23.6
Turnout		2,014	30.0	–2.3
Registered electors		6,713		
Liberal Democrats hold				

== See also ==
- Hart District Council elections
