= 2022 Hart District Council election =

Elections to Hart District Council took place on 5 May 2022 as part of the 2022 United Kingdom local elections.

Map of the results

== Results summary ==
2022 Hart District Council election
Party	This election			Full council			This election		
Party	Seats	Net	Seats %	Other	Total	Total %	Votes	Votes %	+/−
Conservative	3	▼1	27.3	8	11	34.4	10,966	40.7	-8.5
Liberal Democrats	4	▲1	36.4	7	11	34.4	8,403	31.2	+8.8
CCH	4	Steady	36.4	6	10	31.3	5,492	20.4	+1.7
Labour	0	Steady	0.0	0	0	0.0	1,361	5.1	-0.9
Green	0	Steady	0.0	0	0	0.0	538	2.0	-0.7
Monster Raving Loony	0	Steady	0.0	0	0	0.0	100	0.4	+0.1
Heritage	0	Steady	0.0	0	0	0.0	52	0.2	N/A

== Ward results ==
=== Blackwater and Hawley ===
Blackwater and Hawley
Party	Candidate	Votes	%	±%
Liberal Democrats	Beth Woods	1,398	71.3	+13.7
Conservative	John Burtin	563	28.7	−5.7
Majority		835	42.6	
Turnout		1,969	31.6	
Liberal Democrats hold		Swing	▲9.7	

=== Crookham East ===
Crookham East
Party	Candidate	Votes	%	±%
CCH	Gill Butler	1,531	66.2	+9.5
Conservative	Bruce Bulgin	783	33.8	−9.5
Majority		748	32.4	
Turnout		2,336	39.4	
CCH hold		Swing	▲9.5	

=== Crookham West and Ewshot ===
Crookham West and Ewshot
Party	Candidate	Votes	%	±%
CCH	Wendy Makepeace-Brown	1,589	61.8	+12.8
Conservative	Mike Thorne	983	38.2	−3.6
Majority		606	23.6	
Turnout		2,591	33.2	
CCH hold		Swing	▲8.2	

=== Fleet Central ===
Fleet Central
Party	Candidate	Votes	%	±%
CCH	Alan Oliver	1,168	45.0	+11.1
Conservative	Roy Fang	1,012	39.0	−8.4
Labour	Andrew Perkins	316	12.2	+3.8
Monster Raving Loony	Alan Hope	100	3.9	+1.4
Majority		156	6.0	
Turnout		2,602	38.5	
CCH hold		Swing	▲9.8	

=== Fleet East ===
Fleet East
Party	Candidate	Votes	%	±%
Liberal Democrats	Silke Engström	1,190	47.1	+9.5
Conservative	Shikha Krishnmurthy	972	38.5	−11.1
Green	Samantha Davis	207	8.2	N/A
Labour	Valmai Wainhouse	156	6.2	−2.0
Majority		218	8.6	
Turnout		2,543	42.3	
Liberal Democrats gain from Conservative		Swing	▲10.3	

=== Fleet West ===
Fleet West
Party	Candidate	Votes	%	±%
CCH	Ange Delaney	1,204	46.7	+17.7
Conservative	Mohua Chakraborty	1,041	40.4	−16.4
Green	Wayne Rozier	331	12.8	+6.2
Majority		163	6.3	
Turnout		2,587	38.0	
CCH hold		Swing	▲17.1	

=== Hartley Wintney ===
Hartley Wintney
Party	Candidate	Votes	%	±%
Conservative	Timothy Southern	1,697	65.4	−8.8
Liberal Democrats	Wilf Hardy	576	22.2	−3.6
Labour	Nicola Denley	320	12.3	N/A
Majority		1,121	43.2	
Turnout		2,622	35.4	
Conservative hold		Swing	▼2.6	

=== Hook ===
Hook
Party	Candidate	Votes	%	±%
Conservative	Jane Worlock	1,253	47.1	−8.1
Liberal Democrats	Carl-Ludwig Campbell	1,078	40.5	+8.1
Labour	Amanda Affleck-Cruise	331	12.4	±0.0
Majority		175	6.6	
Turnout		2,676	36.6	
Conservative hold		Swing	▼8.1	

=== Odiham ===
Odiham
Party	Candidate	Votes	%	±%
Conservative	Jon Hale	1,412	59.3	−8.3
Liberal Democrats	Tony Over	971	40.7	+25.2
Majority		441	18.6	
Turnout		2,403	36.6	
Conservative hold		Swing	▼16.8	

=== Yateley East ===
Yateley East
Party	Candidate	Votes	%	±%
Liberal Democrats	Stuart Bailey	1,697	73.3	+24.6
Conservative	Jane Britton	618	26.7	−8.1
Majority		1,079	46.6	
Turnout		2,326	34.4	
Liberal Democrats hold		Swing	▲16.4	

=== Yateley West ===
Yateley West
Party	Candidate	Votes	%	±%
Liberal Democrats	Richard Quarterman	1,493	61.8	+4.6
Conservative	Richard Martin	632	26.2	−9.2
Labour	Joyce Still	238	9.9	+2.5
Heritage	Frances Crompton	52	2.2	N/A
Majority		861	35.6	
Turnout		2,419	36.3	
Liberal Democrats hold		Swing	▲6.9	
