= 2019 Hart District Council election =

2019 UK local government election

2019 Hart District Council Election
- 2 May 2019

11 seats to Hart District Council 17 seats needed for a majority
	First party	Second party
Party	Conservative	CCH
Seats before	16	9
Seats won	3	4
Seats after	11	11
Seat change	▼5	▲2
Popular vote	8,495	6,341
	Third party	Fourth party
Party	Liberal Democrats	Independent
Seats before	8	0
Seats won	4	1
Seats after	10	1
Seat change	▲2	▲1
Popular vote	8,026	1,596
- Results map
Council control before election
No overall control
Council control after election
No overall control

The 2019 Hart District Council election took place on 2 May 2019 to elect members of Hart District Council in England. This was on the same day as other local elections.

== Summary ==
Council composition after the election

The election saw the Conservatives lose five seats, two each to Community Campaign Hart and the Liberal Democrats, and one an independent candidate. The council remained under no overall control, with the Conservative party and Community Campaign the joint largest parties with eleven seats each overall. Subsequently, an administration was formed by Community Campaign Hart and the Liberal Democrats, with Liberal Democrat Councillor David Neighbour becoming leader of the council, and Community Campaign Hart Councillor James Radley becoming deputy leader of the council.

== Results ==
2019 Hart District Council election
Party	This election				Full council			This election		
Party	Candidates	Seats	Net	Seats %	Other	Total	Total %	Votes	Votes %	+/−
Conservative	{{{candidates}}}	3	▼5	25.0	8	11	33.3	8,495	30.7	-12.4
CCH	{{{candidates}}}	4	▲2	33.3	7	11	33.3	6,341	22.9	+2.2
Liberal Democrats	{{{candidates}}}	4	▲2	33.3	6	10	30.3	8,026	29.0	+4.7
Independent	{{{candidates}}}	1	▲1	8.3	0	1	3.0	1,596	5.8	New
Labour	{{{candidates}}}	0	Steady	0.0	0	0	0.0	1,146	4.1	-3.6
Green	{{{candidates}}}	0	Steady	0.0	0	0	0.0	1,041	3.8	+1.4
UKIP	{{{candidates}}}	0	Steady	0.0	0	0	0.0	662	2.4	+1.3
Others	{{{candidates}}}	0	Steady	0.0	0	0	0.0	383	1.4	+0.7

== Ward results ==
=== Blackwater & Hawley ===
Blackwater & Hawley
Party	Candidate	Votes	%	±%
Liberal Democrats	Robert Harward	1,309	70.4	+9.5
Conservative	John Burton	341	18.3	−8.8
UKIP	Michael Gascoigne	210	11.3	+6.9
Majority				
Turnout		968		
Liberal Democrats hold		Swing		

=== Crookham East ===
Crookham East
Party	Candidate	Votes	%	±%
CCH	Christopher Axam	1,670	72.3	+4.8
Conservative	Sebastian Gidley	536	23.2	−2.1
Labour	Clive Astin	105	4.5	−2.7
Majority		1,134		
Turnout				
CCH hold		Swing		

=== Crookham West & Ewshot ===
Crookham West & Ewshot
Party	Candidate	Votes	%	±%
CCH	Anthony Clarke	1,832	74.4	+9.3
Conservative	Michael Thorne	500	20.3	−7.0
Labour	Lila Mabo	129	5.2	−2.4
Majority		1,332		
Turnout				
CCH hold		Swing		

=== Fleet Central ===
Fleet Central
Party	Candidate	Votes	%	±%
CCH	Katherine Davies	1,607	64.2	+14.5
Conservative	Jonathan Seale	632	25.2	−13.1
Labour	Jack Theaker	148	5.9	−3.8
Monster Raving Loony	Alan Hope	118	4.7	+2.4
Majority		975		
Turnout				
CCH gain from Conservative		Swing		

=== Fleet East ===
Fleet East
Party	Candidate	Votes	%	±%
Liberal Democrats	Peter Wildsmith	1,402	60.4	+17.9
Conservative	Stephen Parker	781	33.6	−12.7
Labour	John Gawthorpe	140	6.0	−0.8
Majority		621		
Turnout				
Liberal Democrats gain from Conservative		Swing		

=== Fleet West ===
Fleet West
Party	Candidate	Votes	%	±%
CCH	Sara-Lea Kinnell	1,232	56.1	+9.9
Conservative	Glyn Carpenter	659	30.0	−15.9
Green	Wayne Rozier	218	9.9	N/A
Labour	Michael Mellor	86	3.9	−4.0
Majority		573		
Turnout				
CCH gain from Conservative		Swing		

=== Hartley Wintney ===
Hartley Wintney
Party	Candidate	Votes	%	±%
Conservative	Spencer Farmer	1,064	42.1	−18.7
Liberal Democrats	Howard Kitto	858	34.0	+11.9
Green	Ruth Jarman	389	15.4	+7.0
For Britain	Roger Robertson	215	8.5	N/A
Majority		206		
Turnout				
Conservative hold		Swing		

=== Hook ===
Hook
Party	Candidate	Votes	%	±%
Independent	Dermot Smith	1,596	63.0	N/A
Conservative	Liz Tomlinson	806	31.8	−31.7
Liberal Democrats	Craig Wilson	799	31.5	+10.5
Conservative	Jonathan Hale	790	31.2	−32.3
Labour	Amanda Affleck-Cruise	301	11.9	−0.5
UKIP	Ruth Hamilton	260	10.3	+7.3
Majority				
Turnout				
Independent gain from Conservative		Swing		
Conservative hold		Swing		

=== Odiham ===
Odiham
Party	Candidate	Votes	%	±%
Conservative	Christopher Dorn	1,247	56.0	−17.5
Liberal Democrats	Anthony Over	544	24.4	+15.7
Green	Lars Mosesson	434	19.5	+10.3
Majority		703		
Turnout				
Conservative hold		Swing		

=== Yateley East ===
Yateley East
Party	Candidate	Votes	%	±%
Liberal Democrats	David Neighbour	1,569	67.8	+9.9
Conservative	Christopher Barnes	624	27.0	−1.7
Labour	Beaumont Nabbs	120	5.2	−0.3
Majority		945		
Turnout				
Liberal Democrats hold		Swing		

=== Yateley West ===
Yateley West
Party	Candidate	Votes	%	±%
Liberal Democrats	Roger Lamb	1,545	63.9	+7.8
Conservative	Shawn Dickens	515	21.3	−13.9
UKIP	John Howe	192	7.9	+5.3
Labour	John Davies	117	4.8	−1.3
For Britain	Geoffrey Crompton	50	2.1	N/A
Majority		1030		
Turnout				
Liberal Democrats gain from Conservative		Swing		
