= 2014 Hart District Council election =

2014 UK local government election

2014 Hart District Council Election
- 22 May 2014

All 33 seats to Hart District Council 17 seats needed for a majority
	First party	Second party
Party	Conservative	Liberal Democrats
Seats won	14	9
	Third party	Fourth party
Party	CCH	Independent
Seats won	9	1
- Results map of the composition of the three-member wards after the election
Council control before election
No overall control
Council control after election
No overall control

The 2014 Hart District Council election took place on 22 May 2014 to elect members of Hart District Council in England. This was on the same day as other local elections, as well as the 2014 European Parliament elections. The election saw new boundaries, the first revision since 2002.

== Results summary ==
The table below only tallies the votes of the highest polling candidate for each party within each ward. This is known as the top candidate method and is often used for multi-member plurality elections.

Hart District Council election, 2014
Party	Seats	Gains	Losses	Net gain/loss	Seats %	Votes %	Votes	+/−
Conservative	14	14	0	▲14	42.42		11,983	
Liberal Democrats	9	9	0	▲9	27.27		6,299	
CCH	9	9	0	▲9	27.27		5,340	
UKIP	0	0	0		0		2,743	
Labour	0	0	0		0		2,059	
Independent	1	1	0	▲1	3.03		1,406	
Green			0		3.03		546	

== Ward results ==
=== Blackwater and Hawley ===
Blackwater and Hawley Ward
Party	Candidate	Votes	%	±%
Liberal Democrats	Adrian Collett	1,376		
Liberal Democrats	Brian Blewett	1,163		
Liberal Democrats	Bob Harward	987		
Conservative	Vivienne Gascoigne	680		
Labour Co-op	Les Lawrie	234		
Liberal Democrats win (new seat)				
Liberal Democrats win (new seat)				
Liberal Democrats win (new seat)				

=== Crookham East ===
Crookham East Ward
Party	Candidate	Votes	%	±%
CCH	Gill Butler	1,432		
CCH	James Radley	1,407		
CCH	Chris Axam	1,403		
Conservative	Helen Butler	727		
Conservative	Debbie Moss	585		
Conservative	Keith Kapri	470		
UKIP	Dawn Moors	389		
Labour	James Legget	188		
Labour	Ruth Williams	187		
CCH win (new seat)				
CCH win (new seat)				
CCH win (new seat)				

=== Crookham West & Ewshot ===
Crookham West and Ewshot Ward
Party	Candidate	Votes	%	±%
CCH	Jenny Radley	1,708		
CCH	Simon Ambler	1,591		
CCH	Tony Clarke	1,590		
Conservative	Anthony Barrell	671		
Conservative	Chris Simmons	654		
Conservative	Tim Davies	564		
CCH win (new seat)				
CCH win (new seat)				
CCH win (new seat)				

=== Fleet Central ===
Fleet Central Ward
Party	Candidate	Votes	%	±%
CCH	Alan Oliver	1,376		
CCH	Wendy Makepeace-Browne	1,591		
CCH	John Bennison	1,099		
Conservative	Gavin Evans	1057		
Conservative	Chris Butler	930		
Conservative	Akmal Gani	621		
UKIP	Robert Banks	442		
Labour	Peter Green	248		
Labour	Johnathan Hutchinson	179		
Monster Raving Loony	Howling Laud Hope	121		
CCH win (new seat)				
CCH win (new seat)				
CCH win (new seat)				

=== Fleet East ===
Fleet East Ward
Party	Candidate	Votes	%	±%
Conservative	Sharyn Wheale	1,464		
Conservative	Ian Lewis	1,294		
Conservative	Stephen Parker	1,215		
Liberal Democrats	Paul Einchcomb	551		
Liberal Democrats	Richard Robinson	515		
UKIP	John Howe	460		
Liberal Democrats	Neil Walton	417		
Labour	John Gawthorpe	288		
Labour	Gerard Jones	232		
Conservative win (new seat)				
Conservative win (new seat)				
Conservative win (new seat)				

=== Fleet West ===
Fleet West Ward
Party	Candidate	Votes	%	±%
Conservative	Richard Woods	1,148		
Conservative	Steve Forster	1,066		
Conservative	Perdi Forset	1,050		
CCH	Harriet England	824		
CCH	Stephen Cantle	790		
UKIP	Gordon Smith	406		
Liberal Democrats	Ros Gordon	275		
Labour	James Hurst	249		
Liberal Democrats	Jeff Smith	218		
Conservative win (new seat)				
Conservative win (new seat)				
Conservative win (new seat)				

=== Hartley Witney ===
Hartley Witney Ward
Party	Candidate	Votes	%	±%
Conservative	Tim Southern	1,576		
Conservative	Sara Kinnell	1,521		
Conservative	Anne Crampton	1,518		
Green	Francis Gantley	546		
Liberal Democrats	Tony Over	539		
UKIP	Altay Ali	537		
Conservative win (new seat)				
Conservative win (new seat)				
Conservative win (new seat)				

=== Hook ===
Hook Ward
Party	Candidate	Votes	%	±%
Independent	Robert Leeson	1,406		
Conservative	Mike Morris	1,215		
Conservative	Brian Burchfield	1,143		
Conservative	Jonathan Glen	1134		
UKIP	Ruth Hamilton	458		
UKIP	Richard Palmer	377		
Liberal Democrats	Marguerite Simpson	297		
Labour	Jacqueline Nabbs	271		
Labour	Beaumont Nabbs	243		
Independent win (new seat)				
Conservative win (new seat)				
Conservative win (new seat)				

=== Odiham ===
Odiham Ward
Party	Candidate	Votes	%	±%
Conservative	Ken Crookes	1,796		
Conservative	John Kennett	1,579		
Conservative	Stephen Gorys	1,436		
UKIP	Rob Blay	556		
Liberal Democrats	Antony Baines	517		
UKIP	Michelle Ali	509		
Conservative win (new seat)				
Conservative win (new seat)				
Conservative win (new seat)				

=== Yateley East ===
Yateley East Ward
Party	Candidate	Votes	%	±%
Liberal Democrats	Stuart Bailey	1,436		
Liberal Democrats	Graham Cockarill	1,320		
Liberal Democrats	David Neighbour	1,107		
Conservative	John Burton	776		
UKIP	Sue Perkins	732		
Labour	Alistair Sutherland	274		
Liberal Democrats win (new seat)				
Liberal Democrats win (new seat)				
Liberal Democrats win (new seat)				

=== Yateley West ===
Yateley West Ward
Party	Candidate	Votes	%	±%
Liberal Democrats	Myra Billings	1,308		
Liberal Democrats	Gerry Crisp	1,231		
Liberal Democrats	Colin Ive	1,226		
Conservative	Shawn Dickens	873		
Conservative	Kulwant Lit	806		
Labour	Joyce Still	307		
Labour	Thomas Hemmings	290		
Liberal Democrats win (new seat)				
Liberal Democrats win (new seat)				
Liberal Democrats win (new seat)				
