= 2016 Hart District Council election =

2016 UK local government election

2016 Hart District Council Election
- 5 May 2016

11 seats to Hart District Council 17 seats needed for a majority
	First party	Second party	Third party
Party	Conservative	Liberal Democrats	CCH
Seats before	16	8	8
Seats won	5	3	3
Seats after	16	8	8
- Results map
Council control before election
No overall control
Council control after election
No overall control

The 2016 Hart District Council election took place on 5 May 2016 to elect members of Hart District Council in England. This was on the same day as other local elections.

== Results ==
The election saw no gains or losses of seats, with each of the parties holding their incumbent seats up for election, meaning that the council composition remained the same.

Hart district local election result 2016
Party	Seats	Gains	Losses	Net gain/loss	Seats %	Votes %	Votes	+/−
Conservative	5	Steady	Steady	Steady	45.45	39.55	9606	
Liberal Democrats	3	Steady	Steady	Steady	27.27	24.79	6022	
CCH	3	Steady	Steady	Steady	27.27	19.13	4647	
UKIP	0	Steady	Steady	Steady		7.43	1806	
Labour	0	Steady	Steady	Steady		7.42	1803	
Green	0	Steady	Steady	Steady		1.48	361	
Monster Raving Loony	0	Steady	Steady	Steady		0.17	42	

== Results by Ward ==
=== Blackwater and Hawley ===
Blackwater & Hawley Ward
Party	Candidate	Votes	%	±%
Liberal Democrats	Brian Blewett	1223	61.1	
Conservative	Jane Dickens	364	18.2	
UKIP	Mike Gascoigne	248	12.4	
Labour	Amy Cullen	124	6.2	
Green	Steve Francis	44	2.2	
Majority				
Liberal Democrats hold		Swing		

=== Crookham East ===
Crookham East Ward
Party	Candidate	Votes	%	±%
CCH	Edward Radley	1604	70.4	
Conservative	Helen Butler	540	23.7	
Labour	Ruth Williams	135	5.9	
Majority				
CCH hold		Swing		

=== Crookham West and Ewshot ===
Crookham West and Ewshot Ward
Party	Candidate	Votes	%	±%
CCH	Simon Ambler	1343	58.7	
Conservative	Christopher Simmons	616	26.9	
UKIP	Julie Moors	162	7.1	
Labour	Moira Smyth	98	4.3	
Majority				
CCH hold		Swing		

=== Fleet Central ===
Fleet Central Ward
Party	Candidate	Votes	%	±%
CCH	Wendy Makepeace-Browne	1184	49.7	
Conservative	Max Bobetsky	743	31.2	
Labour	John Gawthorpe	213	8.9	
UKIP	David Owens	200	8.4	
Monster Raving Loony	Alan Hope	42	1.8	
Majority				
CCH hold		Swing		

=== Fleet East ===
Fleet East Ward
Party	Candidate	Votes	%	±%
Conservative	Jonathan Wright	1188	56.0	
Liberal Democrats	Neil Walton	446		
Labour	Samuel Butler	267	12.6	
UKIP	Peter Devonshire	220	10.4	
Majority				
Conservative hold		Swing		

=== Fleet West ===
Fleet West Ward
Party	Candidate	Votes	%	±%
Conservative	Steven Forster	1034	53.8	
CCH	John Bennison	516	26.8	
Liberal Democrats	Paul Einchcomb	157	8.2	
UKIP	Karing Rutter	109		
Labour	Lesley Buckland	107		
Majority				
Conservative hold		Swing		

=== Hartley Wintney ===
Hartney Witney Ward
Party	Candidate	Votes	%	±%
Conservative	Anne Crampton	1320	57.6	
Liberal Democrats	Alan Woolford	409	17.8	
UKIP	Ruth Hamilton	214	9.3	
Green	Ruth Jarman	214	9.3	
Labour	Ieuan Williams	136	5.9	
Majority				
Conservative hold		Swing		

=== Hook ===
Hook Ward
Party	Candidate	Votes	%	±%
Conservative	Michael Morris	1352	65.4	
Labour	Beaumont Nabbs	292	14.1	
UKIP	Winstone Rees	252	12.2	
Liberal Democrats	Colin Ive	172	8.3	
Majority				
Conservative hold		Swing		

=== Odiham ===
Odiham Ward
Party	Candidate	Votes	%	±%
Conservative	John Kennet	1380	66.7	
UKIP	Kevin Oliver	290	14.0	
Liberal Democrats	Rosalyn Gordon	221	10.7	
Labour	Amanda Affleck-Cruise	177	8.6	
Majority				
Conservative hold		Swing		

=== Yateley East ===
Yateley East Ward
Party	Candidate	Votes	%	±%
Liberal Democrats	Graham Cokarill	1631	67.9	
Conservative	John Burton	526	21.9	
Labour	Joyce Still	143	6.0	
Green	Francis Gantley	103	4.3	
Majority				
Liberal Democrats hold		Swing		

=== Yateley West ===
Yateley West Ward
Party	Candidate	Votes	%	±%
Liberal Democrats	Gerry Crisp	1763	66.3	
Conservative	Peter Hall	543	20.4	
UKIP	John Howe	111	4.2	
Labour	Alistair Sutherland	111	4.2	
Majority				
Liberal Democrats hold		Swing		
