= Peter Cowan =

Peter Cowan may refer to:

- Peter Cowan (writer) (1914–2002)
- Peter Chalmers Cowan (1859–1930), Scottish civil engineer
- Peter Ernest Cowan (1882–1955), politician
- Pete Cowen (born 1951), English golf coach
- Peter Cowan (canoeist) (born 1995), New Zealand Paralympic canoeist
