= Fleet, Hampshire =

Town and civil parish in Hampshire, England

Fleet
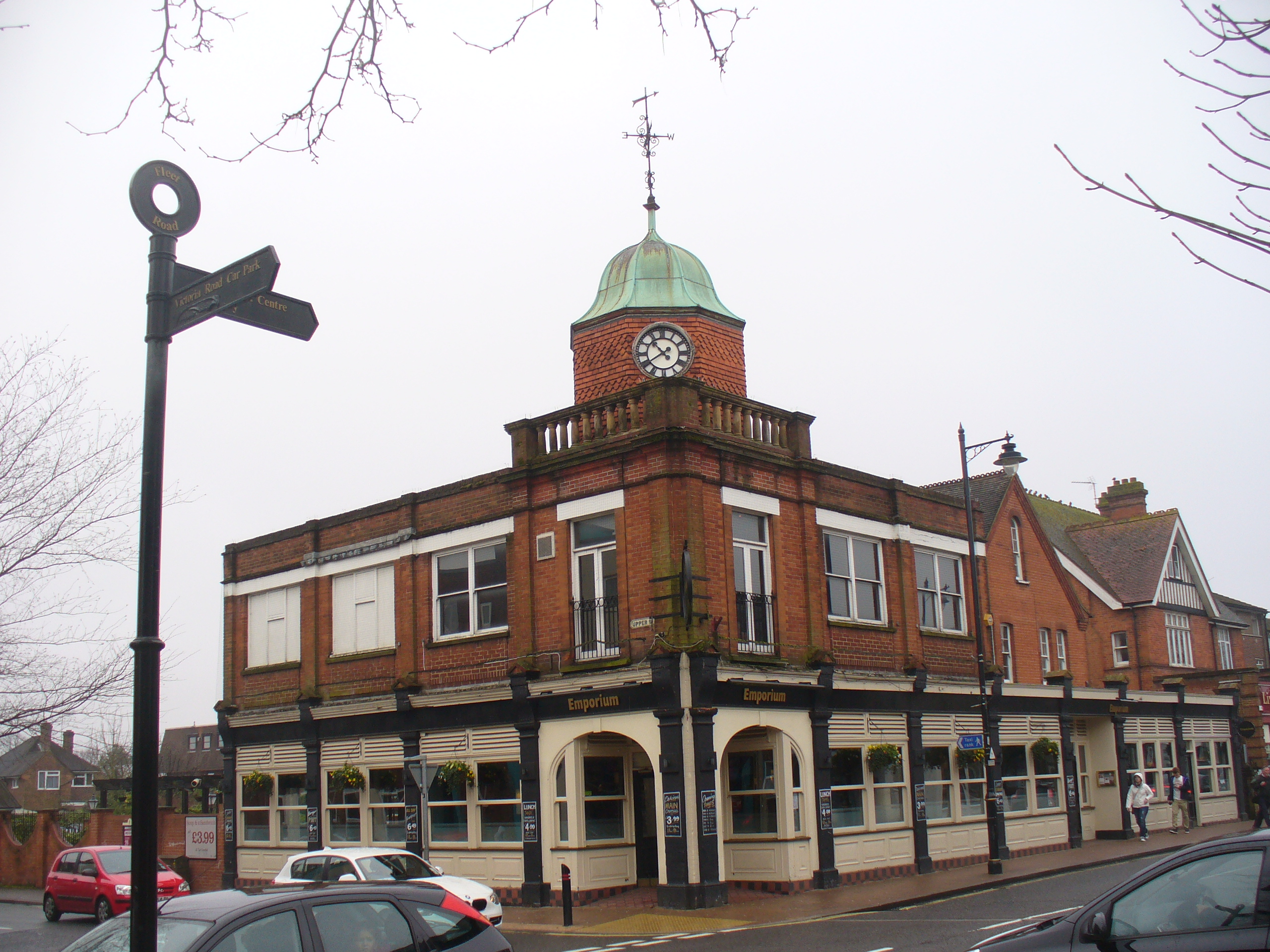
- Clocktower, Fleet

- Location within Hampshire
- Population: 44,822 (town); 23,485 (civil parish) (2021)
- OS grid reference: SU8054
  - London: 38.2 miles (61.5 km)
- Civil parish: Fleet
- District: Hart
- Shire county: Hampshire
- Region: South East
- Country: England
- Sovereign state: United Kingdom
- Post town: FLEET
- Postcode district: GU51, GU52
- Dialling code: 01252
- Police: Hampshire and Isle of Wight
- Fire: Hampshire and Isle of Wight
- Ambulance: South Central
- UK Parliament: North East Hampshire

Current map of Fleet

Fleet is a town and civil parish in the Hart District of Hampshire, England, centred 38 miles (61 km) south-west of London and 13 miles (21 km) east of Basingstoke, near the towns of Farnborough, Aldershot and Farnham. The town is sometimes referred to as Fleet and Crookham, as the urban development is continuous and inseparable between Fleet, Church Crookham and Crookham Village, while the civil parish of Fleet Town Council manages Fleet town centre and its surrounding areas.

It is the largest town of the Hart District and features several major technology business areas, fast rail links to London, and a nearby connection to the M3 motorway. The nearby motorway service station, Fleet services, is named after the town. Fleet railway station is the only railway station in the town, providing direct commuter services to major cities such as London, Winchester, Southampton and Portsmouth. The Basingstoke Canal runs through the town; once a major transport route for goods, it has become a leisure route and an important habitat for waterfowl.

As of 2021 town of Fleet had a total population of 44,822 and includes the contiguous parishes of Church Crookham, Crookham Village, Dogmersfield, Elvetham Heath, as well as Ewshot. The town has a prominent golf club, an athletics club and two major football clubs.

Major annual events in the town include Fleet Half Marathon, Fleet Carnival, Music on The Views, Lions Firework Fiesta, Remembrance Sunday and Fleet Christmas Festival.

Local landmarks include Fleet Pond, the largest freshwater lake in Hampshire, and a High Street featuring many Victorian and Edwardian buildings. Major civic services are located in Fleet town centre, including Fleet Library and The Harlington, a community arts and civic centre. A weekly Saturday market is held in Gurkha Square, in front of the library.

The eastern end of Fleet is occupied by the Aldershot and Minley training areas, which are covered by forest and heathland and managed by the Ministry of Defence. This stretch of natural habitat separates Fleet from the built-up areas of Aldershot and Farnborough. Much of the land remains publicly accessible.

== Etymology ==
Local historian Ted Roe, in his 1975 book Mainly about Old Fleet and Crookham, provided an account of Fleet. He wrote:

The stream running out of the pond to the north almost certainly gave Fleet its name. ‘Fleet’ is probably a corruption of ‘La Flete’ (Norman French for a stream) or ‘Fleet’—a stream, creek, inlet, or shallow water (Oxford English Dictionary).

He referred to Fleet as the stream (now sometimes called Fleet Brook) that runs north out of Fleet Pond. Its waters would eventually flow into the River Thames. And he further noted that Fleet Pond was a source of supply of fish for the monks at Winchester, in Medieval times.

Richard Coates, offering a different explanation, in his 1989 book The Place-Names of Hampshire: Based on the Collection of the English Place-Name Society, provided two sources: 1313 Flete and 1505 le Flete(brige), Fletepondes. Rather than referring to a stream, he suggested that "Fleet" referred to Fleet Pond, the large natural pond. It originated from Old English/Middle English flēot, a word that typically means a creek or stretch of salt water but occasionally refers to inland features like Fleet Pond.

He also provided an account of the suburb of Pondtail (referred to as Pondtails in his book). In 1826, Pondtail Farm was situated near the point where a stream, namely Gelvert Stream, feeds Fleet Pond. The term "Tail" is a common feature in minor place names, particularly in Sussex. He further described the ground in the area as a large stretch of drift, surrounded by soils of the Holidays Hill Association, a type of soil associated with Holidays Hill in the New Forest. As a side note, the characteristics of this association are as follows:

Naturally very acidic sandy soils over clayey and loamy soils, locally with humose or peaty surface horizons, slowly permeable subsoils, and slight seasonal waterlogging. Some very acidic, well-drained sandy soils, alongside some perennially waterlogged soils with a peaty surface horizon. In places, there are shallow soils over sandstone.

— Harpenden, Soil Survey of England and Wales. Sheet 6, Soils of South East England

The type of soil is reflected in place names such as Blacklake Copse(now Tavistock Infant School and All Saints School), Aunt's Pool Hill (near Aldershot Road in Tweseldown) and The Flash (now Waterfront Business Park; from Middle English flasshe, meaning 'swamp') in Fleet. He finally pointed out that, with this type of soil, streams drain into Fleet Pond and do not escape again.

Alternative brief accounts include:

- Fleet Hants. was known as Le Flete in Crondall (1506), according to The concise Oxford dictionary of English place-names (1960)
- Fleet Hants. was recorded as Flete in 1313, from Old English flēot, means (place at) the stream, pool, or creek, according to A Dictionary of British Place Names (2011).
- Old English flēot, the stream, or the pool, according to Concise Oxford Dictionary of World Place Names (2020).
- Middle English flete ‘estuary, watercourse’, derived from Old English flēot, according to Concise Oxford Dictionary of Family Names in Britain (2021).

== Geography ==
=== Location ===
Fleet is located in Hart District, in the northeast of Hampshire, South East England, at coordinate 51°17′00″N 0°50′44″W to be exact. To the northwest is Hartley Wintney, while to the northeast lie Blackwater and Hawley. To the east, it borders Rushmoor, namely Farnborough and Aldershot. To the south, it is adjacent to Ewshot and Crondall, also Waverley of Farnham, Surrey. To the west, it is bordered by Dogmersfield and Winchfield.

=== Scope ===
==== Fleet town ====
The boundaries of Fleet town encompass both the built-up area and its surrounding regions. Roughly speaking, the M3 motorway marks the northern boundary. From Junction 4A in the northeast, the boundary follows the A327 road, Kennel's Lane, Old Ively Road (now part of Cody Technology Park), and the Basingstoke Canal, forming part of the eastern boundary. It then continues southwards through Tweseldown, Beacon Hill and Caesar's Camp in military training area. The southern boundary lies in Ewshot and meets the River Hart, which then forms the western boundary of Fleet.

In modern times, the straight line of the M3 motorway is considered the northern boundary of Fleet town. However, prior to aligning with the M3, the Fleet Urban District Council naturally bordered Minley Brook, and the Fleet Wastewater Treatment Works lay within the former boundary, as did the eastbound Fleet Services. They now fall within Hartley Wintney. Conversely, to the east of Fleet Brook, which was once part of Hawley, the alignment with the M3 has resulted in this area now being part of Fleet.

Hart District Council divides Fleet town into several neighbourhoods in planning, namely Elvetham Heath and Ancells Farm, West Fleet, Fleet Town Centre, Pondtail, South Fleet, Church Crookham Estate and Basingstoke Canal Conservation Area. Another map shows additional neighbourhoods, Gally Hill Road, Sandy Lane Triangle, Zebon Copse Area and Queen Elizabeth Barracks and Environs.

There is no definitive guide to the exact boundaries or areas of Fleet town, apart from ever-changing election wards. By direction, roughly speaking:

- The northern parts of Fleet include Elvetham Heath, Ancells Farm, Bramshot Farm and Bramshot Country Park.
- The eastern parts consist of Hartland Park, Hartland Village, Hartland Country Park and part of Cody Technology Park of Pyestock, along with Velmead Common, Twelsedown and Beacon Hill.
- To the south, it is Crookham Park, Quetta Park, Naishes Lane SANGs and Redfields.
- The western area includes Albany Park, Zebon Copse, Crookham Village, Hareshill, Edenbrook Village, Edenbrook and Edenbrook Country Park.
- Apart from Fleet Pond, the core of the built-up area encompasses Fleet Town Centre, Victoria Hill, Pondtail, Velmead, Calthorpe Park, Hitches Hill, Dinorben, Court Moor, Church Crookham and Gally Hill.

==== Fleet parish ====
The civil parish of Fleet Town Council covers the northern part of the town, excluding Elvetham Heath, which has its own parish council. To the south, the northern part of Church Crookham falls under the administration of Fleet Town Council.

The boundary with Church Crookham Parish Council starts in the east at Norris Bridge Gyratory on the Basingstoke Canal and ends near Netherhouse Moor along the same canal. Key features along the boundary include Pondtail Bridge, Velmead Road, Fleet Infant School, Velmead Junior School, Velmead Common, Florence Road, Reading Road South, Award Road, The Grange Estate, Basingbourne Park, Wickham Place, Wickham Road, Coxheath Road, and Coxheath Road Bridge. Near Netherhouse Moor, the boundary meets that of Crookham Village Parish Council.

The boundary with Crookham Village Parish Council starts as above and ends in the River Hart. Key features along the boundary include Netherhouse Moor, covered Sandy Lane Ditch, The Lea, Hareshill and Edenbrook Country Park. At the River Hart, the boundary meets that of Dogmersfield.

=== Topography ===
Fleet Town is situated on the southern edge of the London Basin, or the Thames Basin, where surface water is collected into the River Thames. Streams in the town flows northwards.

==== Hills ====
Fleet is completely inland and has no mountains, but that does not mean it is entirely flat. Named hills appears in maps includes Caesars Camp, Pyestock Hill, Tweseldown Hill, Norris Hill, Aunt Pool Hill, Victoria Hill, Gally Hill (Crookham Knoll), Beacon Hill, The Mounts and others.

==== Water ====
The Fleet Pond nature reserve is a beauty spot on the northern edge of the town. It is the largest freshwater lake in Hampshire, covering 48.3 hectares (119 acres). It has been designated a Site of Special Scientific Interest and a Local Nature Reserve. Being very shallow, the lake is actively managed and needs regular dredging to avoid it silting up. Historically, it is believed to have been a fish pond built to supply the monks of Winchester during the medieval period. The Saxons referred to it as Fuglemere, meaning "wildfowl lake." In times past, the lake has frozen over, permitting skating.

The Basingstoke Canal was originally a waterway connecting Basingstoke to the Wey Navigation at West Byfleet, but following the collapse of Greywell Tunnel, it was shortened to its current terminus near Odiham Castle, upstream. Fleet can sail downstream to the Wey Navigation, which eventually leads to the River Thames. The winding hole in Fleet is located around Pondtail Bridge. Boats can berth at Reading Road Wharf or Fox and Hounds.

The River Hart is the main river in Fleet, forming its western boundary. Originating in Crondall, it flows through Fleet, joining Fleet Brook on its way towards the River Thames. On average, its depth is around half a metre.

The streams in Fleet are narrow, shallow, and unnavigable. Ordnance Survey usually typically refers to the streams in the area as Fleet Brook, but alternative names exist. Some streams are known by different names, such as Gelvert Stream, Brookly Stream and Sandy Lane Ditch.

==== Roads ====
The M3 motorway runs along the northern border of Fleet town, connecting Southampton to London via Winchester. The nearest access to the M3 from Fleet is Junction 4A Minley, via the A327 road. In Fleet, the Fleet Services are located to the north of Elvetham Heath, directly on the motorway.

There are several numbered A roads and B roads in Fleet town, includes A287 road, A323 road, A327 road, A3013 road, B3010 road, B3013 road and B3014 road.

The A287 road connects Hook and Haslemere, passing along the southern edge of Fleet town. To reach the built-up area around Church Crookham, one can take either Beacon Hill Road (B3013) or Redfields Lane, or alternatively, use Crondall Road and Hitches Lane to access Hareshill and Edenbrook via Crookham Village.

The A323 road connects Hartley Wintney and Guildford, passing through the southern end of Fleet Town Centre. The road reach multiple destinations in the town, including Hartland Village, Cody Technology Park, Pondtail, Church Crookham, Edenbrook and Elvetham Heath. From Aldershot to Hartley Wintney, the route consists of Fleet Road (Aldershot), Norris Hill Road, Aldershot Road (Pondtail and South Fleet), Reading Road South, Oatsheaf Crossroads in the town centre, Reading Road North and Fleet Road (Hartley Wintney). It meets Kings Road (B3010) near Pondtail Bridge and Reading Road South (B3013) near Reading Road Bridge.

The A327 road connects Reading and Farnborough, serving northeastern corner of the town and providing the only access to the M3 motorway. In Fleet, it begin with Junction 4A Minley, crossing Fleet Road (Cove) and South West Main Line railway over a bridge before continuing into Pyestock Roundabout and Southwood.

The A3013 road connects Farnborough and Fleet. It begins at the A327 road near Cove Services and ends at Oaksheaf Crossroads in the town centre. The route includes Cove Road, Minley Road, and Fleet Road (town centre). The road provides access to Bramshot Farm, Fleet Pond, Ancells Farm, Elvetham Heath (via Minley Road B3013), Fleet railway station, Waterfront Business Park, and Fleet Town Centre.

The B3010 road, known as Kings Road in Fleet, starts at the junction with Aldershot Road (A323) and Norris Hill Road (A323), and ends at Fleet Road (A3013) in the northern part of the Town Centre.

The B3013 road connects Minley and Ewshot in two sections: Minley Road, which runs from Minley to Fleet Railway Station, and Reading Road South with Beacon Hill Road, which connects Church Crookham to Ewshot. The gap between these sections is filled by Fleet Road (A3013) and Reading Road South (A323). The first section links Elvetham Heath and Ancells Farm, while the second section runs through the built-up area of Church Crookham.

The B3014 road connects Fleet and Farnborough, running from Cove Services to Farnborough town centre. In Fleet, it includes a short section of Fleet Road (Cove), starting at the junction with the A3013 road.

Other unnumbered main roads include Ancells Road, Elvetham Heath Way, Elvetham Road, Hitches Lane, Tavistock Road, Crookham Road, Velmead Road, Ively Road, Kennel's Lane, Aldershot Road (Church Crookham), The Street, Coxheath Road, Gally Hill Road, Sandy Lane, Bourley Road and Redfields Lane.

=== Geology ===
The geology the area forms part of the London Basin. The basin formed as a result of compressional tectonics related to the Alpine orogeny during the Palaeogene period and was mainly active between 40 and 60 million years ago. Fleet town is on the southern rim of the basin.

According to the British Geological Survey, the area around Fleet is predominantly composed of sand and gravel, including head gravel, sub-allevial and river terrace deposits. These are characteristics of the Bracklesham Group of the Bagshot Formation, which consists of shallow, sandy, slightly acidic soils, much of it boggy or covered in gorse and bracken. It held little use for agriculture compared to the long-grazed chalk lands and belts of alluvial areas of the rest of the county.

=== Nature ===
Most of Fleet town consists of extensive built-up areas, but there are also quite a few large areas set aside for nature, including Fleet Pond Nature Reserve, Bramshot Farm Country Park, Edenbrook Country Park, Hartland Country Park, Elvetham Heath Open Spaces and Local Nature Reserve (Elvetham Heath LNR), Ancells Farm Nature Reserve, Zebon Copse Local Nature Reserve (Zebon Copse LNR), Naishes Lane Suitable Alternative Natural Green Space (Naishes Lane SANGS). Beyond the eastern outskirts of the town, the area has been reserved for military use for over a hundred years, namely the Aldershot and Minley training areas. Although not formally designated for nature, the military presence has led to the planting of trees and the preservation of heathlands, which also serve as a barrier to urban development. Most of these areas are publicly accessible.

Apart from the large reserves, there are several significant urban parks with woodlands, including Calthorpe Park, Basingbourne Park, Oakley Park, Ancells Farm Park and Azalea Park.

=== Climate ===
Being located in South East England, Fleet has a temperate climate which is generally drier and warmer than the rest of the country. The annual mean temperature is approximately 9 °C (48.2 °F) and shows a seasonal and a diurnal variation. January is the coldest month with mean minimum temperatures between 0.5 and 2 °C (32.9 and 35.6 °F). July is the warmest month in the area with average daily maxima around 21 °C (69.8 °F). Rainfall averages at 600 millimetres (23.6 in).

== History ==
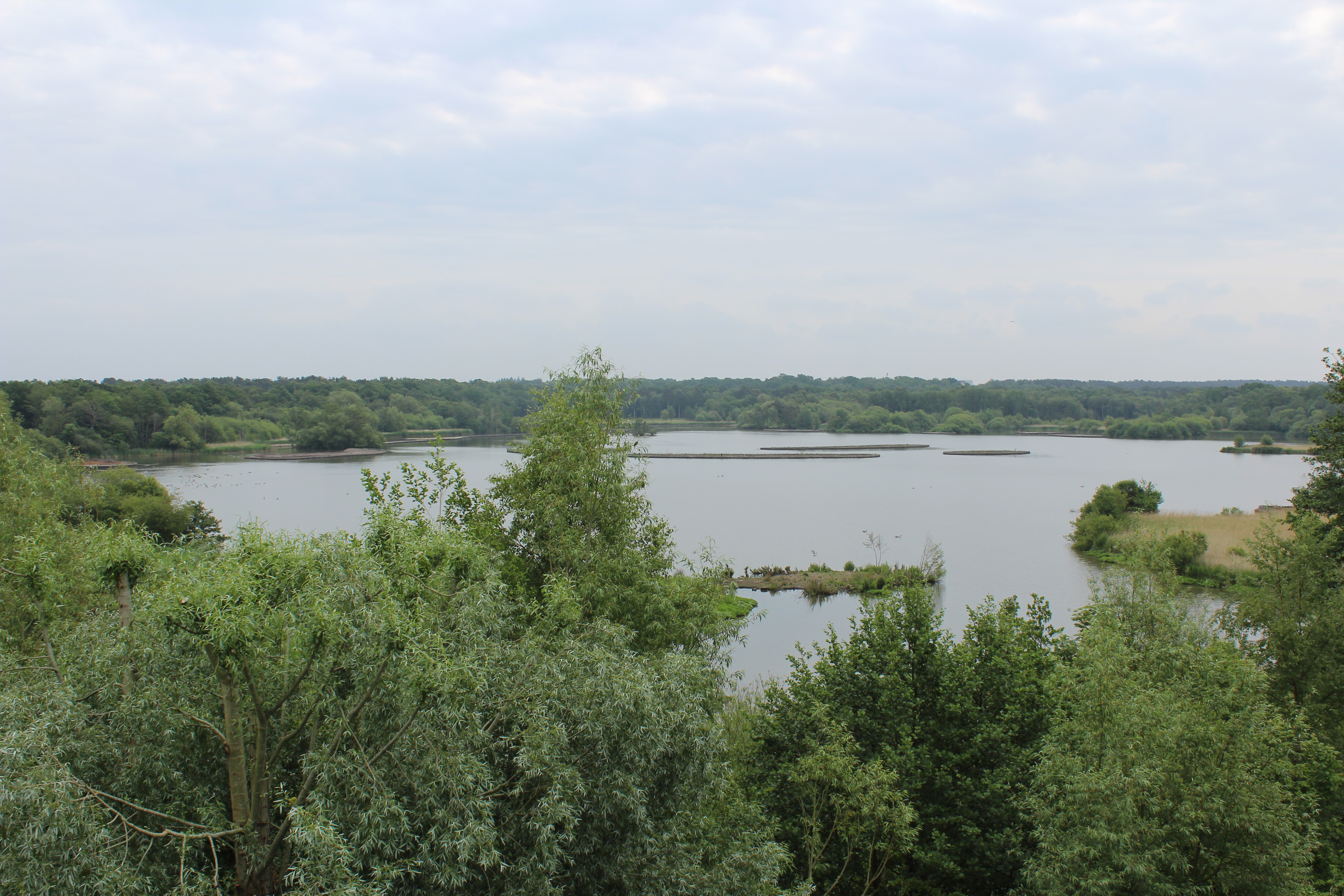
View of Fleet Pond. The railway line is about 100 metres to the left of the picture.

The Fleet area has yielded few archaeological finds. Some have speculated that the Fleet Pond was built by the Romans, and later Saxons named it Fuglemere, meaning "wildfowl lake".

Isaac Taylor's Map of Hampshire (1759) shows three small habitations in the area, namely Crookham Common, that was later to become Fleet.

The site of Fleet was originally heathland in the northern part of the Crondall Hundred. It either refers to Fleet Pond or a stream flowing north of the pond. The fish in the pond had been taken for the monks in Winchester in Medieval times.

According to Taylor's Map of 1759, the area now occupied by the town of Fleet was once uninhabited land known as Crookham Common, situated between the village of Crookham and Fleet Pond. Two streams ran into the pond and several road ran cross the surrounding wilderness. A range of hills separated the common from Aldershot Common in the east. At this time, Fleet Pond was divided into a large and a small pond by a road, long before the construction of the railway. To the north of the smaller pond stood Fleet Mill, and beyond that lay another range of hills, situated to the south of Yateley Heath.

In 1792, the Basingstoke Canal opened. The canal passed through the town site, but apart from a few inns to serve the passing trade, it had little effect on the locality. Apart from the Farnham to Reading road, the site remained largely undeveloped until the construction of the London and South Western Railway, which opened in 1840. In that year, a church - Christ Church, which was to become the heart of the new ecclesiastical parish of Crookham-cum-Ewshot was built midway between the villages of Crookham and Ewshot. This parish included the area that was later to become the separate town of Fleet. The railway company promoted Fleet Pond for a destination for day excursions, and many people came down from London to skate on the Pond during the Winter. This attracted a number of gentry, particularly retired army officers, who moved to the area bounded by Fleet Road, Elvetham Road and Reading Road North, and laid the foundations of what was to become known locally as "The Blue Triangle".

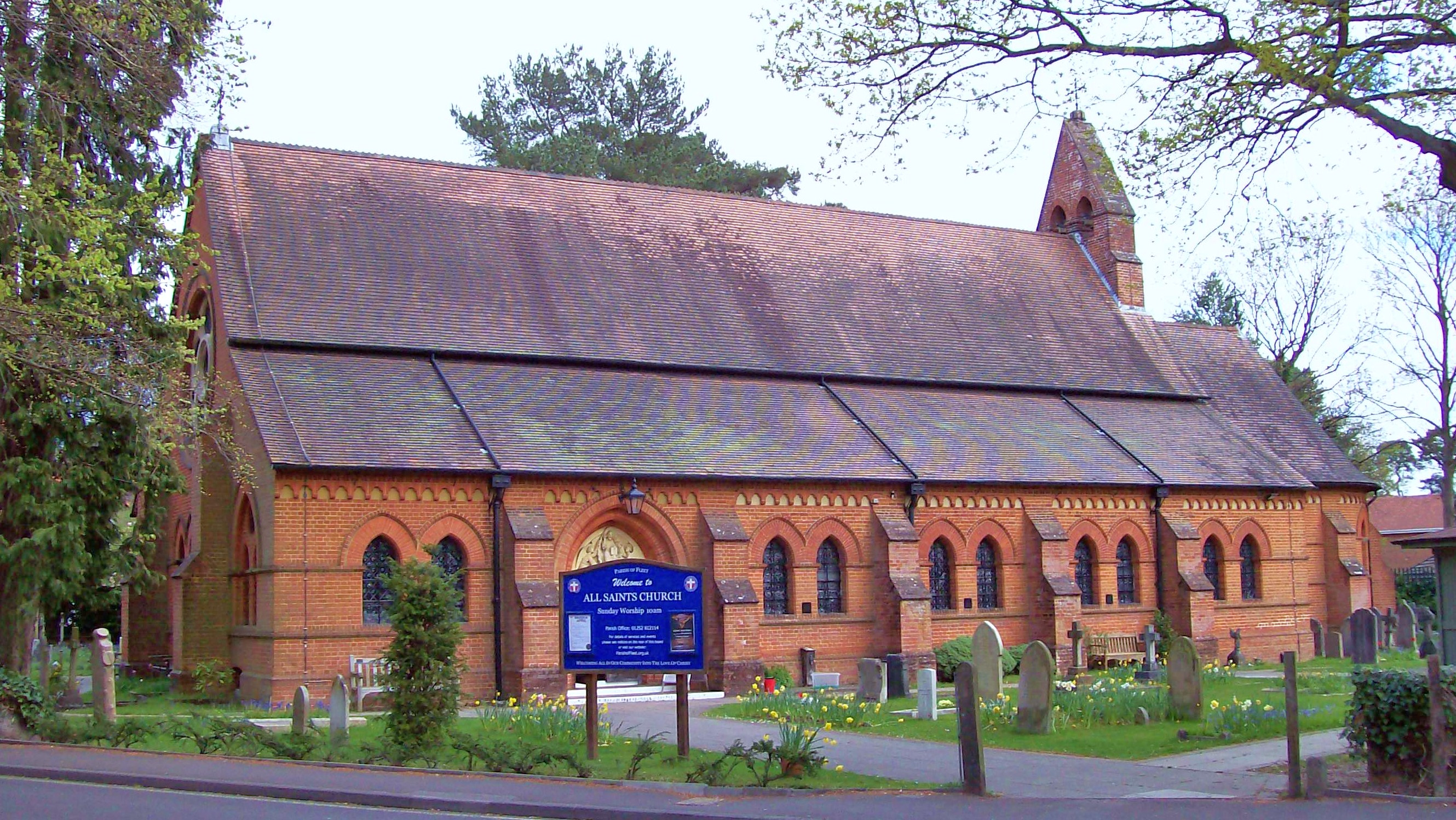
All Saints Church

By 1860, Charles Lefroy, a local squire, commissioned All Saints' Church – in the Blue Triangle area, in memory of his wife who had died in 1857. The architect was William Burges. The ecclesiastical parish of Crookham-cum-Ewshot was split into two in 1862, with the northern section based on All Saints' church becoming the new parish of Fleet. On 22 June 2015, the roof of All Saints' church was destroyed by fire following an arson attack. The church was returned to a condition where it could hold services by 30 April 2023 when it was reconsecrated.

The development of Fleet accelerated when the land to the south east of the Blue Triangle was sold for development in 1882. Development on this land was laid out in a grid pattern.

=== As part of the Urban District Council (1904 - 1974) ===
Under the Local Government Act 1894, many of the duties that had previously been shouldered by the ecclesiastical parishes were transferred to new civil parishes, and Crookham, Fleet and Crondall each gained an elected parish council. In 1904, Fleet became an urban district, just ten years after becoming an independent parish. In 1925, and again in 1932, it expanded by taking parts of Elvetham, as a result of the Local Government Act 1929, which saw smaller urban districts merge with their surrounding rural districts, with the result that new districts emerged covering rural as well as urban parishes. As a consequence, the Fleet Urban District in 1932 expanded south of the canal and took 45% of the Crookham acreage and 61% of the population, with the rump of the parish of Crookham being returned to Crondall parish. In addition, a small area of Minley with Hawley, that consequently became the modern development of Ancells Farm, was also transferred to the expanded Fleet Urban District.

=== As part of the Hart District Council (1974 onwards) ===
Fleet expanded over the decades, with new residential areas being built at Ancells Farm, Zebon Copse (Church Crookham, Crookham Village and Dogmersfield are included in the built-up area, as per the Government Statistical Service) and Elvetham Heath. Completed in 2008, Elvetham Heath was one of the UK's largest new housing developments at the time, and added some 3,500 inhabitants to Fleet's population, bringing its total population up to around 35,000. This represented a 20% population increase in less than a decade.

Earlier in the 1990s, two developments in Fleet involved a double opening on 10 May 1991; the Hart Shopping Centre, which was opened officially by the Duchess of York, and the old Hart Leisure Centre on Hitches Lane. The old Hart Leisure Centre was replaced by a new one on the other side of the road in 2019.

Fleet had been a dormitory town for commuters to London. It now has several business parks, mainly occupied by Information Technology companies.

== Politics and administration ==
Fleet is administered by Hart District Council and Hampshire County Council. The parliamentary constituency is North East Hampshire. In April 2010, some of the responsibilities of Hart District Council were devolved to three new parish councils: Fleet Town Council, Elvetham Heath Parish Council and Church Crookham Parish Council.

=== Wards ===
Fleet and Church Crookham are divided into the following wards:

Map of the electoral wards forming Fleet and Church Crookham.

- Fleet Central: Small part of the "Blue Triangle" the late Victorian/Edwardian town centre, and a small part south of the canal that was historically part of Crookham prior to 1976.
- Fleet East: Pondtail, Ancells Farm and the former Pyestock site (Hartland Village).
- Fleet West: Large part of the "Blue Triangle", Elvetham Heath and Edenbrook.
- Crookham East: Church Crookham estates, Velmead and the Sandy Lane Triangle.
- Crookham West and Ewshot: Gally Hill, Zebon, Tweseldown, Crookham Park (formerly Queen Elizabeth Barracks), Crookham and Ewshot villages.

== Demography ==
Men in the Fleet North ward had the second highest life expectancy at birth, 89.7 years, of any ward in England and Wales in 2016.

== Transport ==
=== Railway ===
The town is served by Fleet railway station, which is a stop on the South West Main Line between London Waterloo and Southampton Central. Services are operated by South Western Railway. The standard journey time to Waterloo is about 50 minutes, with express trains achieving around 40 minutes.

=== Buses ===
Routes are operated by Stagecoach South, providing local routes and facilitating access to surrounding towns such as route no. 10 to Farnborough and route no. 7 to Aldershot.

Fleet Connect is a special bus service in Fleet town, operated by Rushmoor Voluntary Services and supported by related councils. The service is designed for those who are unable to drive and with difficulty reaching bus stops. It provides transport to locations such as the High Street (Fleet Road), Morrisons in Elvetham Heath, Redfields Garden Centre and medical appointments within the town. There are special services to The Meadows and Camberley on Wednesdays, and to Sainsbury's, Asda, B&Q, and other locations in Farnborough on the first Thursday of each month.

=== Road ===
Fleet is served by junction 4A of the M3 motorway. Fleet services lies at the edge of the town and is owned by Welcome Break; it was the only service station on the M3 until Winchester services was built in 2001.

Fleet's main road, Fleet Road, runs through the town centre from south-west to north-east.

=== Air ===
Fleet town does not have its own airport. Nearby airports, such as Blackbushe Airport in Yateley and Farnborough Airport in Farnborough, do not provide general passenger services. The nearest major airport is Heathrow Airport. Additionally, the Royal Air Force operates RAF Odiham in Odiham, a few miles to the west.

=== Canal ===
The Basingstoke Canal, built at the end of the eighteenth century, connected Fleet to Basingstoke and, in the other direction, London via the Wey navigation. By the early twentieth century, the canal had fallen into disrepair; the section between the Wey Navigation and the Greywell Tunnel has since been restored by volunteers and is maintained as a leisure facility.

== Education ==
Schools in Fleet are generally under the administration of Hampshire County Council. Education in Fleet Town consists of infant schools, junior schools and secondary schools, but there is no sixth form provision locally. The nearest sixth form provider is The Sixth Form College Farnborough. Students pursuing further education must attend schools outside the town. In addition, there are numerous pre-school education establishments in the form of pre-schools or nurseries.

The following list of schools is categorised and arranged alphabetically.

=== Infant schools ===
An infant school is a school that includes Reception year (Year R) and Years 1 and 2, catering for children aged four to seven years old. Year R follows the Early Years Foundation Stage (EYFS), while Years 1 and 2 fall under Key Stage 1 of the National Curriculum.

==== Crookham Church of England Aided Infant School ====
Crookham Church of England Aided Infant School, commonly referred to as Crookham CE Aided Infant School, is a voluntary aided primary school, registered as number 2229 with the Department for Education.

Located on Gally Hill Road, at the junction with Ferndale Road in Church Crookham, it is a Church of England aided school under Diocese of Guildford and is affiliated with the nearby Christ Church Crookham. It is situated next to Church Crookham War Memorial, directly opposite across Gally Hill Road.

The school does not have a designated catchment area, as admissions are determined by its own policy. The school is linked to Church Crookham Junior School, and attending the infant school provides priority for admission to the junior school.

==== Fleet Infant School ====
Fleet Infant School is a community primary school located on Velmead Road, registered as number 2270 with the Department for Education. Its motto is: "To try is to achieve, to achieve is to grow."

The school has a charity, the Fleet Infant School Association (FISA), a parent-teacher association registered for fundraising purposes under charity number 1107909 since 2 February 2005.

A significant part of the school grounds is woodland, which enables pupils to take part in forest school activities. The site is shared with Velmead Junior School and is adjacent to the woodland of Velmead Common, which forms part of the Aldershot and Minley training area and is accessible to the public under Ministry of Defence access arrangements.

The school is linked to Velmead Junior School, and attending the infant school provides priority for admission to the junior school.

The school was the first to be established in Fleet (referring to Fleet parish), beginning in a small cottage on the north side of All Saints Church and founded by the Church of England. It was later housed in a Victorian building on Albert Street, which fell into disrepair in its later years. According to the Hampshire Archives, the school was known as Fleet County Infant School between 1970 and 1998. Hopkins Architects also recorded Fleet County Infant School in 1985, when the new school project commenced. In January 1987, the school relocated to a new site on Velmead Road.

The school building, although relatively new, has been designated as a Grade II listed building under the name Fleet Infant School on 6 October 2017. Originally, the new school project named Fleet Velmead Infant School.

Although situated on the northern border of Church Crookham parish, the school's catchment area does not include any residential areas within that parish. Instead, it primarily covers both residential and non-residential areas in the north and east of Fleet parish, as well as some non-residential areas in the parishes of Blackwater and Hawley, as well as Hartley Wintney. It includes a small zone around the school on Velmead Road and covers several residential areas, such as Pondtail, parts of the east and west of Fleet Road in the town centre, Elvetham Road, and Ancells Farm. It also includes some non-residential areas, such as North Hants Golf Club and Bramshot Country Park. The area extends further north beyond the M3 motorway, reaching the A30 and Pale Lane, and stretches eastwards to include land north of Old Ively Road within Cody Technology Park.

==== Heatherside Infant School ====
Heatherside Infant School is a community primary school located on Reading Road South, next to the Basingstoke Canal, registered as number 2269 with the Department for Education. It shared the site with Heathside Junior School, and attending the infant school provides priority for admission to the junior school. Heatherside Schools' Association (HSA) is it parent-teacher association.

The school was formerly known as Heatherside County Infant School, but its location was later swapped with that of Heatherside County Junior School.

Its catchment area includes the surrounding locality, part of Fleet parish bounded by the Basingstoke Canal and extending southwards to Award Road, as well as part of western Church Crookham parish bounded by Reading Road South and Aldershot Road, reaching into the uninhabited Velmead Common.

==== Tavistock Infant School ====
Tavistock Infant School is a community primary school located on Broadacres, Calthorpe Park, registered as number 2324 with the Department for Education. It shared the site with All Saints Junior School but does not have any linked schools.

The school was originally known as North Fleet County Infant School when it opened on 17 April 1972. Upon its official opening on Friday 29 June 1973, it was renamed Tavistock County Infant School due to its proximity to Tavistock Road.

Its catchment area includes western Fleet town up to Elvetham Road, Edenbrook, and Hareshill. It also covers a triangular area of Paleland Farm across the railway, the residential area to the south bounded by the Basingstoke Canal, and a patch of shared catchment area across the canal between Basingbourn Park and Zebon Copse. Hareshill originated from the Grove Farm development. When this farmland was converted into a residential area, the school catchment changed from Dogmersfield Church of England Primary School to Tavistock Infant School and All Saints Junior School following a proposal in September 2021.

==== Tweseldown Infant School ====
Tweseldown Infant School is a community primary school located on Jubilee Drive inside Crookham Park, registered as number 2290 with the Department for Education. The school offers forest school activities as part of its curriculum.

The school was formerly located on Tweseldown Road, sharing a site with Crookham Junior School, from which it took its name. Around January 2012, it relocated to Crookham Park, adjacent to Nepal Gardens. This move allowed Crookham Junior School to expand into the former infant school premises.

Its catchment area covers most of Church Crookham, bordered to the north by Award Road, Reading Road South, and Aldershot Road, extending south beyond Crookham Park, west to Zebon Copse and Redfields, and east to the military training area.

=== Junior schools ===
A junior school is a school that includes Years 3, 4, 5, and 6, catering for children aged seven to eleven years old. All four year groups fall under Key Stage 2 of the National Curriculum.

==== All Saints Church of England Aided Junior School ====
All Saints Church of England Aided Junior School, commonly referred to as All Saints Junior School, is a voluntary aided primary school located on Leawood Road, registered as number 3330 with the Department for Education. It shared the site with Tavistock Infant School, which was located on the junior school's former playground.

It is a Church of England aided school under Diocese of Guildford and is affiliated with the All Saints Church in the same town within the parish of Fleet.

As of December 2023, it has been 150 years since four members of the church established the Fleet Church School, which eventually became the junior school. As a result, a very close relationship exists between the school and the church.

Its catchment area includes western Fleet town up to Elvetham Road, Edenbrook, and Hareshill. It also covers a triangular area of Paleland Farm across the railway, the residential area to the south bounded by the Basingstoke Canal, and a patch of shared catchment area across the canal between Basingbourn Park and Zebon Copse. Hareshill originated from the Grove Farm development. When this farmland was converted into a residential area, the school catchment changed from Dogmersfield Church of England Primary School to Tavistock Infant School and All Saints Junior School following a proposal in September 2021.

==== Church Crookham Junior School ====
Church Crookham Junior School is a community primary school located on Tweseldown Road, registered as number 2229 with the Department for Education.

The school was formerly known by several names, including Church Crookham County Junior School, Crookham County Junior School, Crookham Junior School, and informally as Sandy Lane, after the nearby road.

Tweseldown Infant School was built on the playground of Crookham County Junior School. Around January 2012, the infant school was relocated to Crookham Park. This move allowed the junior school to expand into the former infant school premises.

ts catchment area covers most of Church Crookham, bordered to the north by Award Road, Reading Road South, and Aldershot Road, extending south beyond Crookham Park, west to Zebon Copse and Redfields, and east to the military training area.

==== Heatherside Junior School ====
Heatherside Junior School is a community primary school located on Reading Road South, registered as number 2278 with the Department for Education. It shared the site with Heathside Infant School.

The school was formerly known as Heatherside County Junior School, but its location was later swapped with that of Heatherside County Infant School.

Its catchment area includes the surrounding locality, part of Fleet parish bounded by the Basingstoke Canal and extending southwards to Award Road, as well as part of western Church Crookham parish bounded by Reading Road South and Aldershot Road, reaching into the uninhabited Velmead Common.

==== Velmead Junior School ====
Velmead Junior School is a community primary school located on Velmead Road, registered as number 2339 with the Department for Education. It shared the site with Fleet Infant School.

Although situated on the northern border of Church Crookham parish, the school's catchment area does not include any residential areas within that parish. Instead, it primarily covers both residential and non-residential areas in the north and east of Fleet parish, as well as some non-residential areas in the parishes of Blackwater and Hawley, as well as Hartley Wintney. It includes a small zone around the school on Velmead Road and covers several residential areas, such as Pondtail, parts of the east and west of Fleet Road in the town centre, Elvetham Road, and Ancells Farm. It also includes some non-residential areas, such as North Hants Golf Club and Bramshot Country Park. The area extends further north beyond the M3 motorway, reaching the A30 and Pale Lane, and stretches eastwards to include land north of Old Ively Road within Cody Technology Park.

=== Primary school ===
A primary school is a school that includes the Reception year (Year R) and Years 1 to 6, catering for children aged four to eleven years old. Year R follows the Early Years Foundation Stage, Years 1 and 2 fall under Key Stage 1, and Years 3 to 6 are part of Key Stage 2.

==== Elvetham Heath Primary School ====
Elvetham Heath Primary School is a community primary school located on The Key, Elvetham Heath, registered as number 2015 with the Department for Education. The school opened on 1 September 2001.

As the only school in the civil parish of Elvetham Heath, its catchment area covers the entire parish.

=== Secondary schools ===
A secondary school is a school that includes Years 7 to 11, catering for children aged eleven to sixteen years old. Years 7 to 9 fall under Key Stage 3, while Years 10 and 11 are part of Key Stage 4 of the National Curriculum.

==== Calthorpe Park School ====
Calthorpe Park School is a community secondary school located on Hitches Lane, registered as number 4171 with the Department for Education.

The school was built between 1967 and 1968, and opened on Wednesday, 3 September 1969, under the name North Fleet Bilateral School. It was soon renamed Calthorpe Park School, with the official opening taking place on Friday, 18 June 1971. In 1974, two additional blocks were constructed alongside Hart Leisure Centre. Between 2015 and 2019, further buildings were added following the relocation of the leisure centre westwards to Edenbrook.

Its linked schools include All Saints Church of England Aided Junior School, Church Crookham Junior School, Crondall Primary School, Dogmersfield Church of England Primary School, Elvetham Heath Primary School, Heatherside Junior School and Velmead Junior School. Attendance at a linked school may provide priority for admission to this school.

==== Court Moor School ====
Court Moor School is a community secondary school located on Spring Woods, registered as number 4117 with the Department for Education.

The school began in a temporary structure in Heatherside in January 1949, known as Fleet Secondary Modern School. In 1957, Hampshire County Council purchased land and built a new school building. The school moved to the new site in January 1960 and was officially opened as Court Moor School on 11 May 1960. Additional blocks have been constructed over the years to accommodate growing needs.

Its linked schools include Crondall Primary School, Church Crookham Junior School, Heatherside Junior School, Velmead Junior School, Dogmersfield Church of England Primary School, and All Saints Church of England Aided Junior School. Attendance at a linked school may support priority admission to this school.

=== Others ===
==== St Nicholas' School ====
St Nicholas' School is an independent girls' school located in Redfields House on Redfields Lane, offering nursery, infant, junior, and senior education, but without a sixth form. The school was established on Branksomewood Road in Fleet town centre by Helen Pritchard and Angela McKenzie in 1935. It is named after Saint Nicholas, the Patron Saint of children and seafarers. In 1952, the motto "Confirma Domine Serviendo", meaning "Strengthen us, Lord, by our service", was adopted. In 1996, the school moved to Redfields House in Church Crookham. Redfields House is a Victorian mansion, and the new site encompasses 30 acres of land.

== Healthcare ==
The National Health Service (NHS) operates Fleet Hospital, also known as Fleet Community Hospital, in the town, under Frimley Health NHS Foundation Trust. Opened in 1897, it provides a range of healthcare services to the local community, but does not offer Accident and Emergency (A&E) service. Patients requiring emergency care are transported to the nearest A&E hospital, Frimley Park Hospital in Surrey. Services at Fleet Hospital include breast surgery, dermatology, diabetic medicine, ear, nose and throat (ENT), endocrinology and metabolic medicine, gastrointestinal and liver services, geriatric medicine, gynaecology, nephrology, and rheumatology. The hospital also offers outpatient services, physiotherapy, and X-ray facilities, and general surgery, heart failure service, imaging, older people's medicine, orthotics (surgical appliances), pain management, radiology, speech and language therapy, surgical appliances, ultrasound, vascular ultrasound, and X-ray (plain film imaging). Additionally, it serves as the base for local community healthcare services.

South Central Ambulance Service provides ambulance cover in the town in response to NHS 111 call and emergency 999 call.

== Religion ==
=== Christianity ===
The dominant religion in the town is Christianity, with several denominations represented. Before Fleet developed into a town, Christians would travel to Crondall Parish Church to worship. In addition to the Anglican Church, there was a growing number of people with evangelical beliefs, known as dissenters, in the surrounding villages.

In 1840, the Southern Railway opened a station near Fleet Pond, close to Fleet Pond Village. With the influx of day-trippers from London, the local population began to grow. In response to the need for a church in the area, the first church, Christ Church, was established by Charles Edward Lofroy, a local landlord, and was opened on 31 August 1841. A new Anglican parish was created.

Around the same time in the 1840s, near what is now Fleet town centre, William Webster, a Baptist, purchased a plot of land close to Reading Road North. In 1846, he completed his house, Hope House (now known as Cedar House, named after a 500-year-old cedar tree), which he converted into a Baptist meeting place and a boarding school. In 1849, Hope Chapel, initially known as Crookham Chapel, was built in a neighbouring house. Then, in 1858, a new chapel was constructed on the west side of the burial ground, which is now known as Hope Cemetery.

In 1859, T. Spurgin built another chapel nearby on Reading Road North, known as Fleet Pond Chapel, at a time when Fleet town centre was still referred to as Fleet Pond Village. This chapel was later renamed Ebenezer Chapel.

By 1860, Charles Edward Lofroy constructed another Anglican church in Fleet town. As Fleet expanded, a new parish was formed in 1862.

In 1892, the Baptists established a new chapel, Fleet Road Chapel.

==== Church of England ====
The Church of England, also known as the Anglican Church, serves Fleet town, which is divided into two parishes: the Parish of Fleet and the Parish of Crookham, both within the Surrey Archdeaconry under the Diocese of Guildford. The Parish of Fleet is home to All Saints Church and St Philip and St James Church, while the Parish of Crookham is served by Christ Church.

The Church runs two schools in the town: All Saints Church of England Aided Junior School and Crookham Church of England Aided Infant School.

==== Roman Catholic Church ====
The parish of Our Lady and The Holy Trinity is within the Deanery of Blessed John Body, under the Catholic Diocese of Portsmouth. There comprises two churches: The Church of Our Lady in Fleet and The Church of The Holy Trinity in Church Crookham.

The Church of Our Lady originated from a small church built on King's Road in 1908. It was expanded in 1934 and again in 1948. A new church building was opened on 25 March 1966.

The Church of the Holy Trinity began on Moore Road in 1958. In 1960, the church purchased its current site on Aldershot Road. The new church was opened in 1968.

==== Baptist church ====
The first church on Crookham Common, later known as Fleet Pond Village and now Fleet Town Centre, was Hope Chapel, established in 1946 for dissenters. Initially called Hope House, it was the residence of William Webster, a boarding school, and a meeting place for Baptists.

In 1859, Fleet Pond Chapel, later known as Ebenzer, was built nearby. The two chapels eventually merged, and in 1892, Fleet Road Chapel was constructed.

In 1957, Crookham Baptist Church opened on Basingbourne Road, and in 1965, Fleet Baptist Church relocated to a new building on Clarence Road. Today, these congregations are known as Fleet Baptist Church and Church Crookham Baptist Church.

==== Methodist church ====
The first Methodist church in the town was the New Primitive Methodist Church, also known as Reading Road Chapel, situated in Church Crookham on Reading Road South, roughly where Fleet Methodist Church is located today. It was established in 1883. Around the same time, the Wesleyan Methodist Church, also known as Wesleyan Church, was founded in 1887 at the corner of Branksomewood Road and Fleet Road. Originally a wooden building, it was reconstructed in brick in 1899. The two churches united in 1963, and a new Fleet Methodist Church was opened on an adjacent site in 1972.

==== United Reformed Church ====
The United Reformed Church was formed in 1972 through the union of the Congregational Church and the Presbyterian Church. In Fleet, a Congregational Church was founded in 1912, with the building commencing in 1913 and opening in July 1914. When the United Reformed Church was formed in 1972, it became Fleet United Reformed Church.

==== Multi-denomination ====
In Elvetham Heath, Church on the Heath is a partnership of Anglican, Methodist, Baptist, and United Reformed churches.

=== Other religions ===
==== Spiritualist church ====
Fleet Spiritualist Church

== Culture ==
=== The Harlington ===
The Harlington, also known as (The) Harlington Centre or Fleet Civic Centre, situated between Fleet Road and Harlington Way, is the two-storey civic centre in the town centre. Next to Fleet Library, the centre serves as a venue for arts and entertainment, as well as community functions. It consists of an auditorium, a dance studio, a function room and a bar.

In 1956, Fleet Carnival for fundraising was revived for a new civic centre. It was built in 1972 as a civic complex, offering meeting rooms, offices, and a main hall, with a library separate library building. Following a fire that destroyed the roof in May 1991, the centre was renovated in 1993 and integrated with the library building. The new name, The Harlington Centre, was chosen as the result of a local competition. The civic centre, together with Fleet Library, was reopened on 1 November 1994, with two single-storey extensions added for Fleet Phoenix and the Royal Voluntary Service. In 1997, a small split-level gymnasium was added. Fleet Town Council took over management from Hart District Council under a short-term lease in 2010 and secured a 99-year long-term lease in March 2025. The centre was rebranded as The Harlington and refocused on entertainment and community activities. However, the centre has struggled with building defects and keeping up to modern standards. Various renovation proposals are under review as of 2025.

=== Fleet Library ===
Fleet Library is the only public library in the town, operated by Hampshire County Council. It is situated at 236 Fleet Road, behind Gurkha Square and adjacent to The Harlington. In addition to the conventional functions of a public library, such as borrowing books and magazines, it also serves as a community hub, offering meetings and courses for people from all walks of life. The library has a section dedicated to the local history collection from the Fleet and Crookham Local History Group.

The first library in the town, The Fleet Library, was a private establishment dating back to 1905 and was located at 171 Fleet Road. The library was for-profit, also serving as a printing office and ticketing office. Miss Isabel Caley was the first librarian. The library closed in 1955. There were other library businesses in the town.

Colonel Horniblow donated a piece of land, known as The Views (Meadow), to the county council. In 1936, the council also purchased a house from him and converted it into a council office, with a small library section.

On 24 March 1947, a new, though tiny, council library was opened at 236 Fleet Road (the same house number as now, but at a different location). By 1955, the library was in high demand, leading to discussions about fundraising for a civic centre. In 1956, Fleet Carnival for fundraising was revived for and Fleet Chamber of Trade agreed to sponsor the carnival.

In 1952, Fleet Urban Council acquired Chernocke House, the land of which is now Gurkha Square. By that time, the house had been divided into four sections, with number 4 being occupied by Fleet Bridge Club. In November 1957, the council raised the rent to make way for a new tenant, the library. The club moved to West View in 1958, and in 1959, the building hosted the new Fleet County Library. In February 1963, the library received an extension, courtesy of a tenant. On 8 August 1963, the library reopened with the new extension.

In 1967, discussions commenced for the construction of a new civic centre, which was eventually completed in 1972, just behind Chernocke House. On 31 January 1974, the Hampshire Fleet Library moved into the civic centre at current location, being housed in a separate building. One room within the civic centre was named Carnival Hall, in recognition of the carnival's contribution of a tenth of the funding. Another room, named Chernocke Hall, honoured Chernocke House, the library's former home. In 1975, Chernocke House was demolished.

In May 1991, the assembly halls in the civic centre were severely damaged by a fire. Although there were initial plans to rebuild it in Calthorpe Park, residents ultimately opted for reconstruction on the original site. In 1993, Hart District Council proposed that the new civic centre would be integrated with the library building. The project was developed in collaboration with both Hart District Council and Hampshire County Council. The library was renovated and reopened on 1 November 1994, alongside The Harlington Centre, a new name chosen through a local competition. The library's new entrance, which is now closed, was previously located inside The Harlington Centre.

Fleet Library celebrated its 50th anniversary in January 2024.

=== Events ===
The town has numerous events organised by the local carnival committee, the largest of those being Fleet Carnival in the summer, and the switching on of the Christmas lights as December approaches (known as Fleet Festivities), usually held the last Wednesday in November and taking place along the main street (Fleet Road), which is pedestrianised for the evening's events. The committee also arrange food festivals, attracting stands run by local restaurants and talks and demonstrations held in large marquees.

Other yearly events in Fleet include a Half Marathon, Fleet 10K, a beer festival organised by the local Lions Club and a Fireworks night.

Gurkha Square, named after the Gurkhas who were based in Fleet for many years, houses the Fleet war memorial. A market takes place every Saturday in Gurkha Square. Major buildings on Gurkha Square are Fleet Library, and the Harlington Centre.

== Heritage ==
The following buildings are listed on the National Heritage List for England:

- Great Bramshot Farmhouse, Grade II.
- Palelane Farmhouse, Grade II.
- Church of All Saints, Grade II*.
- Fleet War Memorial, Grade II.
- Fleet Infant School, Grade II.
- Church Crookham War Memorial, Grade II.
- Christ Church, Grade II*.
- The Old Horns, Grade II.
- Velmead Farmhouse, Grade II.
- Meadow View Cottage, Grade II.
- Stiller's Farmhouse, Grade II.
- Saddling Stables to the west of the road at Tweseldown Racecourse, Grade II.
- Saddling Stables to the east of the road at Tweseldown Racecourse, Grade II.
- Hay Barn at Tweseldown Racecourse, Grade II.
- Offices at Tweseldown Racecourse, Grade II.
- Grandstand and Jockey Quarters at Tweseldown Racecourse, Grade II.
- Underpass at Tweseldown Racecourse, Grade II.
- Barn to south of Stillers Farmhouse, Grade II.
- Grove Farmhouse, Grade II.
- Granary at Grove Farm, Grade II.
- Malthouse Bridge, Grade II.
- Brunley, Grade II.
- West View Cottage and Grove View, Grade II.
- Forge House, Grade II.
- Forge, Grade II.
- Laurel Cottage, Grade II.
- Westbrook and Lavender, Grade II.
- The Baun, Grade II.
- Cedar Cottage, Grade II.
- Vuname and Grove, Grade II.
- No 1, 2 and 3 Cross Farm Cottages, Grade II.
- Poulter's Bridge, Grade II.

In the civil parish of Fleet, more buildings of heritage and townscape value are listed:

- 12 Minley Road (The Old Station Master's House)
- 22 to 40 Minley Road (Beulah, Broughton, Grateley, Hermon and Hawley Villas)
- 37 King's Road (Benson House)
- 1 to 25 Dunmow Hill
- 4 Avondale Road (The Grey House)
- 277 to 279 Fleet Road
- 295 to 297 Fleet Road
- 315 to 337 Fleet Road
- 35 Chestnut Grove (Grasmere)
- 69 to 79 Connaught Road (Stocks Cottages)
- 47 Connaught Road (Lady Bower)
- 51 to 57 Fleet Road (The Terrace)
- Brake's Estate Office, Fleet Road
- 271 to 275 Fleet Road (The Old Emporium)
- 140 to 148 Fleet Road
- 150 Fleet Road(The old Post Office)
- 152 to 158 Fleet Road
- 238 Fleet Road (The Prince Arthur)
- 240 Fleet Road
- 234 Fleet Road (was 238, Bakers)
- 182 to 184 Fleet Road
- 174 Fleet Road
- 67 and 69 Victoria Road (The Garth)
- The Bailey, Branksomewood Road
- High Bank (Buena Vista), Hagley Road
- Beacon House, Victoria Hill Road
- Fleet Hospital, Church Road
- 35 Church Road (Alvercote)
- 36 and 38 Church Road
- Lismoyne Hotel, Church Road
- The Courtyard, Waverley Avenue
- Stockton House, Stockton Avenue
- 5 Knoll Road (East Dene and West Dene)
- 31 Elvetham Road (Stockton Lodge)
- The Manor, Branksomewood Road
- 2 and 4 Reading Road South (The Water Sky)
- The Oatsheaf, Crookham Road
- 20 Crookham Road (Stanton House)
- Fox and Hounds, Crookham Road
- 45 and 47 Reading Road South
- 1 Dinorben Avenue
- Prince of Wales, Reading Road South

== Sport and leisure ==
Hart Leisure Centre at Edenbrook is a major venue for both indoor and outdoor sports. It features an indoor swimming pool, a fully equipped gym, sports halls for badminton and basketball, fitness studios, and outdoor pitches for football and rugby. The centre also offers a variety of classes and community sports programmes for all ages and abilities.

Fleet has a number of recreation grounds scattered across different parts of the town. Fleet Town Council manages The Views Meadow, Calthorpe Park, Oakley Park, Basingbourne Park, and Ancells Park. Church Crookham Parish Council is responsible for the Peter Driver Sports Ground, located on the boundary between Church Crookham and Ewshot. Elvetham Heath has an informal recreation ground.

Several sports clubs operate within the Fleet end of Cody Technology Park.

Some schools in the town have large recreation grounds, which are also available for community use.

=== Equestrianism ===
Tweseldown Racecourse is main venue for equestrianism.

=== Golf ===
Fleet is the home of the North Hants Golf Club. For over one hundred years, it has been a top-ranked course in Hampshire and nationally. Justin Rose was a junior member of the club, and there is now a meeting room named after him.

=== Football ===
Fleet has two Non-League football teams: Fleet Town F.C. and Fleet Spurs F.C.

=== Cricket ===
Fleet Cricket Club is in Calthorpe Park.

=== Athletics ===
Church Crookham Athletics Track.

=== Bowling Green ===
Fleet Social & Bowling Club and Fleet United Bowling Club.

=== Marathon ===
Fleet has a half marathon, commonly used in preparation for the London Marathon, and an athletics club, Fleet & Crookham AC.

== Media ==
Formerly, the local press are the Fleet News & Mail, a broadsheet available in local shops, and the Surrey-Hants Star Courier, a free tabloid delivered to the door. Instead, Fleet CommunityAd Magazine, a free publication, is released irregularly from 2022, with several issues per year, and delivered directly to residents' doors.

Fleet Local news and television programmes are provided by BBC South and ITV Meridian. Television signals are received from the Hannington TV transmitter, some areas of the town can also pick up a signal from the Crystal Palace TV transmitter that broadcast BBC London and ITV London. Fleet is covered by BBC Radio Surrey and Greatest Hits Radio Surrey and North East Hampshire which both radio stations covers North-East Hampshire additionally.

== Notable people ==
- The actress Juliet Aubrey was born in Fleet in 1966.
- The musician Tim Battersby was born in Fleet in 1949.
- Helen Bauer, comedian, is from Fleet.
- Air Vice Marshall Cecil Bouchier was born in Fleet in 1895.
- The New Zealand lawyer and naturalist Walter Buller died in Fleet in 1906.
- The actress Raquel Cassidy was born in Fleet in 1968.
- The musician and author Alan Clayson grew up in Fleet.
- The racing driver Jac Constable, who won the AM class of the Ginetta GT4 Supercup in 2018 grew up and lives in Fleet.
- Civil engineer Peter Chalmers Cowan lived and died in Fleet.
- Murder victim Marion Crofts lived in Fleet.
- Green Party MP Carla Denyer attended Calthorpe Park School in the town.
- Roy Dommett (d 2015), aeronautical scientist and Morris dancer lived in Fleet for much of his working life and also during his retirement.
- The magazine editor, journalist and broadcaster Mark Ellen grew up in Fleet.
- The professional tennis player John Feaver was born in Fleet in 1952.
- Sir Carron Greig died in Fleet on 11 July 2012, aged 87.
- Patrick Hannan, drummer in The Sundays, was born in Fleet.
- The professional footballer Keith Hooker was born in Fleet in 1950.
- The platform diver Gemma McArthur, competitor for Team Scotland in the 2018 Commonwealth Games, is from Fleet.
- The racing driver Jack Mitchell, who won the GT4 class of the British GT Championship in 2018 lives in Fleet.
- The golfer Justin Rose was a member of the North Hants Golf Club in Fleet.
- The art critic and man of letters, John Russell, was born in Fleet in 1919.
- The racing driver Dan Welch, who competed in the British Touring Car Championship between 2011 and 2018 lives in Fleet.
- Mabel Wickham, landscape artist, was born in Fleet in 1901.

== Freedom of the Town ==
The following people or military units have received the Freedom of the Town of Fleet.

=== Individuals ===
- Geoffrey "Geoff" Baker: 22 March 2022.

== See also ==
- Basingstoke Canal
