= Fleet Services =

English motorway service station

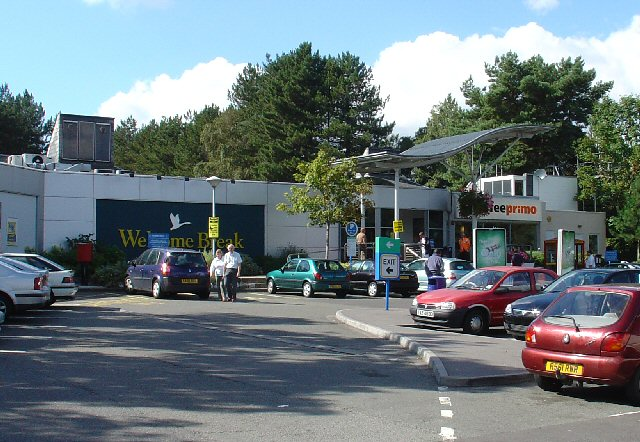
- Original southbound building pictured in 2005

- Location within Hampshire

Information
- County: Hampshire
- Road: M3
- Coordinates: 51.2948°N 0.8555°W
- Operator: Welcome Break
- Date opened: 6 June 1973
- Website: welcomebreak.co.uk/locations/fleet/

Fleet Services is a motorway service station on the M3 near Fleet. It is operated by Welcome Break. The east and west bound services are connected by a footbridge.

== History ==
Outline permission was given in January 1972. Construction started in February 1972 by Sydney Green & Sons.

The site opened on Wednesday 6 June 1973 at 10.15am. The first customers were a coach from Esher travelling west, who arrived at 10.25am. It was originally built in a Scandinavian style and in 1992 won Loo of the Year Award. Before 2001, when Winchester services opened, it was the only service station on the M3.

In 2006, it was one of the first service stations to carry the new corporate identity for Welcome Break, and along with it came a new Burger King franchise, which then made Fleet Services one of the few motorway service stations to have a Burger King, a KFC and a McDonald's co-exist at the same service station. The McDonald's was part of a 1995 Welcome Break campaign to roll out franchises throughout its chain, but when Welcome Break's parent company was taken over by Granada, the latter's rival franchise of Burger King was instead introduced throughout the chain, but Fleet services (and Woodall), part of the original plan, continued to carry McDonald's despite this. However, the McDonald's closed in March 2020, owing to licensing agreements.

=== Scott Mills Bridge ===
The footbridge was officially named the Scott Mills Bridge on 16 March 2016. The naming followed a campaign by the Scott Mills Show's co-presenter Chris Stark to get things named after the BBC Radio 1 presenter. A plaque was unveiled at the site by Stark. The plaque was removed in 2026 following Mills' dismissal from the BBC.

=== 2016 fire ===
A large fire broke out at the southbound site, caused by a faulty coffee machine in KFC on the evening of 14 December 2016, damaging at least 60% of the building but not resulting in any human injuries. The southbound carriageway of the M3 was closed and more than 100 firefighters attended from Hampshire and Surrey. A customer on site at the time the fire broke out said it appeared to have started in a coffee machine and that staff reacted slowly.

== Structure ==
The eastbound side is in Hartley Wintney, and the westbound side is in Elvetham Heath. The parish boundary is the central reservation of the M3.

A temporary building opened on 23 March 2017 to serve as the southbound services whilst the fire damaged building was demolished and rebuilt. The rebuilt services building opened on 6 September 2018.

| Previous: None | Motorway service stations on the M3 motorway | Next: Winchester |
