= Fleet Brook =

River in northern Hampshire, England

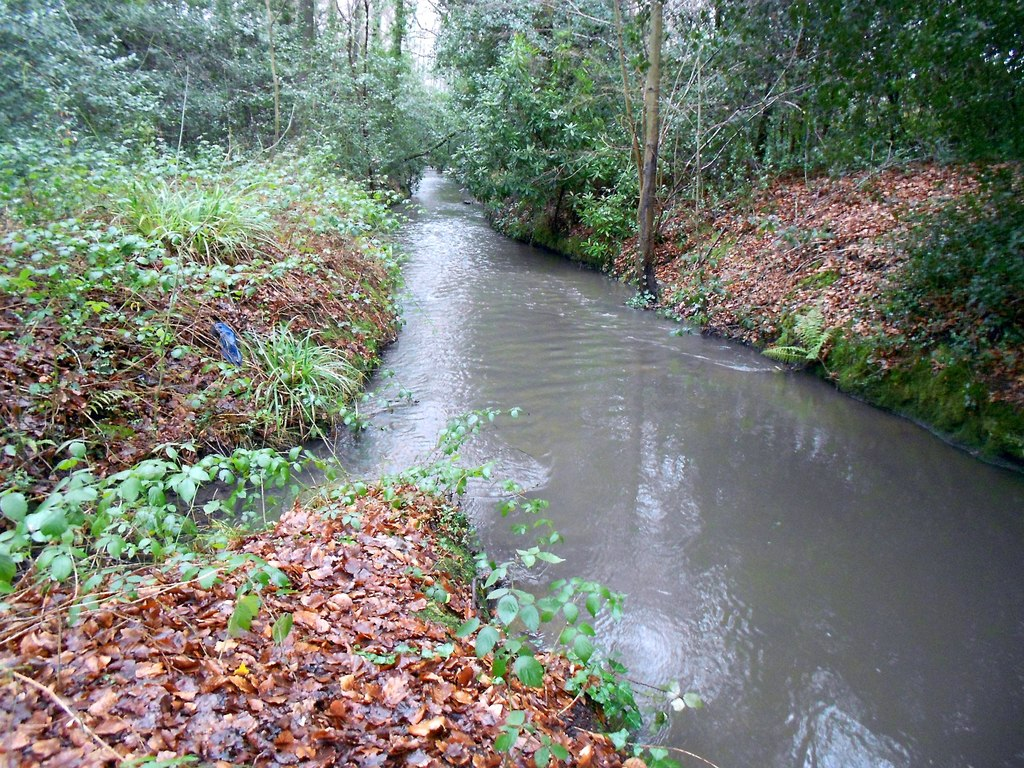
- A long straight section of Fleet Brook below Fleet Pond

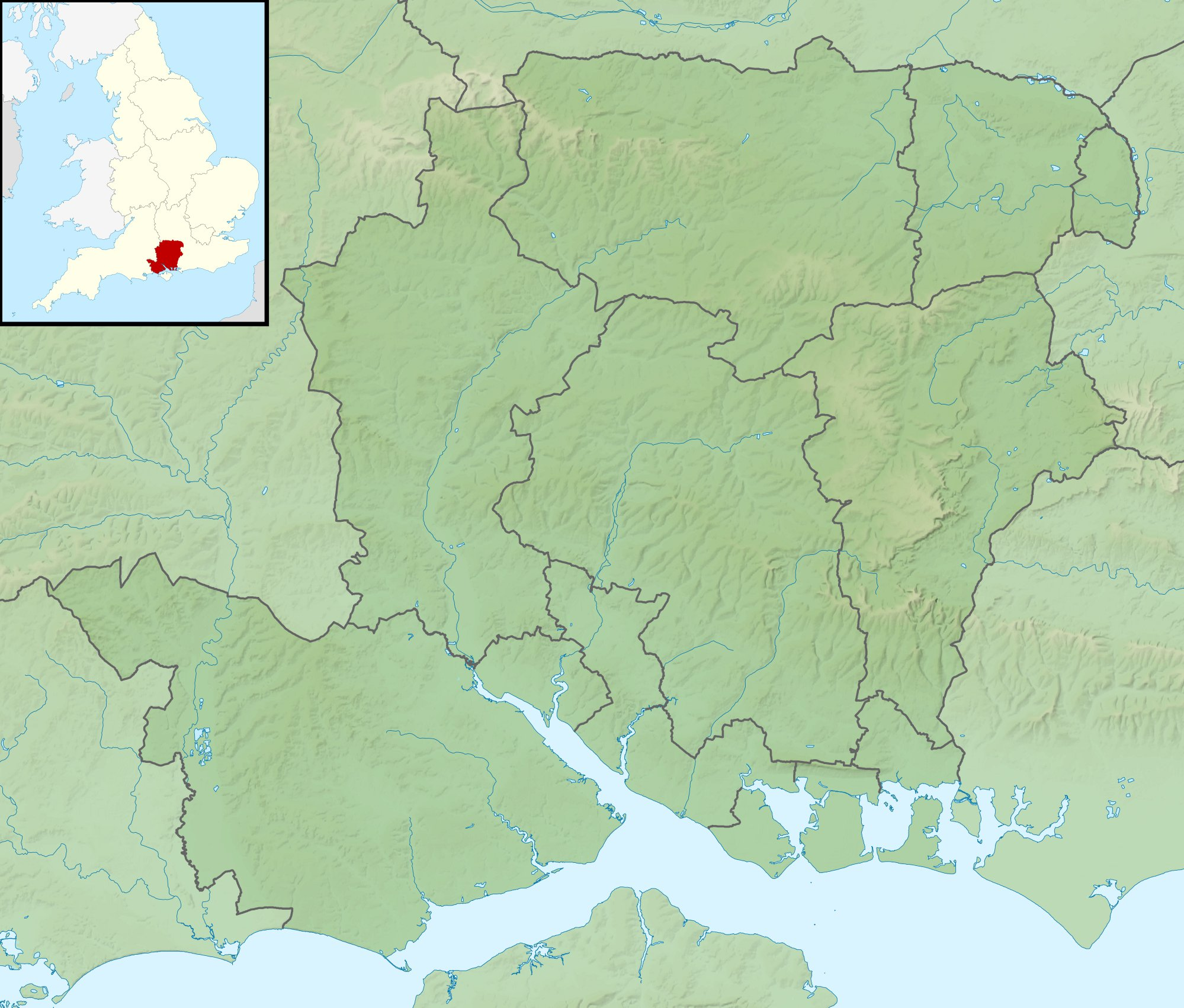
- Location within Hampshire

Location
- Country: England
- Counties: Hampshire
- Districts / Boroughs: Hart

Physical characteristics
- Source
  - location: Fleet Pond
  - coordinates: 51°17′31″N 0°49′46″W
- Mouth: River Hart
  - location: Hartley Wintney
  - coordinates: 51°18′27″N 0°52′38″W

Basin features
- Progression: Fleet Brook, Hart, Whitewater, Blackwater, Loddon, Thames
- River system: Thames Basin

Fleet Brook is a small river in northern Hampshire, England and tributary of the River Hart.

== Route ==
The source is somewhere near the town of Fleet, and the river that flows out from Fleet Pond is marked as Fleet Brook by the Ordnance Survey. The permanent streams that flow into Fleet Pond are known as the Gelvert and Brookly Streams. They are all treated as part of Fleet Brook by the Environment Agency, for the purposes of monitoring water quality.

Reservoirs near Parkhurst Hill are №s 1-5 to exclude non-existent 4, south-east of Fleet. Their water treatment is north of №2. The Environment Agency measure water quality from downstream of the intake. The Gelvert stream wends north, passing under Bourley Road, and is joined by another, which rises from a spring to the west. The stream gets its name from Gelvert Bottom, marshy terrain as it passes under Aldershot Road. Another stream and surface water drains join before it is crossed by the A323 Norris Hill Road and passes under the Basingstoke Canal where it receives overflow water from a pair of weirs. Others join before it dissipates into reed beds on the south-eastern edge of Fleet Pond.

The Brookly stream begins on Greendane Copse, a little to the north-west of the reservoirs. It is culverted under a sports ground, and then reappears until it reaches Aldershot Road, beyond which it crosses housing estates in Church Crookham and Fleet, largely in culvert, but with short open sections. In Oakley Park, it is exposed again, and has an inflowing stream, an overflow on the Basingstoke Canal, and passes under the A323 road and Albany Road to reach the south end of the park. Three more bridges carry the B3010 Kings Road, Southby Drive, and Avondale Road over the watercourse. At this point it is joined by a further stream described below. It then flows into the south-west corner of Fleet Pond.

A third stream begins in the Forest of Eversley near a five-sided enclosure, the ex-Church Crookham Military sewage works, licensed to discharge at most 1.56 Ml per day in the early 1990s. The stream passes by Fleet Infants School, designed by Michael Hopkins and Partners replacing the Victorian school, under the canal and through housing estates, remaining on the surface until it reaches Brookly Gardens, beneath which it is now culverted to join the second stream. An old OS shows that this stream originally entered Fleet Pond directly and shows a Brookly Bridge over it. The school is statutorily recognised and protected as grade II listed. The teachers and the architect saw that the boggy heath, south not be drained for playing fields, but kept as a biodiverse habitat enhancing learning.

Fleet Pond is part of a nature reserve, and covers around half of the 141-acre (57 ha) of the designated Site of Special Scientific Interest.

A weir maintains the level of it. The river exits over it, passes under the A3013 Cove Road, and runs parallel to Minley Road. It then crosses under the road and heads north-west through Broomhurst Wood, under the M3 motorway and is joined by Minley Brook on its right bank. Formerly, this section was less important, and the main river continued northwards from before the Minley Road Bridge. Fleet millpond and Mill were located just to the north of the bridge, but an office block has been built on the site. Beyond Ancells Road, the original course is still in water, passing under Barley Way and the M3 motorway and then weaving between buildings at Brook House, to join Minley Brook. It is now marked as a drain on maps. Minley Brook rises a little further to the east as a series of drains and springs in marshy ground. Brook House is not a listed structure, but predates the town of Fleet by at least 50 years, and possibly considerably more. It appeared as Brook Farm on maps from 1806, when it was already well-established. The remains of a brick-lined moat are located close to the house, and this is a locally listed asset because of its archaeological interest. The stable block and clock tower contain a clock manufactured by John Moore & Sons of Clerkenwell in 1830, and repaired by Smith & Sons, also of Clerkenwell, in 1921.

Beyond the junction with Minley Brook, the main river continues westwards, taking treated sewage from the Fleet works on its left bank. In 1991 it was licensed to discharge at most 23.7 Ml per day into the river. A little further downstream from the works, the river passes under Pale Lane Bridge. After meandering across partially wooded countryside, it is crossed by Home Farm Lane, and briefly enters Elvetham Park, the grounds of Elvetham Hall, where it joins the Hart on the park's north limit near Hartley Wintney.

== Milling ==
There is clear evidence for at least one water mill on the Fleet Brook. Isaac Taylor's map of Hampshire, produced in 1759, names Fleet Mill, Fleet Pond and Fleet Farm, and it was marked as a corn mill in 1872. It continued in use until around 1940, and in 1990, English Heritage inspected it to see whether it should become a listed building, but decided that it did not have sufficient merit. The site is now occupied by office buildings, although a small part of the mill has been incorporated into the design.

== Water quality ==
The Environment Agency measure water quality of the river systems in England. Each is given an overall ecological status, which may be one of five levels: high, good, moderate, poor and bad. Components used to determine this include biological status, which looks at the quantity and varieties of invertebrates, angiosperms and fish, and chemical status, which compares the concentrations of various chemicals against known safe concentrations. Chemical status is rated good or fail.

The water quality of the Fleet Brook was, in 2019:

Section	Ecological Status	Chemical Status	Overall Status	Length	Catchment	Channel
Fleet Brook	Moderate	Fail	Moderate	10.0 miles (16.1 km)	12.77 square miles (33.1 km^{2})	heavily modified

Reasons for the quality being such include: discharge from sewage treatment works; runoff from agricultural land; physical barriers such as weirs and impounding of the water which prevent the free migration of fish and other species; runoff from roads; and leaching from landfill sites.

== Bibliography ==
- Killilea, Ailish; O'Fegan, Stephen (June 2017). "Brook House, Fleet, Hampshire" (PDF). Iceni Projects. Archived (PDF) from the original on 11 July 2020.
- NRA (1991). "Fact File - River Blackwater" (PDF). National Rivers Authority. Archived (PDF) from the original on 12 July 2020.
- Society (2016). "History". Fleet Pond Society. Archived from the original on 7 July 2016.
- Vaidya, Ashok, ed. (2013). The Mills and Millers of Hampshire. Vol. 3 - North and East. Hampshire Mills Group.

== External sources ==
Media related to Fleet Brook at Wikimedia Commons
