= Fleet Pond =

Protected area in Fleet, Hampshire, England

Coordinates: 51.28824°N 0.82550°W

- Site of Special Scientific Interest
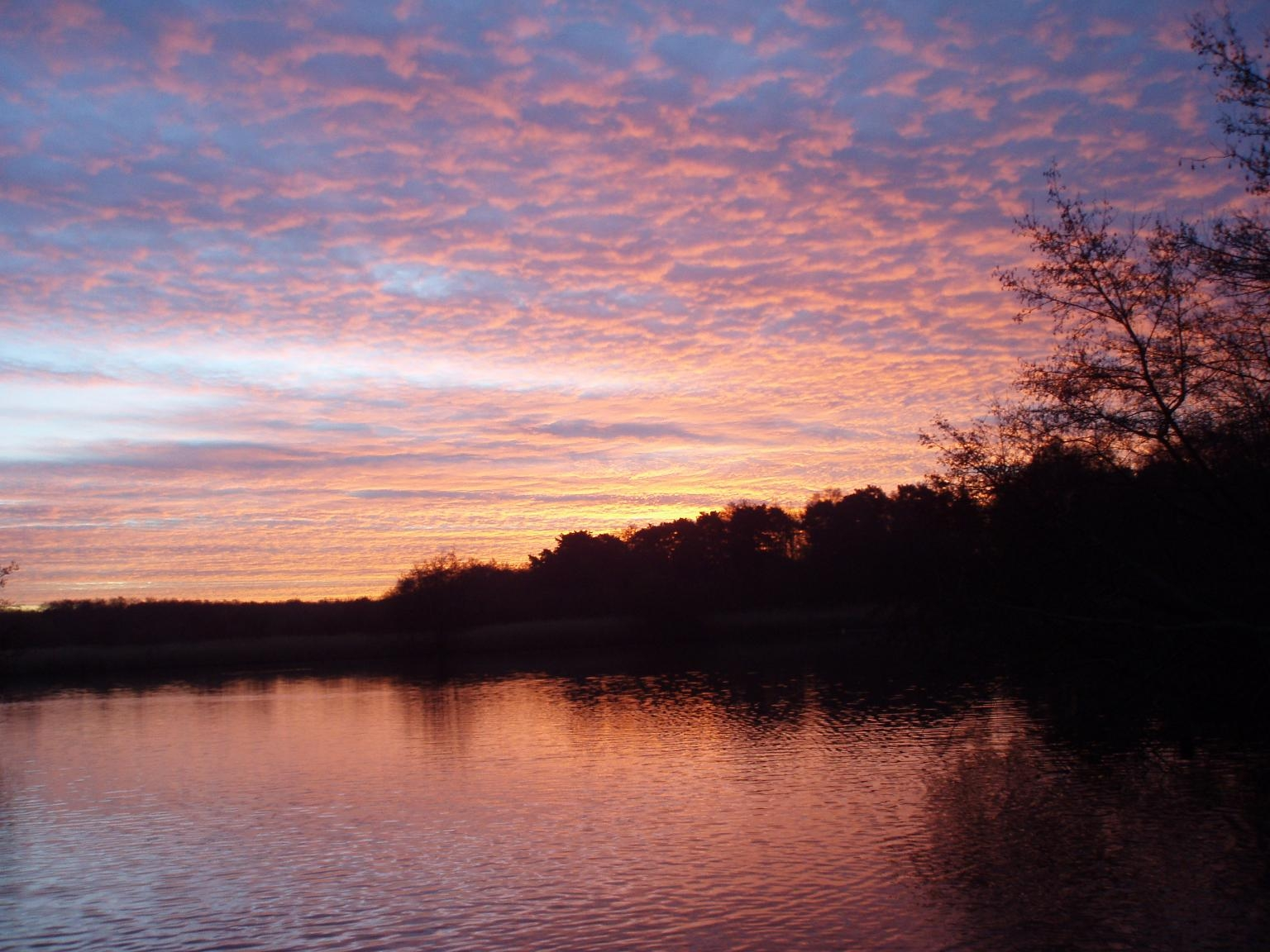
- Location of Fleet Pond.
- Area of search: Hampshire
- Grid reference: SU 821 550
- Interest: Biological
- Area: 48.3 hectares (119 acres)
- Notification date: 1984
- Location map: Magic Map

Fleet Pond is a 48.3-hectare (119-acre) biological Site of Special Scientific Interest in Fleet in Hampshire. It is also a Local Nature Reserve.

== Geography and Biodiversity ==
This large and shallow lake, fed by Fleet Brook, is surrounded by reed beds, alder carr and oak and birch woodland. The lake has a rich aquatic flora and fauna, including large populations of reed warblers and other wetland birds.

The pond has varied habitats surrounding it, including heathland, marsh, reedbed and woodland.

== History ==
The pond is first documented in 1324, when there were two ponds which were used as a fishery. In medieval times, "pond" always referred to a man-made structure, whereas "lake" referred to a natural feature, and so it is likely that the ponds were created by raising banks at the northern edge. From 1491, the Prior of Winchester leased the ponds to the occupier of Fleet Farm, in exchange for one hundred fresh fish a year, delivered to Winchester. When the lease was renewed in 1833, it was noted that there was now only one pond. The second pond was probably near Ancells Farm. Shortly afterwards, the London and Southampton Railway bought the pond for £50 as it stood in the way of their line, and built an embankment across the northern end. They appreciated its potential as a tourist destination, and opened Fleet Pond Halt so that day trippers could visit it. Much of the surrounding area became a military training ground in 1854, and as part of that training, soldiers built a 470-yard (430 m) trestle bridge across it in 1885. During the Second World War, the pond was drained, to make the area less visible to enemy aircraft, but it was refilled in 1947, and planted with reeds. The pond became one of the first SSSIs in Hampshire in 1951, and under the Wildlife and Countryside Act 1981, duly re-registered, but to omit the portion north of the embankment. Hart District Council bought the pond and surrounding heath in 1972, after the army dubbed it redundant, and since 1976 has worked with the Fleet Pond Society to create a Local nature reserve. They have installed two bridges to create a circular walk around the pond.
