= Calthorpe Park School =

School Park Calthorpe

Location
- Hitches Lane; Fleet, Hampshire, GU51 5JA; England
- Coordinates: 51.2789°N 0.86231°W

Information
- Type: Community School
- Motto: Students who aspire for themselves and inspire others
- Established: 3 September 1969
- Founder: Charlie Manley III
- Local authority: Hampshire
- Department for Education URN: 116436 Tables
- Ofsted: Reports
- Headteacher: Kevan John
- Gender: Coeducational
- Age: 11 to 16
- Enrolment: 1450
- Houses: Ruby, Topaz, Quartz, Emerald, Sapphire and Amethyst
- Colour: Maroon
- Website: https://www.cps.hants.sch.uk/

Calthorpe Park School is one of two secondary schools in Fleet, Hampshire, England. for pupils aged 11–16. The school was awarded specialist status as a Maths and Computing College in 2005. In the 2013 OFSTED report the school received an overall effectiveness of 'good'.

A major capital scheme by Hampshire County Council to extend the school to accommodate more pupils was completed in 2004. It then underwent another scheme in 2008–9 to extend the school further. The school underwent another expansion project in 2014–2015.

== History ==
Calthorpe Park School opened on Wednesday 3 September 1969 as North Fleet Bilateral School with J. Ormerod as Headteacher. A few months later, the new Governing Body changed the name. 153 pupils and 11 staff were the first occupants before all year groups were complete five years later.

The official opening took place on Friday 18 June 1971 by W. van Straubenzee,, MP from the Department of Education and Science. After the National Anthem and a Dedication from the Vicar of Fleet, Rev A.C.B. Deedes, speeches were given by a variety of people connected to the school including the Chairman of the School Governors, Major B.C. Debenham,, the Chairman of Hampshire County Council, Brig Sir Richard A-G Calthorpe.

The school formed part of the 1967/68 Major Building Programme, designed by the County Architect in the SCOLA Mark IA form of construction using standard components with some brick cladding. The total building cost of the project, including fees, furniture and equipment was approximately £410,000.

The original buildings were extended over the years with Phase 2 (English, Tech, Library) being built in 1974, followed by the Maths block, the old and new Drama blocks and the Leisure Centre next door to the school.

The Hart Leisure centre was previously located on site, before having its extended car park being demolished in Early 2018 which has since been replaced with a sports hall. The total cost of the project was approximately £3.4 Million. Followed by the demolition of the main leisure centre itself in late 2019 to make way for an expansion of the school onto that site.

C. Heasman took over as Headteacher in 1988 before retiring in 2005 when C. Anwar became Headteacher. M. Amos and M. Hooper were appointed Joint Headteachers in 2014. Mr Kevan John became the Headteacher in 2021.

In 2020, Morgan Sindall was awarded a contract for the expansion of the school. As part of the works, Morgan Sindall Construction will also carry out re-modelling to the existing school to provide two new science labs and additional library space in the heart of the existing school. The project was completed in September 2021.

== Notable alumni ==
- Carla Denyer, Green Party member of parliament
