= River Hart =

Tributary of the River Whitewater in north Hampshire, England

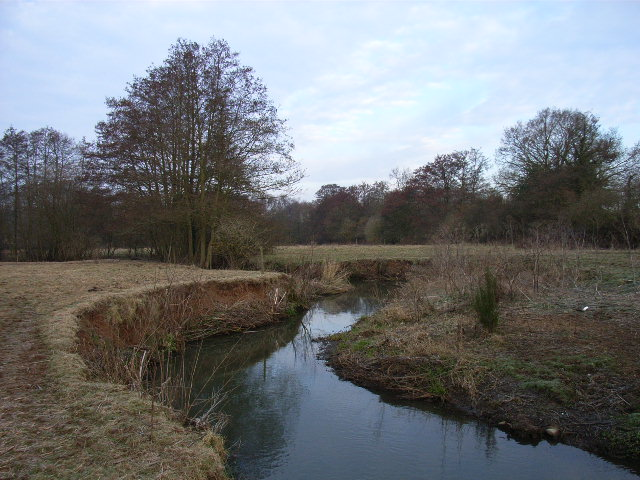
- Just upstream of treated wastewater outfall of Hartley Wintney sewage treatment works

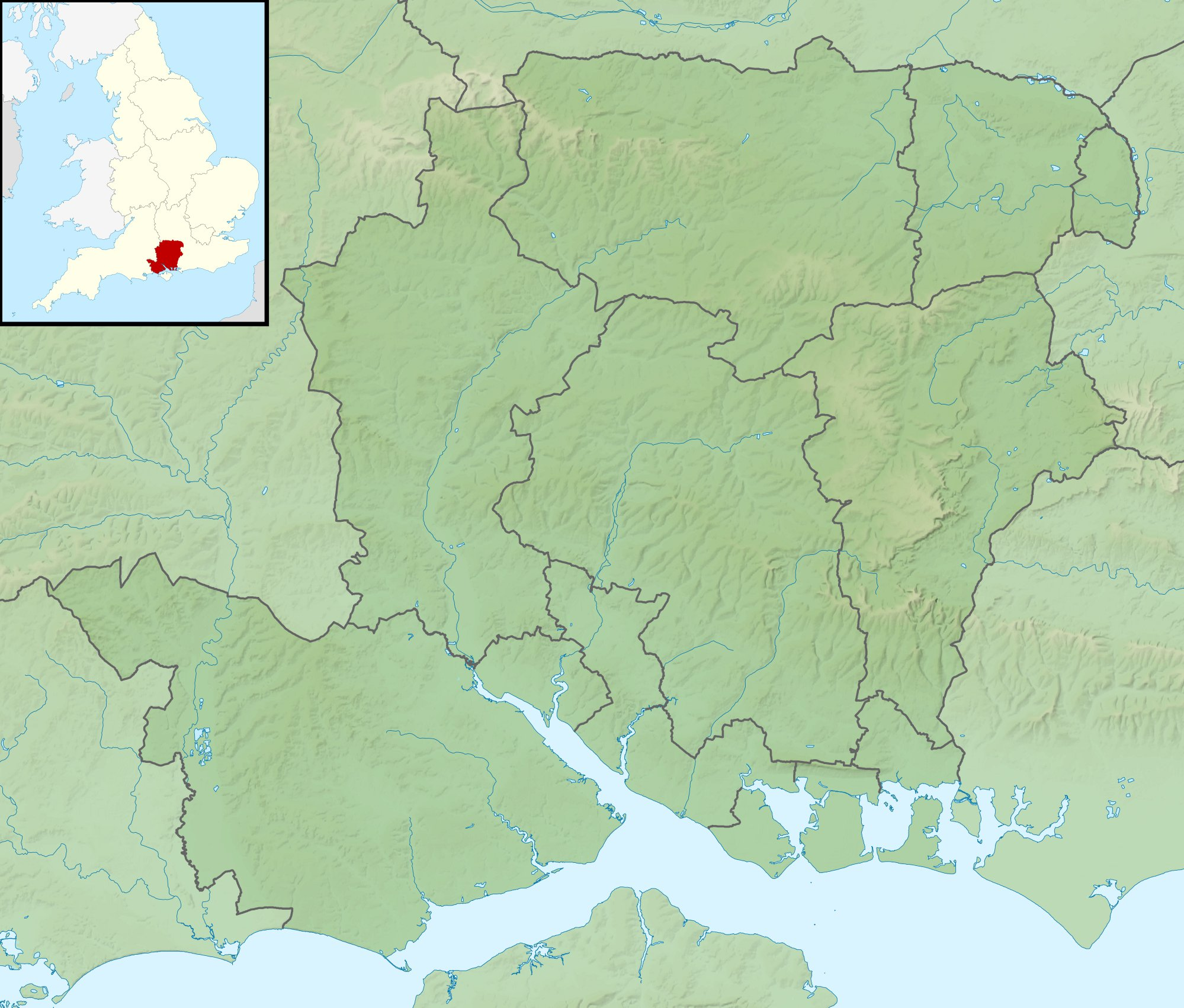
- Mouth of the Hart (into the Whitewater)
- Etymology: A hart – a deer

Location
- Country: England
- Counties: Hampshire
- Districts / Boroughs: Hart

Physical characteristics
- Source
  - location: Crondall, Hampshire, United Kingdom
  - coordinates: 51°14′07″N 0°51′33″W
  - elevation: 85 metres (279 ft)
- Mouth: River Whitewater
  - location: Hart, Hampshire
  - coordinates: 51°20′32″N 0°56′13″W
  - elevation: 46 metres (151 ft)

Basin features
- Progression: Hart, Whitewater, Blackwater, Loddon, Thames
- Tributaries
  - right: Fleet Brook

The River Hart is a tributary of the River Whitewater in north Hampshire, England. It rises at Ashley Head spring in Crondall and flows north to meet the Whitewater at Bramshill.

The Hart district of Hampshire is named after the river.

== Route ==
The Hart rises at a series of springs at about 85 metres (279 ft) elevation on Crondall golf course. From the main spring at Ashley Head, it flows northwards, hemmed in by housing, and is crossed by Redlands Lane, before passing under the drive of East Bridge House, an early 19th-century mansion with older core recognised and protected in the mainstream, starting category It passes Marsh Farm Business Centre (to right then fields, then passes under the Basingstoke Canal near Crookham Wharf. After running along the backs of housing on Crondall Road, it passes under the road, to be joined by a stream on its left bank.

The tributary begins at some springs and ponds known as Itchel Mill Springs. The outlet flows under the A287 road to reach the site of the mill demolished in 1945; a modern house has replaced the mill cottage. Beyond this, it threads its way through Coxmoor Farm, under the Basingstoke Canal and across Peatmoor Copse, where it is joined by another small stream, to reach the main channel of the Hart.

After, is Pilcot Mill at Dogmersfield, a two-storey millhouse from the 18th century, last used for milling in 1928. Its mill cottage has 17th and 18th century elements. On the downstream side of Pilcot Bridge is a large timber-framed house of even date known as Catherine of Aragon (House).

Pilcot farm is on the left bank, and then the river passes often tree-lined through fields west of Fleet, where ditches add to it. The channel splits into two to pass under the South West Main Line embankment, fields being drained up to about the M3 motorway. A key ditch begins across the latter, and runs beside the main channel on its left bank. Both are crossed by the A323 Fleet Road, and are controlled by sluices as they enter Elvetham Park.

The park was created in the 14th century. It was re-landscaped in 1591 for Edward Seymour, 1st Earl of Hertford to entertain Elizabeth I with four days of lavish festivities. Courtiers were offered a booklet describing the entertainment. In the 18th and early 19th centuries the park was extended and planting took place in some areas, while ornamental and formal gardens were added in the later 19th and early 20th centuries. The original Elvetham House burnt down in 1840, and was replaced by the grade II* listed Elvetham Hall built between 1859 and 1862 by Samuel Sanders Teulon. Additions were made to the building in 1901 and 1911–12, while the grounds include a Norman-style church building erected in 1840 by Henry Roberts. The river runs through the park, separating Elvetham Park to the south-east from New Park, to the north-west. A lake was constructed in 1871, to the north-east of the hall, but this had become overgrown with vegetation by the 1980s, and a weir and bypass channel were built, so that the river could be diverted around it to allow it to be dredged. Teulon also built a bridge over the river, with two segmental brick arches and wrought iron gates.

As the river leaves, it is joined by the Fleet Brook on its right bank. Hartford Bridge carries the A30 road over the river at the small village of Hartfordbridge. Shortly afterwards, Hartley Wintney sewage works outfall is received. The Hart continues through wooded countryside, and enters the grade I listed Bramshill Park. Its original 2,500 acres (1,000 ha) of land was enclosed by Thomas Foxley in 1347 as a deer park, and he later built the house. Diplomat, Edward, Lord Zouche of Harringworth, bought it in 1605, and built a mansion between 1605 and 1612, incorporating part of the house. The park was landscaped in the 17th century, and in the late 18th and early 19th centuries, the river widened to form the Broad Water. The estate was sold in 1952, and parts of it became a Police Training College. The site was given a grade I, top, listing, having an early 17th-century water garden. Its associated mansion is one of three Jacobean buildings known to include two state apartments, one for the king and another for the queen. Within the park is a grade I listed bridge crossing the river, built in the early 19th century in Jacobean style, with two red-brick arches and stone dressing. After leaving the park, the river is crossed by Plough Lane at Lea Bridge, and then joins the River Whitewater, on its right bank.

== Milling ==
There is clear evidence for two water mills on the Hart, both of which were corn mills in 1871. Only Pilcot Mill at Dogmersfield survives. It is a small building with three storeys, constructed with a timber frame and brick infill. A mill in Dogmersfield was mentioned in the Domesday Book, compiled in 1086, but it was probably a little further downstream at a building known as Pilcot and more recently, Catherine of Aragon. There are records for a mill at there from the 15th, 16th and 17th centuries. The surviving mill dates from the 18th century, and the last record of it being used dates from 1928. In the 1980s, Anne and Geoff Finnigan owned the mill, and by the late 1980s, a considerable amount of restoration had been carried out. The mill was powered by an external Poncelet wheel, a more efficient form of undershot water wheel, but its condition in 2013 was poor. Internally, all of the machinery and two pairs of stones are still in situ. There is evidence that water power was supplemented by an engine, the base for which can still be seen. Because the river was prone to flooding, there are two bypass channels running parallel to the wheel pit.

There have also been mills at Crondall, below Itchel Mill Springs. There was a mill there in 1068, when it was valued at three shillings (15p), but by 1327 it was described as "an utter ruin and of no value". Two water mills were mentioned in 1653, and three grist mills under a single roof in 1773. The final mill building was erected some time before 1850, and was demolished in 1945. The adjacent mill house has been replaced by a modern residence. The mill was always seasonal, as the mill pond was fed by a spring, which was dry for part of the year. Generally, the pond filled in February each year, and milling could take place for several months afterwards.

== Water quality ==
Environment Agency staff measure rivers' water quality. Each is given an overall ecological status, one of five levels: high, good, moderate, poor and bad. Components of determination include biological status (the quantity and varieties of invertebrates, angiosperms and fish). Chemical status, which compares the concentrations of various chemicals against known safe concentrations, is rated good or fail.

The water quality of the Hart system was as follows in 2019.

Section	Ecological Status	Chemical Status	Overall Status	Length	Catchment
Hart (Crondall to Elvetham)	Poor	Fail	Poor	6.8 miles (10.9 km)	17.35 square miles (44.9 km^{2})
Hart (Elvetham to Hartley Wintney)	Poor	Fail	Poor	4.8 miles (7.7 km)	4.60 square miles (11.9 km^{2})

Reasons for the quality being less than good include: discharge from sewage treatment works; runoff from agricultural land; physical barriers such as weirs and impounding of the water which prevent the free migration of fish and other species; runoff from roads; and leaching from landfill sites.

== Bibliography ==
- British Library (1591). "An Entertainment for Elizabeth I at Elvetham, 1591". Unknown (held by Royal Collection). Archived from the original on 20 June 2016.
- Vaidya, Ashok, ed. (2013). The Mills and Millers of Hampshire. Vol. 3 - North and East. Hampshire Mills Group.
