= All Saints Church, Fleet =

All Saints' Church, Fleet
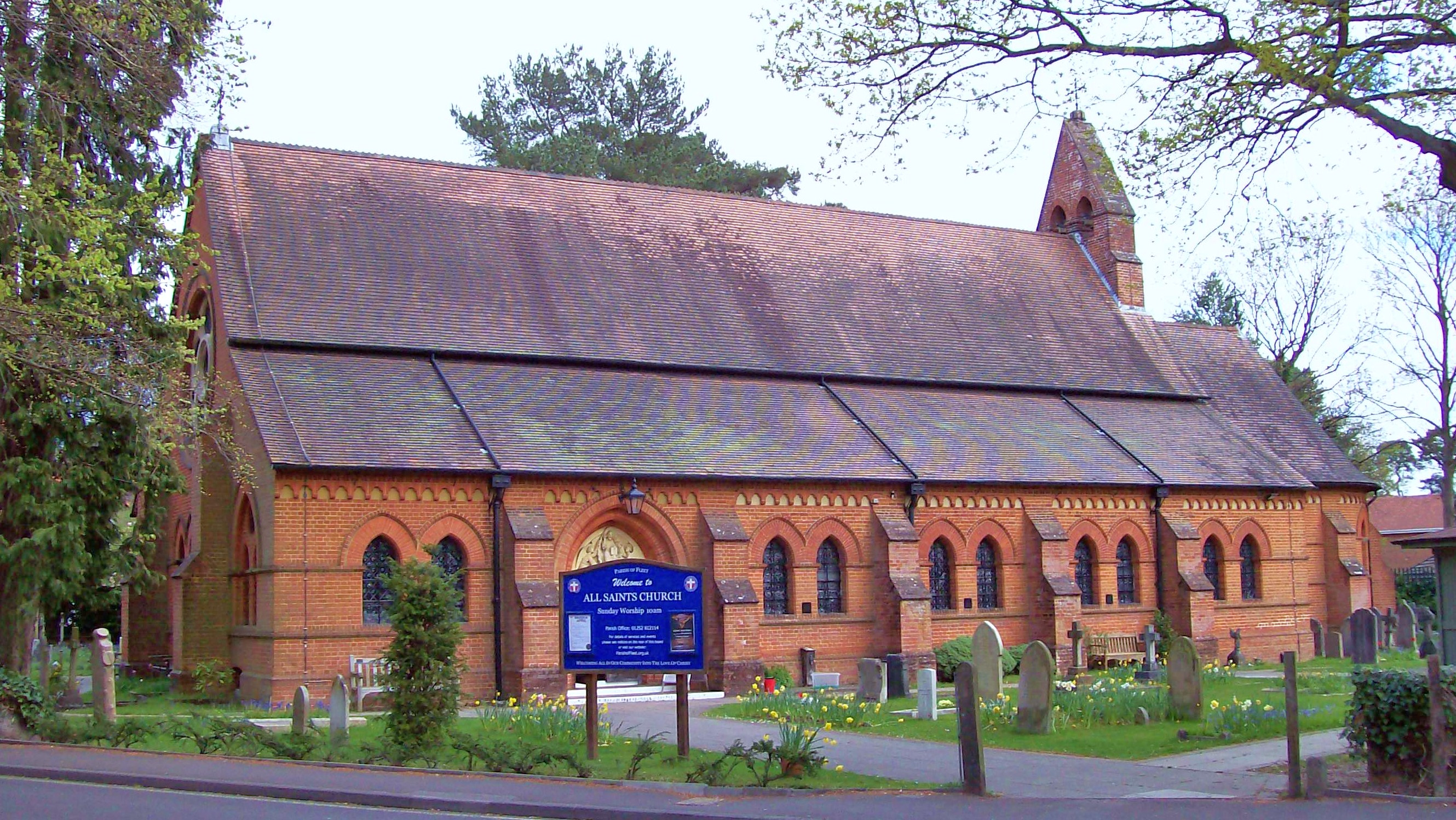
- View of All Saints in April 2014
- All Saints' Church, Fleet
- 51°17′02″N 0°50′34″W
- OS grid reference: SU 80808 54507
- Location: Fleet
- Country: England
- Denomination: Church of England
- Churchmanship: Broad Church
- Website: parishoffleet.org.uk

History
- Dedication: All Saints
- Consecrated: 29 April 1862

Architecture
- Heritage designation: Grade II* listed
- Architect: William Burges
- Construction cost: £3,323

Administration
- Province: Canterbury
- Diocese: Guildford
- Archdeaconry: Surrey
- Deanery: Aldershot
- Parish: Fleet

All Saints' Church is the Anglican parish church of the town of Fleet in the county of Hampshire, England. It is notable for its architect, William Burges and was constructed between 1861 and 1862. A Grade II* listed building, the church was very badly damaged in an arson attack in 2015. An eight-year restoration saw the church reopen in April 2023.

== History and description ==
The church was designed by Burges and was built between 1861 and 1862. It was extended to the west in 1934 by A. J. Steadman and a Lady Chapel was added in 1958 by John Purser. The church was commissioned by the local squire, Charles Edward Lefroy, secretary to the Speaker of the House of Commons as a memorial to his wife, Janet Lefroy. It cost £3,323. It has been listed Grade II* on the National Heritage List for England since June 1987.

Pevsner says of Fleet that "it has no shape, nor character nor notable buildings, except one", that one being All Saints. The church is of red brick and its plan is "simple in the extreme." The interior too is simply decorated but the massive sculpture, particularly of the Lefroys' tomb and of the gabled arch below which it originally sat is quintessentially Burges, "not so much muscular (gothic) as muscle-bound". Janet Lefroy was originally a Walker, daughter of James Walker, who established the great marine engineering company of Walker and Burges with Alfred Burges, father of William. This family connection led to Burges obtaining the commission.

The interior was significantly altered in the later twentieth century by the removal of the Lefroy tomb from its original position and by the whitewashing of the apse. Of these alterations, Pevsner comments; "And so a work by a none too prolific genius is irreparably spoiled."

The churchyard contains Commonwealth war graves of eight servicemen from World War I and one from World War II.

== Fire ==
Far greater damage was caused in 2015 by an arson attack. On 22 June the roof and much of the interior was destroyed by a major fire. Daniel Finnerty, a seventeen-year-old local, was subsequently arrested for suspected arson. In November 2015, at Winchester Crown Court, Finnerty pleaded guilty to two charges of arson and was sentenced to four years in a Youth Offender Institution (reduced to 3 1/2 years on appeal) and to a three-year extended licence. The church was returned to a condition where it could hold services by 30 April 2023 when it was reconsecrated.

== Gallery ==
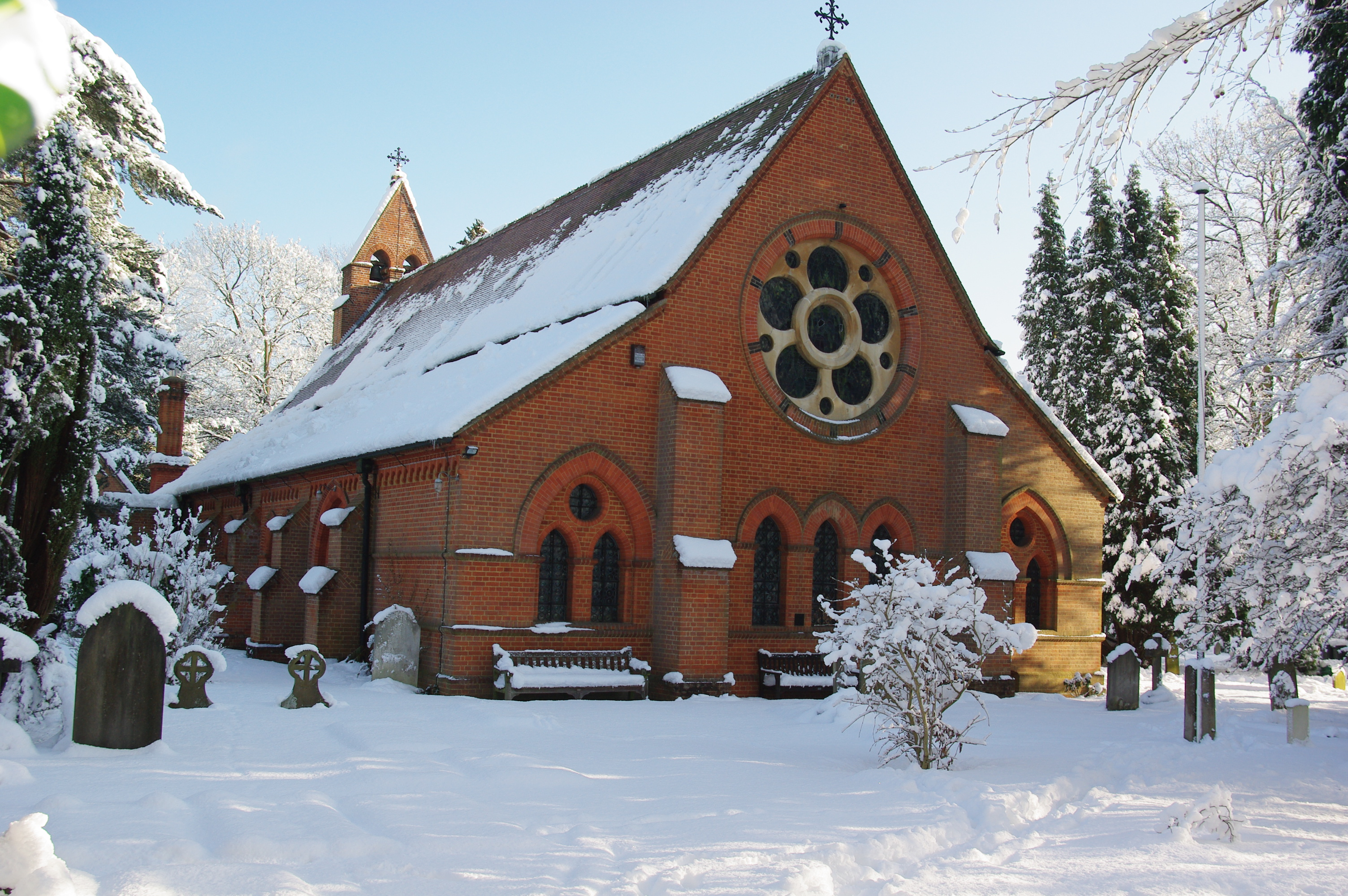
The church in snow (2010)

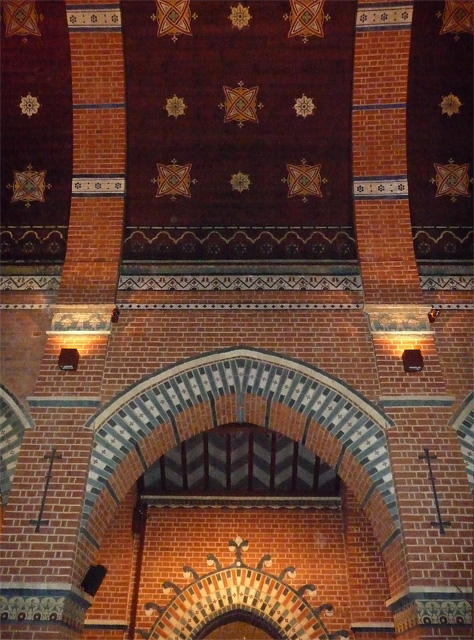
Interior detail (2012)

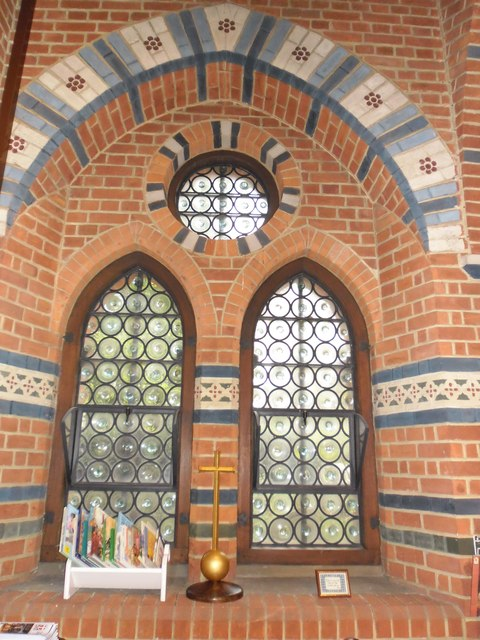
Window (2012)

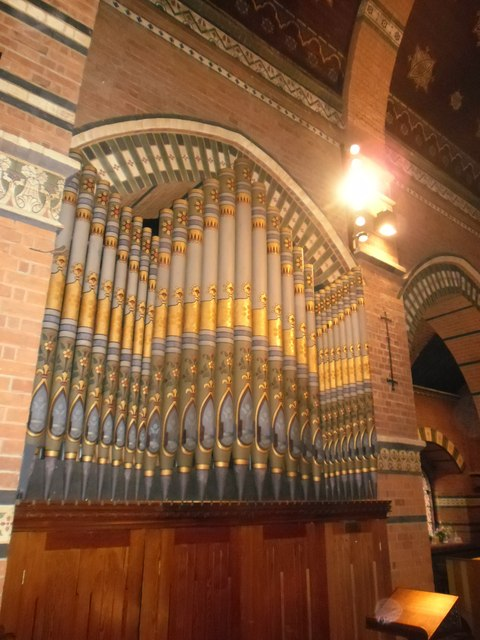
Organ (2012)

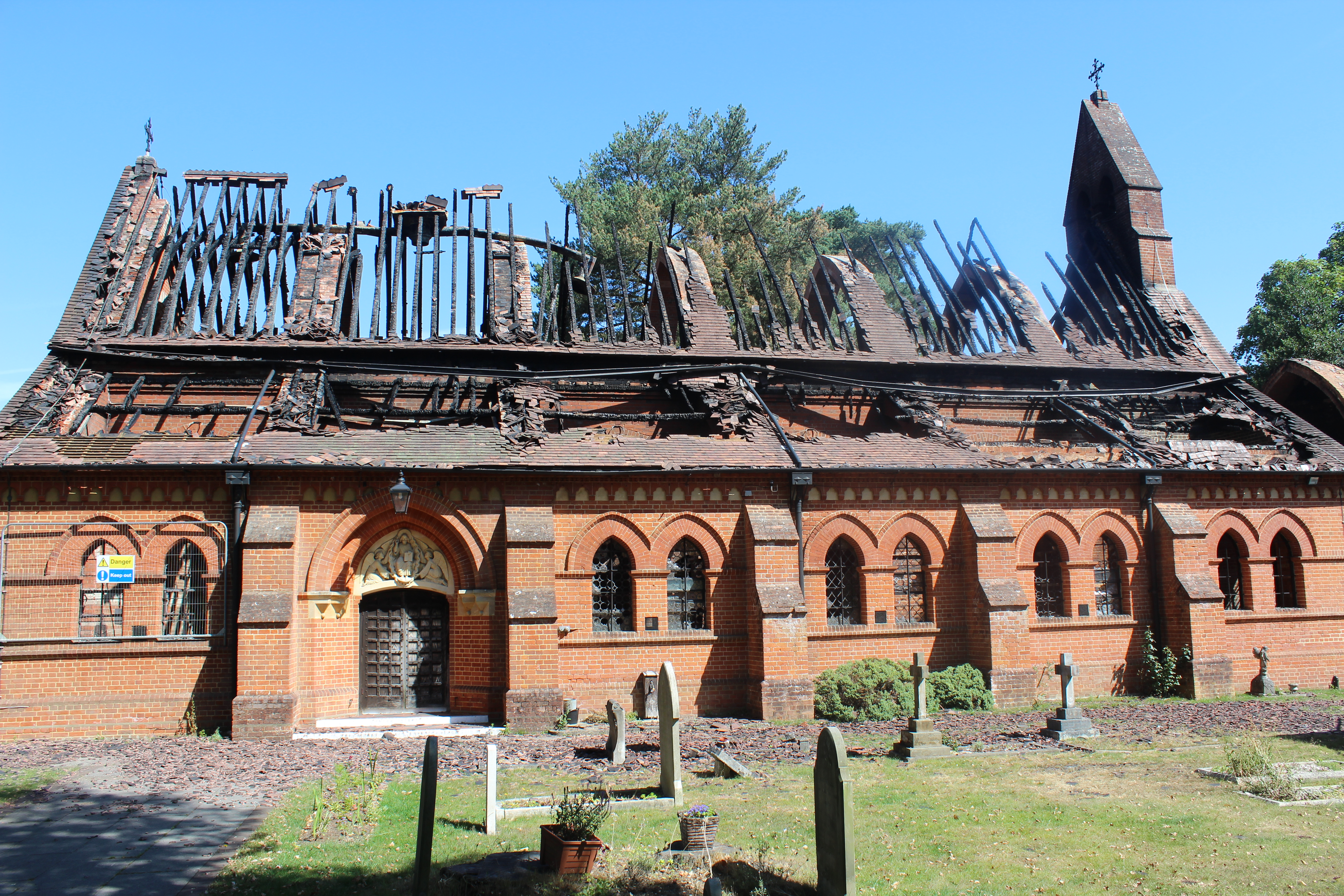
Fire damage (2015)

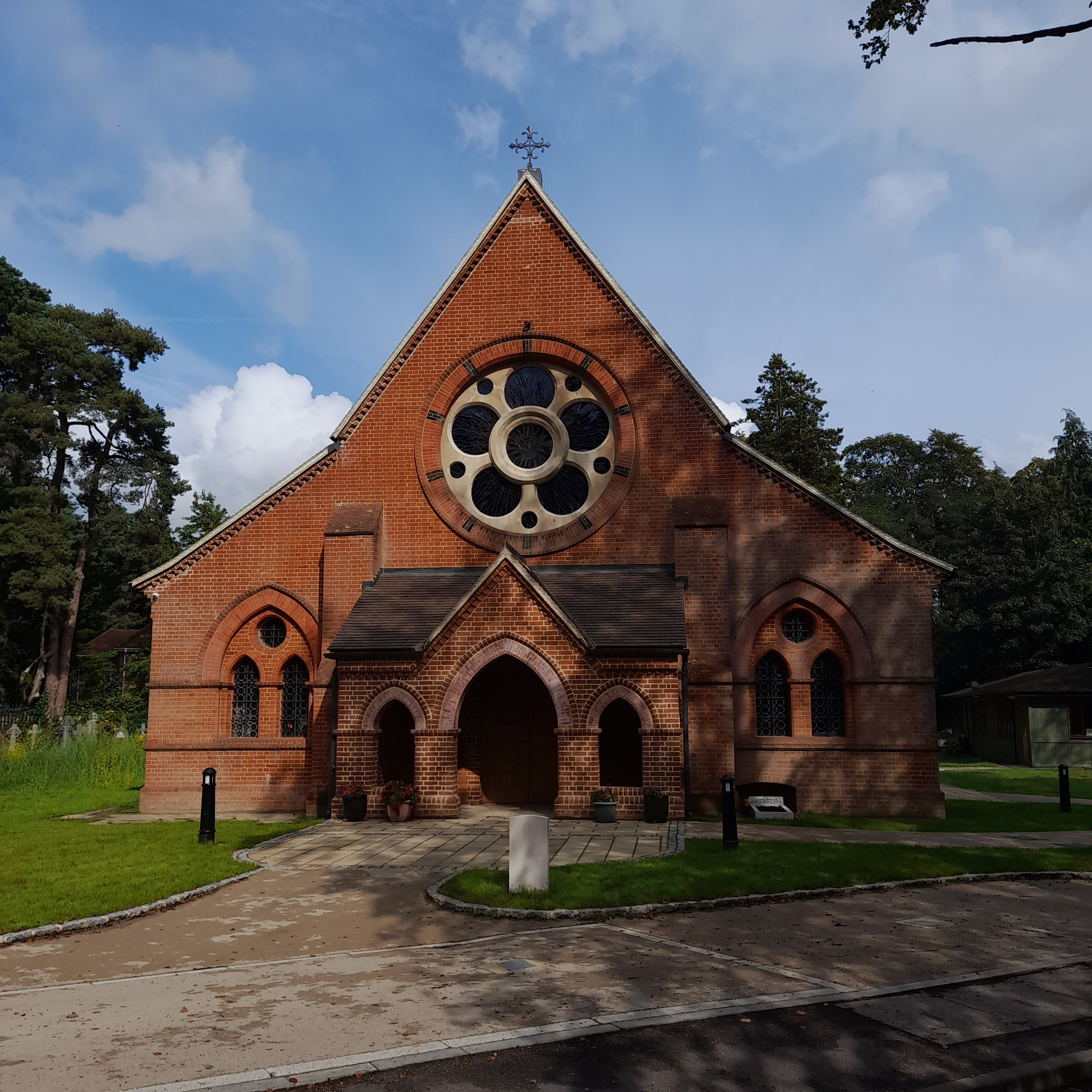
West elevation after 2023 rebuild
