= Tim Battersby =

British musician (born 1949)

Tim Battersby (born 16 March 1949) is a British composer and performer of children's music.

== Biography ==
Tim Battersby was born in Fleet, Hampshire, on 16 March 1949 and was educated at Lancing College. His father was British diplomat E.W. Battersby, OBE (1916–1997). In 1977, he composed the music for a Smithsonian Institution film entitled The Last Chance, which debuted at The National Zoo in Washington D.C. in May 1978.

As one half of The Battersby Duo, he has received three Parents' Choice Awards and an American Cable Emmy. The Battersby Duo has performed at The White House six times, as well as The Kennedy Center for the Performing Arts, The Tampa Bay Performing Arts Center, The Filene Center at Wolf Trap, The Savannah Music Festival, and Charleston's Piccolo Spoleto Festival. The Battersby Duo has also appeared on The Today Show on NBC. On 1 December 2010, The Battersby Duo was nominated for a Grammy Award for their latest children's CD, Sunny Days.

== Discography ==
- A Tail of Too Sillies (1993)
- Too Sillies Two (1999)
- By the Book (2003)
- Color Magic (2008)
- "Painting Box" (2008)
- " Sunny Days" (2010)
