= Sydney Green & Sons =

English civil engineering contractor

Sydney Green & Sons was a civil engineering contractor from Oxfordshire in England, which built sections of British motorways, notably the M2 in Kent, M5 and the M40, mostly in the Home Counties.

== History ==
It was formed by Colonel Sydney W. Green OBE on 19 February 1948.

The company floated on the London stock exchange in January 1959.

The company was bought on Monday 6 November 1967 for around £2.8m, and operated as a subsidiary.

In 1973, the company made a £904,000 loss, and the parent company withdrew from civil engineering.

== Structure ==
It held annual general meetings in Henley-on-Thames, where it was headquartered.

== Construction ==
- A14 (former A45) - it was awarded a £2m contract on Tuesday 16 March 1971 for the Trimley bypass of the A45, by East Suffolk County Council
- M2 - the contract was awarded on Monday 12 June 1961 for the 26-mile motorway, where it built part of the £1,106,408 Section 1, as part of a consortium
- M4 - Heathrow Spur to Langley, four miles, £3.2m, with Cubitts, as a consortium, opened December 1964
- M40 - as part of a consortium of two other contractors, it was offered the contract of £4,749,822 on Monday 29 June 1964 for the first eight miles of the A40(M) in Buckinghamshire, now the M40, where work started on 1 July 1964, to last 28 months, and on Tuesday 12 January 1971 it was awarded a £290,274 contract to build the Knaves Beech Interchange junction 3 on the M40 at Loudwater, Buckinghamshire, near the Loudwater Viaduct
- M5 - awarded the contract of £5.5m on Thursday 5 June 1969 for six miles of the motorway from Brookthorpe to Eastington, Stroud in Gloucestershire, to take two years in partnership with Costain Group
- Fleet services on the M3, construction began in February 1972, opening in June 1973
