= Elvetham Heath =

Village and civil parish in Hampshire, England

Coordinates: 51.295°N 0.8428°W

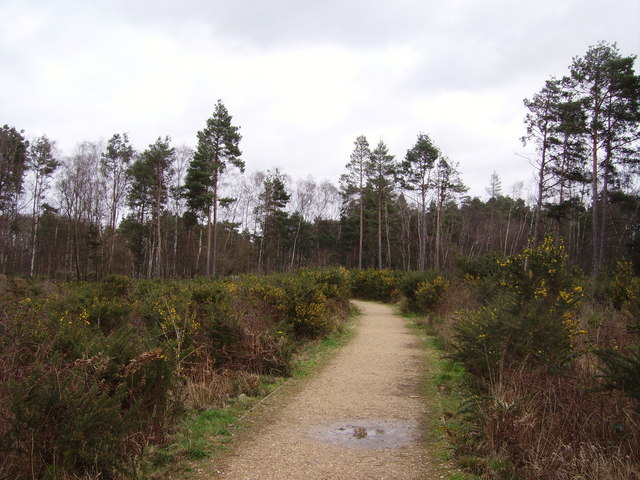
Elvetham Heath Nature Reserve which is a Local Nature Reserve and a heathland restoration project.

Elvetham Heath is a residential area and civil parish, containing 1,894 homes on a 311-acre (1.26 km^{2}) site, just outside the north western boundary of the town of Fleet in the English county of Hampshire. Construction of Elvetham Heath began in the summer of 1999 and ended in June 2008. The population of the civil parish at the 2021 Census was 5,269.

== Location ==
Elvetham Heath was built on reclaimed pine plantation/heathland between the M3 motorway and the London-Southampton railway line, 2 miles (3.2 km) north of Fleet town centre. Formerly known as Railroad Heath, it previously belonged to the local Calthorpe Estate.

Elvetham Heath serves as a commuter area to local towns; Basingstoke some 12 miles (19 km) to the west, Reading is 16 miles (26 km) to the north and London is 37 miles (60 km) to the northeast. The development is located precisely midway between Southampton and London. It is adjacent to the M3 motorway, 12 miles (19 km) from the M4, and 14 miles (23 km) from the M25. Fleet railway station is approximately 1.2 miles (1.9 km) from the centre of the development.

== Nature reserve ==
The district has a Local Nature Reserve, Elvetham Heath LNR, managed by Hart District Council.
