= Elvetham Heath LNR =

Local nature reserve in Hampshire, UK

Coordinates: 51.295°N 0.847°W

Elvetham Heath
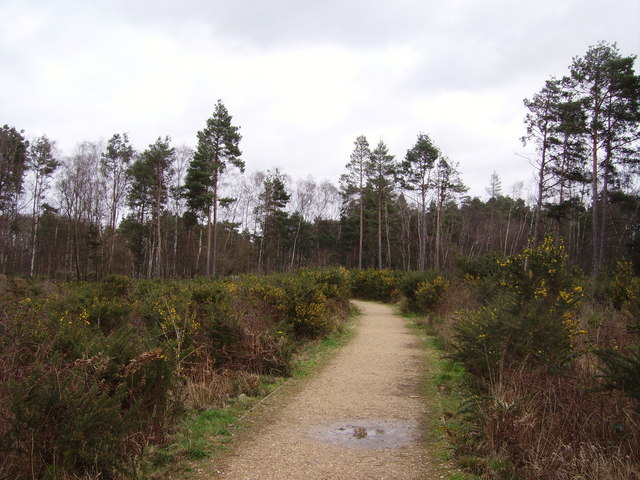
- Interactive map of Elvetham Heath
- Type: Local Nature Reserve
- Location: Elvetham Heath, Hampshire
- OS grid: SU 805 557
- Area: 20 hectares (49 acres)
- Manager: Hart Countryside Service

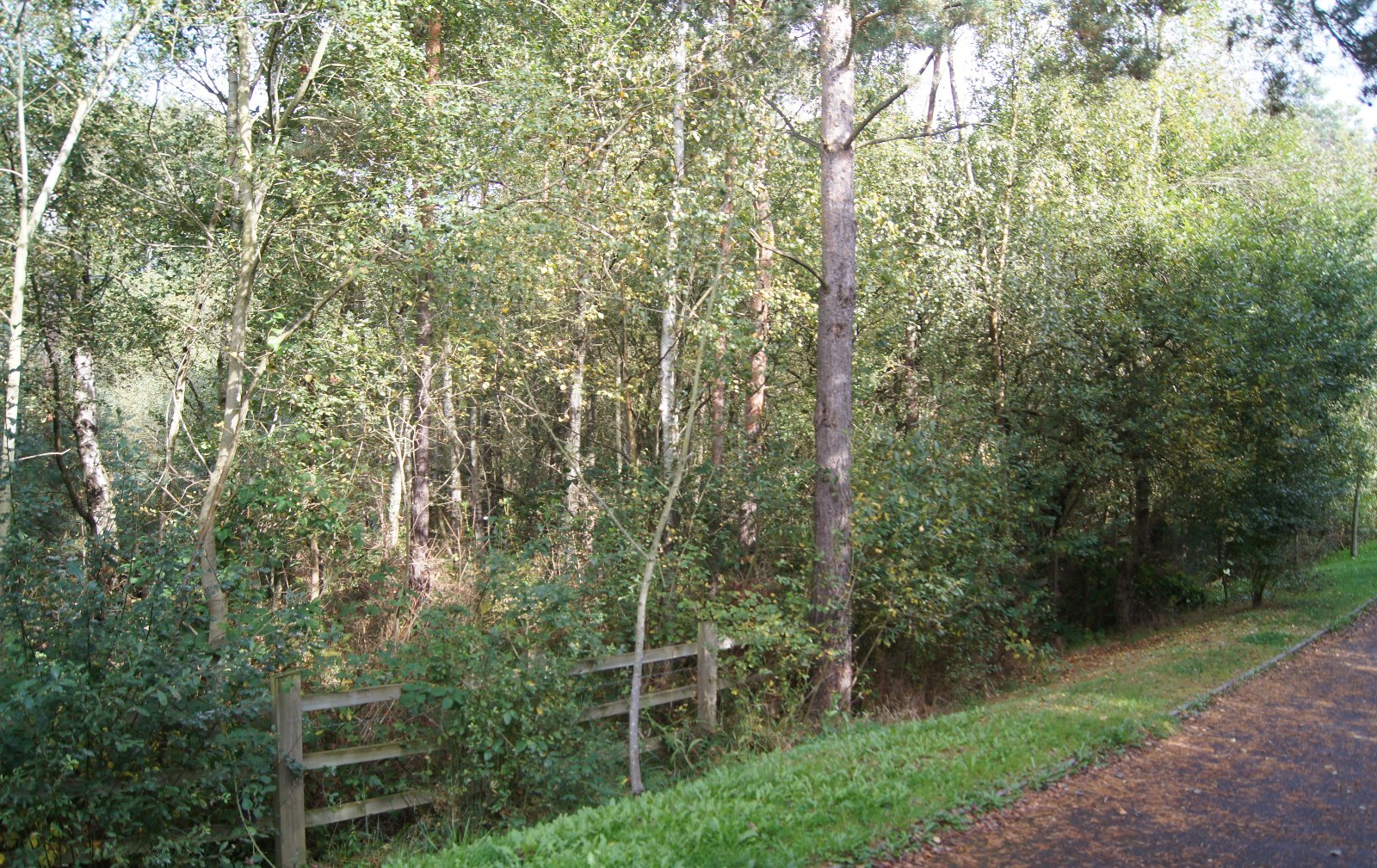
Trail in Elvetham Heath LNR

Elvetham Heath LNR is a 20-hectare (49-acre) local nature reserve in Elvetham Heath in Hampshire. It is owned by Elvetham Heath Developments (on a 999-year lease to Hart District Council) and managed by Hart Countryside Service. The nature reserve and adjoining open spaces have been given a Green Flag Award.

Typical heathland plants such as heather and gorse are regenerating naturally on the heath, and there are other habitats such as reedbeds and wet woodland, which has the rare plant bog myrtle.

== Gallery ==
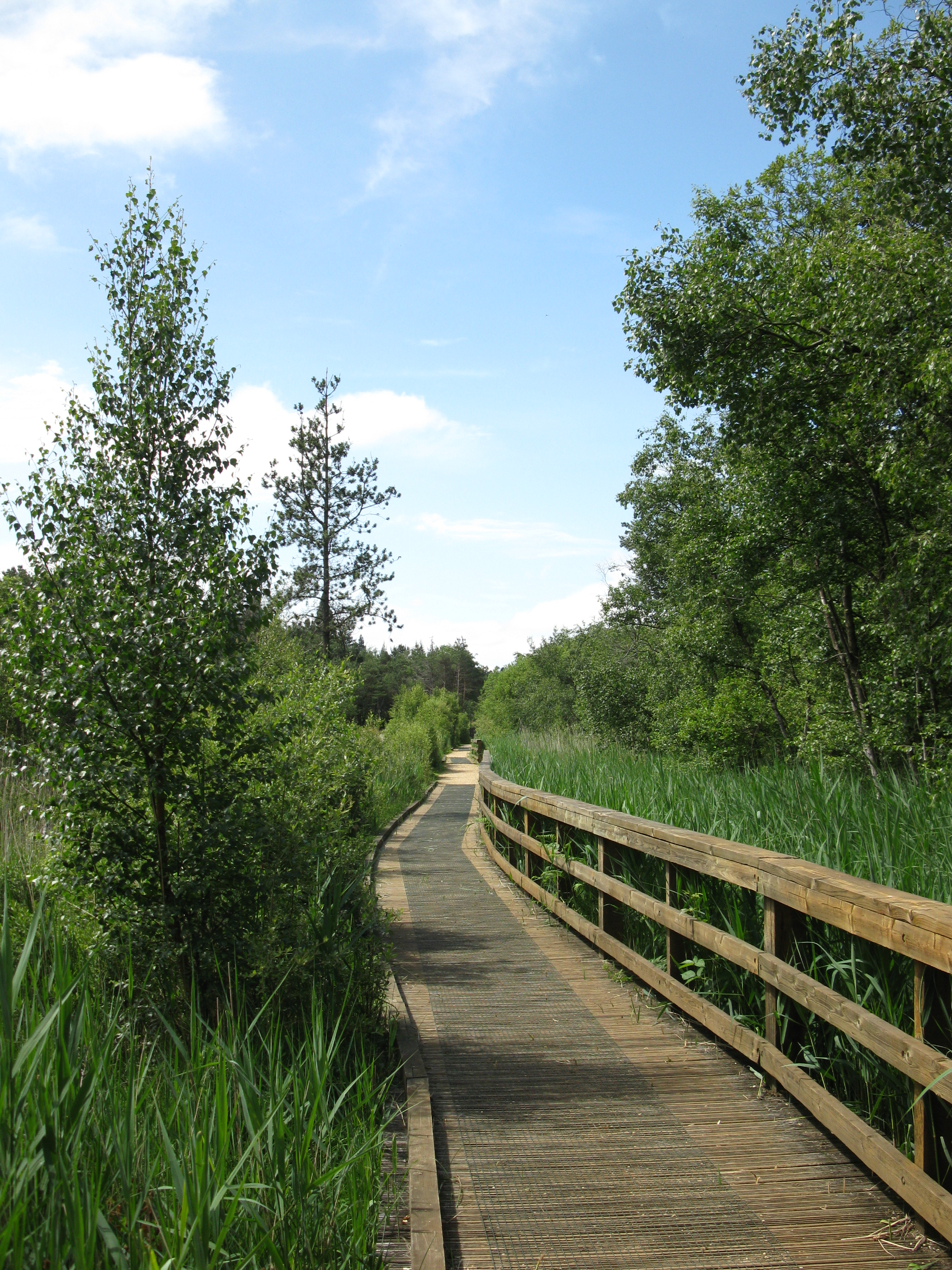
Boardwalk

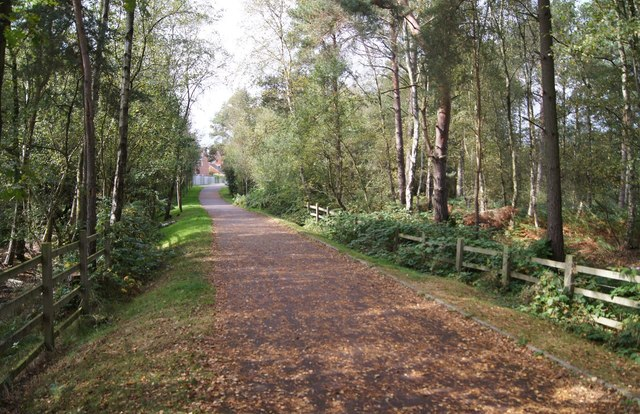
Path in Elvetham Heath LNR.

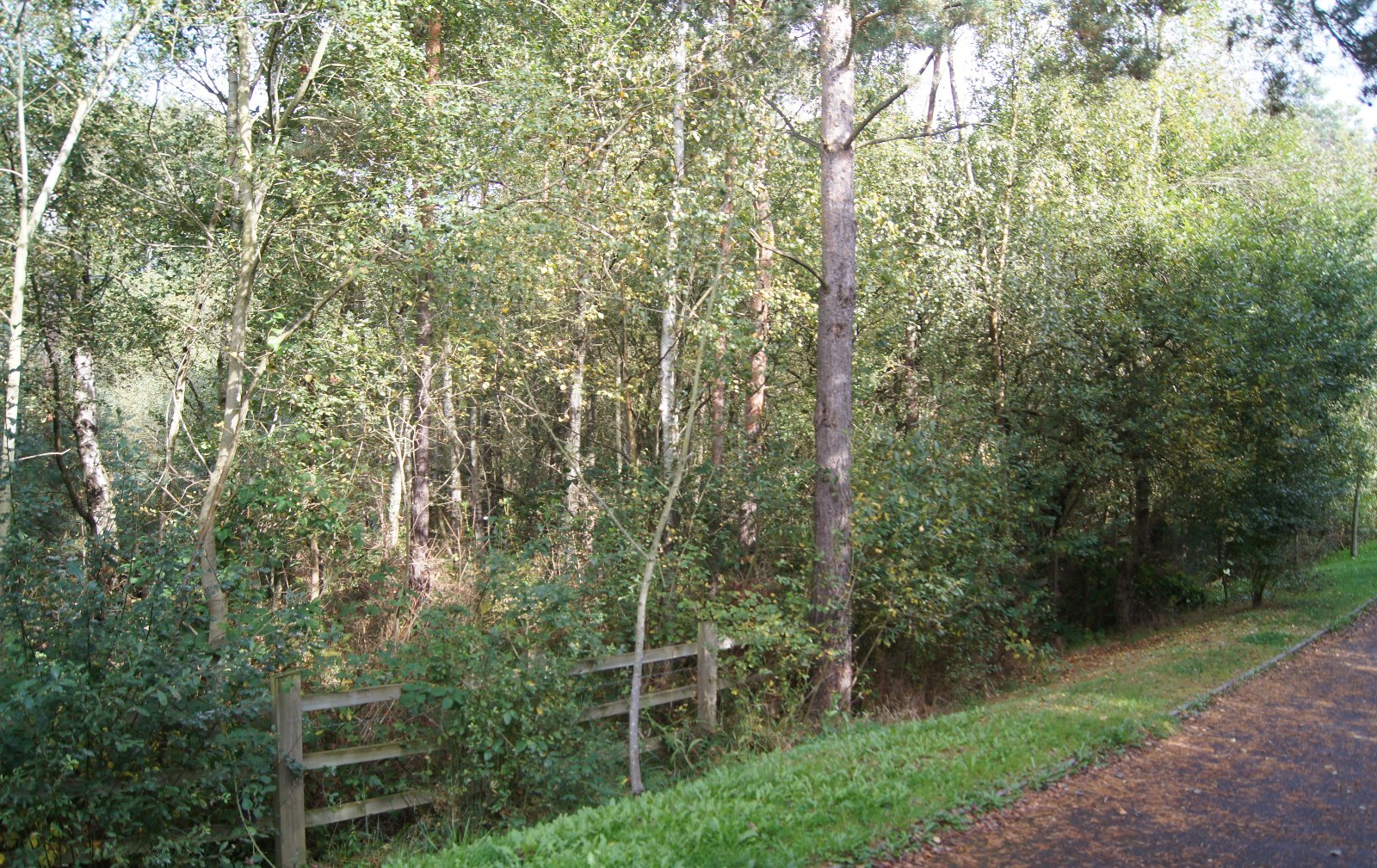
Path in Elvetham Heath LNR.

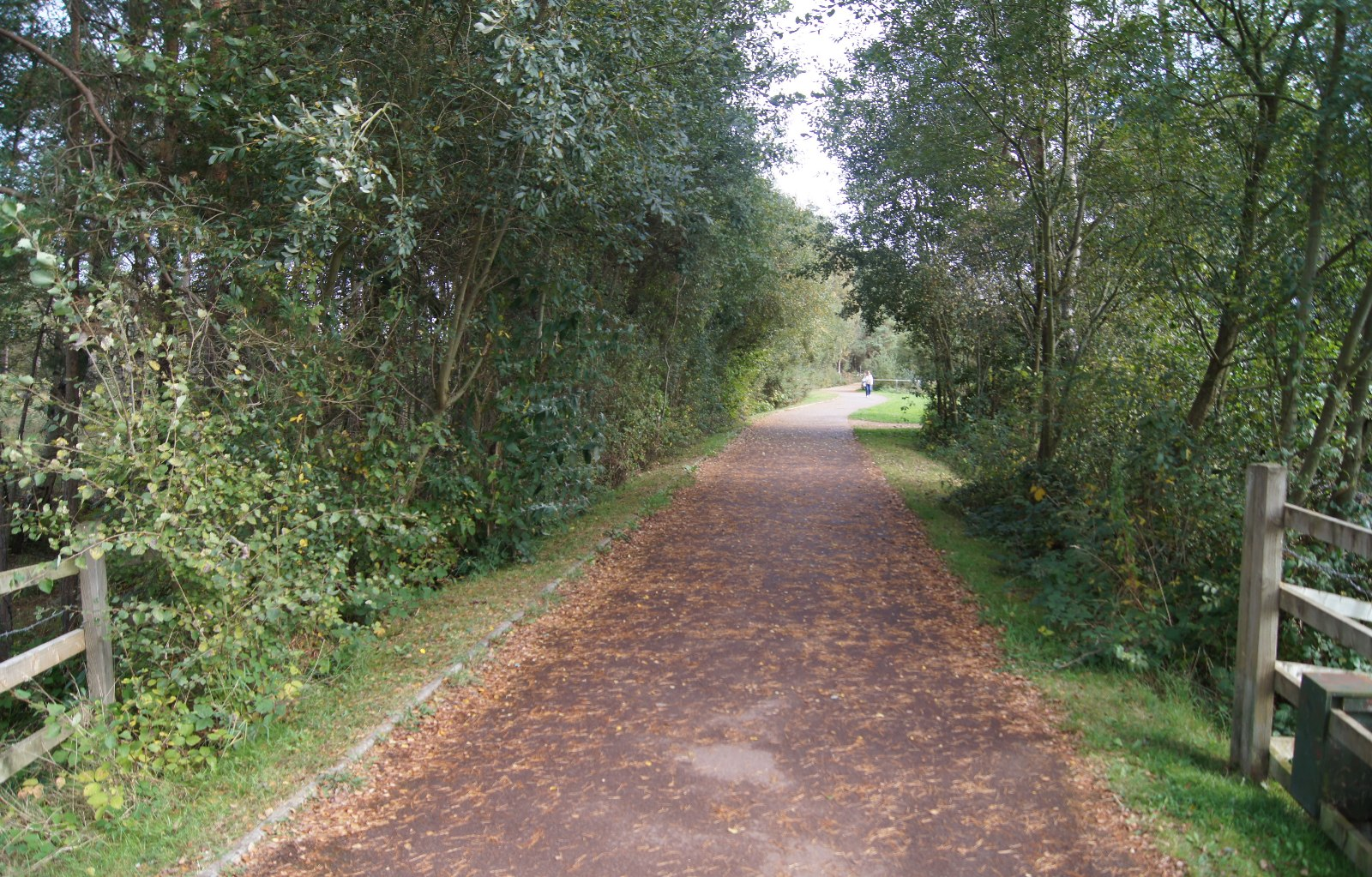
Path in Elvetham Heath LNR.
