= Peter Chalmers Cowan =

British civil engineer (1859–1930)

Peter Chalmers Cowan (20 March 1859 - 9 August 1930) was a British civil engineer particularly associated with projects in Ireland.

== Early life and education ==
Chalmers was born on 20 March 1859 in Peters Street, Murraygate, Dundee, Scotland, the son of merchant James Cowan and his wife Mary Ann Chalmers. He attended the High School of Dundee, and was then articled to a civil engineer, Robert Blackadder. He then studied at the University of Edinburgh from 1878 to 1881, having won a scholarship. He studied under Professor Fleeming Jenkin and later worked for a year as Jenkin’s assistant. He was awarded an honorary Doctorate of Science of the university in 1909.

== Career ==
In 1882, after being awarded a Vans Dunlop Scholarship, Chalmers travelled to the United States, and worked for T. G. Smith, the city surveyor of New York, briefly succeeding Smith as city surveyor. From 1882 to 1884, Chalmers was assistant engineer on the construction of the New York, West Shore and Buffalo Railway; he presented a student paper about the project to the Institution of Civil Engineers, winning the Miller Prize in 1884. Also in 1884, he was an assistant engineer on the Canadian Pacific Railway, responsible for railway works close to Lake Superior, before returning to the UK to work for the North-Eastern Sanitary Association, and on railway and dock works with Alexander Cunningham Boothby and John Macrae.

In 1886, Chalmers was appointed county surveyor of South Mayo, succeeding Edward Glover. Living at The Mall in Westport, County Mayo, Chalmers was responsible for 86 separate projects delivering roads, bridges and other structures. He also supported construction of new railways, and worked for the Sanitary Authority in designing water supply and sewerage facilities. He was also consulting engineer to the Piers and Roads Commission, working on the Achill swing bridge and viaduct and the Moy bridge near Ballina. In 1890, Chalmers became surveyor of County Down. From 23 January 1899 to 1920, he was chief engineering inspector for the Irish Local Government Board, succeeding Charles Philip Cotton. In parallel, from 1912, he succeeded Sir John George Baron as Commissioner of Valuation and Chief Boundary Surveyor of Ireland.

He became a campaigner for improvements to housing for the working class, writing three papers for the Engineering and Scientific Association of Ireland on sanitation, housing and industrial progress (he was president of the Association from 1915 to 1917). He was appointed technical advisor to the board and chairman of the Board's Housing Committee, before his appointment was abruptly terminated in February 1923. The Irish Times announced his 'retirement' on 19 April 1923.

In 1892 Chalmers became a full member of the Institution of Civil Engineers, and represented Ireland on the ICE's Council from 1921 to 1924. He was also a member of the Sanitary Institute, the Engineering Committee of the Road Board, the Royal Institute of the Architects of Ireland, the Institution of Water Engineers, and the Institution of Municipal and County Engineers. He was a member of the Institution of Civil Engineers of Ireland from 1900, and was president from 1911 to 1913. In his 1911 ICEI presidential address he called for protection of the term "engineer", limiting it to qualified persons, saying "There lingers in many influential quarters the idea that the construction and maintenance of roads, and the provision of water supplies, and sewerage schemes can be placed in the hands of uneducated, untrained, and unskilled men".

== Personal life ==
On 30 August 1888, he married Marion, daughter of Dr Alexander Johnston, of Westport, County Mayo. They had three sons (Frederick, Philip and Sidney; the latter were both killed in World War I while on service with the Royal Flying Corps, Frederick became a civil engineer) and one daughter (Hilda). Cowan died of a brain haemorrhage at Glendaragh Cottage in Church Road, Fleet, Hampshire on 9 August 1930.
