= All Saints Church, Crondall =

Coordinates: 51.2300°N 0.8631°W

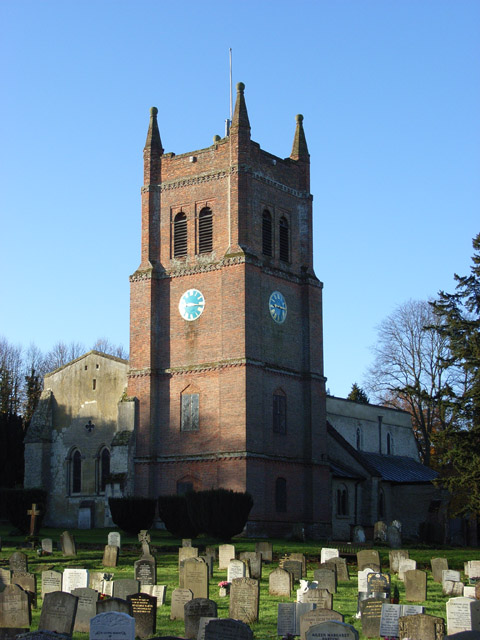
- All Saints Church, Crondall

- Location within Hampshire
- OS grid reference: SU 79478 48483
- Location: Crondall, Hampshire
- Country: England
- Denomination: Anglican
- Website: http://www.assm.org.uk/welcome.htm

History
- Status: Parish church
- Founded: c. 1170
- Dedication: All Saints

Architecture
- Functional status: Active
- Heritage designation: Listed building – Grade I
- Architectural type: Church
- Style: Norman, Early English, Perpendicular

Specifications
- Materials: Stone, brick

Administration
- Province: Canterbury
- Diocese: Diocese of Guildford

Clergy
- Bishop: Bishop of Guildford
- Vicar: Reverend Tara Hellings

All Saints Church is an Anglican parish church in the village of Crondall, Hampshire, England. It is a Grade I listed building and stands at the highest point in the village. Much of the church dates from the Norman period, although the original central tower was replaced by a brick one at the north-east corner in 1659 and some alterations, particularly to the fenestration, the nave arcades and transepts, and the north porch, were made in two stages during the 19th century.

According to Nikolaus Pevsner it is "a puzzle church and an extremely powerful one", while it has also been called "one of the finest parish churches in the country" and the "cathedral of North Hampshire" (Rev. Charles Stooks). Of the 19th-century restoration of the building, Simon Jenkins states that "for once the Victorian does not emerge the winner, especially in the chancel", which latter John Betjeman terms "splendid".

== History ==
=== Anglo-Saxon ===
An Anglo-Saxon church from the 9th century was built on the site of the current Norman church. At this time Alfred the Great owned the manor and hundred of Crondall, and the rector of Crondall had responsibility for the entire area of the hundred, which covered much of what is north-east Hampshire today, including Long Sutton, Aldershot and Yateley parishes all the way down to the Harrow Way. This responsibility continued after the Conquest, with Walkelin, the Bishop of Winchester, owning Crondall in 1086.

Domesday Book in 1086 gave the church's value as 20 shillings, but the only archaeological evidence of it today is a flint wall under the north transept and a blocked wall on the outside of the southern transept.

=== Norman ===
Archaeological work carried out under the nave arcade uncovered an earlier Norman church built on the foundations of the Anglo-Saxon church than the one we see today, constructed at roughly the same time as the Norman motte and bailey at Barley Pound. The current church was built in around 1170 on the order of Henry of Blois, Bishop of Winchester and King Stephen's half brother, possibly with the help of masons who had completed their work on Winchester Cathedral.

On the exterior, the south door and arch, west doorway, blocked north aisle window and string course are all Norman. The Romanesque arches of the nave were constructed on the foundation of the earlier Norman church, with the Transitional chancel being added at the end of the 12th century, probably being started around 1170, and the whole church being completed by the end of the century. The chancel has a quadripartite ribbed vault, with modern plaster between the ribs. The central boss is of the Lamb of God. There was a central tower, which was removed in 1659, the thrusting out of the responds between choir and nave being visible today, as are distortion in the vault ribs of the chancel.

The west doorway was constructed in c. 1200; Pevsner remarks on its "richly moulded arch", which is capped by a sculpted head.

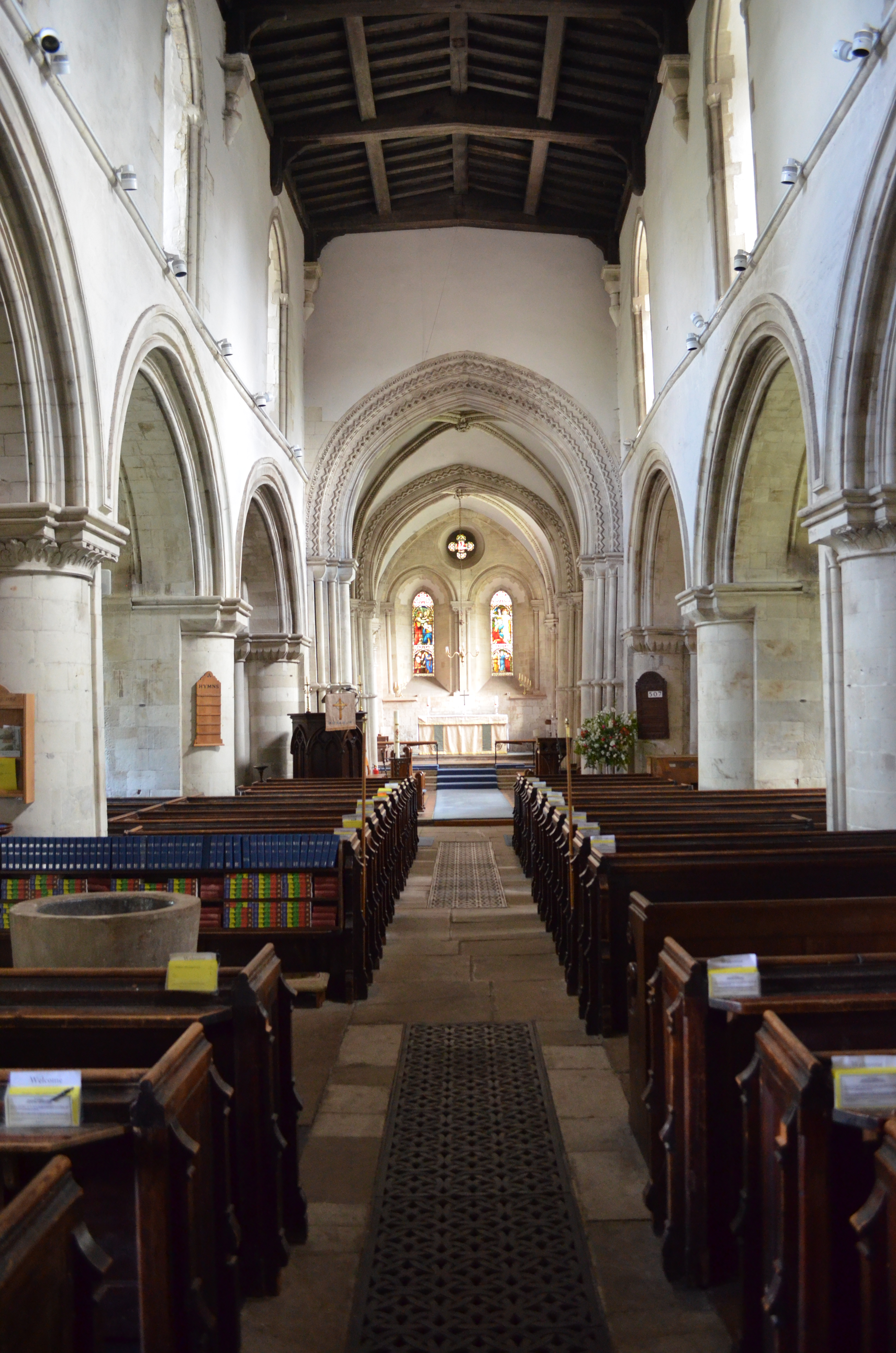
Nave, with 12th-century arches, leading to chancel of same period

The font in the nave is thought to be 12th century, although the anonymous church guide, as well as Jenkins (who comments it is "as shapeless as a Henry Moore"), claim that it comes from the original Anglo-Saxon church.

=== 13th–16th century ===
Until 1284 the avowson (the right to appoint vicars to the church) accompanied ownership of Crondall manor, but in that year John of Pontoise, Bishop of Winchester, gained control of appointments of rectors to Crondall (the rector in turn appointing a vicar) in return for the Priory and Convent of St Swithun gaining control of a number of manors. This right was changed in 1318, when the avowson of Crondall was granted to the Chapel of St Elizabeth, Winchester, although it is uncertain whether this, or the 1334 grant to the Priory and Convent of St Swithun, was realised. The rectory and avowson of Crondall were granted by Henry Beaufort, Bishop of Winchester, to the Hospital of St Cross in Winchester in 1446, a right it retained even after the Dissolution of the Monasteries.

There are three Crusader crosses on the east jamb of the doorway in the north porch, one of which might have been carved in the 13th century by Sir Alexander Giffard of Itchell Manor, who kept a vigil at the altar of the church before embarking on crusade. On the opposite doorway are crosses which by tradition are pilgrims' crosses made by pilgrims on the nearby Pilgrims' Way from Winchester to Canterbury before visiting the tomb of Thomas Becket in Canterbury Cathedral.

In 1538 the church became Anglican on Thomas Cromwell's injunction, following which the wall paintings inside the church were whitewashed, all candlesticks and images were removed, a wooden table replaced the stone altar and a Bible in English used for services, now conducted in English.

The windows on the southern side of the chancel date from the 14th century. There is a fine brass on the chancel floor to Nicholas de Kaerwent (vicar 1361–81; d. 1381), Rector of Crondall, which incorporates Fylfot crosses on the stole.

Two family tombs in the chancel recesses date from this period. The Gifford tomb on the south side ("Gyfford"; "Giffard") (1563) has the inscription: "Hereunder lyeth the body of John Gyfford Esquyer heyre aparant of Sir Wyll[ia]m Gyfford Knyght who had to wyfe Elizabethe one of the dawghters of Sir George Throkmarton Knight and had by her issue fyve sonnys and viii dawghters and so changyd this mortall lyfe the fyrst day of May in the yere of our Lorde God 1563 on whose soule Jesu have m'cy". The Paulet tomb on the north (1558) is to Sir George Paulet (d. 1532), a commissioner to the Dissolution and the younger brother of William Paulet, 1st Marquess of Winchester. Many of the inscriptions on this tomb have been erased, some deliberately.

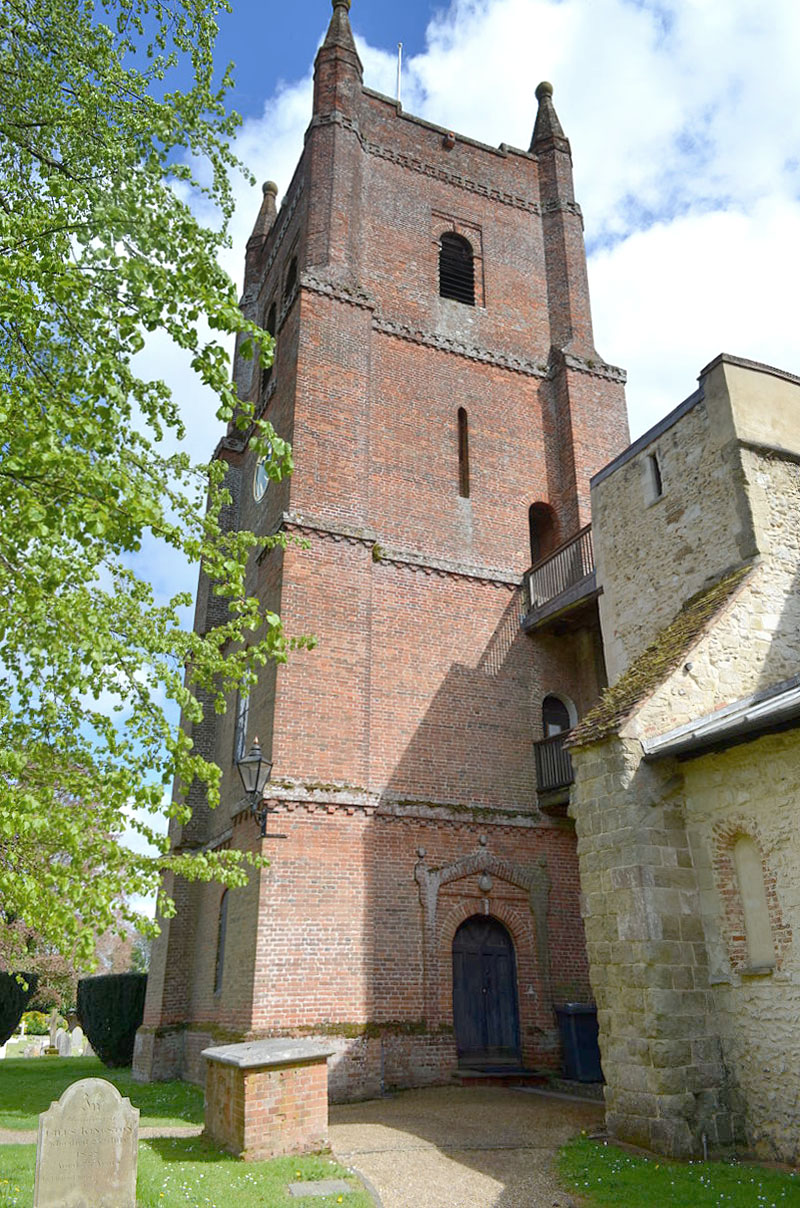
17th-century tower from west, showing two timber connecting galleries

=== 17th–18th century ===
In 1643 Parliamentarian soldiers seized the church under Colonel Birch, CIO to Major-General Sir William Waller. The building was soon heavily defended with entrenchments, and the church was further defaced. In subsequent years numerous sightings of the ghosts of Parliamentarian soldiers in the church's graveyard were reported, particularly of a mounted trooper who is said to disappear through a doorway having ridden up the avenue of limes.

A new bell frame was placed in the Norman tower in 1642, two additional bells were added and the roof covered with 1,200 lbs of lead. By 1657 there was sufficient concern about the stability of the Norman tower following this work that it was decided to bring it down and a new tower of four stages, detached from the church itself and modelled on the tower of St Matthews, Battersea, was built in its place in 1659. This work, which cost £428, took 32 men, 110,000 bricks and 62 loads of sand, and the old church was connected to the new tower by two timber galleries, "as if part of a Shakespearean theatre". The tower – a "proud tower", according to Betjeman – has a number of arched doorways and windows, and is capped by four octagonal pinnacles on the belfry. The six bells in the tower date from 1616 and 1619 (Henry Knight; the second bell from 1619 has been recast); 1650 (uncredited); and two, including the tenor, 1788 (Robert Wells). The clock in the north face of the tower was replaced in 1876 by one in the east face.

=== 19th century ===
There were two periods of building in the 19th century. The first, overseen by Benjamin Ferrey in 1847, saw the replacement of the galleries and pews, as well as the windows of the clerestory and the aisle, termed "wretched travesties of 12th-century style". Two lancet windows replaced the 15th-century window in the west wall, although the original remains. Pevsner states that the north doorway comes from this rebuilding. In his plan for the rebuilding, both transepts had rows of seats, the northern one being reserved for children. A much great set of alterations were carried out in 1871 by George Gilbert Scott, Jr., with the majority of work being done in the chancel, where the floor was raised and oak choir stools placed, and work done on the east fenestration. The outside walls of the church were also surfaced in cement stucco, which was removed post 1997 as it retained water, and a Bevington organ positioned in front of the west window.

=== 20th century ===
Very little work was done until 1971, when vicar John Hunt directed the removal of the organ and the installation of a new swell organ, with a console near the font (placed in the south transept in 1997). The roof of the chancel and the nave was releaded and the church also gained a modern heating system.

== Vicars ==
- 1230 – Simon the Parson
- 1248 – John the Parson
- 1283 – Peter de Guldeford
- 1288 – John de Berewyke
- 1289 – John Leycester
- 1312 – Simon de Farham
- 1317 – John the Vicar
- 1319 – Robert de Trumpesflete
- 1321 – Thomas de Stantone
- 1327 – John de Ferriby
- 1352–61 – John Lecche
- 1361–81 – Nicholas de Kaerwent
- 1364 – Thomas de Suttone
- 1375 – John Ivote
- 1376 – Robert Mayo
- 1381–97 – John de Wykeham
- 1387 – John Benstede
- 1445 – John Foxhoulds died
- 1445 – Avowson granted to the foundation of St Cross Hospital
- 1538 – John Wynman died
- 1538 – Henry Winnington
- 1560 – Peter Russell
- 1570 – Thomas Thompson
- 1624 – Raphael Reiniger
- 1630 – Lorkin Linely
- 1647 – Humphrey Weaver
- 1662 – Samuel Blundell
- 1678 – John Harrison
- 1683 – Richard Pauley
- 1714 – Thomas Sone
- 1747 – John Bourne
- 1782 – Charles Smith
- 1803 – John Crane
- 1808 – George Sherer
- 1809 – James Ogle
- 1833 – William Harrison
- 1891 – Malcolm Baynes
- 1898 – Edward Cotton
- 1919 – Cecil Stooks
- 1924 – Cyril Balmer
- 1932 – Roland Butterfield
- 1952 – Bernard Harrison
- 1958 – John Hunt
- 1975 – John Prior
- 1980 – James Voake
- 1991 – Paul Rich OBE
- 2006 – Karen Hutchinson
- 2012 – Tara Hellings

== Gallery ==
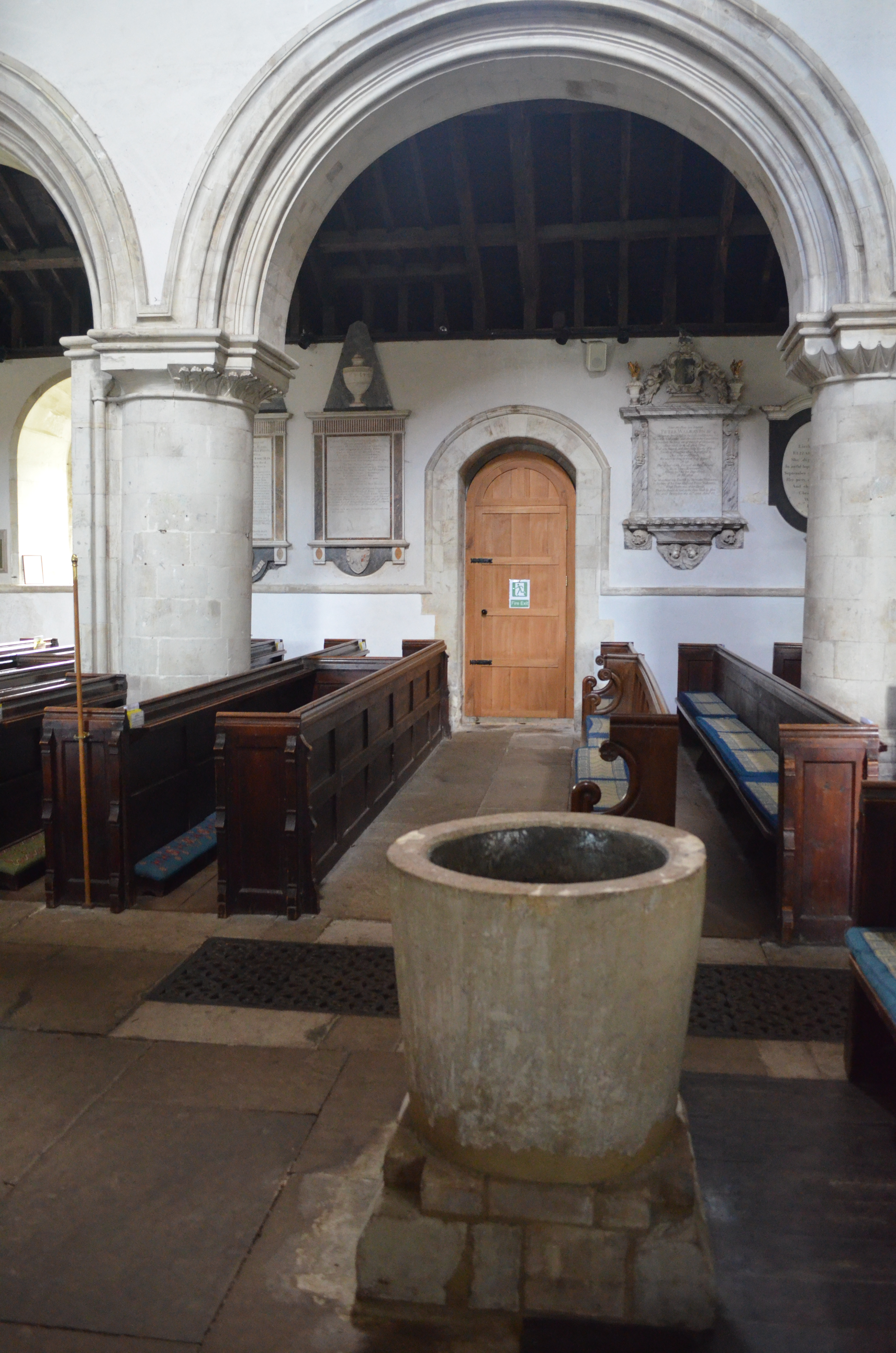
Font (date contentious, see text)

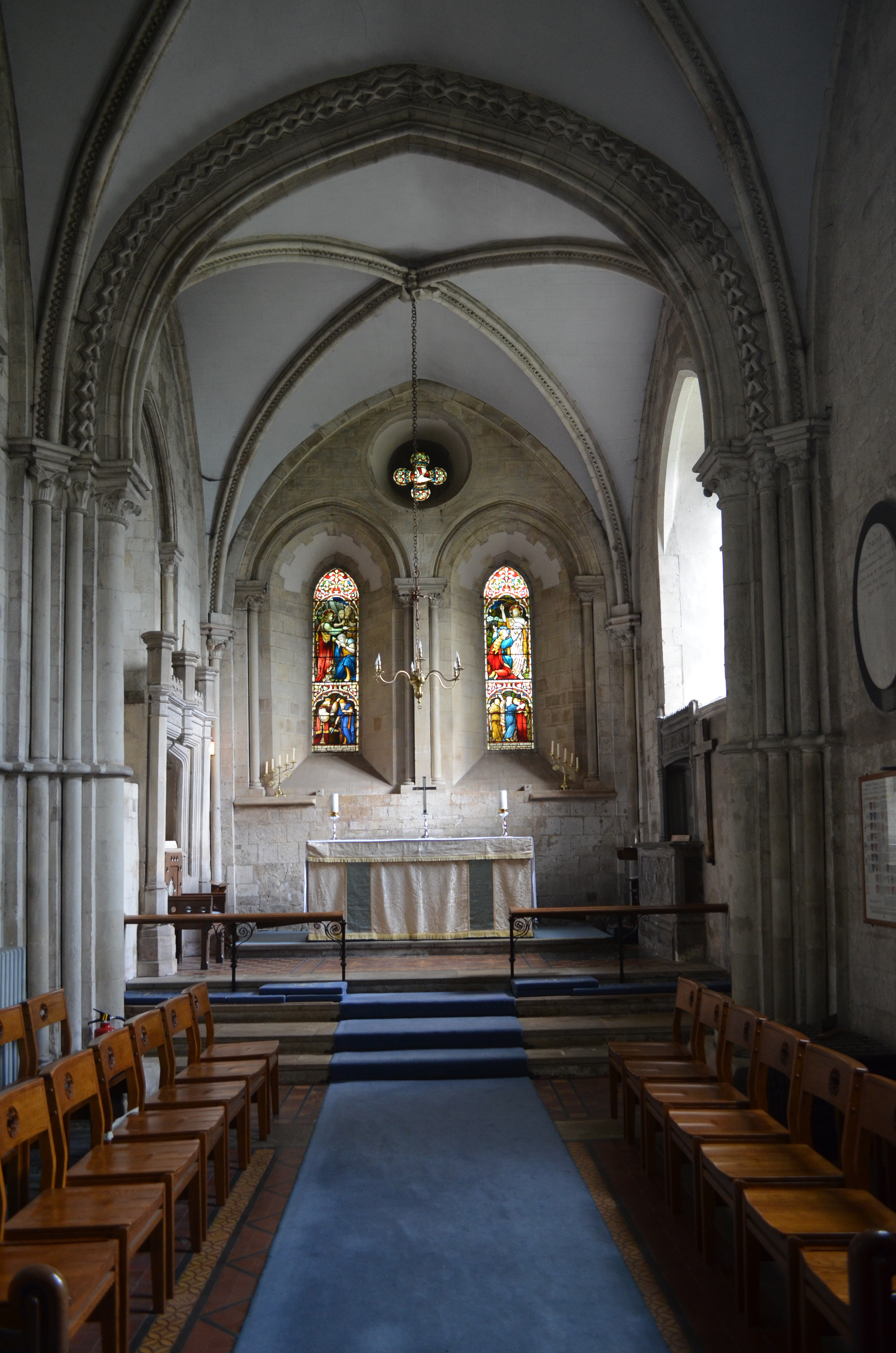
12th-century chancel

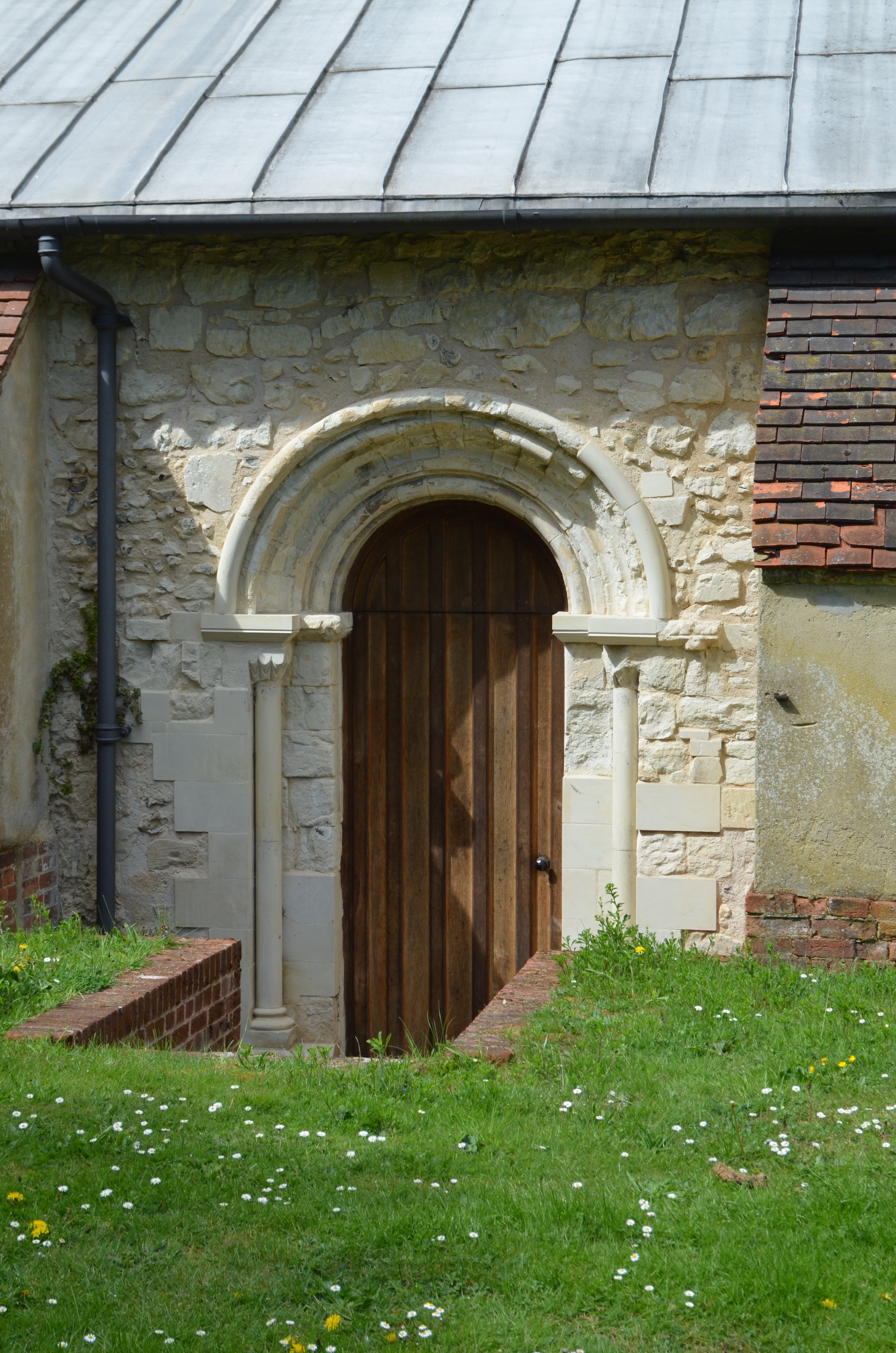
South door

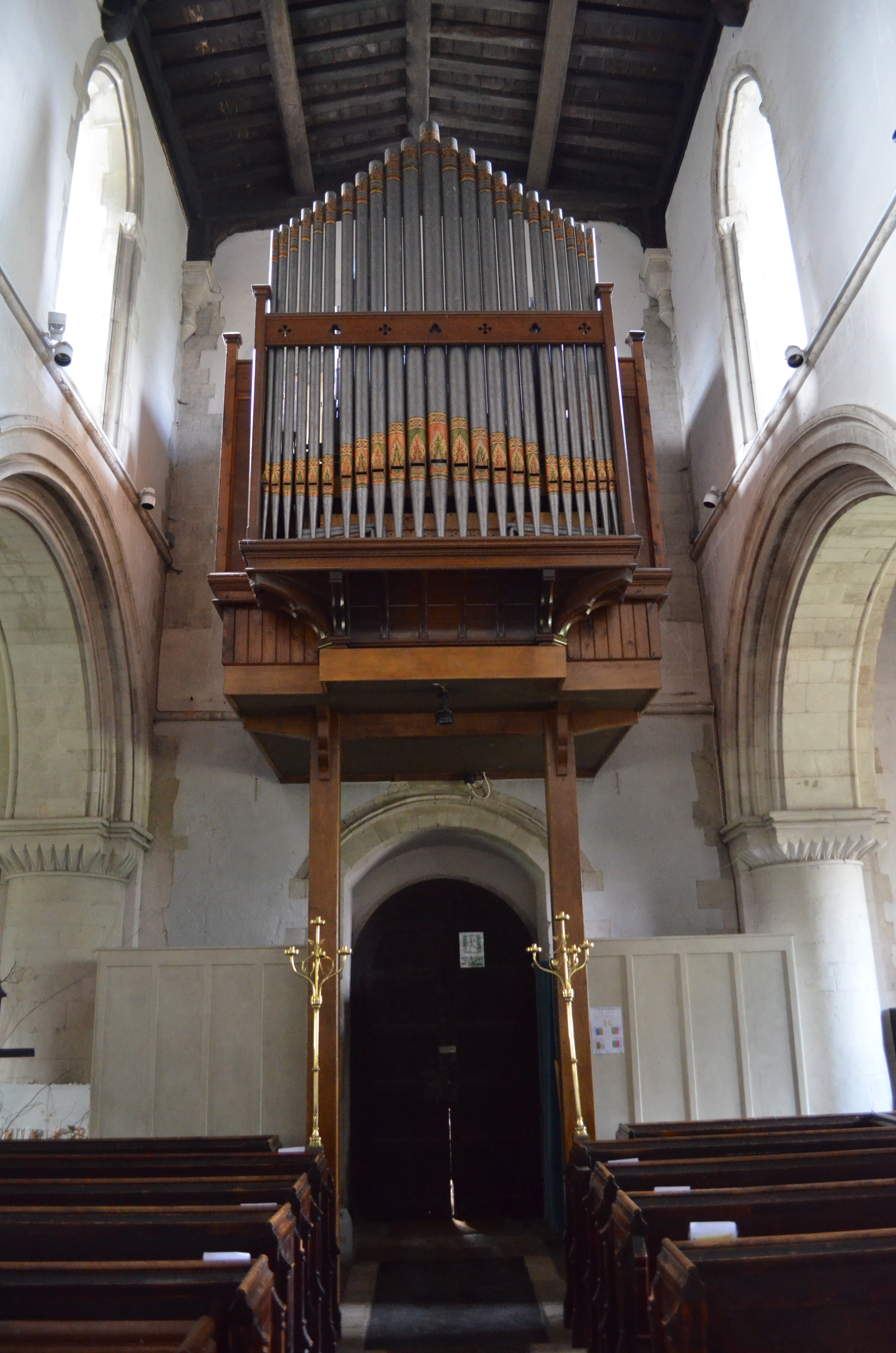
Organ at west end, blocking west window

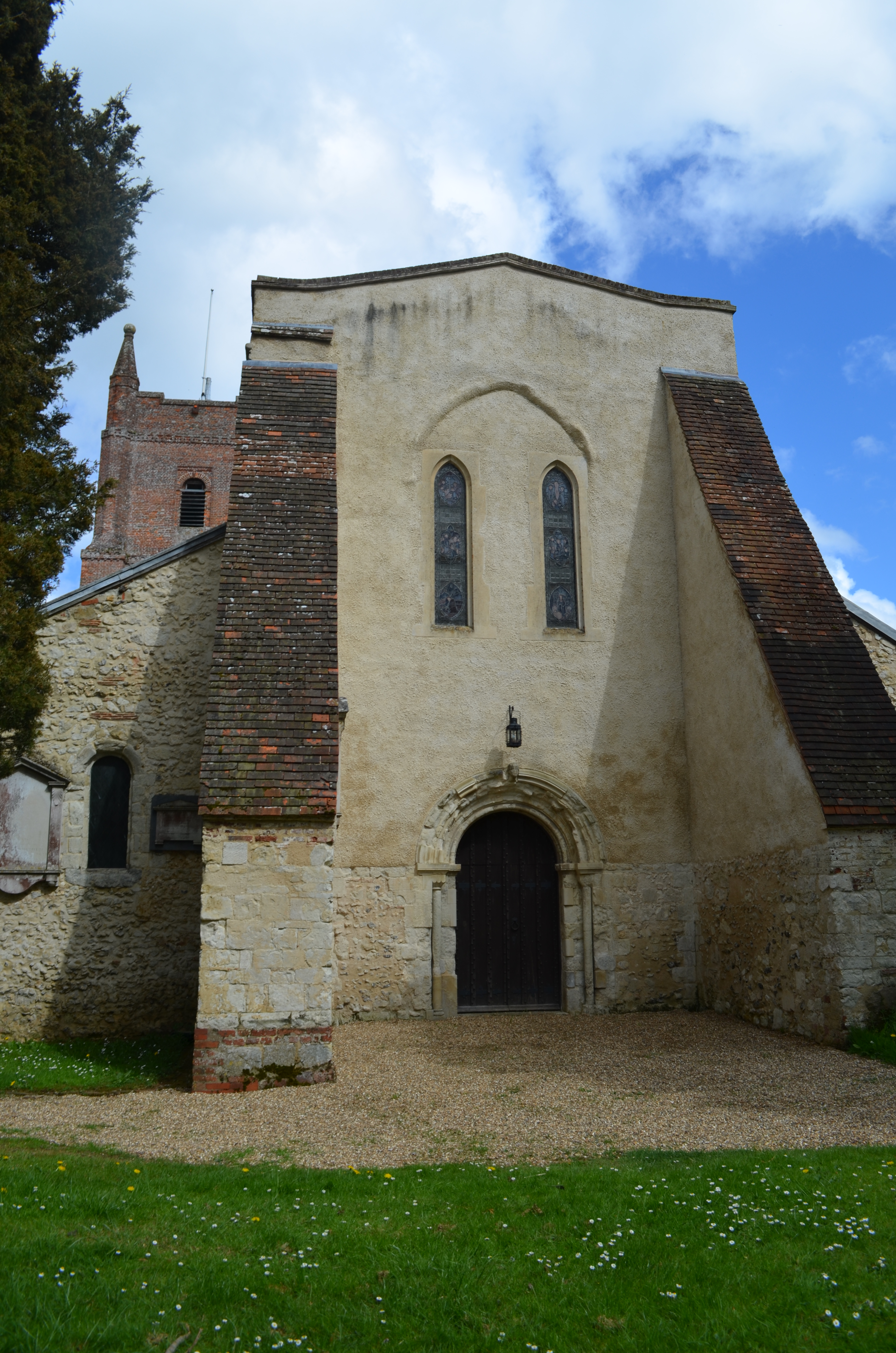
West end, with two 19th-century lancet windows under 15th-century hood

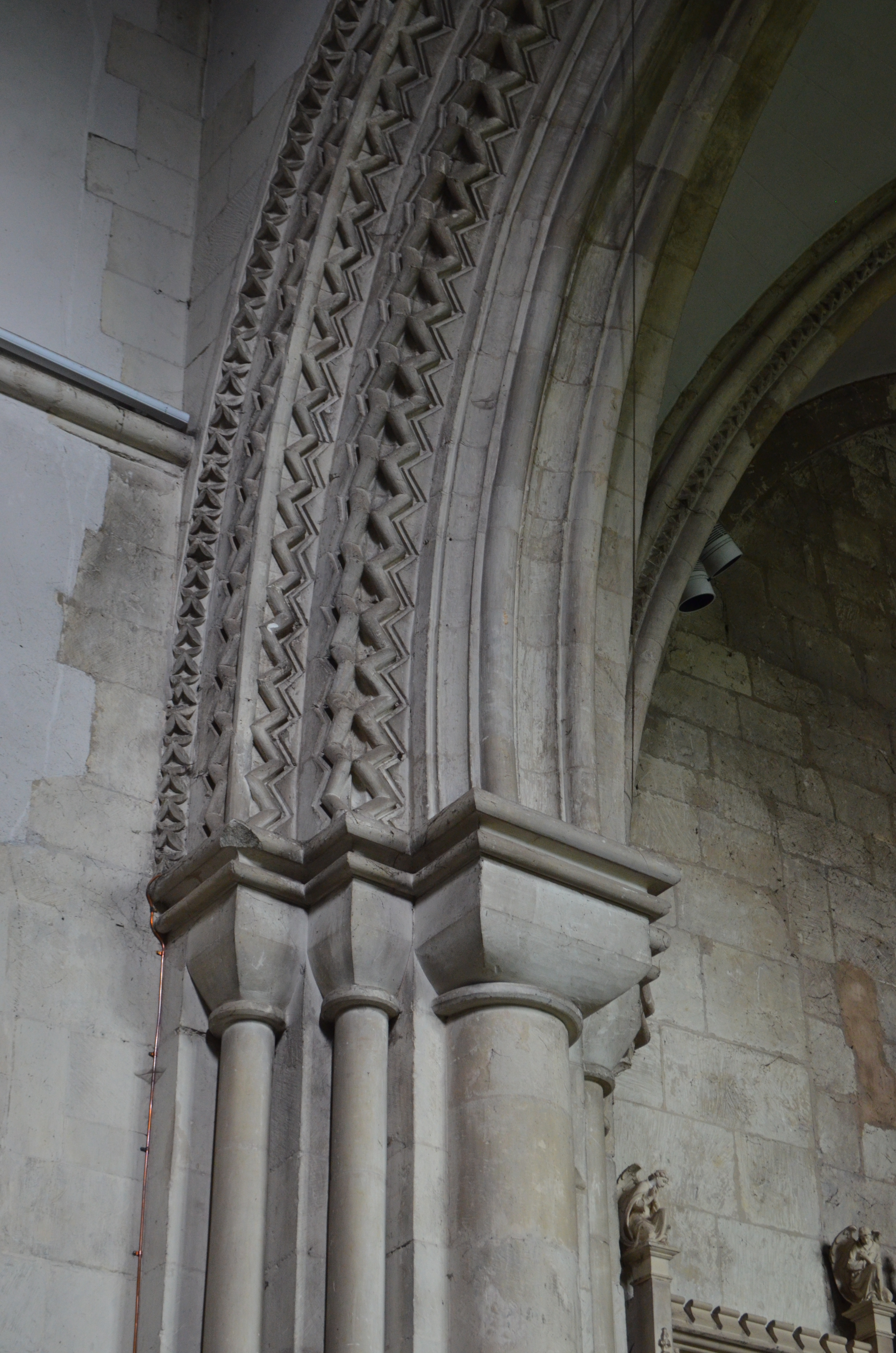
Dogtooth and zigzag ribs on arch between chancel and nave

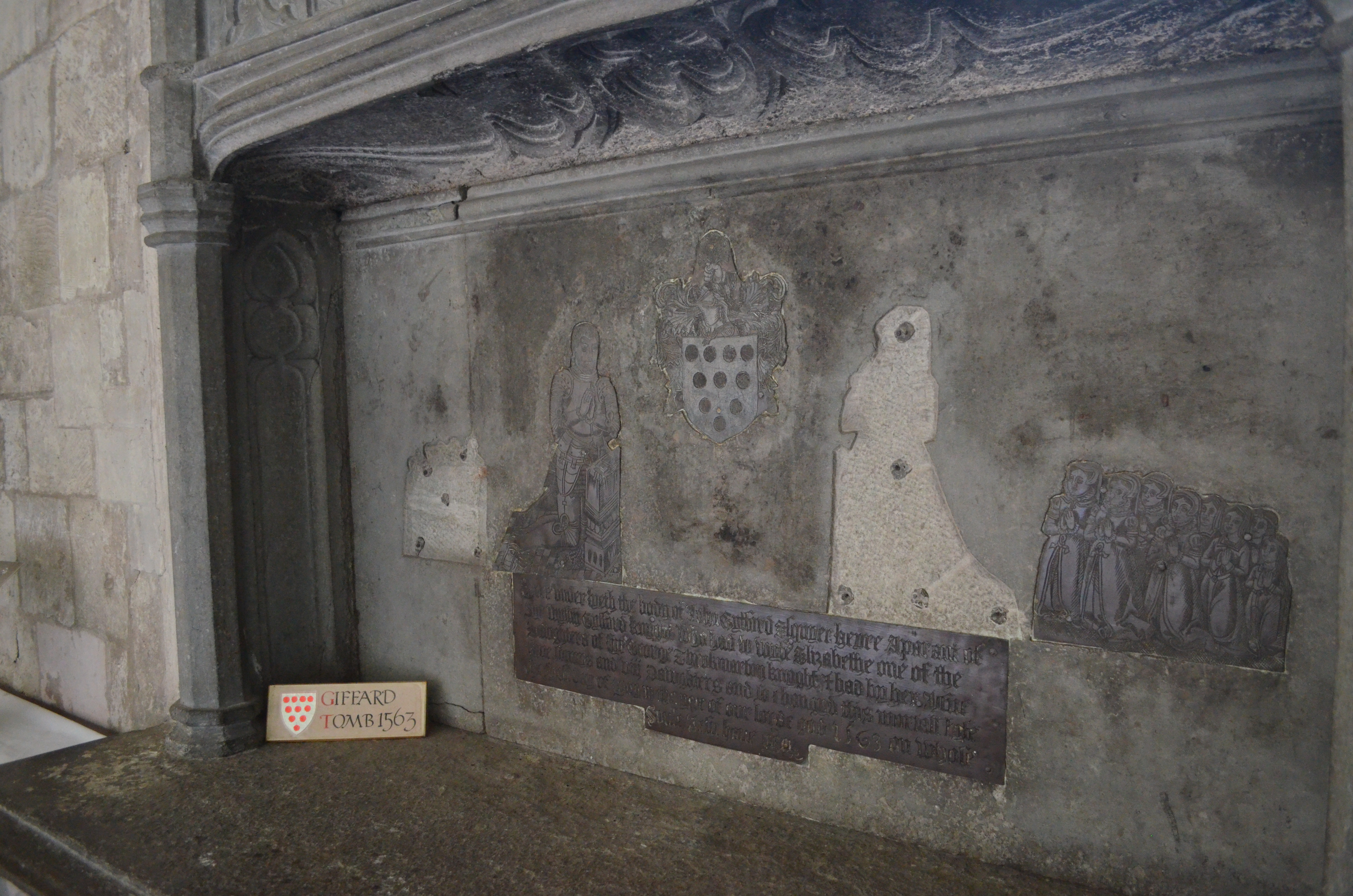
Giffard tomb

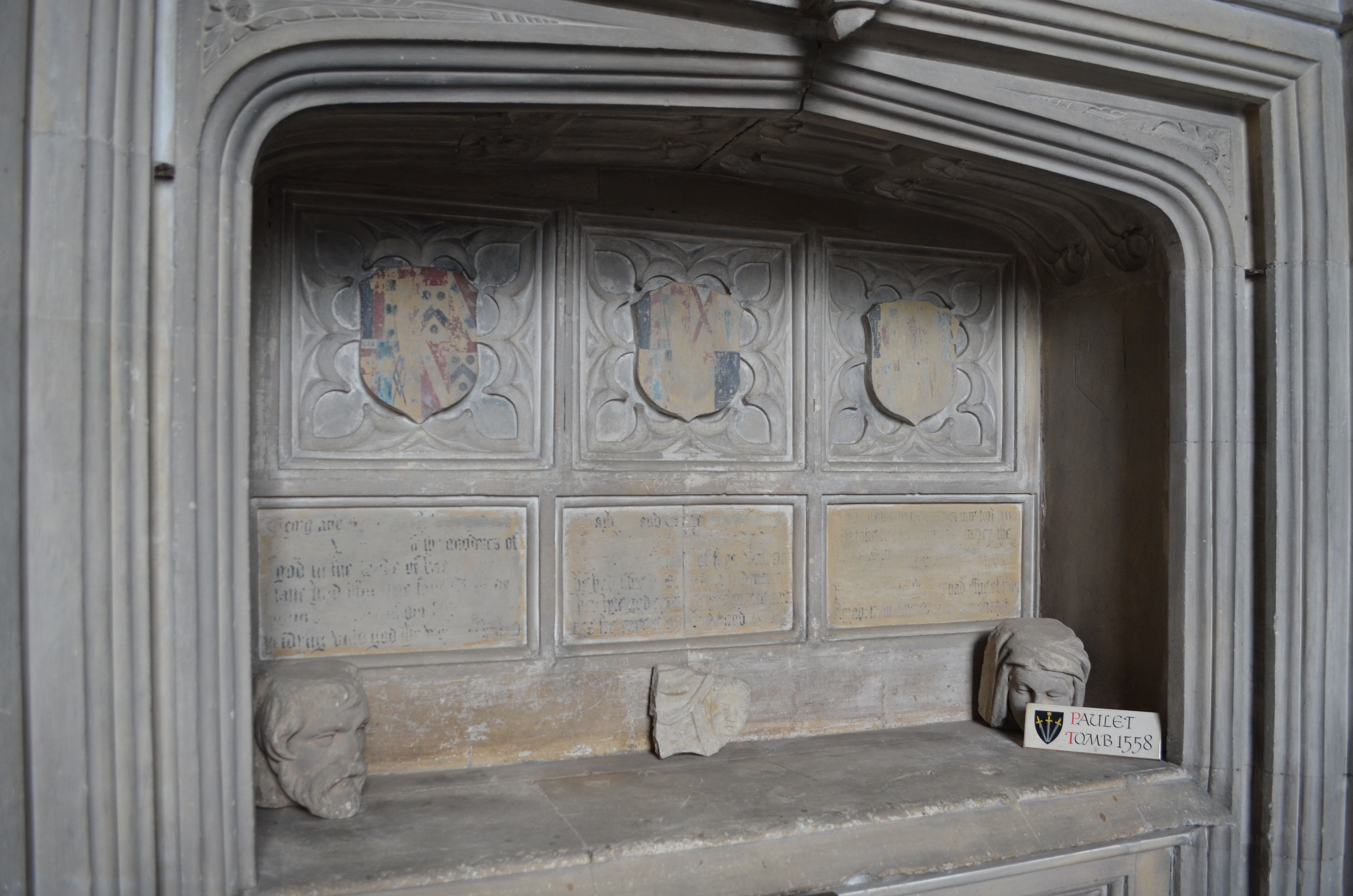
Paulet tomb
