= Francis Milburn Howlett =

British entomologist (1877–1920)

F. M. Howlett
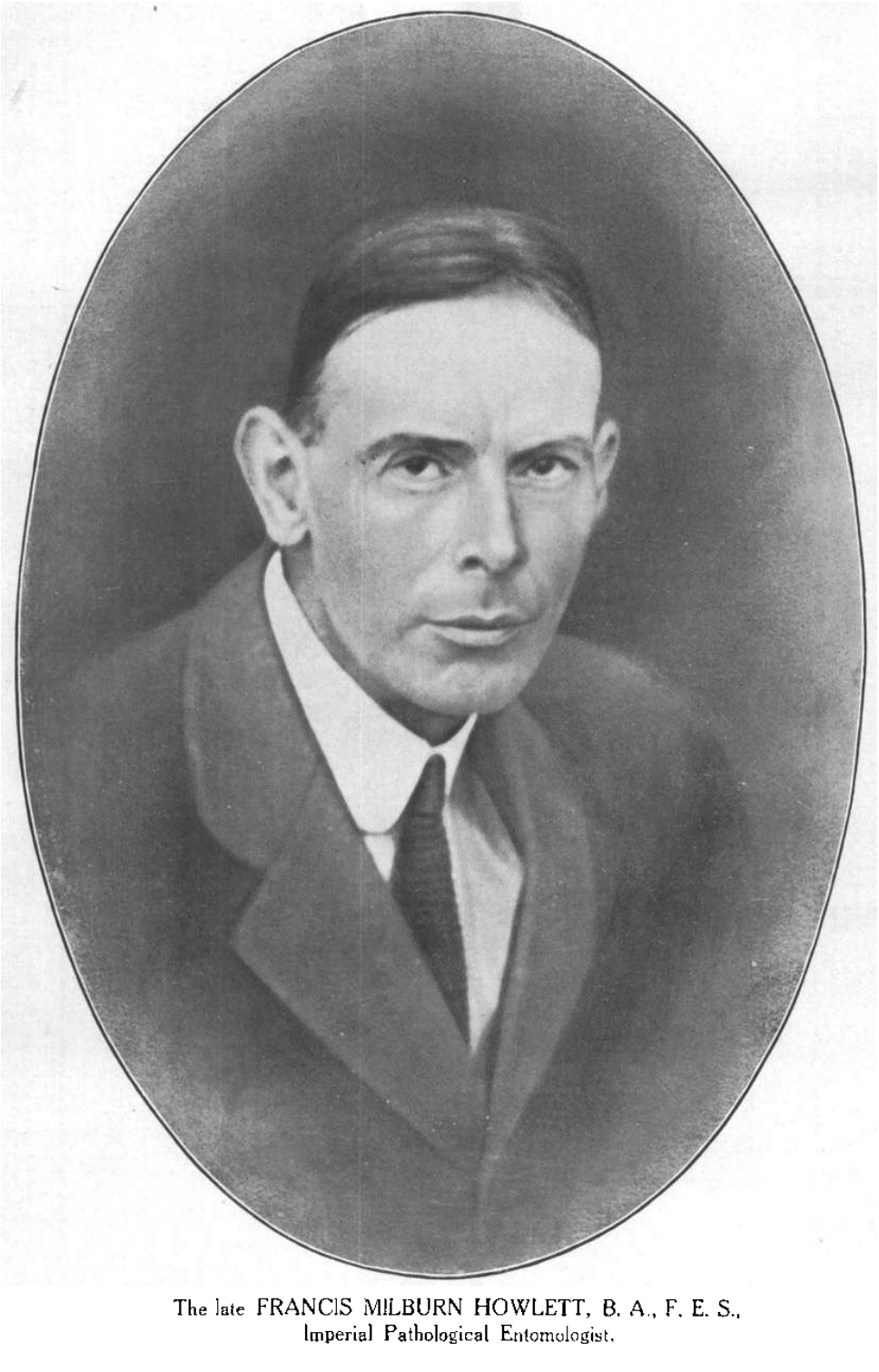
- Born: Francis Milburn Howlett; 5 January 1877; Wymondham, Norfolk, England
- Died: 20 August 1920 (aged 43); Mussoorie, India
- Education: Wymondham Grammar School; Bury St Edmunds Grammar School
- Alma mater: Christ's College, Cambridge
- Occupation: Entomologist
- Parents: Francis John Howlett (father); Mary Jane (mother)

Francis "Frank" Milburn Howlett (5 January 1877 – 20 August 1920) was a British entomologist who served in India as Second Imperial Entomologist, a position which was later changed to the Imperial Pathological Entomologist in India. He specialized in insects (mainly Diptera - sandflies) and parasitic ticks of medical and veterinary importance. A major discovery by him was the attractant methyl eugenol and its effect on flies in the genus Bactrocera.

== Life and work ==
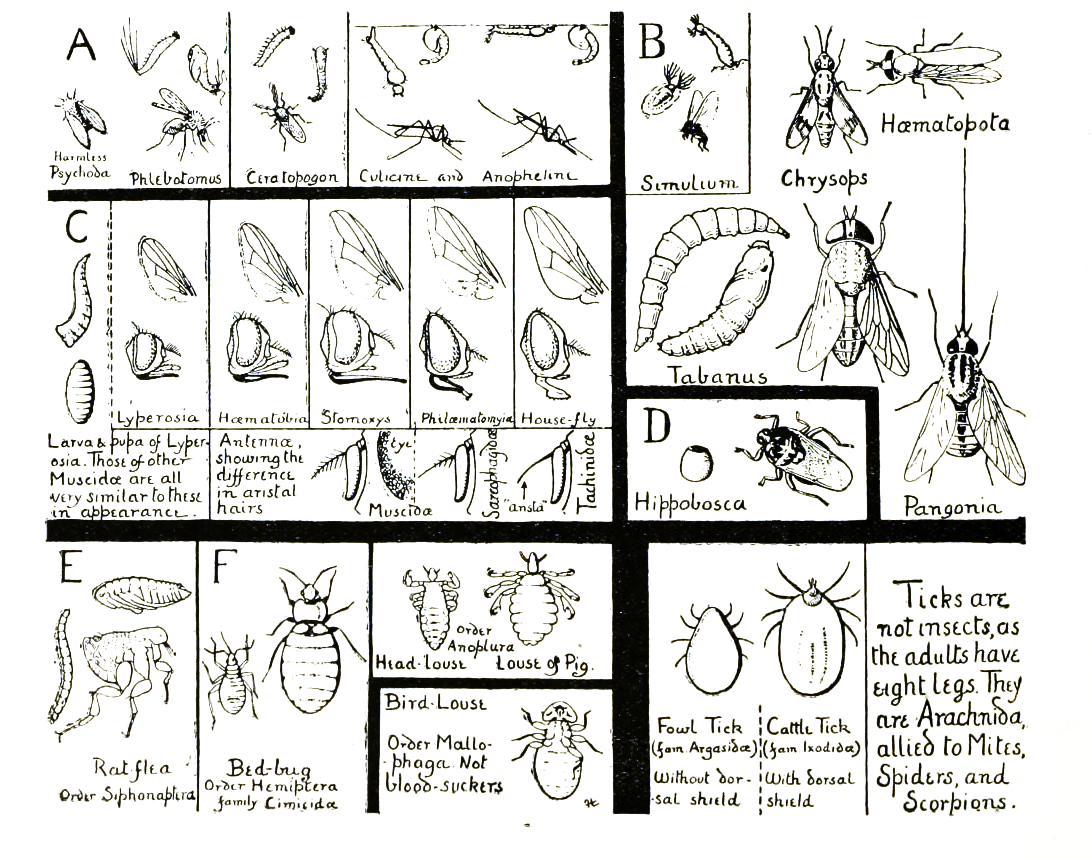
Illustrated key to blood-sucking arthropods by Howlett, 1909

Howlett was born in Wymondham, Norfolk, the son of Francis John Howlett, a solicitor, and Mary Jane née Milburn. He was educated at Wymondham Grammar School and Bury St Edmunds Grammar School, before he went to Christ's College, Cambridge. He attended the entomology classes of David Sharp alongside others like A.D. Imms, J.C.F. Fryer and Hugh Scott. He was an assistant master at Edinburgh Academy from 1900 to 1903 and at Holt Grammar School before being posted as a professor of natural science (which included the teaching of chemistry) at Muir Central College, Allahabad, from 1905 to 1908, initially in a temporary position (to replace E.G. Hill who was on furlough) which was then extended. He joined the Imperial Agricultural Research Institute at Pusa in December 1907 as Second (i.e. deputy) Imperial Entomologist under Harold Maxwell-Lefroy and from 1912 as Imperial Pathological Entomologist for the Government of India. In 1910 he was in England and Harold Maxwell-Lefroy deputed him to attend the first International Entomological Congress in Brussels, where he presented on the state of economic entomology in India and also on issues in preserving specimens in India. He left India during the First World War and worked with the Royal Army Medical College, while also attending various meetings of learned societies, and returned to India only in 1917. In 1919 he presided over the zoological section of the 6th Indian Science Congress at Bombay, giving a talk on "tactics against insects." One of his most important findings was the attraction of tephritid flies to methyl eugenol, a non-nutritive component that he identified from several others present in citronella oil. He noted how fleas disliked wet grass and noted a decline in plague during the onset of the rains and speculated that this made the plague rare in Bengal. He published a technique to trap thrips with attractant mixtures of Benzaldehyde, Cinnamaldehyde and Anisaldehyde. Howlett discovered that he could induce Stomoxys calcitrans to oviposit on cotton impregnated with valerianic acid, which is a component of fermenting vegetable matter. He noted the life history of mosquito larvae (Stegomyia, now Anopheles) that could survive in dry soil. He also studied the biology of sandflies. Howlett was also known for his humorous imitations and sketches at Pusa. He later moved to the Agricultural Research Institute at Pune. Howlett was an athlete and an artist who illustrated his own works. His health was poor during his service in India and he died a premature death at Terence Hall, Mussoorie from complications following a surgery. At the time of his death he was working on a book titled The Control of Harmful Insects. An obituarist in the Agricultural Journal of India noted that he was:

... a man of almost childlike simplicity and originality of outlook, and with many interests. ... He had the faults as well as the merits of the artistic temperament. ... He was a born schoolmaster, delighted in teaching, and could make all subjects interesting, and had the gift of implanting in his disciples some of his own enthusiasm. He was a combative apostle of pure research, and his disappearance from the ranks of scientists of this order will be a serious blow to the cause.

Howlett assisted Harold Maxwell-Lefroy in writing and illustrating the book Indian Insect Life. He wrote the sections on the flies and trained staff at Pusa in technical illustration. A species of tick, Haemaphysalis howletti, was described by Warburton in 1913 from a pony in Pakistan and in 1962 was found on rodents and birds in Pune, Maharashtra. Howlett developed techniques for collecting and preserving insects, the design of insect storage boxes (which came to be called the "Pusa Box"), and for marking insects (houseflies) to study dispersal. Howlett was also interested in techniques for scientific photography including stereo-photographs. Calcutta-based Italian entomologist Enrico Brunetti, named a fly after Howlett as Howlettia (now considered a synonym of Platypalpus Macquart, 1827 of family Hybotidae).

== Publications ==
Apart from the publications cited, Howlett's works include:

- Howlett, F. M. (1909). "Indian sandflies". Trans. Bombay Med. Congr. 3: 239–242.
- Howlett, F. M. (1910). "The influence of temperature upon the biting of mosquitoes". Parasitology. 3 (4): 479–484. doi:10.1017/S0031182000002304.
- Howlett, F. M. (1910). "On the Collection and Preservation of Insects". Parasitology. 3 (4): 485–489. doi:10.1017/S0031182000002316. ISSN 0031-1820.
- Copeman, S. M.; Howlett, F. M.; Merriman, G. (1911). An experimental Investigation on the Range of Flight of Flies. Reports to the Local Government Board on Public Health and Medical Subjects. pp. 1–10.
- Howlett, F. M. (1912). Report of the Imperial Pathological Entomologist.
- Howlett, F. M. (1914). Report of the Imperial Pathological Entomologist.
- Rieley, S. D.; Howlett, F.M. (1914). "Observations on Myiasis in Bihar". The Indian Medical Gazette. 49 (1): 8–10. PMC 5181144. PMID 29006192.
- Howlett, F. M. (1915). "A preliminary note on the identification of sandflies". Bulletin of Entomological Research. 6 (3): 293–296. doi:10.1017/S000748530004356X. ISSN 0007-4853. S2CID 85684920.
- Howlett, F. M. (1917). "Notes on head-and body-lice and upon temperature reactions of lice and mosquitoes". Parasitology. 10 (1): 186–188. doi:10.1017/S0031182000003759.
