= Imperial Entomologist =

Imperial Entomologist was a position in British India for an entomologist, it was created mainly for applied entomology in pest control and for utilization of useful insects such as honey bees, lac insects, and who was also involved in research and developing control measures against insects of veterinary and medical importance. A second position was created initially but that was later redesignated as Imperial Pathological Entomologist. Both positions were abolished after Indian independence in 1947.

The position was occupied by:

- 1903–1912 Harold Maxwell-Lefroy who replaced the government position of entomologist briefly held by Lionel de Niceville in 1901
- 1913–1934 Thomas Bainbrigge Fletcher
- Muhammad Afzal Husain (Acting Imperial Entomologist, 1926)
- 1934–c.1944 Hem Singh Pruthi
- c.1944–1947 P.V. Isaac
- 1947 Position abolished

In 1907 Frank Milburn Howlett was appointed Second (ie Deputy) Entomologist; he was given the title Imperial Pathological Entomologist in 1912.
