= Charles William Mason =

British entomologist (1884–1917)

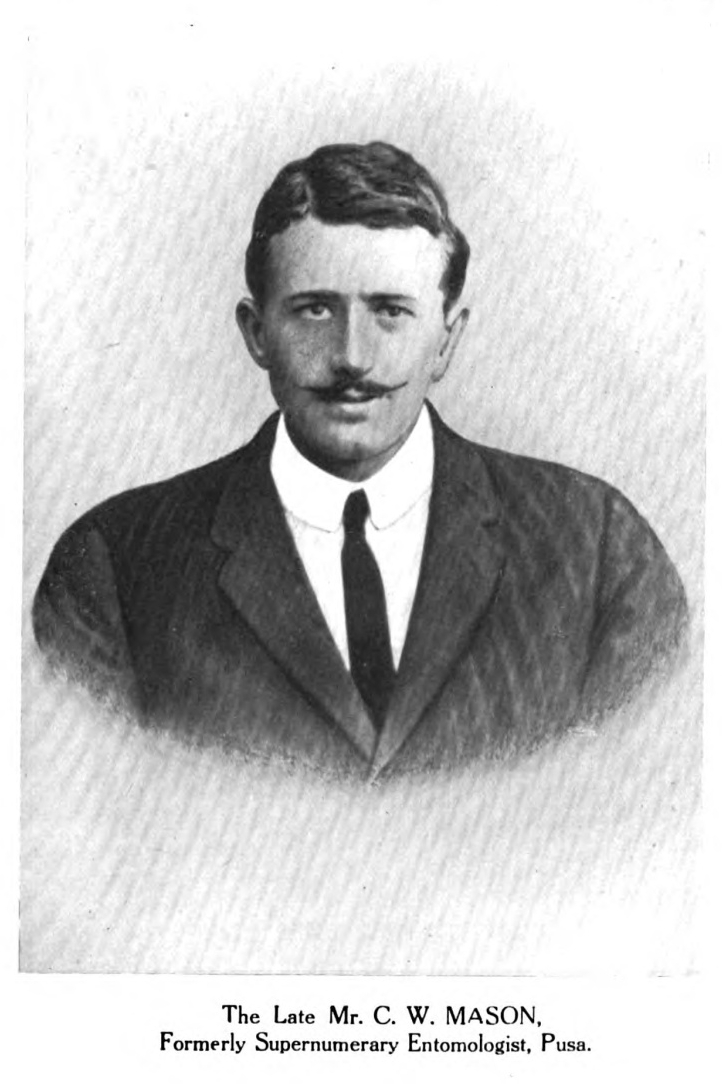

Charles William Mason (13 May 1884 – 28 November 1917) was an Agricultural entomologist who served in British India. He conducted a pioneering study on the role of birds in Indian agriculture which he published in 1911 along with Harold Maxwell-Lefroy, making him one of the early contributors to the field of economic ornithology.

== Life and work ==
Mason was born in Surbiton, Surrey to engineer William Joshua and Eliza Emily née Walters. He studied at Haileybury College and went to work at the Agricultural Research Institute at Pusa in 1906. From 1907, as first supernumerary entomologist, he conducted studies on the food of birds in India, examining the gut contents of 1325 birds. This was used to classify the birds as harmful, beneficial or neutral in terms of their role in agriculture. He made use of numerical counts of food items eaten, following a system of Robert Newstead, rather than quantify them by biomass. He identified that birds did not play a role as destroyers of weeds through seed eating. The report was published in 1911, coauthored with the Imperial Entomologist, Harold Maxwell-Lefroy. He trained at the Southeastern Agricultural College, Wye in 1910 and in July 1913, he went to study entomology as a Carnegie student at the laboratory of parasitology of the Bureau of Entomology of the United States Department of Agriculture at Melrose Highlands, Massachusetts, before moving to Nyasaland (Malawi) to succeed Edward Ballard as Government Entomologist. He also served with the Nyasaland Volunteer Reserve. He died of black-water fever (malaria) at the Government Farm, Namiwawa, Malawi.

A memorial plaque exists in the St. James' Church, Shaftesbury and his name is included in the Cann War Memorial, Shaftesbury and in the Haileybury College War Memorial.
