= Thomas Bainbrigge Fletcher =

English entomologist (1878–1950)

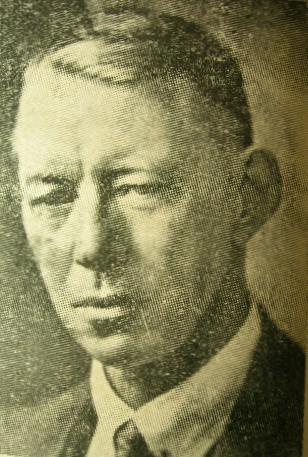
- Born: 25 March 1878; Stonehouse (Plymouth), Devon, England
- Died: 30 April 1950
- Known for: List of Publications On Indian Entomology and a Catalogue of Indian Insects
- Spouse: Esme Violet Hollingbery
- Scientific career
- Fields: Entomology
- Institutions: Royal Navy, Indian Agricultural Research Institute

Thomas Bainbrigge Fletcher (25 March 1878 – 30 April 1950) was an English entomologist. Although an amateur lepidopterist who worked in the Royal Navy, he became an expert on "microlepidoptera" and was appointed as the second Imperial Entomologist in India to succeed Harold Maxwell Lefroy. He is credited with reorganizing entomological research in India by coordinating and directing research, sharing findings and reducing duplication of research work.

== Biography ==
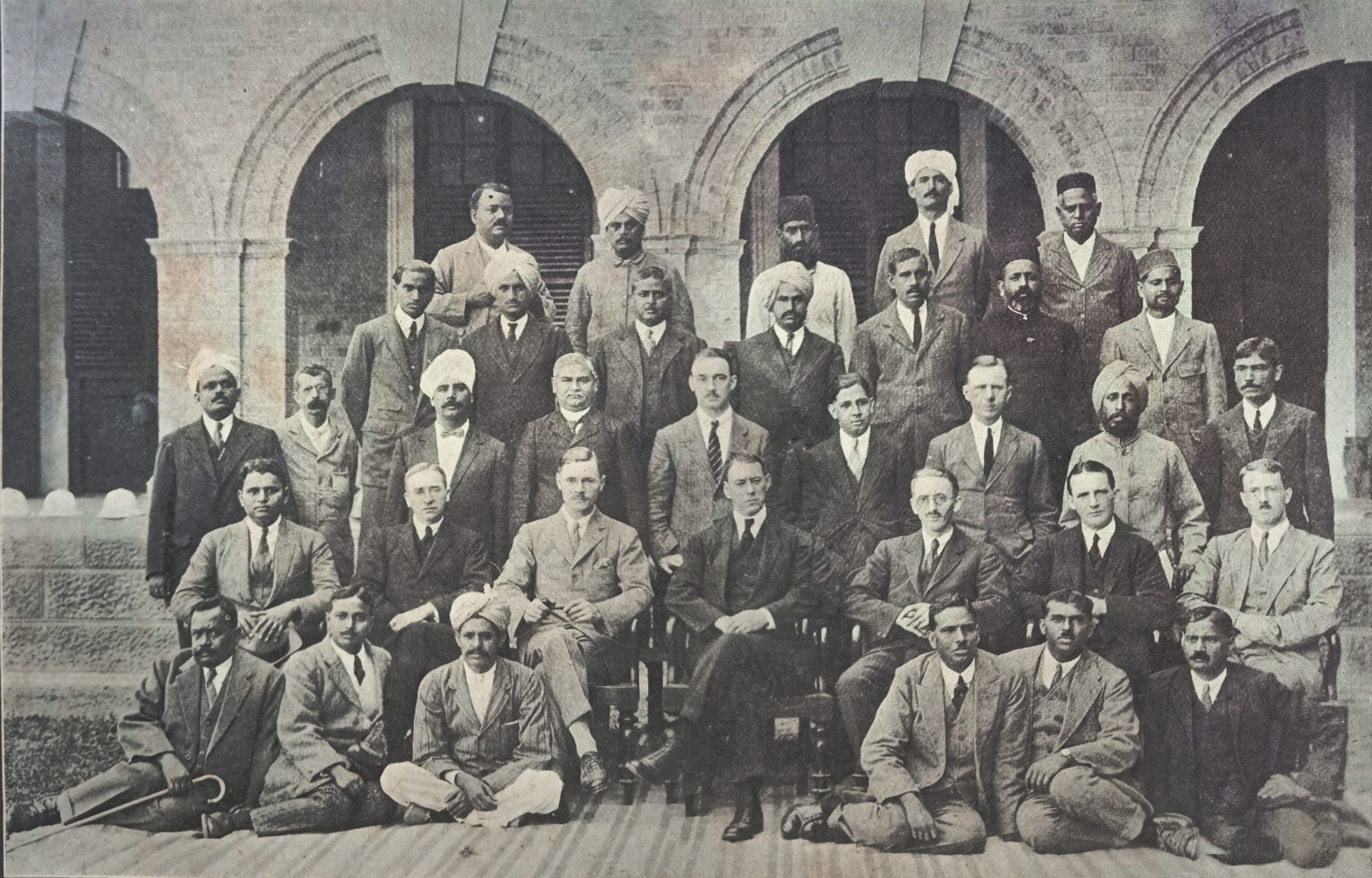
Fletcher (seated at centre) at the fifth entomological meeting at Pusa in 1923

Fletcher was born in Stonehouse, Plymouth, his father William Bainbrigge Fletcher was a fleet surgeon in the Royal Navy (retired 1890). Fletcher studied at Dulwich college and joined the Navy to become a clerk on HMS Inflexible in 1896. He became a naval paymaster until he retired in 1915. While in the navy, he joined the Percy Sladen Trust Expedition to the Indian Ocean and from 1911 he was also government entomologist for the Madras Presidency. In 1913 he was appointed Imperial Entomologist in India, succeeding Harold Maxwell-Lefroy at the Imperial Agricultural Research Institute at Pusa. In 1915 he was granted a naval pension as Fleet Paymaster. Although lacking academic qualifications in entomology, he was a meticulous naturalist and very careful on matters of systematics and taxonomic nomenclature. His work as head of entomological research in India was initially on identifying work that had already been done and that which was ongoing. By conducting meetings of researchers he ensured that duplication was avoided.

At the third entomological meeting in 1919 he made a call for a boycott of German tools and a call to ignore German publications from 1914 citing a practice called for by Sir George Hampson. During World War II, insect collections and books from the Natural History Museum were moved to his home in Gloucestershire.

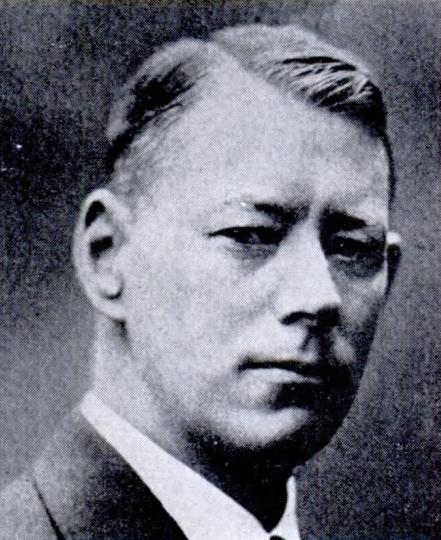

He produced a List of Publications On Indian Entomology and a Catalogue of Indian Insects. He also worked out the life-histories of many moth species in the families Gelechidae, Cosmopterygidae, Neopseutidae and Tortricidae and produced A List of Generic Names used for Microlepidoptera (1929). He also wrote several more general works on entomology including Some South Indian Insects (1914), Tentative Keys to the Orders and families of Indian insects (1926), A Veterinary Entomology for India and Hints On Collecting and Preserving Insects. His knowledge of classical Greek, Latin and French and a popular style of writing also allowed him to write for lay audiences. His book Birds of an Indian Garden with Charles M. Inglis was meant for non-specialist readers. Fletcher was a fellow of the Linnean Society, the Royal Entomological Society, Zoological Society of London and a president of the Cotteswold Naturalists' Field Club. He married Esme Violet Hollingbery at Saidpur, Uttar Pradesh, on 17 February 1917. His wife left India and was hospitalized in London for many years. He left India in 1932 and settled in Rodborough Fort, Stroud. A chateau where he set up a large collection of insects and books. A room was devoted to a newspaper archive of The Times. In 1947, he suffered from a stroke that left him partly paralysed on the right side. He donated the bulk of Rodborough Common in Gloucestershire to the National Trust in 1937 (after the National Trust declined an earlier offer in 1935). In 1949 he filed for bankruptcy but his assets were valued at £4762, enough to pay off his debts of £1119.

His position as Imperial Entomologist was succeeded by Hem Singh Pruthi.

To any in search of a distraction or a hobby, either to fill an idle hour to provide a welcome change of thought and occupation, the study of Entomology may well be commended. Insects are always with us, by day and by night, in the bungalow, at the office or in camp, and the field for observation of life-histories and habits, even of the commonest species, is absolutely boundless. If this book lends aid to any whose tastes lie in this direction, its aim will have been achieved. Gratus certe labor, quo scientiae nitor magnopere augetur.

— Preface to Some South Indian Insects

Species named after him include:

- Basilia fletcheri

== Publications ==
A partial list of publications include:

- Fletcher, T. B. (1926). Tentative Keys to the Orders and Families of Indian Insects. Bull. Agric. Res. Inst. Pusa, No. 162,
- Fletcher, T. B. and C. M. Inglis (1924). Birds of an Indian Garden. Calcutta & Simla: Thacker, Spink & Co.
- Fletcher, T. B. (1914). Some South Indian Insects. By Superintendent Government Press, Madras.
- ———— (1910). "The Orneodidae and Pterophoridae of the Seychelles Expedition". Transactions of the Linnean Society of London. 13: 397-403.
- ———— (1920). Life-Histories of Indian Insects: Microlepidoptera. Pterophoridae
- ———— (1933). Life Histories of Indian Microlepidoptera. Scientific Monograph No.4: 1-169.
- ———— (1916). "One Hundred Notes On Indian Insects". Bulletin No. 59. Agricultural Research Institute, Pusa.
