= Manzur Qadir =

Pakistani jurist (1913–1974)

- منظور قادر

6th Minister of Foreign Affairs
- In office 29 October 1958 – 8 June 1962
- President: Ayub Khan
- Preceded by: Feroz Khan Noon
- Succeeded by: Muhammad Ali Bogra

Personal details
- Born: 28 November 1913 Lahore, British India
- Died: 12 October 1974 (aged 60) London, England
- Party: All-India Muslim League (Before 1947); Muslim League (1947–1958)

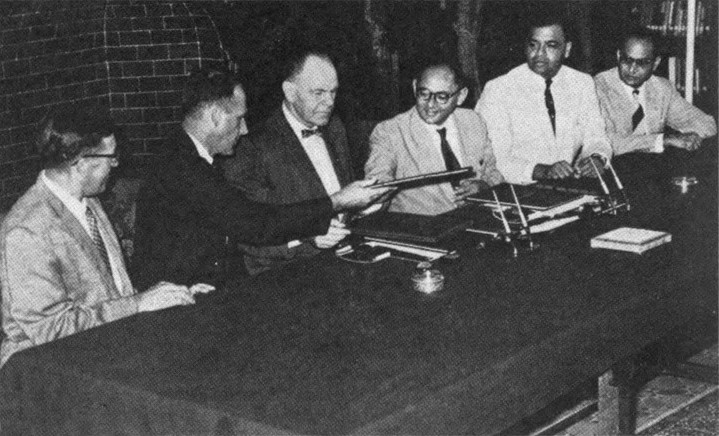
Exchange of the instruments of ratification for the Pakistan–United States Double Taxation Convention in Karachi, 21 May 1959. From left: Commercial Attaché Hubert M. Curry, Counsellor for Economic Affairs Thomas C.M. Robinson, U.S. Ambassador James M. Langley, Foreign Minister Manzur Qadir, Chief of Protocol Maqbool Rabb, and Joint Secretary Quamrul Islam.

Manzur Qadir (Urdu: منظور قادر; 28 November 1913 – 12 October 1974) was a Pakistani jurist and politician who served as the Foreign Minister of Pakistan in the military government of Ayub Khan from 1958 to 1962. Manzur Qadir served as the Chief Justice of Lahore High Court from 1962–1963.

He was the son of Sir Abdul Qadir. He married Asghari, a daughter of Fazl-i-Hussain, a political leader of Punjab, British India. This was Asghari's second marriage. After his demise, his associate Ijaz Husain Batalvi annually organized Mazur Qadir memorial lectures attended by hundred of thousands of lawyers and judges, this practice was continued by his associate Akhtar Aly Kureshy for Ijaz Husain Batalvi memorial.

In 1962, Qadir served as the chairman of the constitutional committee which eventually formulated the 1962 Constitution of Pakistan 1962 which introduced a Presidential form of government.

== View of tolerance and respect ==
Qadir was a role-model to and a friend of Khushwant Singh - a famous journalist and editor in India. Both friends shared a common worldview of tolerance and mutual respect. In February 2015, this view was endorsed by a panel of guests on a TV show including late Khushwant Singh's son Rahul Singh, Pakistani Senator Aitezaz Ahsan, an Indian writer Shobha De and the son of Manzur Qadir - Basharat Qadir. Basharat Qadir related how Khushwant Singh handed over the keys of his house in Lahore to Manzur Qadir at the time of Partition of British India in 1947 before he left for India.

Political offices
Preceded by Feroz Khan Noon	Minister of Foreign Affairs; 1958–1962	Succeeded by Muhammad Ali Bogra
