= Muhammad Afzal Husain =

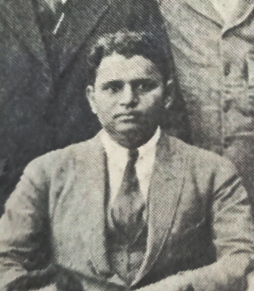
M. Afzal Husain in 1923 at Pusa

Muhammad Afzal Husain (10 June 1889 – 1 November 1970) was a British Indian and later Pakistani entomologist who served briefly as an officiating Imperial Entomologist and is considered father of entomology in Pakistan. He was Vice Chancellor of the Punjab University from 1938 to 1960. He was conferred the title Khan Bahadur.

Husain was born in a prosperous family from Batala, Gurdaspur District. His father, Husain Baksh, was a Persian and Arabic scholar who worked as a district judge. Husain was a younger half-brother of Sir Fazal-i-Hussain, KCIE. During his early years he moved around Punjab and studied at schools in cities where his father was posted on transfers. He went to the Government College, Lahore with an Alfred Patiala Research Scholarship (1911-1913) before going to Christ's College, Cambridge for postgraduate studies. He was a Foundation Scholar in 1914, a Bachelor Scholar in 1916, and won the Frank Smart Prize in Zoology for 1916 and the Charles Darwin Prize in 1917. He was especially influenced by J Stanley Gardiner. He was selected as a supernumerary entomologist at the Imperial Agricultural Research Institute in Pusa in 1918. In 1918 he became entomologist to the Government of Punjab at the Punjab Agricultural College and Research Institute, Lyallpur. He worked there until 1930 with a break in 1925 serving as officiating Imperial Entomologist. From December 1930 he was involved in research on locusts. In 1933 he became a principal at the Punjab Agricultural College. In 1938 he became Vice Chancellor of the Punjab University at Lyallpur. At the Silver Jubilee session of the Indian Science Congress in 1938 at Calcutta, he gave a presidential address that examined the history of entomological research in India and its outlook.

He had four daughters and a son, Arshad Husain, who was an Ambassador of Pakistan in Moscow.

== Research publications ==
A full list of his publications is provided by his son Hussain in the INSA biography (1994). A selection of writings include:

- (1918) Comparative study of the mandibles of Crustacea (won the Charles Darwin Prize, Cambridge).
- (1920) Dextro-sinistral reversal, Proc. Indian Sci. Congr. Sect. Zoolo. 7 (3).
- (1920) (With Imms, AD) Field Experiments on Chemotropism in insects. Ann. Appl Biol 6, 269–292.
- (1920) The Lacinia-mobilis in Crustacea. Proc. Indian. Sci Congr. Sect Zoolo. 7 (3).
- (1921) Parthenogenesis in the Braconidae. Proc. Indian Sci. Congr. Sec. Zoolo. 8 (3).
- (1925) What steps can be taken to save crops from the depredation of Wild animals? Proc. Board of Agri. India.
- (1931) (With Bhalla, HR) Some bird enemies of desert locust. Indian J. Agri. Sci 1:609-619.
- (1936) Studies on desert locust [in several parts with other authors]. Indian J. Agri. Sci. 6:168-272, 263–267, 586–590, 591–592.
- (1949) A Food Plan for India and Pakistan. Pakistan Times Annual, 47–49.
- (1956) Higher Education. Punjab University, Lahore.
- (1959) The Master : An analysis based on Master's Examination, 1952. Punjab University, Lahore.
