= Fazl-i-Hussain =

Muslim Indian politician

Sir Fazli Hussain, KCSI (14 June 1877 – 9 July 1936) was a politician during the British Raj and a founding member of the Unionist Party of the Punjab.

== Early life and education ==
Husain was born in Peshawar to a Bhatti Rajput family of Punjabi origins hailing from Gurdaspur in 1877. His Rajput ancestors moved to Punjab from Bikaner and Jaisalmer in modern-day Rajasthan around the year 1500, having converted to Islam and entered the civil administration and the military forces of the Mughal Empire from Babur onward. His father Mian Husain Bakhsh was at the time serving as Extra Assistant Commissioner in Peshawar. At the age of sixteen he entered Government College, Lahore and graduated with a BA in 1897. In 1896, he married Muhammad Nisa, great-granddaughter of Ilahi Bakhsh, the renowned general of the Sikh Khalsa Army.

Fazl-i-Husain travelled to Britain in 1898 to further his education. He was admitted to Christ's College, Cambridge in 1899 and graduated with a BA in 1901. He had intended to enter the Indian Civil Service but was unsuccessful in the exams. He studied Oriental languages and law at Cambridge and was called to the Bar at Gray's Inn in 1901. Husain was elected President of the Cambridge Majlis in January 1901 and assisted in writing a telegram of condolence to Edward VII upon the death of Queen Victoria Husain returned to the Punjab in 1901 and set up a law practice in Sialkot. In 1905 he began practising at the Punjab High Court in Lahore until 1920.

== Political career ==
Husain joined the Indian National Congress in 1905 and in 1916 he was elected election to the Punjab Legislative Council in the seat reserved for the University of the Punjab. He immediately regarded Punjab as being in a state of political apathy and sought to engage Punjabis with the affairs of the government and align the interests of the Punjabi electorate with that of the wider Congress agenda. He left the Congress party in 1920 over their support for the Non-cooperation movement. He felt that non-cooperation threatened schools and colleges, and noting the backwardness of educational progress in Punjab, he initially sought to have them excluded from the movement before becoming convinced that Mahatma Gandhi's scheme of setting up national schools and colleges was impracticable and reckless.

Following the Montagu–Chelmsford Reforms he was re-elected to the Punjab Legislative Council in 1920 representing a Muslim landowner seat. At the outset of the first Council in 1921, having risen to become one of the pre-eminent politicians in the province, he was one of two ministers appointed by the Governor of Punjab, the other being Lala Harikishan Lal, and served as the minister for education, health, and local government. During this time he spearheaded a rural bloc of Muslims, Hindus and Sikhs, which in 1923 formally organised itself into the Unionist Party and intended to be a mass organization of Punjab's peasant proprietors. Whilst the party succeeded in gaining support from only the rural Hindu and Sikhs, it also successfully attracted the support of the bulk of urban Muslims. In 1923, Husain extended separate electorates to local bodies and educational institutions seeking to raise Muslim representation to the level of the Muslim proportion of the population, which in turn created tensions between Muslim and Hindu. In his role as education minister he is credited with having been the main engineer of the scheme to establish employment quotas for Muslims in the Indian civil service. In January 1924, he was re-elected to the Council and remained as a minister until January 1926 when he left the Punjab Assembly upon being appointed Revenue Member. Chhotu Ram, a Hindu Jat, was named as his successor as president of the Unionist party He was made a Knight Commander of the Order of the Indian Empire in 1926.

In 1930, he was promoted to the Viceroy's Executive Council in Delhi where he remained until 1935. He became the most important councilor of the Viceroy and used his position to challenge Muhammad Ali Jinnah's claims that he alone represented the interests of the Muslims. He played an important part in organizing the Round Table Conferences and influencing the views of the present Muslim delegates. The Punjabi view of the "Muslim interest" formulated by Husain was a success. The implementation of the Communal Award and Government of India Act 1935, allowed the majority Muslims in Punjab and Bengal to retain their separate electorates yet also granted them more seats than any other community in their respective assemblies. Whilst this allowed Muslim politicians in Punjab to increase their autonomy it brought them into conflict with Muslims in Hindu majority provinces, who would now look to Jinnah and the Muslim League for support. In 1932, he led the Indian delegation to the Indo-South African Conference and was appointed a Knight Commander of the Order of the Star of India in 1932. On returning to Lahore from Delhi in 1935, Husain sought to prepare the Unionist Party for the forthcoming provincial elections. He made strides in reorganizing, financing, and allotting tickets for his party, and warned Jinnah against meddling with the inter-communal politics of the Punjab. In January 1936, Jinnah offered him the annual presidency of the Muslim League, however before waiting for his response, accepted the position himself and became its President in 1936.

== Death ==
He fell ill on 1 July 1936, and died at Lahore nine days later. He was buried at the family graveyard in Batala.

== Family ==
One of his daughters, Asghari, married Manzur Qadir. This was her second marriage. She was initially married to a Hoti nawab Mardan. She gave birth to a daughter from the first marriage and after the death of the daughter she got divorced and afterwards married to Manzur Qadir. His paternal half-brother Mian Muhammad Afzal Husain served as the Vice Chancellor of the University of the Punjab, Lahore for two terms, one term before (1938–44) and one term after (1954–65) the partition of British India into Pakistan and India.
