= Harold Maxwell-Lefroy =

English entomologist (1877–1925)

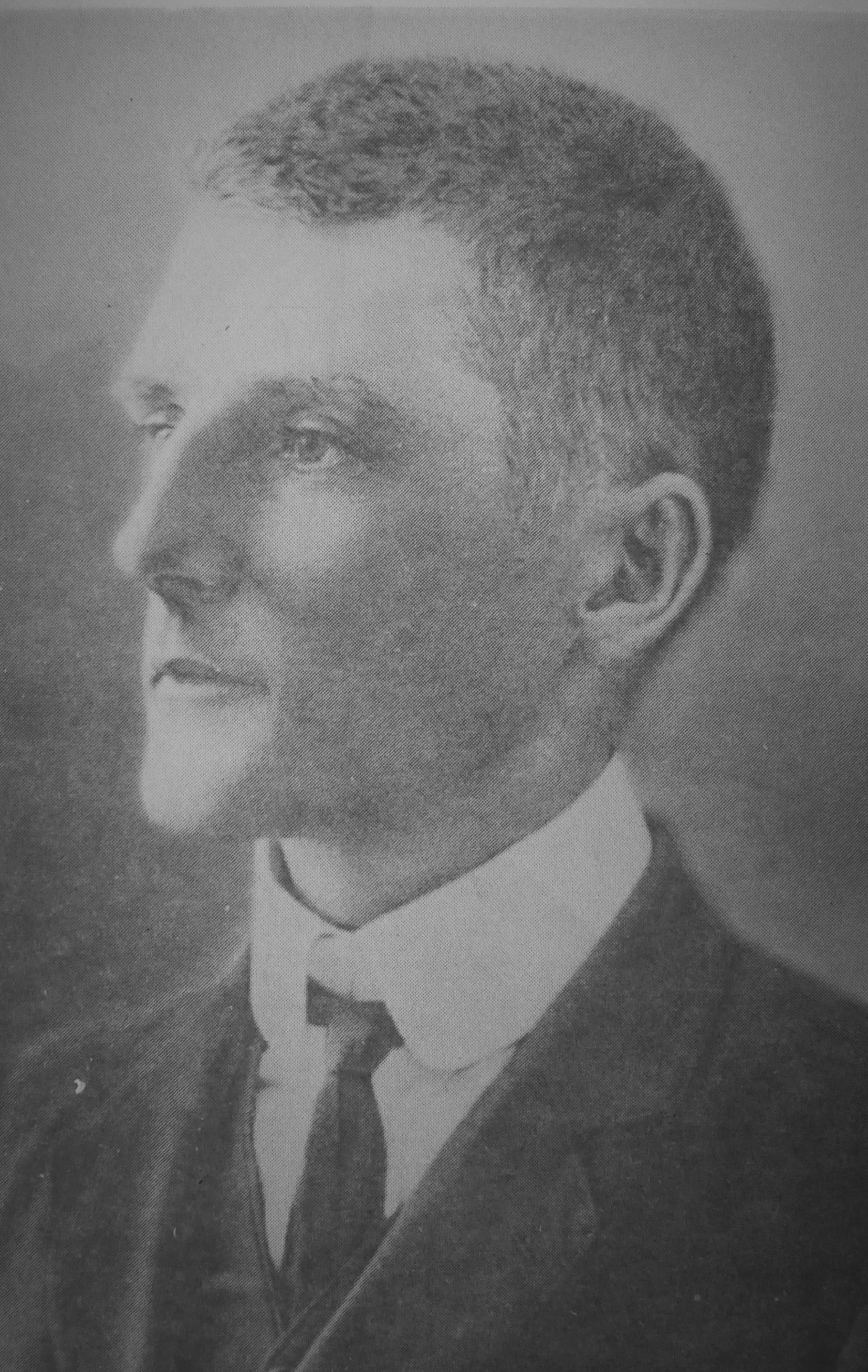
- Born: 20 January 1877; Crondall, Hampshire
- Died: 14 October 1925 (aged 48); St George's Hospital, Havering
- Cause of death: Poison

Harold Maxwell-Lefroy (20 January 1877 – 14 October 1925) was an English entomologist. He served as a professor of entomology at Imperial College London before moving to India where he took over the position of entomologist to the government of India from Lionel de Niceville. He was later made the first Imperial Entomologist to India. He worked in India for eight years, established entomological research at the Imperial Agricultural Research Institute in Pusa and left India after two of his children died from insect-borne diseases. He worked on applied entomology and initiated experiments on the use of chemicals to control insects. A formula he developed was utilized to save Westminster Hall from destruction by wood-boring beetles, while others were used to control lice in the trenches during the First World War. The success of his chemicals led to increased demand and the founding of Rentokil, a company for insecticide production. He was killed in an accident while experimenting with fumigants to control insects.

== Biography ==
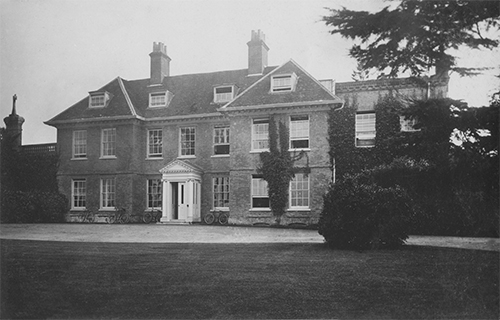
Itchel Manor, demolished in 1954

Maxwell-Lefroy was born in the village of Crondall, Hampshire, to Captain Charles James Maxwell Lefroy (1848–1908) of the 14th Hussars (whose grandfather was James Walker who had designed the Regent or Vauxhall Bridge in 1816) and Elizabeth Catherine, daughter of Alfred Henry McClintock, a Dublin surgeon (a brother of Leopold McClintock). The hyphenated form Maxwell-Lefroy was adopted by the family in 1875. He grew up in the family's Itchel Manor, on an ancient site which had once been property of the Bishop of Winchester. The manor is mentioned in the Domesday Book, and was filled with stories of ghosts and their hauntings (and demolished in 1954). As a child he was raised in an environment of opulence, with many servants at home to take care of the house and his needs.

=== Education ===
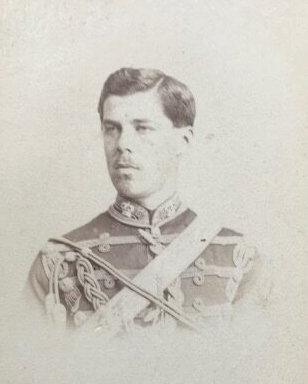
Captain Charles James Maxwell Lefroy

Harold was sent to school in Church Hill House in Crondall where one of his contemporaries, although a boarder unlike Maxwell-Lefroy, was Claude Grahame-White. He was later sent to study in Germany, and after returning to England in 1890 he was sent to Marlborough College where he was in Preshute House under master W.E. Mullins. Oddly he did not join the Natural History Society at school, contemporary members of which included William Keble Martin, Arthur Hill, and Lawrence C.H. Young (who went to Bombay in 1901 to work in a local business and also contributed to studies of the lepidoptera in the Bombay Natural History Society collections and died young in 1907). He finished school in 1895 and joined King's College, Cambridge, receiving a BA in the natural science tripos with first class in 1898. His specialization in entomology was influenced by David Sharp. He received a master's degree in 1902.

=== West Indies ===
Maxwell-Lefroy briefly served as assistant master at Seaford College, and then joined as an entomologist in Barbados from 1899. Before he left Barbados he got engaged to Kathleen Hamilton O'Meara, daughter of a former Provost Marshal in British Guiana from a Catholic family, leading to some disapproval from his mother and sister. His entomological work in this period was published in the form of several bulletins.

=== India ===
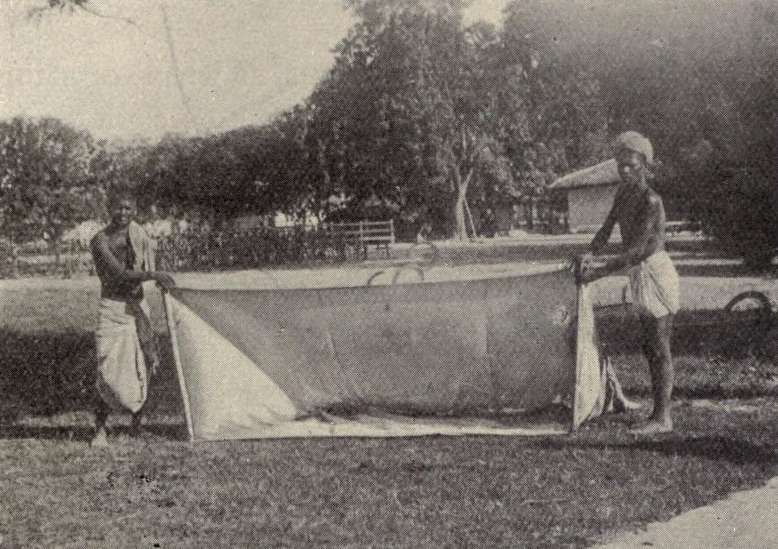
A drag bag to dislodge and collect caterpillars from fields, an innovation by Maxwell-Lefroy

In 1903, Maxwell-Lefroy was appointed entomologist to the Government of India (succeeding Lionel de Nicéville, who was the first government entomologist, appointed in 1901). The appointment may have been influenced by David Sharp. The salary in India was set at 750 rupees a month rising 50 a year to a maximum of 1000 a month. He sailed aboard the P&O steamer Borneo on 27 March and reached Bombay on 30 April 1903. He was then sent to Calcutta where he was to report to E.P. Stebbing. He married Kathleen on 22 January 1904 in a Catholic wedding at the Cathedral of the Holy Name, Bombay.

In 1904, Maxwell-Lefroy was assisted by K. P. Ukkendan Unni Nair, a zoologist trained at the Madras Christian College. Several Indian assistants worked with him including S.C. Misra from Nagpur who had worked at Rajkumar College, Charu Chandra Ghosh from Calcutta University who was in-charge of the Pusa insectary, Gobind Ram Dutt from Punjab and D. Nowroji from Madras University. In 1905 he was involved in the establishment of the Imperial Agricultural Research Institute in Pusa, in the Indian state of Bihar, and was appointed the first Imperial Entomologist. Purushottam G. Patel worked on blood-sucking insects initially under Maxwell-Lefroy and then under F.M. Howlett who was appointed the Second Imperial Entomologist (later called Imperial Pathological Entomologist, a position that was abolished in 1912). Although mainly involved in work on agricultural pests, he also took an interest in medical and veterinary entomology. He became a founding member of the Association of Applied Biologists founded at the University of Birmingham in 1904 by Walter Collinge along with 26 others who included Maxwell-Lefroy, Ronald Ross, Arthur Shipley, A. H. R. Buller, F. V. Theobald and Cecil Warburton. The founding editor of the journal of the society in 1914-15 was Maxwell-Lefroy but he resigned from the organization in 1920. In 1907 he oversaw studies to examine whether there was a possibility for Indian insects to spread sleeping sickness brought in by Indian workers returning from Africa.

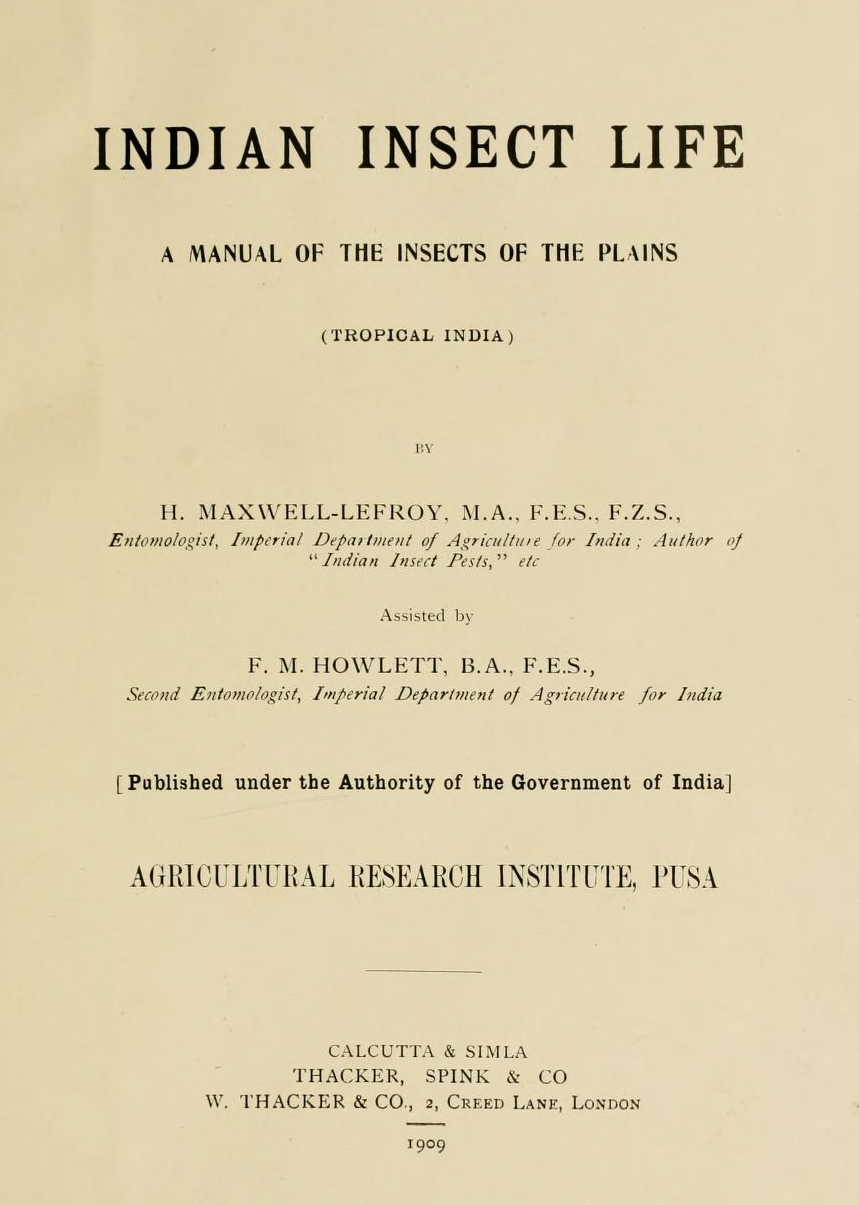
Title page of Indian Insect Life (1909)

In October 1908 he accepted permanent employment with the Government of India. Maxwell-Lefroy convened a series of meetings on an all-India basis, to bring together all the entomologists of the country. From 1915, five such meetings were held at the Imperial Agricultural Research Institute, and these formed the foundation of entomological knowledge in India. He was succeeded in the position of Imperial Entomologist by T. Bainbrigge Fletcher. Maxwell-Lefroy's approaches to agricultural pest management was principally aimed at being practical and low-cost, often advocating cultural practices such as the removal and burning of crops material that may harbour pupating pests. He published Indian Insect Life, a summary of the major insects of economic importance in 1906, in association with Frank Milburn Howlett. On 10 November 1910 their son Denis Charles died, possibly from typhoid, dysentery or some other fly-borne disease and the other son Cecil was immediately sent away to safety in Darjeeling to be taken care of at the Loreto Convent. The death led to his taking leave and returning to England the next year. His son Cecil was also accompanied by his Indian ayah Elizabeth. He took privilege leave from January 1911 for three months and then extended it by going on furlough. Among his last works in India was an analysis of the role of birds in agriculture, written along with supernumerary entomologist Charles W. Mason. The study, begun in 1907, involved analysis of the gut contents of 1325 specimens of birds shot in agricultural fields. He gave lectures in England and he was appointed a lecturer at the Imperial College on 1 September 1911. He applied for resignation from his Indian government posting. He returned to Pusa on 29 July 1912 and an offer was made to retain him but he decided instead to take up a position at the Imperial College as professor of entomology. His resignation was formally accepted on 15 December 1912.

=== England ===
At the Imperial College, Maxwell-Lefroy's focus was on applied and economic entomology. Maxwell-Lefroy moved to live initially in Strawberry Hill, and later Acton Lodge in Isleworth close to his workplace in South Kensington. In the early days, he used a motorbike with a sidecar to travel about. In 1913–1914, Lefroy was consulted by Frank Baines, Principal Architect of the Office of Works, to study ways of exterminating death watch beetles that had been found in Westminster Hall, beside England's Houses of Parliament. He began to try out various chemicals and finally came up with a 50% dichlorobenzene, 47% mineral oil and 3% barium oleate mixture to brush the wood with. This treatment was used by Baines who was then knighted for saving Westminster Hall. He also designed a field trap for turnip flea beetles (Phyllotreta consobrina) which disturbed the beetles and trapped them on sticky surfaces.

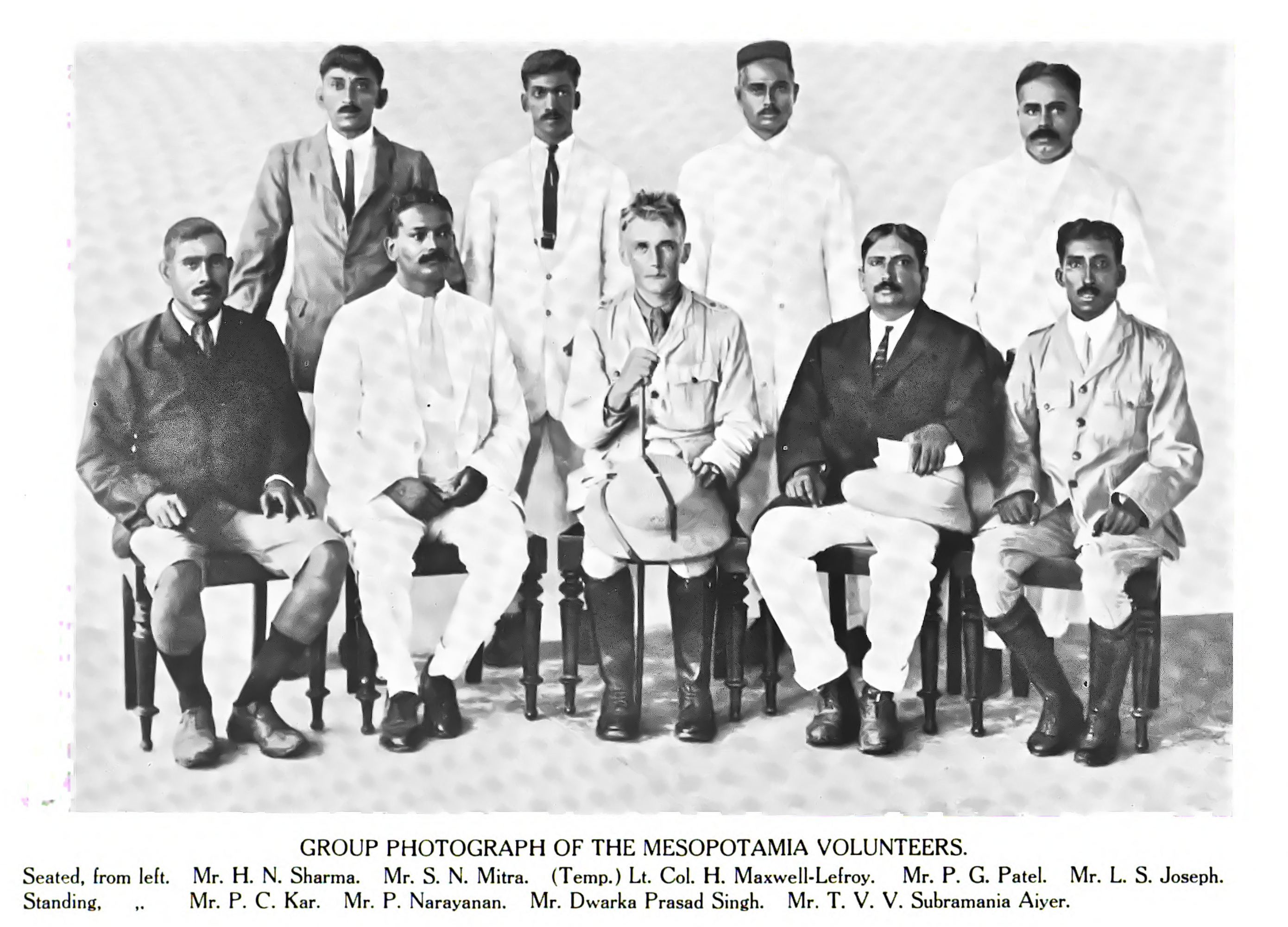
Lt. Col. Maxwell-Lefroy (seated centre) with volunteers from Pusa in 1916. The volunteers left to Mesopotamia to work under Beeson

During the First World War, Maxwell-Lefroy volunteered but was rejected on medical grounds from military service. In 1915 he took up a position travelling across India as Imperial silk specialist. Along with E.C. Ansorge, magistrate and collector in Bihar and Orissa; and an amateur entomologist, he wrote a Report on an Inquiry into the Silk Industry in India (1917) in three volumes but not without a major interruption. While in Bangalore on the silk study, on 17 April 1916, he received a telegram from the government seeking help on fly control in Mesopotamia. Appointed as an acting Lt-Col, he was sent to assist C.F.C. Beeson and shipped out from Bombay. He published on his investigations into the control of flies and other pests, a note in the Agricultural Journal of India included a photograph of his assistants from Pusa. He also introduced a treatment for the control of lice in the trenches called vermijelli that kept away jigger fleas and ticks. It was reported that there was a fall of 66% in cases of dysentery, cholera and typhoid after his measures were put in place. A bout of beri-beri invalided him and he returned to India, recovered and then travelled to England. Shortly after, there was a problem with weevils infesting wheat in Australia which hampered food supplies during the war. In October 1917 he sailed to San Francisco and then to Sydney where he examined the wheat weevil problem along with W.W. Froggatt, the Government entomologist and suggested various measures. He also examined the issue of sheep blowflies Lucilia sericata before setting off from Sydney to England in May 1919.

In 1924, Lefroy and his assistant Elizabeth Eades started producing bottles of woodworm treatment fluid from a small factory in Hatton Garden to manage a stream of requests, this led to the formation by them of a company called Rentokil Limited (now Rentokil Initial) in 1925. He registered the company on 29 September 1924, originally under the name of Entokill but this was objected to by the Board of Trade.

Maxwell-Lefroy's students included Evelyn Cheesman who took up a position at the insect house in the zoo from 1919. Maxwell-Lefroy had been appointed honorary curator for the insect house in 1913. Cheesman and Olive Lodge also attended his classes which otherwise included only male students. He encouraged their studies and when Cheesman set off for South Africa, he emphasized the need for anyone interested in insects to spend time in the tropics to fully appreciate the subject.

In 1922 he began to collaborate with Bruce Woolf who started a film company called New Era films to produce short documentaries on natural history. He helped in the production of several short films dealing with insects including one on wasps and another on tiger beetles in a series called Secrets of Nature.

=== Death ===
Lefroy once became unconscious in March 1925 while experimenting in his laboratory on poison gases to control houseflies. He was administered oxygen for an hour before he became conscious and returned to work in April. He again had a laboratory accident in October 1925. While some embellishment on the story followed in later years (including one claim that he was "found dead in his laboratory" and a surprisingly precise postmortem estimate of the hour and minute of his death), the facts reported at the time were that on October 10, a Saturday evening, "he was working in his 'secret room' in the Imperial College of Science and Technology at South Kensington when he was overcome with gas and pulled out just in time to save his life," and in a coma at St George's Hospital. Lefroy never regained consciousness after five days and he died in hospital on October 14.

He had been trying out various gases to kill the larvae of houseflies. His biographer, Laurence Fleming, suggests that his hatred for houseflies may have to do with the death of his son. He also notes that Maxwell-Lefroy may have been suffering from cancer and that there had been suggestions that his death could have been a suicide. His assistants, including Olive Lodge, had no knowledge of the composition of the poison gas. It is thought that he was experimenting with Lewisite. He was buried in Kensal Green cemetery. His position at the Imperial College was taken up by Balfour Browne who ensured that the flasks with unknown chemicals that Maxwell-Lefroy was working with were buried.

=== Family ===
Maxwell-Lefroy and Kathleen had three children of whom the first, Gladys Kathleen died in infancy, and the second, Charles died in November 1910 while he was in Pusa and was the cause of his premature exit from India. The only child who survived was Cecil Anthony (d. 1995) who became a general manager of Burmah Oil Company and was later made CBE. He wrote an unfinished biography of his father which was posthumously published in 2015, edited by Laurence Fleming. Kathleen died on 4 December 1967.

== Publications ==
Maxwell-Lefroy authored numerous journal articles and memoirs published by government departments. Some of the major books include:

- Indian Insect Pests (1906) - a Bengali edition was produced with assistance of C.C. Ghosh
- Trials of the South African Locust Fungus in India (1907)
- A preliminary account of the biting flies of India (1907)
- Locusts in India (1908)
- Maxwell-Lefroy, H. 1909. Indian Insect Life: a Manual of the Insects of the Plains (Tropical India) Thacker and Spink, Calcutta. xii + 786 pp.
- Maxwell-Lefroy, H. 1910. List of Names Used in India for Common Insects. Indian Agricultural Research Institute, Pusa, India. iv + 47 + xii pp.
- Measures for avoidance and extermination of flies, mosquitoes, lice and other vermin (1916)
- Silk Industry in India - Volume 1 (1917) with E.C. Ansorge - Volume 3
- Manual of Entomology 1923 with illustrations by L.N. Staniland
- Food of Birds in India (1911) with C.W. Mason

== See also ==
- Norman Hickin—another Rentokil entomologist

== Sources ==
- Fleming, Laurence (2015). The Entokil Man. The Life of Harold Maxwell-Lefroy. London: Dexter Haven Publishing Ltd. ISBN 978-1-903660-17-1.
