= Ewshot =

Village and parish in Hampshire, England

Coordinates: 51.238870°N 0.833080°W

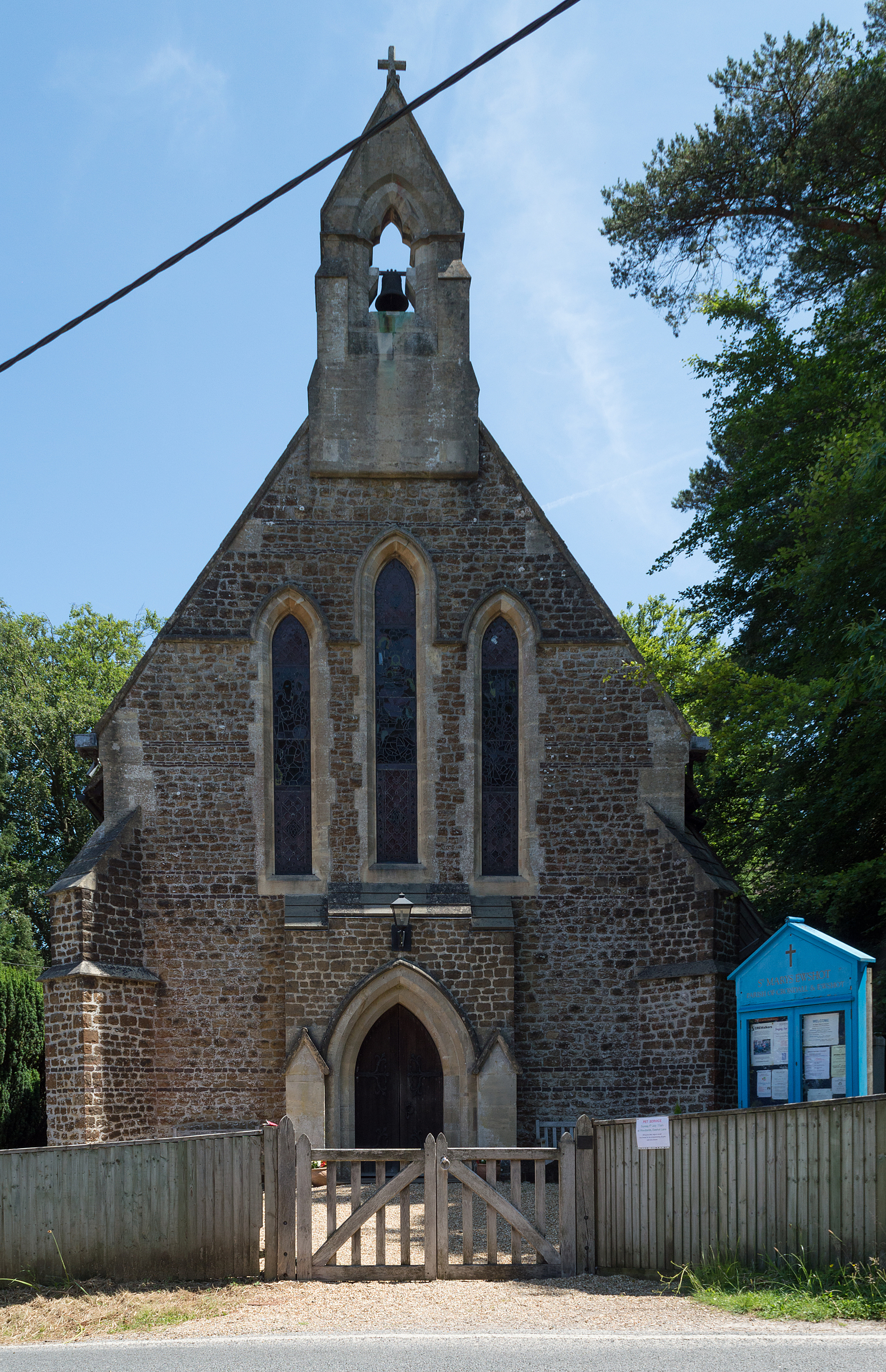
- St Mary's Church

- Location within Hampshire
- Population: 1,101 (2021 census)
- OS grid reference: SU8155949501
- District: Hart
- Shire county: Hampshire
- Region: South East
- Country: England
- Sovereign state: United Kingdom
- Post town: Farnham
- Postcode district: GU10
- Police: Hampshire and Isle of Wight
- Fire: Hampshire and Isle of Wight
- Ambulance: South Central
- UK Parliament: North East Hampshire

Ewshot is a village and civil parish in Hampshire, England. It lies in the north east of the county, close to the Surrey border. The nearest towns are Fleet and Farnham.

The name Ewshot comes from Old English and means 'corner or angle of land where yew trees grow'.

Ewshot consists of Ewshot village proper, a later development known as Ewshot Heights plus the outlying hamlets of Beacon Hill, Warren, Dora's Green and a newer estate of large houses originally called Marlborough Hill at the top of Beacon Hill towards Farnham. It has a small village hall, a residents association and one public house, called The Windmill. The parish church, St Mary's, was founded in 1873 and built in the Early English style.

The nearby Bricksbury Hill, a mile to the east, rises to 187 metres (614 ft) above sea level.

== Governance ==
At the lowest level of local government, Ewshot is a civil parish with a parish council of four members. The parish was created in 2010, when it was split from Crondall.

Ewshot falls under the auspices of Hart District Council for local issues, while Hampshire County Council administers the whole county.

Historically, Ewshot was in the Hundred of Crondall, which has origins dating back to the Domesday Book. It was in Hartley Wintney Rural District from 1894 until 1974, when it became part of the newly-created Hart district.

== Demographics ==
Census population of Ewshot parish
Census	Population	Female	Male	Households	Source
2011	635	339	296	232	
2021	1,101	604	497	414	
