= Harrow Way =

Ancient trackway in southern England

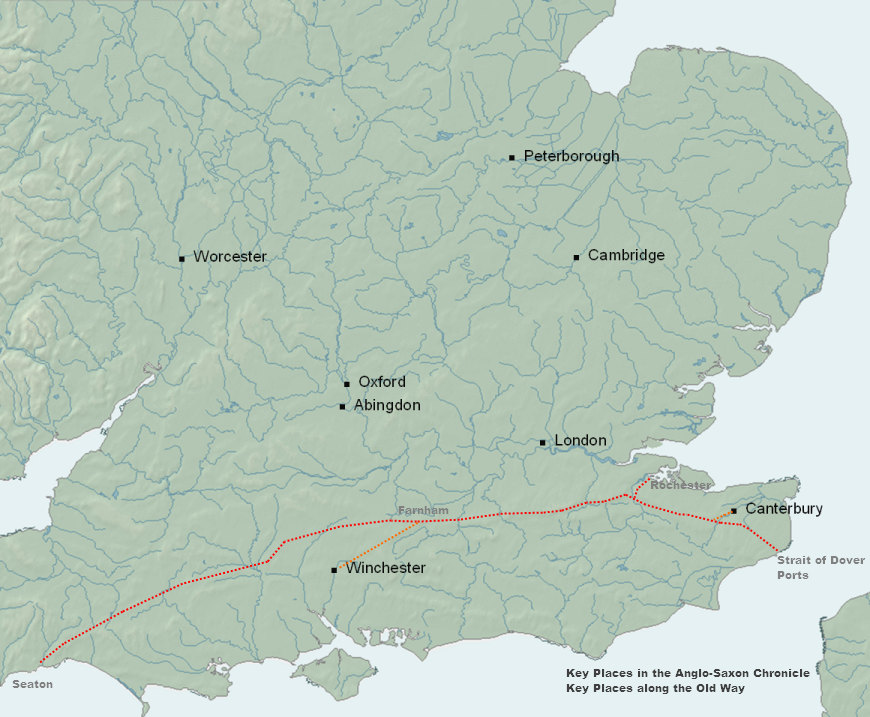
The Old Way marked in red with the Pilgrims Way marked in orange, key locations in the Anglo-Saxon Chronicle are labelled black

The Harrow Way (also spelled as "Harroway") is another name for the "Old Way", an ancient trackway in the south of England, dated by archaeological finds to 600–450 BC, but probably in existence since the Stone Age. The Old Way ran from Seaton in Devon to Dover, Kent. Later the eastern part of the Harrow Way become known as the Pilgrims' Way in the 19th century: the latter was a route invented by Albert Way of the Ordnance Survey, who imagined it (without evidence) to have been a pilgrimage route which ran from Winchester, Hampshire, via Farnham, Surrey, to Canterbury Kent. The western section of the Harrow Way ends in Farnham, the eastern in Dover.

== Origin ==
The name may derive from herewag, a military road, or har, ancient (as in hoary) way. It is sometimes described as the 'oldest road in Britain' and is possibly associated with ancient tin trading.

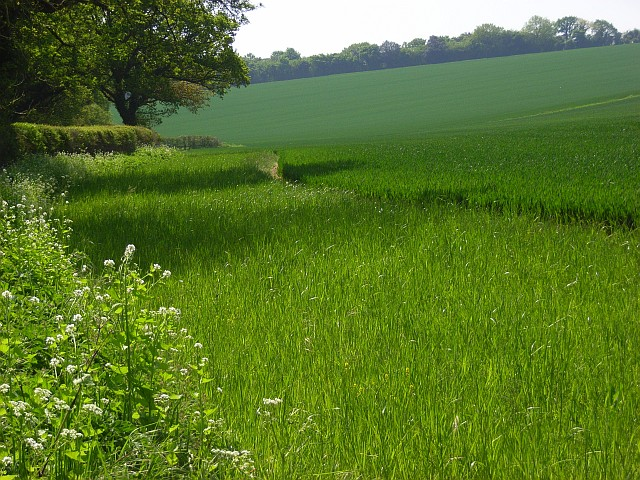
Looking up to woodland on the Harrow Way near Overton, Hampshire

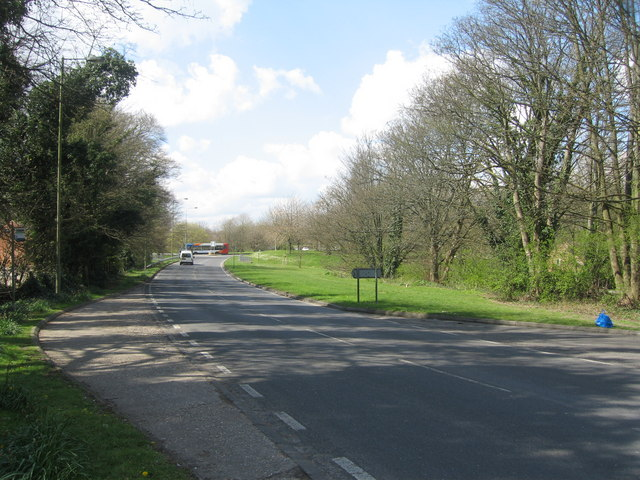
The Harrow Way - overlying road in Basingstoke

Alternatively, the name may have begun as a hearga weg, a pilgrimage road to a pagan temple (hearh). In Anglo-Saxon times there was a temple called on this path called Besingahearh, believed to be near present-day Basingstoke. Another possibility is Weyhill, a name meaning weoh "holy place," which stands at the intersection of Harroway and several other ancient paths. The hearga is unlikely to indicate Stonehenge; there is little evidence Stonehenge was used for ritual purposes by Anglo-Saxons.

== Description ==
=== The Eastern part of the Harrow Way ===
The eastern part of the Harrow Way (Old Way) from Farnham, Surrey, later known as the Pilgrims' Way, runs on or parallel to the North Downs Way National trail. The Harrow Way can be traced from Rochester and alternative Channel ports on the Straits of Dover. A principal track also starting in the valley of the Great Stour from Canterbury, to lead along the North Downs or its southern slopes, through Maidstone and Guildford to Farnham, Surrey. With its natural season-round well-drained soil, slightly more humus-rich than the crest itself, forming the most travelled of often several terraced routes.

The Pilgrims' Way diverts from the Harrow Way and continues from Farnham to Winchester. This pilgrimages route helped the growth of Winchester. Winchester, apart from being an ecclesiastical centre in its own right (the shrine of St Swithin), was an important regional focus and an aggregation point for travellers arriving through the seaports on the south coast. (See Early British Christianity).

Farnham, was a second aggregation point for travellers joining from the south coast. Gibson reports the section going eastward just north of Farnham ran through the area now Farnham Park and continued its course along the chalk outcrop, crossed the Bagshot Road where the Six Bells pub now stands and continued past Badshot Lea, Surrey where an important Neolithic Long Barrow burial mound (tumulus) was found. The Harrow Way then continues to the crest of the Hog's Back where the ancient trackway is known to have run. There are several barrows along the Hog's Back.

=== Western section ===
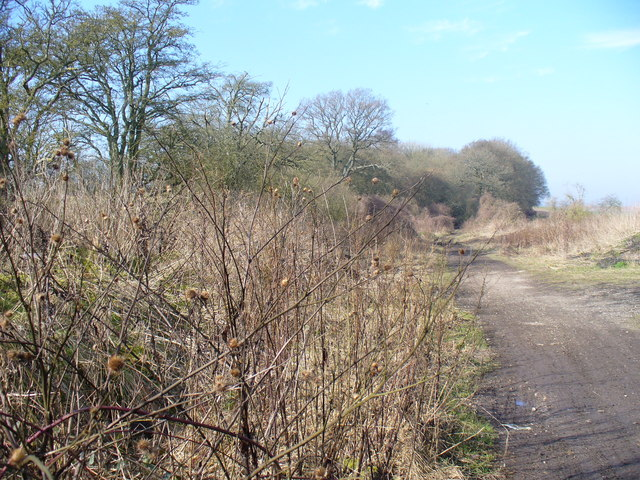
The Harrow Way - surviving track north east of Overton, Hampshire

The western part of the Old Way, the Harrow Way, can be traced from Farnham, Surrey west through Basingstoke and Andover to Salisbury Plain and Stonehenge, Wiltshire, through Dorset and on to Seaton on the Devon coast. In Dorset, the Harrow Way can be traced through the villages of Halstock and Corscombe, where it is known as Common Lane. At the Halstock end, a short length was realigned to form the access for a Roman villa (which was built on the site of a late Iron Age farmstead).
