= River Blackwater (River Test) =

River in Hampshire and Wiltshire, England

Blackwater
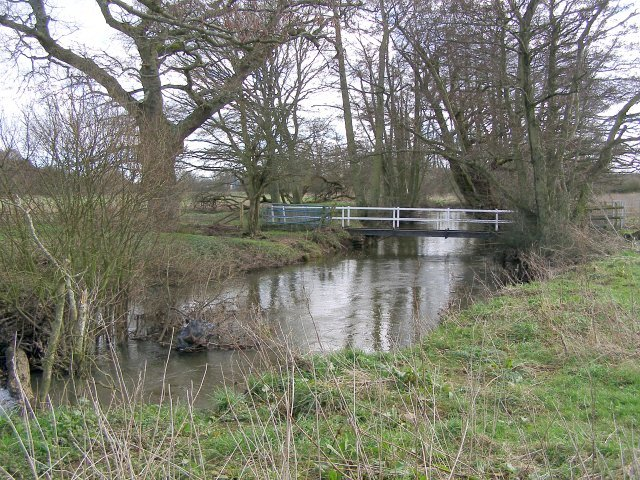
- River Blackwater east of Testwood Lakes

Location
- Country: United Kingdom
- Region: Wiltshire, Hampshire

Physical characteristics
- Source
  - location: Redlynch, Wiltshire
  - coordinates: 50°59′23″N 1°42′44″W
- Mouth: Totton
  - location: Hampshire
  - coordinates: 50°55′36″N 1°29′31″W
- Length: 45.0 km (28.0 mi)
- Basin size: 67.5 km^{2} (26.1 sq mi)

This River Blackwater drains small parts of the English counties of Hampshire and Wiltshire. It is a tributary of the River Test.

== Course ==
It rises just to the east of the Wiltshire village of Redlynch, east of Salisbury. It then flows east into Hampshire, where it flows north of the village of Wellow and the hamlet of Wigley. The river turns south, passing under the M27 and past Broadlands Lake and the Testwood Lakes reservoirs, before joining the Test between Totton and Redbridge. The Environment Agency records the length of the main river as 39.4 kilometres (24.5 mi), with an additional 5.6 km (3.5 mi) for the watercourse from Redlynch to the confluence north of Hamptworth.

== Water quality ==
The Environment Agency measures water quality of the river systems in England. Each is given an overall ecological status, which may be one of five levels: high, good, moderate, poor and bad. There are several components that are used to determine this, including biological status, which looks at the quantity and varieties of invertebrates, angiosperms and fish. Chemical status, which compares the concentrations of various chemicals against known safe concentrations, has only two categories: good or fail.

Water quality of the River Blackwater in 2019:

Section	Ecological Status	Chemical Status	Overall Status	Length	Catchment	Channel
Blackwater	Moderate	Fail	Moderate	5.616 km (3.490 mi)	12.068 km^{2} (4.659 sq mi)	
Blackwater (Test and Itchen)	Good	Fail	Moderate	39.362 km (24.458 mi)	67.526 km^{2} (26.072 sq mi)	

== See also ==
This River Blackwater should not be confused with the River Blackwater in north-east Hampshire, which is a tributary of the River Loddon and (indirectly) of the River Thames.

Another similarly named waterway in Hampshire is Black Water, a small stream which flows eastwards across the New Forest, passing under Rhinefield Ornamental Drive, before joining Ober Water and Highland Water just north of Brockenhurst to form the Lymington River.
