= Avon Valley =

Avon Valley may refer to:

- Avon Valley, Western Australia (disambiguation)
- The valley formed by the River Avon in Bristol
  - Avon Valley Railway, a heritage railway
  - Avon Valley Country Park
- The valley formed by the River Avon in Hampshire
  - Avon Valley Academy, a secondary school and sixth form in Durrington, Wiltshire
  - Avon Valley Path, a long-distance path
  - Avon Valley (Bickton to Christchurch), a nature reserve
- The valley formed by the River Avon in Warwickshire
  - Avon Valley School and Performing Arts College, in Rugby, Warwickshire
