= Milton Locks =

Nature reserve in Hampshire, England

Coordinates: 50.793°N 1.042°W

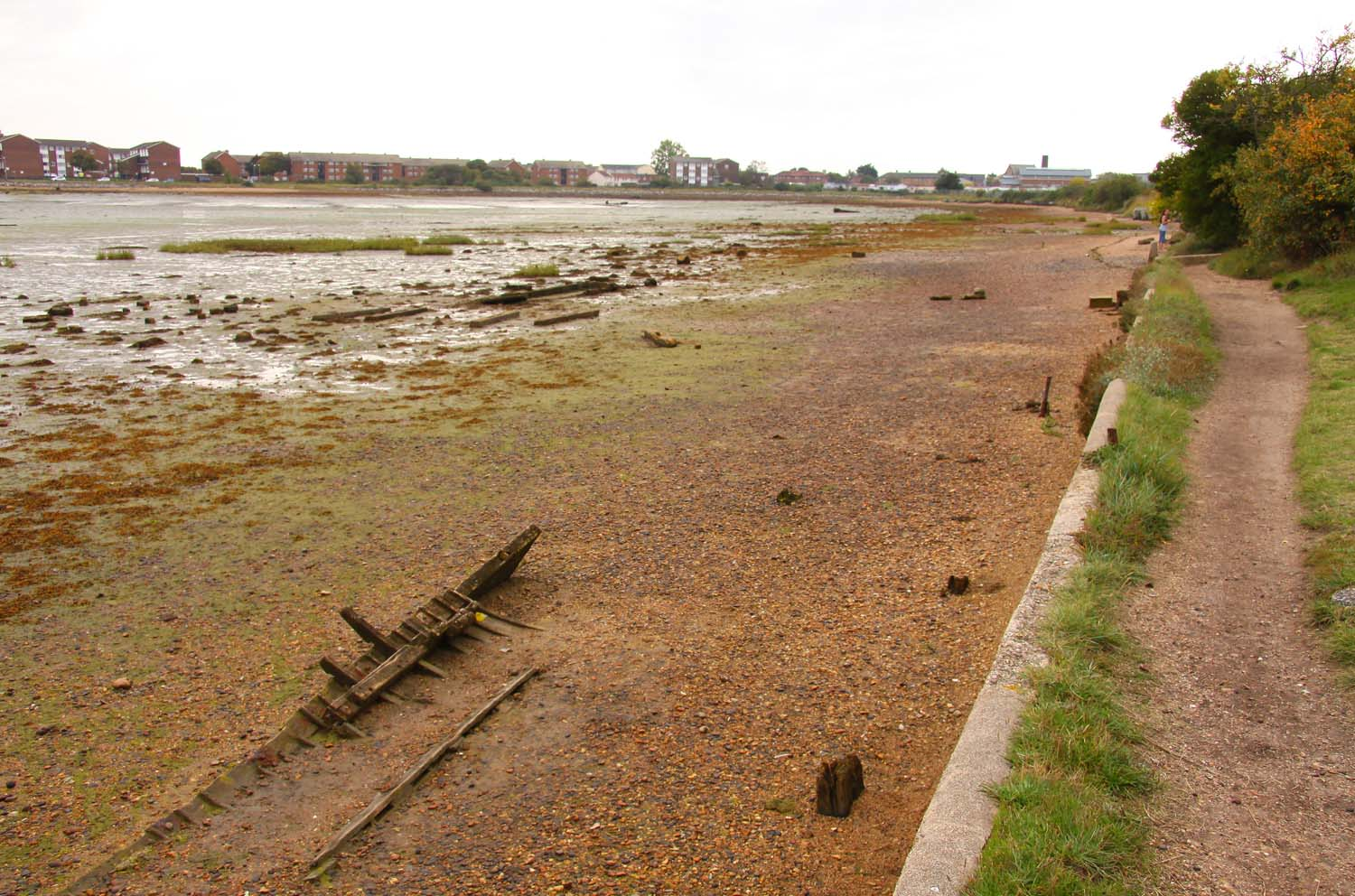
- Interactive map of Milton Locks
- Type: Nature reserve
- Location: Milton, Portsmouth, Hampshire
- OS grid: SZ 6765 9975
- Area: 1 hectare (2.5 acres)
- Manager: Hampshire and Isle of Wight Wildlife Trust

Milton Locks is a 1-hectare (2.5-acre) nature reserve in Milton in Hampshire. It is managed by the Hampshire and Isle of Wight Wildlife Trust.

This site on Portsea Island has grassland, a wood and a beach. There are saltmarsh plants such as sea purslane, sea aster and common saltmarsh-grass. The wood provides shelter for starlings and house sparrows.
