= Roydon Woods =

Protected area in Hampshire, England

Coordinates: 50.804°N 1.552°W

- Site of Special Scientific Interest
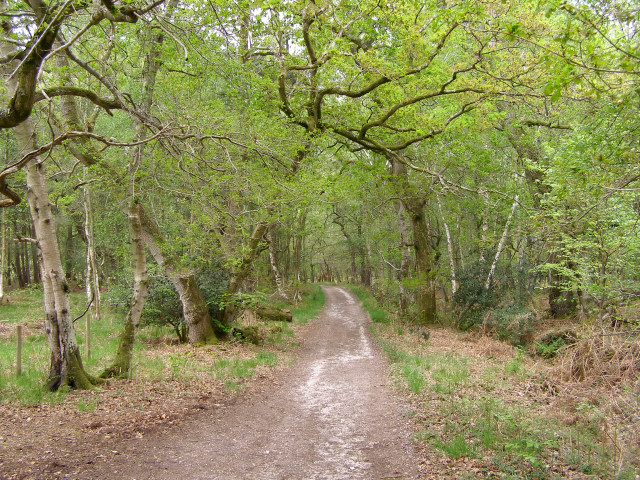
- Location of Roydon Woods.
- Area of search: Hampshire
- Grid reference: SU 317 006
- Interest: Biological
- Area: 294.9 hectares (729 acres)
- Notification date: 1985
- Location map: Magic Map

Roydon Woods is a 294.9-hectare (729-acre) biological Site of Special Scientific Interest near Brockenhurst in Hampshire. It is a nature reserve managed by the Hampshire and Isle of Wight Wildlife Trust and is part of New Forest Special Area of Conservation.

A large part of these woods are ancient, but other areas are former oak and hazel coppice planted in the nineteenth century. There are also areas of hornbeam and species-rich aldercarr. The SSSI also includes a stretch of the Lymington River and many open glades.
