= Warnborough Green SSSI =

Protected area in Hampshire, England

Coordinates: 51.263°N 0.957°W

Warnborough Green
- Site of Special Scientific Interest
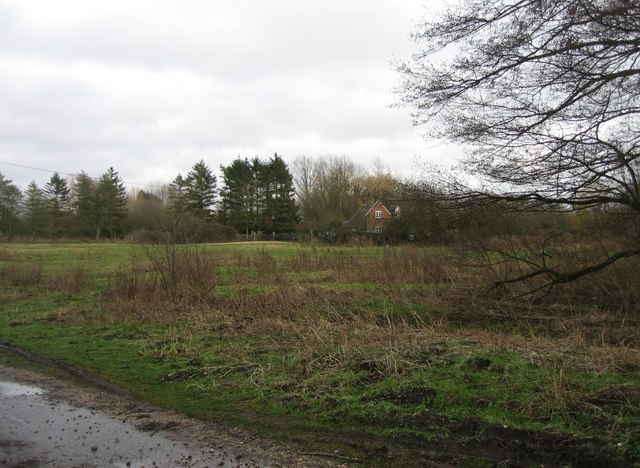
- Location of Warnborough Green.
- Area of search: Hampshire
- Grid reference: SU 729 520
- Interest: Biological
- Area: 4.4 hectares (11 acres)
- Notification date: 1992
- Location map: Magic Map

Warnborough Green is a 4.4-hectare (11-acre) biological Site of Special Scientific Interest in North Warnborough in Hampshire. It is owned and managed by the Hampshire and Isle of Wight Wildlife Trust.

This site consists of two species-rich wet meadows on either side of the River Whitewater. There are thirteen species of sedge, such as distant, flea and brown sedge. Invertebrates include two nationally rare flies, the soldier fly Stratiomys potamida and the hoverfly Xylota abiens.
