= Boldre Foreshore =

Nature reserve in Lymington, Hampshire, England

Coordinates: 50.752°N 1.497°W

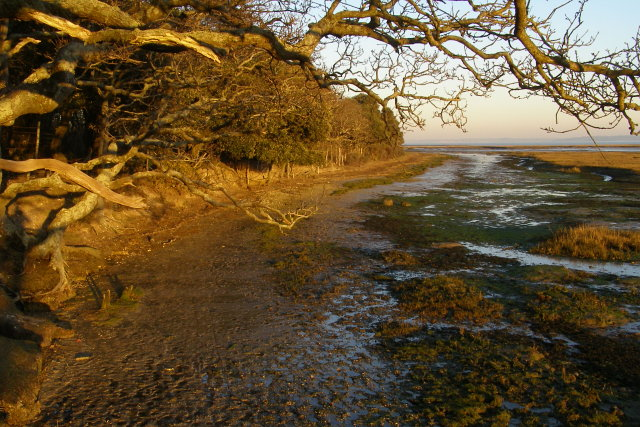
- Interactive map of Boldre Foreshore
- Type: Local Nature Reserve
- Location: Lymington, Hampshire
- OS grid: SZ 356 948
- Area: 193.3 hectares (478 acres)
- Manager: Hampshire and Isle of Wight Wildlife Trust

Boldre Foreshore is a 193.3-hectare (478-acre) Local Nature Reserve east of Lymington in Hampshire. It is owned by New Forest District Council and managed by the Hampshire and Isle of Wight Wildlife Trust. It is part of Solent and Southampton Water Ramsar site and Special Protection Area, Solent Maritime Special Area of Conservation, Hurst Castle and Lymington River Estuary Site of Special Scientific Interest and Lymington and Keyhaven Marshes, a nature reserve managed by the Hampshire and Isle of Wight Wildlife Trust.

This large site has a variety of habitats, including saltmarsh, shingle, grassland, fresh and brackish pools and mudflats. It has breeding populations of gulls, terns and waders, together with many wintering waders and wildfowl.
