= Hook Common and Bartley Heath =

Protected area in Hampshire, England

Coordinates: 51.274°N 0.965°W

- Site of Special Scientific Interest
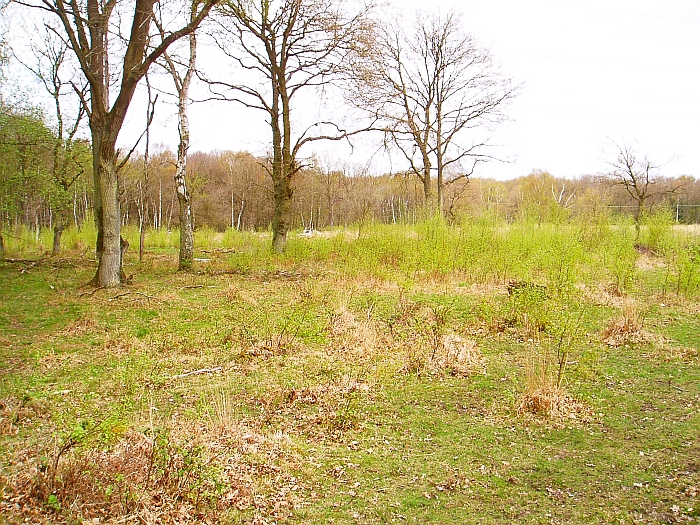
- Hook Common
- Location of Hook Common and Bartley Heath.
- Area of search: Hampshire
- Grid reference: SU 723 533
- Interest: Biological
- Area: 129.4 hectares (320 acres)
- Notification date: 1991
- Location map: Magic Map

Hook Common and Bartley Heath is a 129.4-hectare (320-acre) biological Site of Special Scientific Interest on the southern outskirts of Hook in Hampshire, England. It is managed by the Hampshire and Isle of Wight Wildlife Trust.

This site is of particular interest because of its extensive areas of wet heath, which rarely survives in the Thames Basin. There are also areas of dry heath and oak and birch woodland. There is a rich invertebrate assemblage, including the Red Data Book moths Stenoptila graphodactyla and Idaea dilutaria, and the hoverfly Microdon mutabilis.
