= Lymington River Reedbeds =

Nature reserve in Hampshire, England

Coordinates: 50.770°N 1.543°W

- Site of Special Scientific Interest
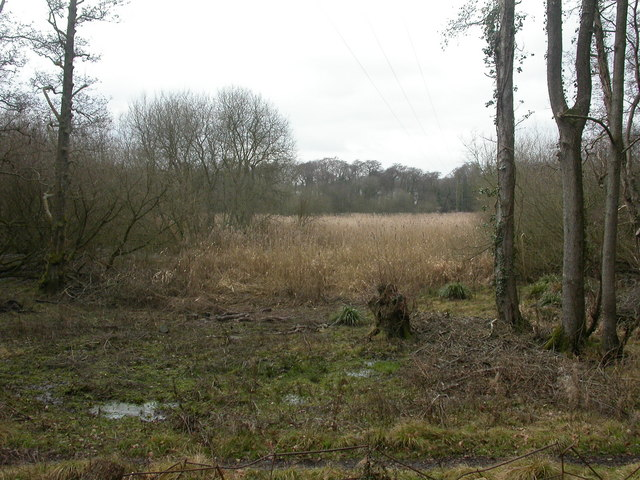
- Location of Lymington River Reedbeds.
- Area of search: Hampshire
- Grid reference: SZ 323 968
- Interest: Biological
- Area: 41.7 hectares (103 acres)
- Notification date: 1984
- Location map: Magic Map

Lymington River Reedbeds is a 41.7-hectare (103-acre) biological Site of Special Scientific Interest in Lymington in Hampshire. It is a nature reserve managed by the Hampshire and Isle of Wight Wildlife Trust. It is part of Solent and Southampton Water Ramsar site and Special Protection Area.

This site in the Lymington River estuary was formerly tidal, but salt water has been excluded since the nineteenth century by a one way tide flap. It has reedbeds and unimproved grassland which provide an important habitat for breeding and migrating birds. The reedbeds have large populations of aphids, which provide food for the birds.
