= Foxlease and Ancells Meadows =

UK Site of Special Scientific Interest

Coordinates: 51.302°N 0.811°W

- Site of Special Scientific Interest
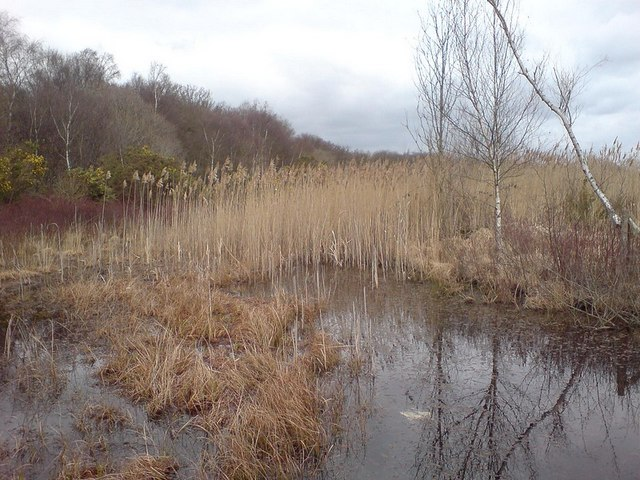
- Location of Foxlease and Ancells Meadows.
- Area of search: Hampshire
- Grid reference: SU 830 565
- Interest: Biological
- Area: 68.8 hectares (170 acres)
- Notification date: 1988
- Location map: Magic Map

Foxlease and Ancells Meadows is a 68.8-hectare (170-acre) biological Site of Special Scientific Interest on the western outskirts of Farnborough in Hampshire.The site is in seven areas, two of which are nature reserves managed by the Hampshire and Isle of Wight Wildlife Trust, Ancells Farm and Whitehouse Meadow.

This site is mainly composed of species-rich meadows, which are damp and acidic. There also many ponds and ditches which have a diverse flora, including water violet and the nationally declining marsh stitchwort. Over 240 species of plants have been recorded, including 17 sedges.

Part of the land within Foxlease and Ancells Meadows SSSI is owned by the Ministry of Defence.
