= Hampshire and Isle of Wight Wildlife Trust =

Wildlife and nature charity in the UK

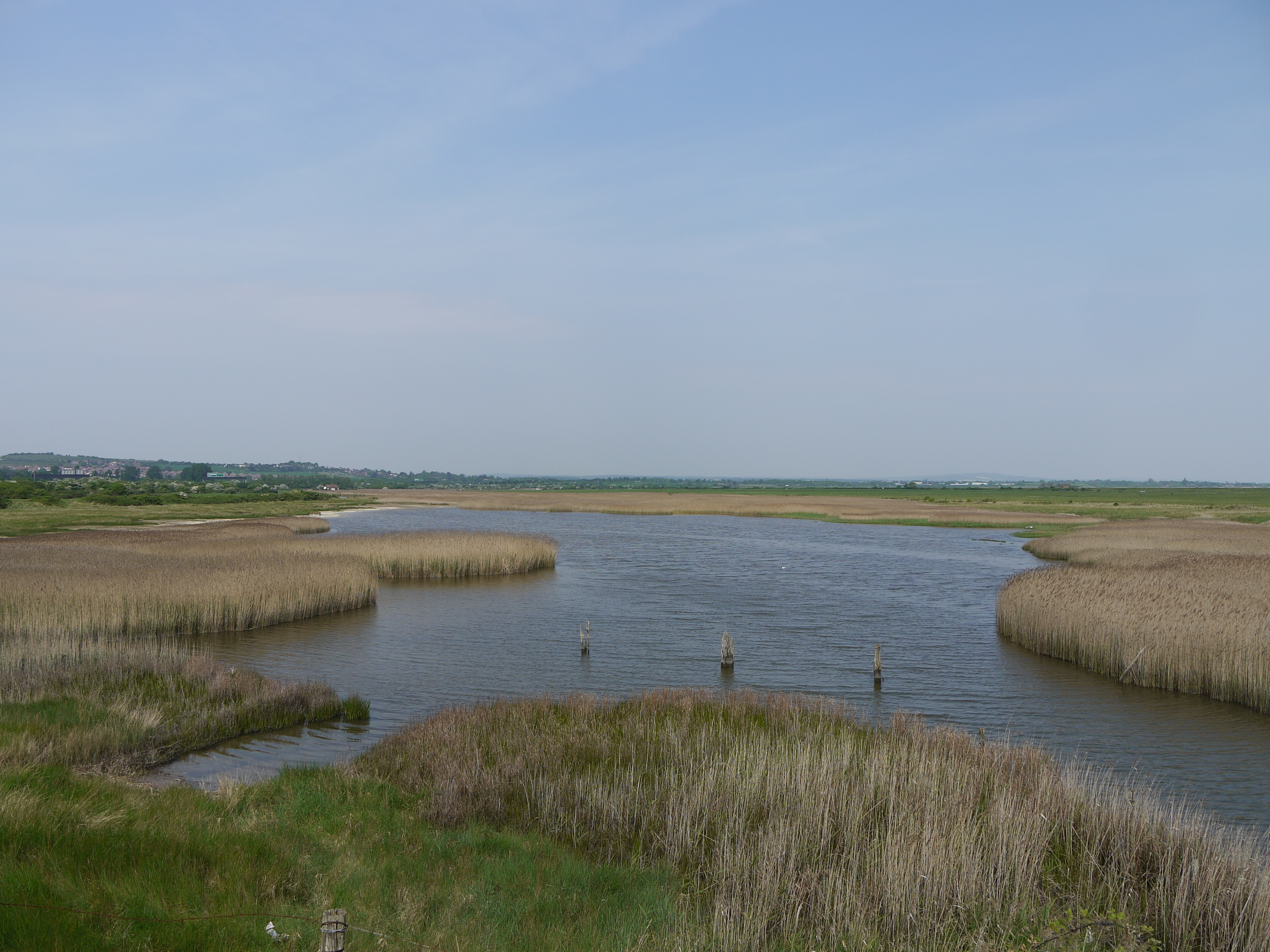
- Farlington Marshes
- Headquarters: Curdridge
- Location: Hampshire
- Members: 25,000
- Website: Hampshire and Isle of Wight Wildlife Trust website

Hampshire and Isle of Wight Wildlife Trust is a Wildlife Trust with 27,000 members across the counties of Hampshire and the Isle of Wight, England.

The trust describes itself as the leading local wildlife conservation charity in Hampshire and the Island with the stated aim of improving conditions for wildlife on land and at sea. The organisation also runs community engagement events helping local people find out about their local wild places.

== Nature reserves ==
The trust currently manages 46 wildlife reserves, including woodland, meadow, heathland, and coastal habitats. The Trust also runs four education centres at its Blashford Lakes, Testwood Lakes, Swanwick Lakes and Bouldnor Forest reserves, where education activities for young people and adults take place.

== Work with other organisations ==
The trust's projects include: advice to landowners on how to manage their land with wildlife in mind, including commoners in the New Forest; species reintroductions like working with the South Downs National Park Authority to reintroduce water voles to the River Meon; and working with local authorities to make public spaces more wildlife-friendly.

== Key ==
=== Public access ===
- FP = public access to footpaths through the site
- PL = public access at limited times
- PP = Public access to part of the site
- Yes = public access to the whole or most of the site

=== Other classifications ===
- GCR = Geological Conservation Review
- LNR = Local nature reserve
- NCR = Nature Conservation Review
- NNR = National nature reserve
- Ramsar = Ramsar site, an internationally important wetland site
- SAC = Special Area of Conservation
- SPA = Special Protection Area under the European Union Directive on the Conservation of Wild Birds
- SSSI = Site of Special Scientific Interest

Site	Photograph	Area (Note: The area and location are taken from the Wildlife Trust page for each site.)	Location	Public access	Other Classifications	Description
Ancells Farm	Ancells Farm	12 hectares (30 acres)	Fleet; 51.294°N 0.820°W; SU 824 557	YES	SSSI	This site has heathland and ponds with diverse fauna and flora. It has many flying insects, which provide food for bats. Flora include bog myrtle, Bog asphodel and several species of orchid.
Arreton Down	Arreton Down	19 hectares (47 acres)	Newport; 50.685°N 1.247°W; SZ 533875	YES	SSSI	
Barton Meadows		32 hectares (79 acres)	Winchester; 51.079°N 1.313°W; SU482313	FP		
Blashford Lakes	Blashford Lakes	159 hectares (390 acres)	Ringwood; 50.874°N 1.787°W; SU151083	YES	NCR, Ramsar, SAC, SPA, SSSI	These former gravel pits have lakes, woods and grassland. There are six bird hides and 8 kilometres (5.0 miles) of gravel paths. Birds include lesser redpolls, sand martins, goosanders, siskins and great spotted woodpeckers.
Bouldnor Forest	Bouldnor Forest	38 hectares (94 acres)	Yarmouth; 50.711°N 1.466°W; SZ378903	YES		
Broughton Down	Broughton Down	25 hectares (62 acres)	Ringwood; 51.095°N 1.584°W; SU 292 329	YES	SSSI	This sloping site on chalk has grassland which is grazed by rabbits and has many anthills. There are also areas of scrub and mature woodland. Insects include silver-spotted skipper, Duke of Burgundy fritillary and Essex skipper butterflies and chalk carpet moths.
Chappetts Copse	Chappetts Copse	12 hectares (30 acres)	West Meon; 51.006°N 1.071°W; SU 653 234	YES		This ancient ash and beech wood has many rare fungi and plants. Orchids include broad-leaved helleborine and bird's-nest, and there are butterflies such as the speckled wood and silver-washed fritillary.
Copythorne Common	Copythorne Common	17 hectares (42 acres)	Copythorne; 50.937°N 1.562°W; SU 309 154	YES	SAC, SSSI	The common has grassland, woods and dry heath. Birds include long-tailed tits and woodlarks, while there are reptiles such as slow worms, adders and woodlarks.
Coulters Dean	Coulters Dean	4 hectares (9.9 acres)	Buriton; 50.967°N 0.936°W; SU 748 192	YES	SSSI	This is chalk grassland on a west facing slope of the South Downs. It has a rich flora and invertebrate fauna, which has been recorded periodically since 1914. Flowering plants include horseshoe vetch, rampion, clustered bellflower and at least eleven species of orchid.
Eaglehead and Bloodstone Copses	Eaglehead and Bloodstone Copses	9 hectares (22 acres)	Brading; 50.686°N 1.178°W; SZ 582 877	YES	SSSI	
Emer Bog and Baddesley Common	Baddesley Common	50 hectares (120 acres)	North Baddesley; 50.995°N 1.448°W; SU 388 219	YES	SAC, SSSI	Most of this site is valley bog, together with damp grassland, heath and woods. The bog is not grazed and it has a rich flora and fauna, including many moths. Plants include reed, marsh cinquefoil and bog bean. There is also an area of acidic grassland with a rich flora.
Farlington Marshes	Farlington Marshes	123 hectares (300 acres)	Portsmouth; 50.836°N 1.029°W; SU 685 045	YES	LNR, NCR, Ramsar, SAC SPA SSSI	This area of flower-rich grazing marsh is internationally important for its bird population. Wintering wildfowl include dark bellied brent geese, wigeons, avocets, redshanks and dunlins. There are also spring and summer visitors such as Cetti's, reed and sedge warblers, skylarks and lapwings.
Flexford	Flexford	18 hectares (44 acres)	Chandler's Ford; 50.991°N 1.397°W; SU 424 215	YES		This reserve is in two areas separated by the Eastleigh–Romsey railway line. It has wet meadows and ancient woodland trees such as alder and ground flora such as ramsons. Birds include siskins and lesser redpolls.
Greywell Moors	Greywell Moors	13 hectares (32 acres)	Greywell; 51.254°N 0.970°W; SU 720 510	PP	SSSI	This site is calcareous fen. There is a large area of wet grassland, which is grazed by cattle, and a small area of carr woodland. Meadow flora include cowslip, dyer's greenweed and pepper-saxifrage.
Hockley Meadows	Hockley Meadows	9 hectares (22 acres)	Winchester; 51.026°N 1.323°W; SU476254	FP	SAC, SSSI	This site has water meadows, a stream, willow carr, reedbeds and grassland, which is maintained by cattle grazing. There are brown trout in the stream and flowering plants include southern marsh orchids, water avens and cuckoo flowers.
Hoe Road Meadow		3 hectares (7.4 acres)	Bishop's Waltham; 50.952°N 1.200°W; SU563173	YES		
Hook Common and Bartley Heath	Hook Common	123 hectares (300 acres)	Hook; 51.274°N 0.955°W; SU730533	YES	SSSI	This site is of particular interest because of its extensive areas of wet heath, which rarely survives in the Thames Basin. There are also areas of dry heath and oak and birch woodland. There is a rich invertebrate assemblage, including the Red Data Book moths Stenoptila graphodactyla and Idaea dilutaria, and the hoverfly Microdon mutabilis.
Hythe Spartina Marsh		10 hectares (25 acres)	Hythe; 50.863°N 1.386°W; SU 433 072	YES	Ramsar, SAC, SPA, SSSI	
Knighton Down	Knighton Down	15 hectares (37 acres)	Knighton; 50.683°N 1.190°W; SZ573874	YES		
Lower Test	Lower Test	160 hectares (400 acres)	Totton; 50.929°N 1.482°W; SU 365 145	PL	Ramsar, SAC, SPA, SSSI	The valley has extensive reed beds, tidally flooded creeks, unimproved grassland and scattered willow trees. More than 450 flowering plants have been recorded, including the nationally rare green-flowered helleborine. The reed beds have large populations of wetland breed birds.
Lymington and Keyhaven Marshes	Keyhaven Marshes	738 hectares (1,820 acres)	Lymington; 50.733°N 1.551°W; SZ318927	NO	GCR, LNR, NCR, Ramsar, SAC, SPA, SSSI	This coastal site has saltmarshes and intertidal muds. Birds of prey include peregrine falcons, marsh harriers and merlins, while black-headed gulls and sandwich terns feed on fish in the marshes. Yellow-horned poppies, sea campions and sea aster grow in the salty mud.
Lymington Reedbeds	Lymington Reedbeds	31 hectares (77 acres)	Lymington; 50.767°N 1.542°W; SZ 324 965	YES	Ramsar, SPA, SSSI	This site in the Lymington River estuary was formerly tidal, but salt water has been excluded since the nineteenth century by a one way tide flap. It has reedbeds and unimproved grassland which provide an important habitat for breeding and migrating birds. The reedbeds have large populations of aphids, which provide food for the birds.
Mapledurwell Fen and the Hatch		3 hectares (7.4 acres)	Old Basing; 51.266°N 1.030°W; SU 678 523	YES	SSSI	
Milton Locks	Milton Locks	1 hectare (2.5 acres)	Milton; 50.793°N 1.042°W; SZ 676 997	YES		This site on Portsea Island has grassland, a wood and a beach. There are saltmarsh plants such as sea purslane, sea aster and common saltmarsh-grass. The wood provides shelter for starlings and house sparrows.
Newchurch Moors		50 hectares (120 acres)	Newchurch; 50.667°N 1.202°W; SZ 565 856	YES		
Ningwood Common		11 hectares (27 acres)	Yarmouth; 50.707°N 1.442°W; SZ 395 898	YES	SSSI	
Noar Hill	Noar Hill	20 hectares (49 acres)	Alton; 51.082°N 0.942°W; SU 742 319	YES	NCR, SAC, SSSI	These former chalk quarries are now an area of grassland and woodland in an undulating landscape. Butterflies include brown hairstreaks, grizzled skippers, chalkhill blues, dingy skippers and small blues.
Pamber Forest and Upper Inhams	Pamber Forest	214 hectares (530 acres)	Tadley; 51.355°N 1.115°W; SU617621	YES	LNR, SSSI	Pamber Forest has hazel coppice dominated by oak standards. At the southern end are plants associated with ancient woodland, such as orpine, wood horsetail, lily of the valley, wild daffodil and the rare mountain fern. The woodland has over forty nationally rare or uncommon species.
Roydon Woods	Roydon Woods	386 hectares (950 acres)	Brockenhurst; 50.807°N 1.554°W; SU 315 009	FP	SAC, SSSI	A large part of these woods are ancient, but other areas are former oak and hazel coppice planted in the nineteenth century. There are also areas of hornbeam and species-rich aldercarr. The SSSI also includes a stretch of the Lymington River and many open glades.
Sandown Meadows	Sandown Meadows	17 hectares (42 acres)	Sandown; 50.663°N 1.167°W; SZ 590852	YES		
Shutts Copse	Shutts Copse	5 hectares (12 acres)	West Meon; 51.031°N 1.093°W; SU637261	YES		This small wood has a ground layer of wild flowers, such as primroses and bluebells. There is a healthy population of dormice and birds include coal tits, tawny owls and great spotted woodpeckers.
Southmoor	Southmoor	11 hectares (27 acres)	Havant; 50.841°N 0.994°W; SU709051	YES	NCR, Ramsar, SAC SPA SSSI	This reserve on the north coast of Langstone Harbour has grazing marshes and scrub. It is an important habitat for birds and skylarks breed here. Other birds include brent geese, greenfinches and goldfinches.
St Catherine's Hill	St Catherine's Hill	47 hectares (120 acres)	Winchester; 51.046°N 1.311°W; SU 484 276	YES	SM, SSSI	This hill is covered by chalk grassland scrub and surrounded by the ramparts of an Iron Age hillfort. It has a rich herb flora, including thyme, common rock-rose, carline thistle, felwort, fairy flax and frog orchid. Sheltered areas are rich in invertebrates.
St Clair's Meadow	St Clair's Meadow	16 hectares (40 acres)	Soberton; 50.937°N 1.133°W; SU610156	PP		The River Meon flows through this grassland site, and it has diverse wildlife. There are water voles and kingfishers along the river, and insects include beautiful demoiselle damselflies, golden-ringed dragonflies and many species of butterfly.
St Lawrence Field	St Lawrence Field	5 hectares (12 acres)	Ventnor; 50.588°N 1.244°W; SZ536768	YES	SSSI	
Swanwick Lakes	Swanwick Lakes	35 hectares (86 acres)	Swanwick; 50.886°N 1.281°W; SU 507 099	YES		Most of this site is woodland, and there are also meadows and lakes in former clay pits. The north-east meadow has many orchids and butterflies. There is also an educational facility for children to learn about the environment.
Testwood Lakes	Testwood Lakes	55 hectares (140 acres)	Totton; 50.938°N 1.508°W; SU 347 155	YES		The site has three lakes, wetlands, grassland and woods. Birds such as lapwings, oystercatchers, great crested grebe, great white egrets, wigeons, shovelers and sand martins can be observed from the two bird hides.
Warnborough Greens	[Warnborough Greens	11 hectares (27 acres)	Hook; 51.263°N 0.955°W; SU730521	YRS	SSSI	This site consists of two species-rich wet meadows on either side of the River Whitewater. There are thirteen species of sedge, such as distant, flea and brown sedge. Invertebrates include two nationally rare flies, the soldier fly Stratiomys potamida and the hoverfly Xylota abiens.
Whitehouse Meadow		1 hectare (2.5 acres)	Farnborough; 51.301°N 0.798°W; SU839565	YES	SSSI	
Winnall Moors	Winnall Moors	64 hectares (160 acres)	Winchester; 51.073°N 1.302°W; SU 490 306	YES		A chalk stream runs through this nature reserve, which also has woodland and a flower-rich meadow. There are mammals such as Daubenton's bats, water voles and roe deer, and brown trout in the stream.

== See also ==
- List of local nature reserves in Hampshire
- List of Sites of Special Scientific Interest in Hampshire

== Sources ==
- Ratcliffe, Derek, ed. (1977). A Nature Conservation Review. Vol. 2. Cambridge, UK: Cambridge University Press. ISBN 978-0-521-21403-2.
