= Lower Test Valley =

Site of Special Scientific Interest

Coordinates: 50.928°N 1.483°W

- Site of Special Scientific Interest
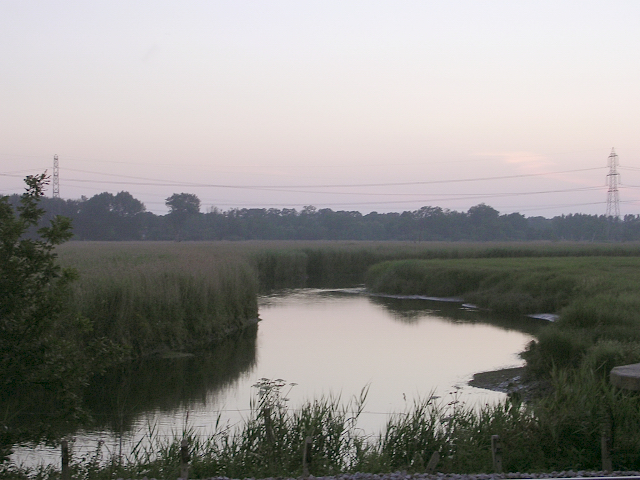
- Location of Lower Test Valley.
- Area of search: Hampshire
- Grid reference: SU 364 144
- Interest: Biological
- Area: 142.0 hectares (351 acres)
- Notification date: 1986
- Location map: Magic Map

Lower Test Valley is a 142-hectare (350-acre) biological Site of Special Scientific Interest near Totton in Hampshire. It is part of Solent and Southampton Water Ramsar site and Special Protection Area, and of Solent Maritime Special Area of Conservation. It is a nature reserve managed by the Hampshire and Isle of Wight Wildlife Trust.

The valley has extensive reed beds, tidally flooded creeks, unimproved grassland and scattered willow trees. More than 450 flowering plants have been recorded, including the nationally rare green-flowered helleborine. The reed beds have large populations of wetland breed birds.

There is no access to the reserve at high tide.
