= North Warnborough =

Village in Hampshire, England

Coordinates: 51.258416°N 0.951660°W

- Location within Hampshire
- OS grid reference: SU732515
  - London: 38 miles
- District: Hart
- Shire county: Hampshire
- Region: South East
- Country: England
- Sovereign state: United Kingdom
- Post town: HOOK
- Postcode district: RG29
- Dialling code: 01256
- Police: Hampshire and Isle of Wight
- Fire: Hampshire and Isle of Wight
- Ambulance: South Central
- UK Parliament: North East Hampshire

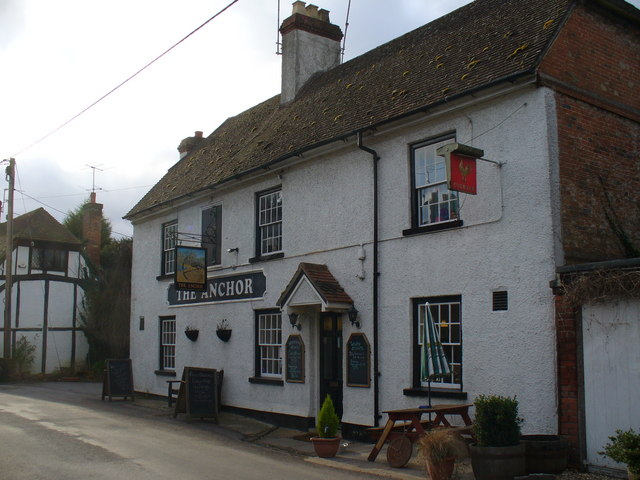
The village pub, The Anchor

North Warnborough is a village in the Hart district of Hampshire, England. It is in the civil parish of Odiham. It is located less than 2 miles (3.2 km) south of the town of Hook, on the opposite side of the M3 motorway, and just north-west of the village of Odiham. The Basingstoke Canal passes through the village, and the River Whitewater flows to the north.

== History ==
Held by King Harold before the Norman invasion of 1066, North Warnborough and Odiham had become a royal burgh by 1086. Half-way between Winchester and Windsor, the Saxon kings maintained a palace and lodgings in Odiham. By 1207 work had begun on Odiham Castle (known locally as King John's castle) in 20 acres (81,000 m^{2}) of meadowland between North Warnborough and Greywell, the ruins of which stand by the canal, itself Greywell Fen Site of Special Scientific Interest (SSSI) and a unique conservation area.

Part of house now known as Cruck cottage has timbers dated 1383/4.

The village once had two mills, with eight water mills recorded in the Odiham Hundred, as well as seven pubs.

== Description ==
North Warnborough consists of a conservation area, bounded by Mill Corner in the north and The Street in the south, lying to each side of the B3349 Reading to Alton road. The village's 40 listed buildings lie within the conservation area. There are also later housing developments with post-war housing beyond the southern boundary of the conservation area to the Odiham boundary and also in the Old Orchard. A detailed character appraisal was published by Hart District Council in 2009.

North Warnborough and Odiham are separated by several fields, including a bioethanol crop field, and a small protected woodland, a gap which is maintained by deliberate parish council policy.

North of the canal lies North Warnborough Green, another SSSI, including a ford.

The Lord Derby and The Anchor pubs remain. The Swan was destroyed by fire in September 2010. The Jolly Miller, following a brief period as a Thai-fusion restaurant "The Chili Pad", has been converted into housing. The Mill House is a family restaurant occupying a historic water mill.
