= Hurst Castle and Lymington River Estuary =

Protected area in Hampshire, England

Coordinates: 50.736°N 1.532°W

- Site of Special Scientific Interest
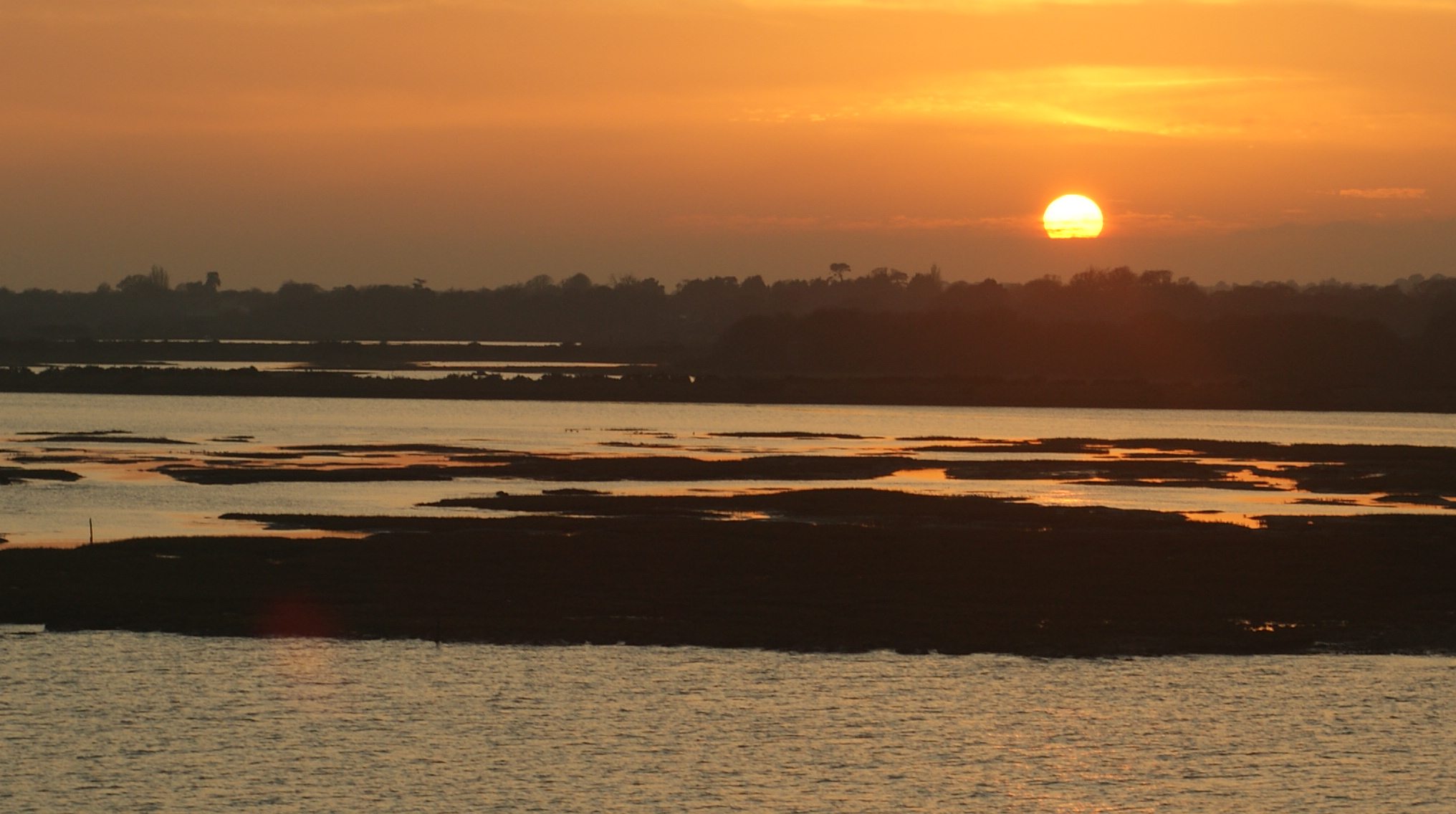
- Location of Hurst Castle and Lymington River Estuary.
- Area of search: Hampshire
- Grid reference: SZ 331 930
- Interest: Biological; Geological
- Area: 1,077.3 hectares (2,662 acres)
- Notification date: 1986
- Location map: Magic Map

Hurst Castle and Lymington River Estuary is a 1,077.3-hectare (2,662-acre) biological and geological Site of Special Scientific Interest near Lymington in Hampshire. It is a Nature Conservation Review site and two areas are Geological Conservation Review sites. Three areas are local nature reserves, Boldre Foreshore, Sturt Pond and Lymington and Keyhaven Marshes; the latter site is managed by the Hampshire and Isle of Wight Wildlife Trust. Part of it is North Solent National Nature Reserve. It is part of Solent and Southampton Water Ramsar site and Special Protection Area. Parts of it are in Solent Maritime and Solent and Isle of Wight Lagoons Special Areas of Conservation.

== Description ==
The SSSI covers nine kilometres (5.6 miles) along the north-western shore of The Solent, covering a wide variety of coastal habitats which have a restricted distribution on the south coast of England, these all having biological and geomorphological importance. On the seaward side of the seawall the SSSI encompasses three estuaries of substantial streams and their associated intertidal mudflats, marshes dominated by Spartina anglica as well as higher level saltmarsh. Inland of the sea wall there is a belt of freshwater and brackish water marsh which surround a number of lagoons, the water in these lagoon varies from brackish to fresh and they are the habitat for a number of species rare invertebrates and plants which are of international importance. A well developed shingle spit, called Hurst Spit, forms the south western boundary of the site. It is geologically important as the basis of a seminal paper explaining the relationship of beach alignment to the direction of dominant waves.

=== Invertebrates ===
The Hurst Castle And Lymington River Estuary SSSI is one of five sites in the United Kingdom where the starlet sea anemone Nematostella vectensis is found, this is listed by the IUCN as Vulnerable and outside of the United Kingdom is found only in a few sites in the eastern North America. It is also the only known site in Britain where the polychaete Armandia cirrhosa and the amphipod Gammarus insensibilis, both of which are at their most northerly known sites in the lagoons behind the seawall here.

=== Birds ===
The mudflats are used by a wide variety of birds to feed on. Flocks of brent geese, Eurasian wigeon and Northern pintail use the estuary in the winter while waders such as dunlin, black-tailed godwit and grey plover feed on the mud and roost in the marshes and shingle ridges. sandwich and little terns nest on the shingle ridges alongside black-headed gulls. Together with great cormorants these fish eating birds hunt their prey in the rich waters of the area. Birds of prey, such as Western marsh harriers, peregrine falcons, and merlins are attracted by flocks of wildfowl and waders.

== History ==
The marshes were originally used for salt production but this ceased in the 19th century and the land reverted to saltmarsh.

== See also ==
- Hurst Castle
- Hurst Point Lighthouse
- Hurst Spit
- Lymington River
