= Blashford Lakes =

Nature reserve in Hampshire, England

Coordinates: 50.874°N 1.787°W

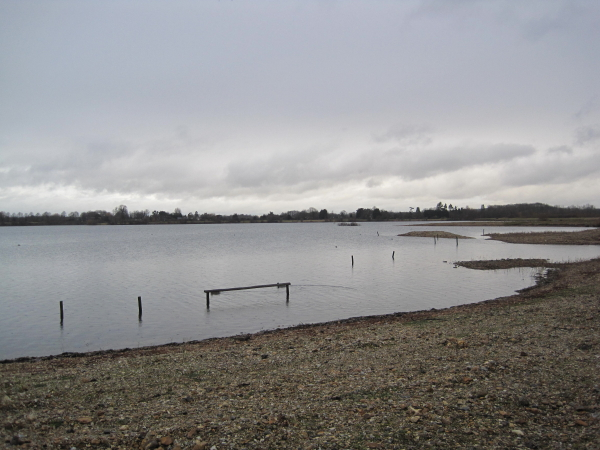
- Interactive map of Blashford Lakes
- Type: Nature reserve
- Location: Ringwood, Hampshire
- OS grid: SU151083
- Area: 159 hectares (390 acres)
- Manager: Hampshire and Isle of Wight Wildlife Trust

Blashford Lakes is a 159-hectare (390-acre) nature reserve north of Ringwood in Hampshire, England, which is managed by the Hampshire and Isle of Wight Wildlife Trust. The site is part of the River Avon System Nature Conservation Review site, Grade I, Avon Valley Ramsar site, River Avon Special Area of Conservation and Special Protection Area, and of Avon Valley (Bickton to Christchurch), which is a Site of Special Scientific Interest.

These former gravel pits have lakes, woods and grassland. There are six bird hides and 8 kilometres (5.0 miles) of gravel paths. Birds include lesser redpolls, sand martins, goosanders, siskins and great spotted woodpeckers.
