= Arreton Down =

Hill on the Isle of Wight, England

Coordinates: 50.68196°N 1.23703°W

- Site of Special Scientific Interest
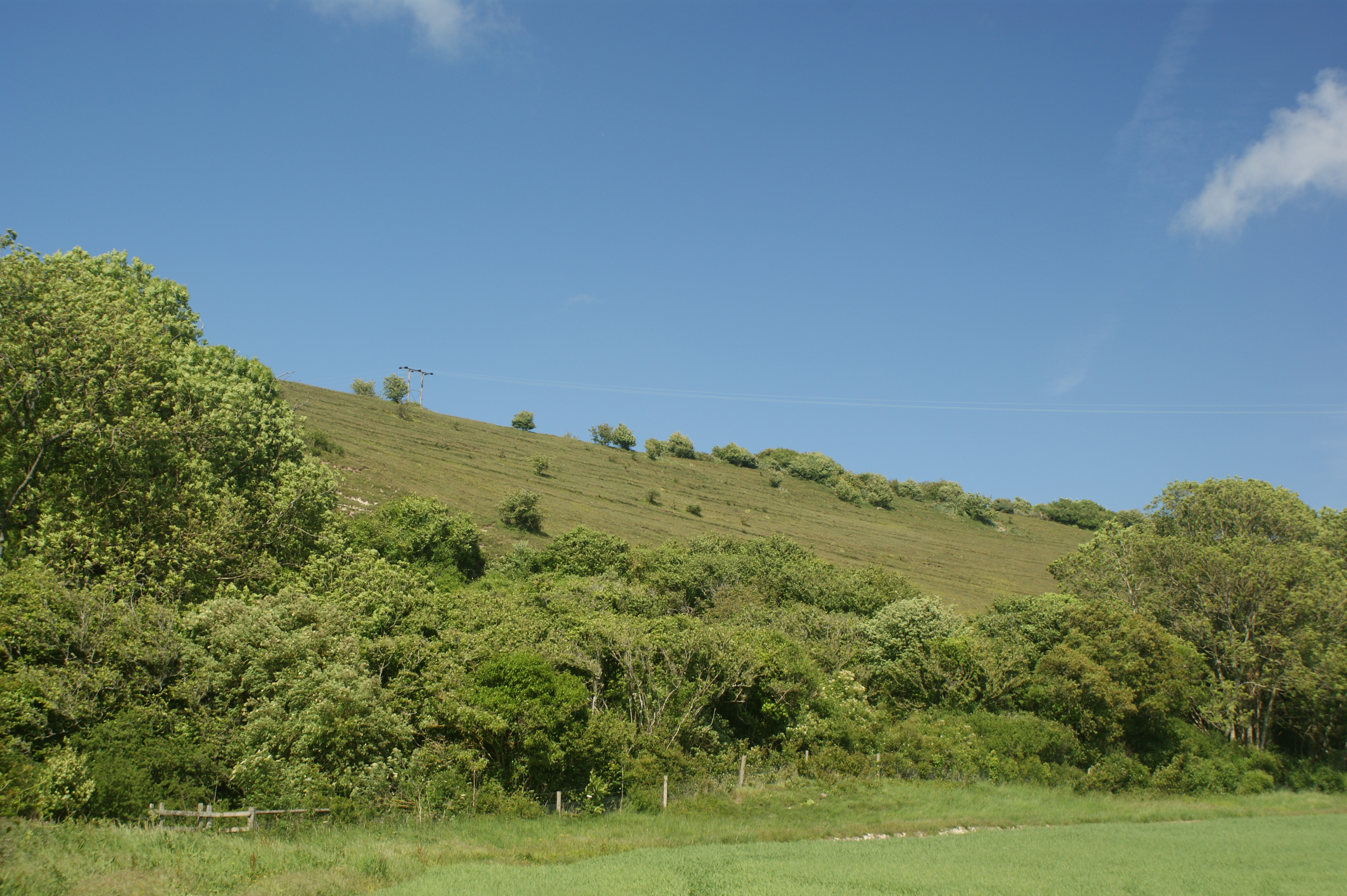
- Location of Arreton Down.
- Area of search: Isle of Wight
- Grid reference: SZ540872
- Interest: Biological
- Area: 29.8 hectares (74 acres)
- Notification date: 1979
- Location map: Natural England

Arreton Down is a chalk hill in the central part of the Isle of Wight in southern England. It is public access land, with 29.77 hectares (73.6 acres) designated as a biological Site of Special Scientific Interest (SSSI) and 19 hectares (47 acres) managed as a nature reserve by Hampshire and Isle of Wight Wildlife Trust. The land is marked by extensive ancient field features as yet unexcavated.

== Site of Special Scientific Interest ==
Arreton Down was originally notified as an SSSI in 1979 for its geological interest. It was renotified in 1987, but for its biological interest only.

The SSSI is a large area of south-sloping chalk grassland. It is grazed by cattle and horses during the winter, and is dominated by fine grasses such as red fescue and sheep's fescue. The flowering plants are typical of downland habitats and include horseshoe vetch, rock rose, wild thyme, carline thistle, pyramidal orchid, harebell, small scabious and the uncommon bastard toadflax.

There are large numbers of chalkhill blue butterflies on the site as well as small blue, common blue and brown argus butterflies. There are also great green bush crickets and three other species of bush cricket. Scrubland is another habitat on the site and this is where yellowhammers, goldfinches, whitethroat and linnets breed, as well as grey partridges nesting on the ground. ravens, kestrels and buzzards can be seen overhead while barn owls hunt here during the night.

== Arreton Down Hoard ==
An important Bronze Age hoard was found on Arreton Down in the eighteenth century. Comprising seven bronze spear-heads, four axes, one dagger and one halberd, it came into the possession of Sir Hans Sloane who bequeathed it to the British Museum in 1753.
