= Shutts Copse =

Nature reserve in Hampshire, England

Coordinates: 51.031°N 1.093°W

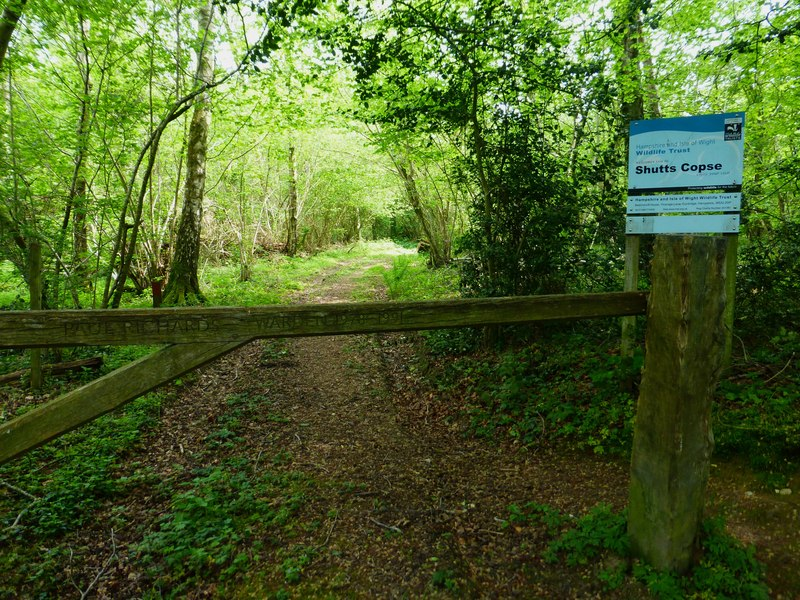
- Interactive map of Shutts Copse
- Type: Nature reserve
- Location: West Meon, Hampshire
- OS grid: SU637261
- Area: 5 hectares (12 acres)
- Manager: Hampshire and Isle of Wight Wildlife Trust

Shutts Copse is a 5-hectare (12-acre) nature reserve north of West Meon in Hampshire. It is managed by the Hampshire and Isle of Wight Wildlife Trust.

This small wood has a ground layer of wild flowers, such as primroses and bluebells. There is a healthy population of dormice and birds include coal tits, tawny owls and great spotted woodpeckers.
