= Broughton Down =

UK Site of Special Scientific Interest

Coordinates: 51.096°N 1.589°W

- Site of Special Scientific Interest
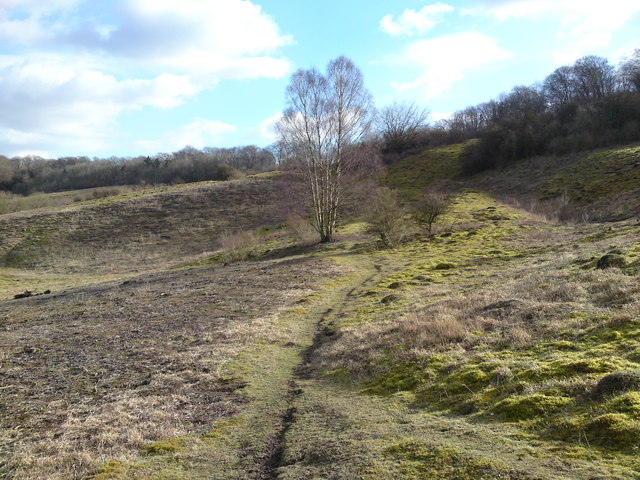
- Location of Broughton Down.
- Area of search: Hampshire
- Grid reference: SU 289 330
- Interest: Biological
- Area: 45.8 hectares (113 acres)
- Notification date: 1984
- Location map: Magic Map

Broughton Down is a 45.8-hectare (113-acre) biological Site of Special Scientific Interest west of Broughton in Hampshire. The eastern half is a nature reserve managed by the Hampshire and Isle of Wight Wildlife Trust.

This sloping site on chalk has grassland which is grazed by rabbits and has many anthills. There are also areas of scrub and mature woodland. Insects include silver-spotted skipper, Duke of Burgundy fritillary and Essex skipper butterflies and chalk carpet moths.
