= Sturt Pond =

Pond in Milford on Sea, Hampshire, England

Coordinates: 50.721°N 1.585°W

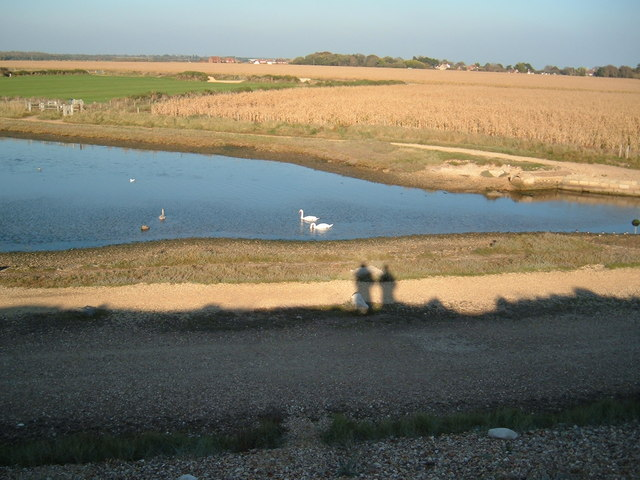
- Interactive map of Sturt Pond
- Type: Local Nature Reserve
- Location: Milford on Sea, Hampshire
- OS grid: SZ 294 913
- Area: 10.9 hectares (27 acres)
- Manager: Milford On Sea Parish Council

Sturt Pond is a 10.9-hectare (27-acre) Local Nature Reserve in Milford on Sea in Hampshire. It is owned and managed by Milford On Sea Parish Council. It is part of Solent and Southampton Water Ramsar site and Special Protection Area, of Solent Maritime Special Area of Conservation and of Hurst Castle and Lymington River Estuary, which is a Site of Special Scientific Interest.

Sturt Pond itself is tidal, and the reserve also includes Dane Stream, reedbeds, lagoons and saltmarsh. These habitats attract many birds, and there is also an area of grassland which is grazed by New Forest ponies.
