= Avon Valley (Bickton to Christchurch) =

UK Site of Special Scientific Interest

Coordinates: 50.883°N 1.794°W

- Site of Special Scientific Interest
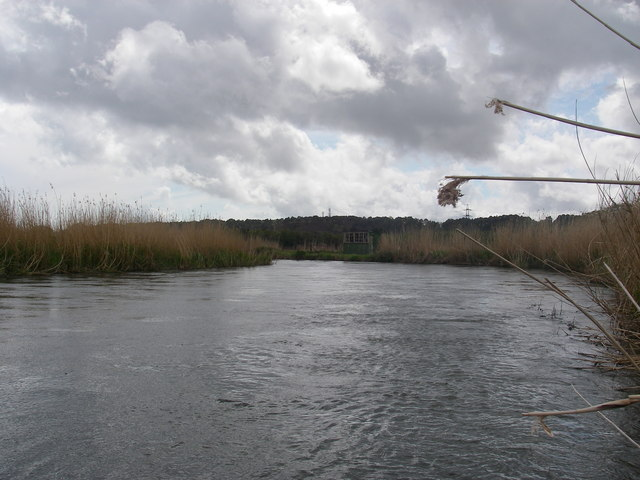
- Location of Avon Valley (Bickton to Christchurch).
- Area of search: Dorset; Hampshire
- Grid reference: SU 146 026
- Interest: Biological
- Area: 1,403.8 hectares (3,469 acres)
- Notification date: 1993
- Location map: Magic Map

Avon Valley (Bickton to Christchurch) is a 1,403.8-hectare (3,469-acre) biological Site of Special Scientific Interest which stretches from Christchurch in Dorset to Bickton, south of Fordingbridge Hampshire. It is a Nature Conservation Review site, a Ramsar site, a Special Area of Conservation and a Special Protection Area. An area of 159 hectares (390 acres) is Blashford Lakes, a nature reserve managed by the Hampshire and Isle of Wight Wildlife Trust,

This valley has more diverse habitats and a wider range of fauna and flora than any other chalk valley in the country. There are internationally important numbers of breeding and wintering birds, such as Bewick’s swans and gadwalls. The flora include a number of nationally rare species and the river has a diverse fish fauna. Dragonflies include the rare scarce chaser.
