= St Clair's Meadow =

Nature reserve in Hampshire, England

Coordinates: 50.937°N 1.133°W

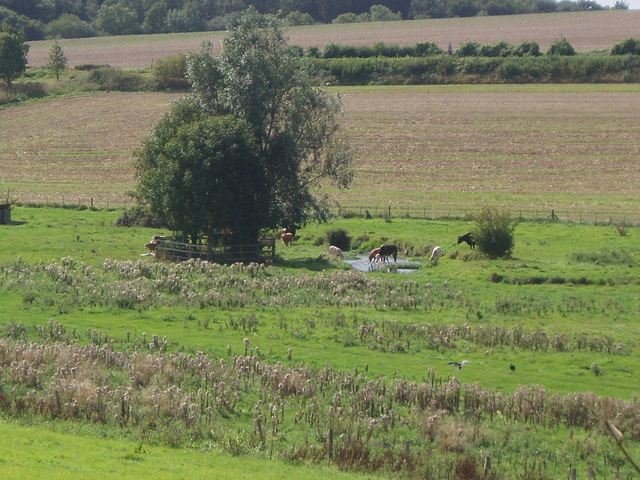
- Interactive map of St Clair's Meadow
- Type: Nature reserve
- Location: Soberton, Hampshire
- OS grid: SU610156
- Area: 16 hectares (40 acres)
- Manager: Hampshire and Isle of Wight Wildlife Trust

St Clair's Meadow is a 16-hectare (40-acre) nature reserve near Soberton in Hampshire. It is managed by the Hampshire and Isle of Wight Wildlife Trust.

The River Meon flows through this grassland site, and it has diverse wildlife. There are water voles and kingfishers along the river, and insects include beautiful demoiselle damselflies, golden-ringed dragonflies and many species of butterfly.
