= Copythorne Common =

Nature reserve in Hampshire, England

Coordinates: 50.937°N 1.562°W

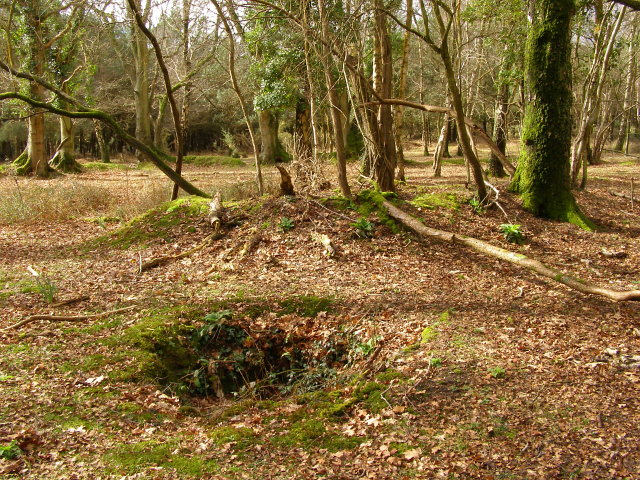
- Interactive map of Copythorne Common
- Type: Nature reserve
- Location: Southampton, Hampshire
- OS grid: SU 309 154
- Area: 17 hectares (42 acres)
- Manager: Hampshire and Isle of Wight Wildlife Trust

Copythorne Common is a 17-hectare (42-acre) nature reserve west of Southampton in Hampshire. It is managed by the Hampshire and Isle of Wight Wildlife Trust. It is part of the New Forest, which is a Special Area of Conservation and a Site of Special Scientific Interest.

The common has grassland, woods and dry heath. Birds include long-tailed tits and woodlarks, while there are reptiles such as slow worms, adders and common lizards.
