= Hockley Meadows =

Nature reserve in Hampshire, England

Coordinates: 51.026°N 1.323°W

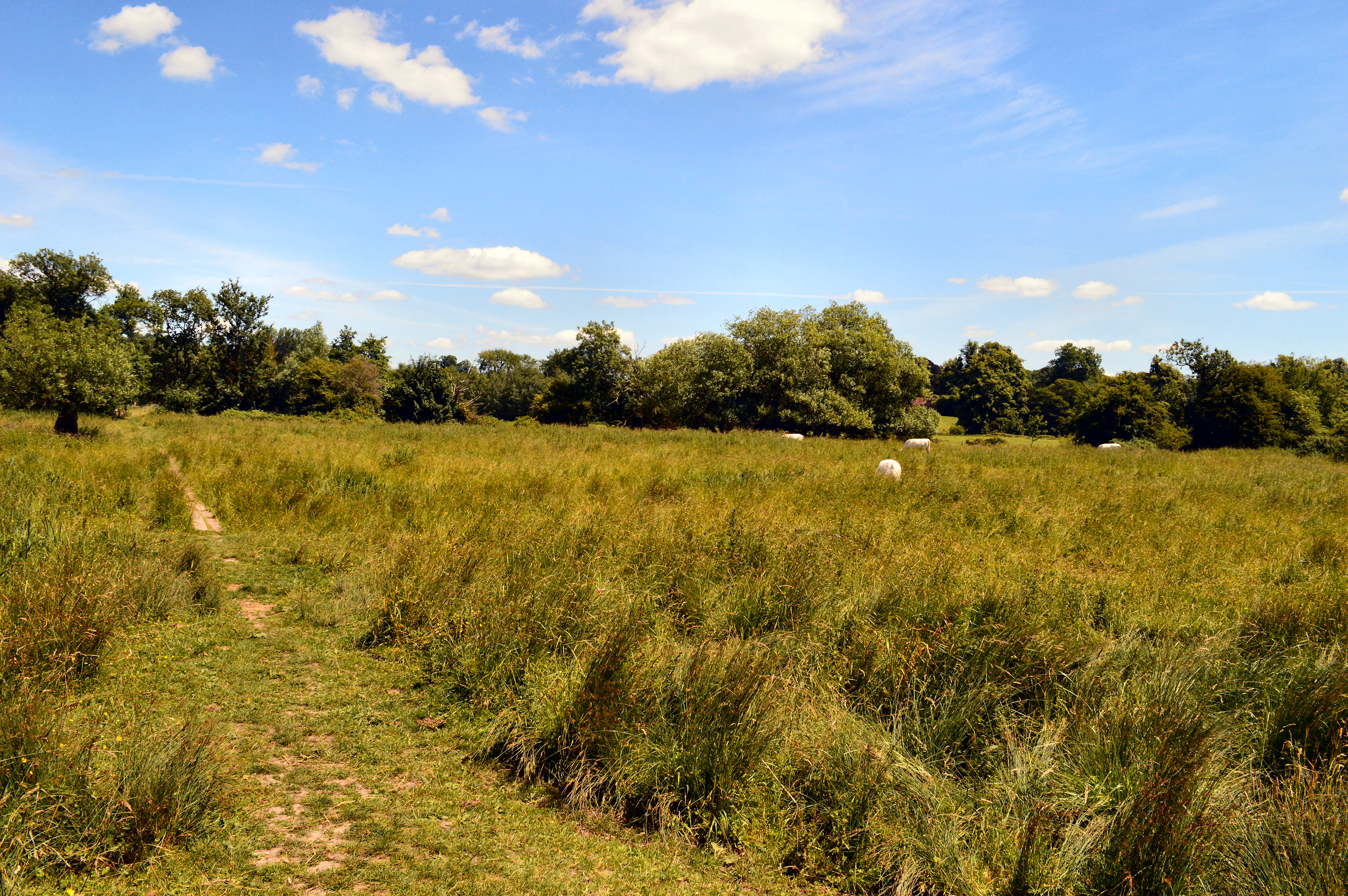
- Interactive map of Hockley Meadows
- Type: Nature reserve
- Location: Winchester, Hampshire
- OS grid: SU476254
- Area: 9 hectares (22 acres)
- Manager: Hampshire and Isle of Wight Wildlife Trust

Hockley Meadows is a 9-hectare (22-acre) nature reserve south of Winchester in Hampshire. It is managed by the Hampshire and Isle of Wight Wildlife Trust. It is part of the River Itchen SSSI (Site of Special Scientific Interest) and Special Area of Conservation.

This site has water meadows, a stream, willow carr, reedbeds and grassland, which is maintained by cattle grazing. There are brown trout in the stream and flowering plants include southern marsh orchids, water avens and cuckoo flowers.
