= Ancells Farm =

Nature reserve in England

Coordinates: 51.294°N 0.820°W

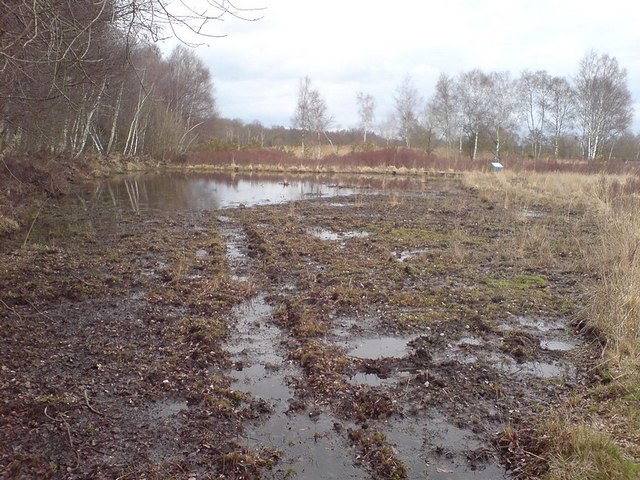
- Interactive map of Ancells Farm
- Type: Nature reserve
- Location: Fleet, Hampshire
- OS grid: SU 824 557
- Area: 12 hectares (30 acres)
- Manager: Hampshire and Isle of Wight Wildlife Trust

Ancells Farm is a 12-hectare (30-acre) nature reserve in Fleet in Hampshire. It is managed by the Hampshire and Isle of Wight Wildlife Trust. It is part of Foxlease and Ancells Meadows, which is a Site of Special Scientific Interest.

This site has heathland and ponds with diverse fauna and flora. It has many flying insects, which provide food for bats. Flora include bog myrtle, Bog asphodel and several species of orchid.
