= Coulters Dean =

Protected area in Hampshire, England

Coordinates: 50.966°N 0.938°W

- Site of Special Scientific Interest
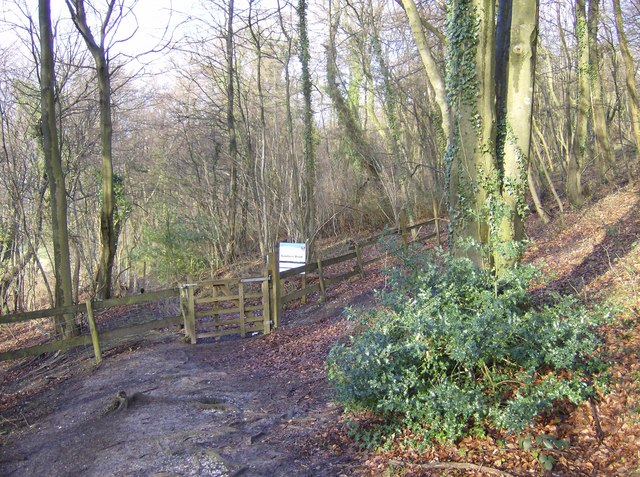
- Location of Coulters Dean.
- Area of search: Hampshire
- Grid reference: SU 747 190
- Interest: Biological
- Area: 2.2 hectares (5.4 acres)
- Notification date: 1984
- Location map: Magic Map

Coulters Dean is a 2.2-hectare (5.4-acre) biological Site of Special Scientific Interest south-east of Buriton in Hampshire. It is part of the 4-hectare (9.9-acre) Coulters Dean nature reserve, which is managed by the Hampshire and Isle of Wight Wildlife Trust.

This is chalk grassland on a west facing slope of the South Downs. It has a rich flora and invertebrate fauna, which has been recorded periodically since 1914. Flowering plants include horseshoe vetch, rampion, clustered bellflower and at least eleven species of orchid.
