= Chappetts Copse =

Woodland in the Meon Valley, Hampshire, England

Coordinates: 51.006°N 1.071°W

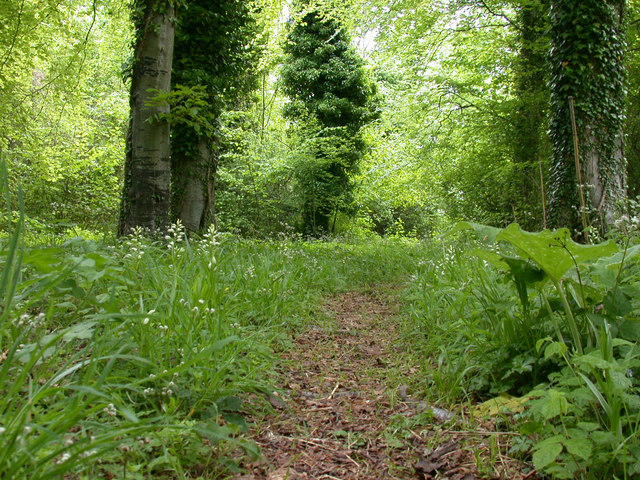
- Interactive map of Chappetts Copse
- Type: Nature reserve
- Location: West Meon, Hampshire
- OS grid: SU 653 234
- Area: 12 hectares (30 acres)
- Manager: Hampshire and Isle of Wight Wildlife Trust

Chappetts Copse is a 12-hectare (30-acre) nature reserve east of West Meon in Hampshire. It is owned and managed by the Hampshire and Isle of Wight Wildlife Trust.

This ancient ash and beech wood has many rare fungi and plants. Orchids include broad-leaved helleborine and bird's-nest, and there are butterflies such as the speckled wood and silver-washed fritillary.
