= Flexford Nature Reserve =

Nature reserve in Hampshire, England

Coordinates: 50.991°N 1.397°W

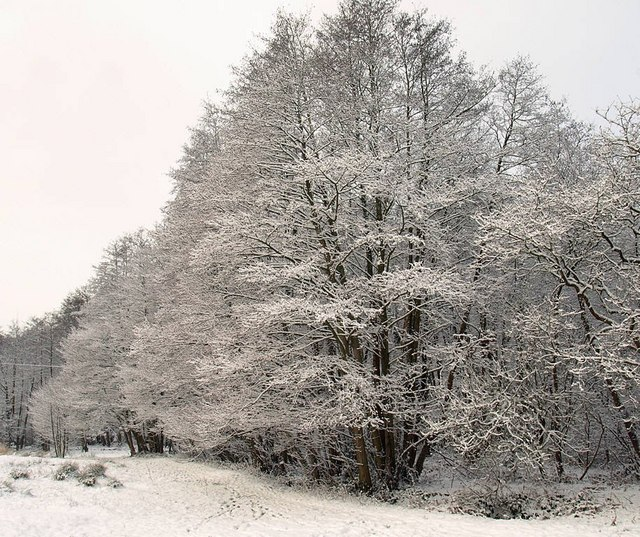
- Interactive map of Flexford Nature Reserve
- Type: Nature reserve
- Location: Chandler's Ford, Hampshire
- OS grid: SU 424 215
- Area: 18 hectares (44 acres)
- Manager: Hampshire and Isle of Wight Wildlife Trust

Flexford Nature Reserve is a 18-hectare (44-acre) nature reserve in Chandler's Ford in Hampshire. It is managed by the Hampshire and Isle of Wight Wildlife Trust.

This reserve is in two areas separated by the Eastleigh–Romsey railway line. It has wet meadows and ancient woodland trees such as alder and ground flora such as ramsons. Birds include siskins and lesser redpolls.
