= Pamber Forest and Silchester Common =

Nature reserve in Hampshire, England

Coordinates: 51.347°N 1.117°W

- Site of Special Scientific Interest
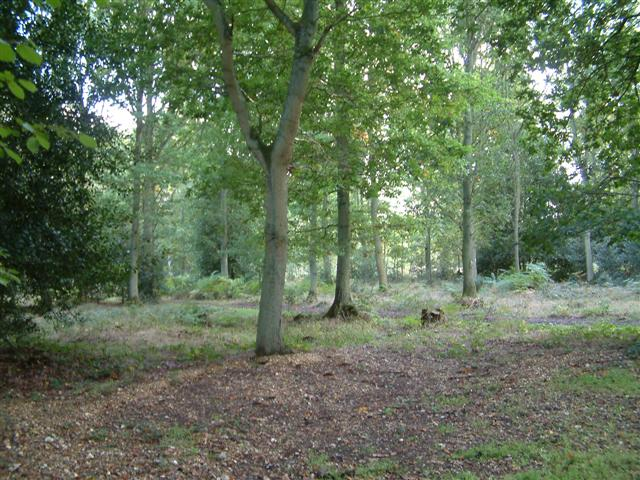
- Pamber Forest
- Location of Pamber Forest and Silchester Common.
- Area of search: Hampshire
- Grid reference: SU 616 612
- Interest: Biological
- Area: 341.7 hectares (844 acres)
- Notification date: 1994
- Location map: Magic Map

Pamber Forest and Silchester Common is a 341.7-hectare (844-acre) biological Site of Special Scientific Interest in Tadley in Hampshire. Pamber Forest and Upper Inhams Copse is managed by the Hampshire and Isle of Wight Wildlife Trust. Upper Inhams Copse was purchased by the Trust in 2001 and added to Pamber Forest.

Pamber Forest is a Local Nature Reserve owned by the Englefield estate. Pamber Forest has hazel coppice dominated by oak standards. At the southern end are plants associated with ancient woodland, such as orpine, wood horsetail, lily of the valley, wild daffodil and the rare mountain fern. The woodland has over forty nationally rare or uncommon species.

In 2025, 2 rare micro moths (Gelechia scotinella and Haplotinea insectell) were spotted there for the first time in Hampshire.

Silchester Common is a dry lowland heathlands where heather, bell Heather and gorse dominate.
