= Lymington and Keyhaven Marshes =

Hampshire nature reserve

Coordinates: 50.733°N 1.551°W

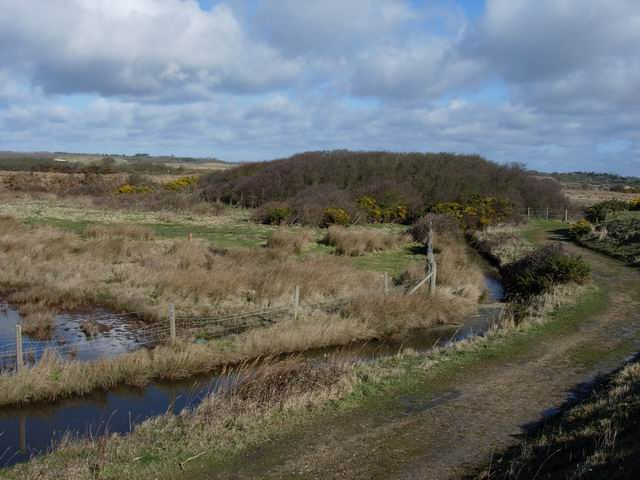
- Keyhaven Marshes
- Interactive map of Lymington and Keyhaven Marshes
- Type: Nature reserve
- Location: Lymington, Hampshire
- OS grid: SZ318927
- Area: 738 hectares (1,820 acres)
- Manager: Hampshire and Isle of Wight Wildlife Trust

Lymington and Keyhaven Marshes is a 738-hectare (1,820-acre) nature reserve which stretches from Keyhaven along the south coast across the Lymington River in Hampshire. It is managed by the Hampshire and Isle of Wight Wildlife Trust. It is part of Solent and Southampton Water Ramsar site and Special Protection Area. Some areas are part of two Special Areas of Conservation, Solent and Isle of Wight Lagoons and Solent Maritime and Solent. It is also part of Hurst Castle and Lymington River Estuary, which is a Site of Special Scientific Interest, and of North Solent Marshes Nature Conservation Review site, Grade 2. Two areas are Geological Conservation Review sites, and two are Local Nature Reserves, Boldre Foreshore and Lymington-Keyhaven Marshes.

This coastal site has saltmarshes and intertidal muds. Birds of prey include peregrine falcons, marsh harriers and merlins, while black-headed gulls and sandwich terns feed on fish in the marshes. Yellow-horned poppies, sea campions and sea aster grow in the salty mud.

There is no public access to the site.
