= Emer Bog and Baddesley Common =

Nature reserve in Hampshire, United Kingdom

Coordinates: 50.991°N 1.439°W

Baddesley Common
- Site of Special Scientific Interest
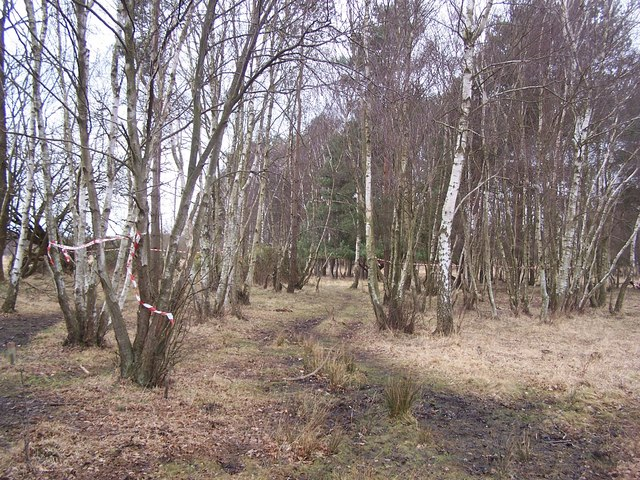
- Location of Baddesley Common.
- Area of search: Hampshire
- Grid reference: SU 395 214
- Interest: Biological
- Area: 39.0 hectares (96 acres)
- Notification date: 1982
- Location map: Magic Map

Emer Bog and Baddesley Common is a 50-hectare (120-acre) nature reserve north of North Baddesley in Hampshire. It is managed by the Hampshire and Isle of Wight Wildlife Trust. An area of 39.0 hectares (96 acres) is designated as Baddesley Common biological Site of Special Scientific Interest. An area of 37.6 hectares (93 acres) is designated Emer Bog Special Area of Conservation

Most of this site is valley bog, together with damp grassland, heath and woods. The bog is not grazed and it has a rich flora and fauna, including many moths. Plants include reed, marsh cinquefoil and bog bean. There is also an area of acidic grassland with a rich flora.
