= Odiham Castle =

Ruined castle in Hampshire, England

Coordinates: 51°15′41.11″N 0°57′42.20″W

Odiham (King John’s) Castle
- North Warnborough, Hampshire, England
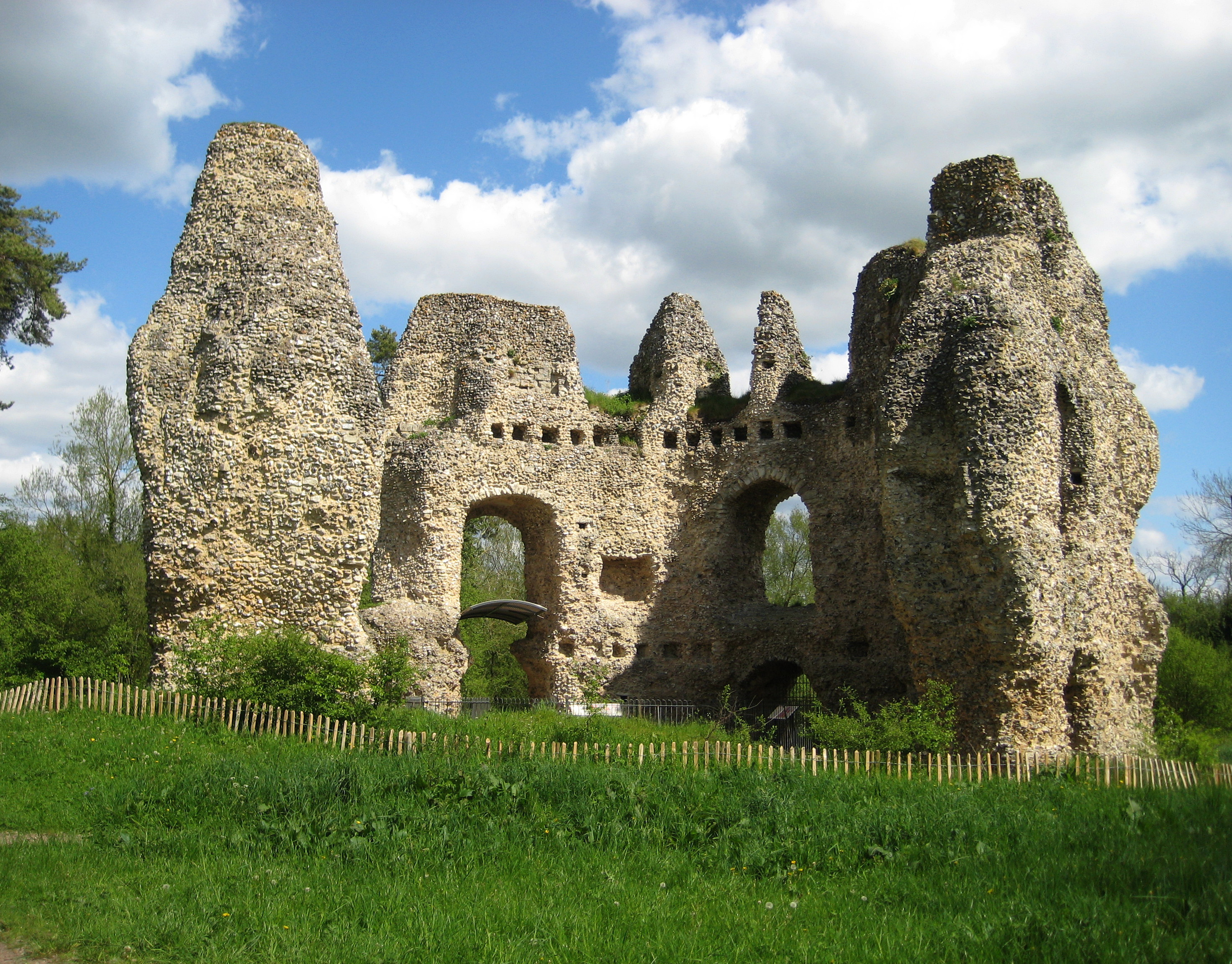
- Ruins of Odiham (King John’s) Castle.

Site information
- Type: Shell keep with outer bailey
- Owner: Hampshire County Council
- Open to the public: Yes
- Condition: Ruin

Location
- Height: Up to 9 metres (30 ft)

Site history
- Built: 1207–1214
- Built by: King John
- In use: Until mid 16th century
- Materials: Flint; Lime mortar Timber
- Battles/wars: First Barons' War
- Events: Hosted Parliament in the 13th century Prison of Scottish King David II

Odiham Castle (also known locally as King John's Castle) is a ruined castle situated near Odiham in Hampshire, United Kingdom.

It is one of only three fortresses built by King John during his reign. The site was possibly chosen by King John because he had visited the area in 1204 and it lay halfway between Windsor and Winchester.

== Construction ==
Odiham Castle was built on 20 acres (8 ha) of land acquired from the local lord, Robert the Parker, by modifying a bend in the River Whitewater.

The castle, which took seven years to complete, had a three-storey stone keep, an inner round moat and an outer square moat, as well as two moated baileys. There were also raised banking and palisades. Notably, the stronghold also had a domus regis or king's house.

Scrolls held by the Public Record Office indicate that total expenditure between the start of work in 1207 and 1214, when work ceased, amounted to £1,000 (equivalent to £1,868,500 in 2025).

== History ==
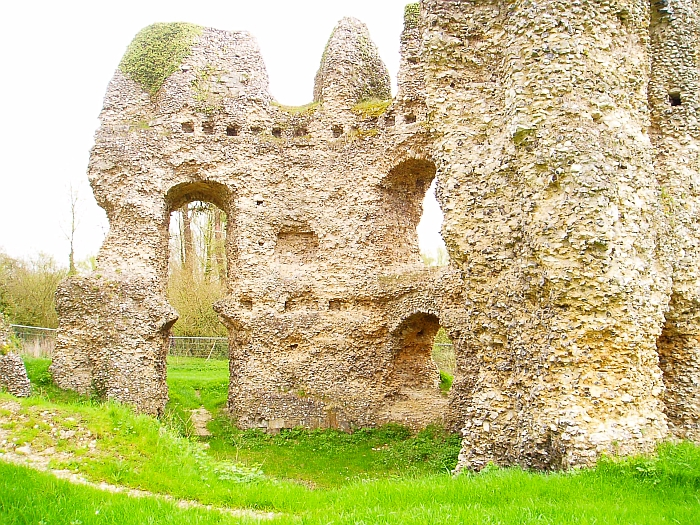

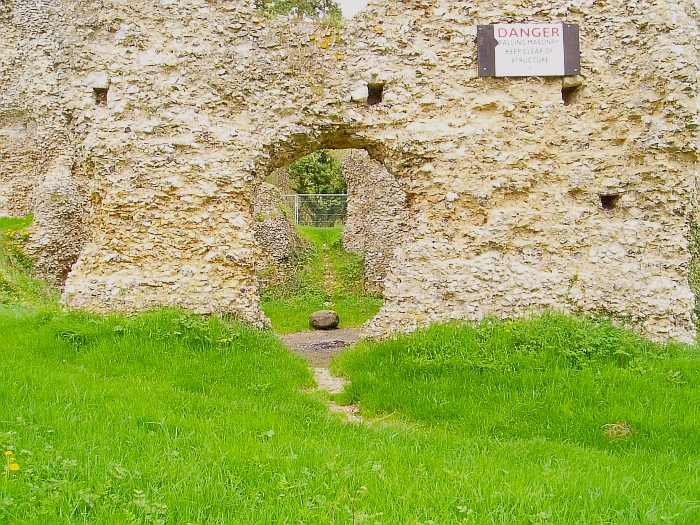

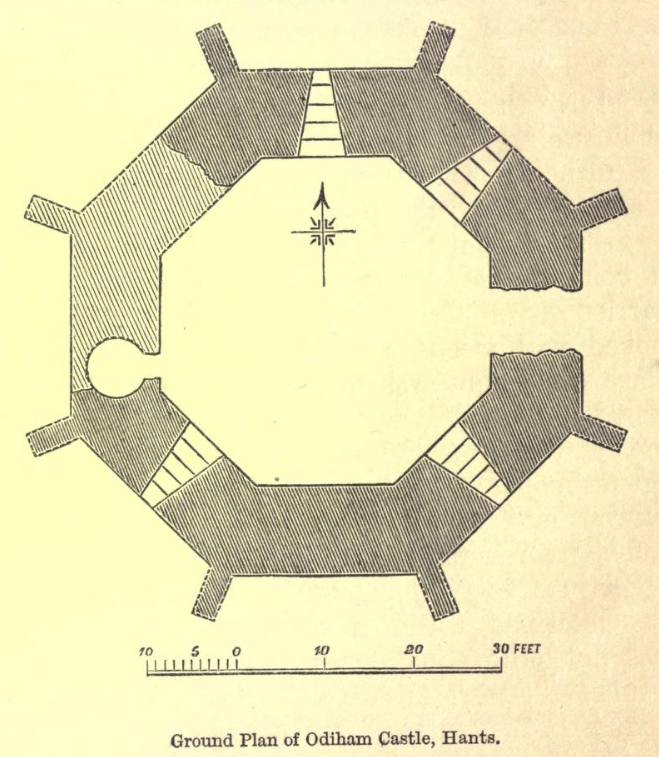
A ground plan of the keep at Odiham Castle, published by the Royal Archaeological Institute of Great Britain and Ireland in 1872.

In 1215 it was from either Odiham or Windsor that King John rode out to Runnymede, where he met the barons and attached his seal to Magna Carta. A year later Odiham Castle was captured by the French after a two-week siege during the First Barons' War in 1216. The garrison of just 13 surrendered on 9 July 1216. At some point over the next nine years the keep was renovated, possibly to remedy the damage done to it by the French forces. It has been suggested that at the same time the mound on which the keep sat was raised by 5 metres and an inner moat surrounding the keep was added to the defences. However, the inner moat was likely in place prior to the siege.

In 1238 Simon de Montfort married King John's daughter Eleanor just two years after she had been granted Odiham by her brother, King Henry III. In the following year a kitchen was added on a bridge over the inner moat and a new hall was added on the outside of the keep. During the same period a second building was constructed over the moat, this time on the south eastern side of the keep, to provide extra living space.

In 1263 De Montfort rebelled against Henry and died at the Battle of Evesham in 1265; Eleanor was exiled. Odiham Castle was again retained by the Crown.

The castle was also involved in the rebellion led by the powerful Despenser family against Roger Mortimer and Queen Isabella of France, the wife of Edward II.

Odiham manor, the royal estate which predates the castle, hosted Parliament at least once, in 1303. King David II of Scotland, after his capture at the Battle of Neville's Cross in 1346, was imprisoned here for 11 years. He was held under a light guard and was allowed to keep a household. Using the castle as a prison seems to have been common practice during the 13th and 14th centuries; the nearby Manor of Greywell was required to provide guards one night in three.

By the 15th century Odiham castle was used only as a hunting lodge, and in 1605 it was described as a ruin.

In 1792 the Basingstoke Canal was built through the southern corner of the bailey.

== Preservation ==
Odiham Castle is open to the public. The only visible remains are part of the octagonal keep and outlying earthworks. In September 2007 Hampshire County Council undertook a restoration of the shell keep under guidance from English Heritage. The most southerly corner of the moat survives in the form of a small overgrown pond on the opposite side of the canal from the rest of the castle.

Two series of archaeological excavations have been carried out at the castle, one in 1953 reported in a local newspaper, and the other between 1981 and 1985, carried out by Hampshire County Council Museum Services.
