= Bidden =

Village in Hampshire, England

Coordinates: 51.23°N 00.99°W

- Location within Hampshire
- OS grid reference: SU7049
- Shire county: Hampshire
- Region: South East
- Country: England
- Sovereign state: United Kingdom
- Police: Hampshire and Isle of Wight
- Fire: Hampshire and Isle of Wight
- Ambulance: South Central

Bidden is a village in Hampshire, England.
