= Testwood Lakes =

Nature reserve in Hampshire, England

Coordinates: 50.93610°N 1.50612°W

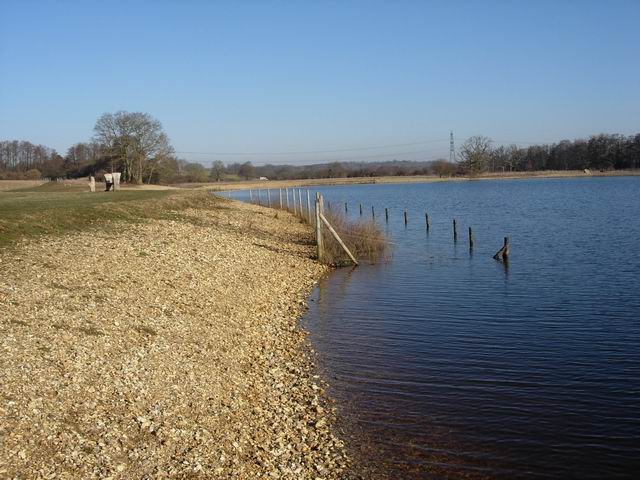
- Interactive map of Testwood Lakes
- Type: Nature reserve
- Location: Southampton, Hampshire
- OS grid: SU 347 155
- Area: 55 hectares (140 acres)
- Manager: Hampshire and Isle of Wight Wildlife Trust

Testwood Lakes is a 55-hectare (140-acre) nature reserve in Totton to the northwest of Southampton in Hampshire, England. It is managed by the Hampshire and Isle of Wight Wildlife Trust. The three lakes, which are owned by Southern Water and provide water for Hampshire, are called Little Testwood Lake, Testwood Lake and Meadow Lake. There is a visitor centre at the site.

== Scouts ==
The lake was opened for boating activities managed by Eling Sea Scouts in late summer 2005; the current boating licence runs between 1 March to 31 October. The lake is available for hire to scout troops and other recognised youth groups.

The 4th New Forest North (Eling) Sea Scout group has built a headquarters building at Testwood Lakes which is their base for watersport activities.

=== Events and activities ===
The Testwood Lakes Centre is open to the public most week days and weekends in the summer and at various times during the week. Guided walks, events and activities take place throughout the year. The Centre, which has a permanent exhibition featuring themes of water, wildlife and conservation, is open to schools, community groups and individuals, with facilities such as a well-equipped classroom for up to 60 children and two function rooms available for hire.

There is coarse fishing on Little Testwood Lake by permit from the TVAC&SPS Angling club. The lake is 30 feet deep in the middle and contains large bream, tench, pike, perch, roach, chub and eels.

=== Wildfowl ===
The Lakes are attracting increasing numbers of wildfowl during the winter, including mallard, Eurasian teal, northern shoveller, tufted duck, common pochard, gadwall and Eurasian wigeon. Eurasian oystercatcher have already bred and it is hoped that northern lapwing and common redshank will too.

=== Flora ===
The ground flora of Alder Gully is very rich including lesser spearwort, bluebell, yellow pimpernel, moschatel, red campion and foxglove.
