= Avon Valley, Western Australia =

Avon Valley may refer to:

- the fertile land in the catchment of the Avon River (Western Australia)
- the Avon Valley Cattle Station, also known as Munja Aboriginal Cattle Station or Munja Aboriginal reserve
- the Avon Valley National Park
- the final Eastern Railway (Western Australia) route through the valley

== See also ==
- Avon (disambiguation)
- River Avon (disambiguation)
