= River Whitewater =

River in Hampshire, England

Whitewater
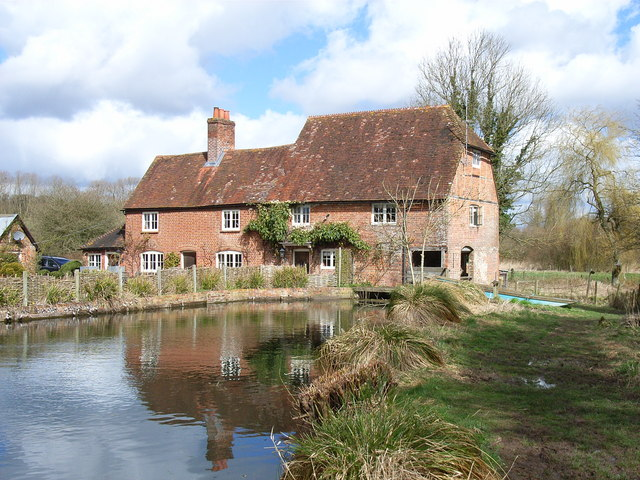
- Greywell Mill on the upper reaches of the River Whitewater

Location
- Country: England
- Counties: Hampshire

Physical characteristics
- Source
  - location: Bidden
  - coordinates: 51°14′15″N 0°59′14″W
- Mouth: River Blackwater
  - location: South-east of Swallowfield
  - coordinates: 51°21′59″N 0°56′10″W
- Length: 12.2 mi (19.6 km)

Basin features
- Tributaries
  - right: River Hart

The River Whitewater rises at springs near Bidden Grange Farm between Upton Grey and Greywell in Hampshire, England. It flows northeast and is a tributary of the River Blackwater near Swallowfield. It was noted on Jansson's map of Hampshire of 1646.

The settlements of Greywell, North Warnborough, Hook, Hartley Wintney, Rotherwick, West Green, Mattingley, Bramshill and Heckfield lie on the River Whitewater.

The river contains a variety of species of fish. Fishing on part of the river is controlled by Farnborough and District Angling Society which has separate coarse and fly fishing sections. Like many rivers in the south of England, non-indigenous mink and signal crayfish are present.

== Route ==
The Whitewater rises as a series of springs and channels near Bidden, in the Odiham Fen Site of Special Scientific Interest (SSSI). The underlying chalk aquifer supplies base-rich water which encourages the growth of fen vegetation, notably lesser tussock-sedge and giant spearmoss. Almost immediately, the channels form into a pond called Mill Head, which formed part of the infrastructure for Greywell Mill. The small mill building, with an attached house, is a grade II listed structure. There are further springs and channels as the river heads north eastwards, to reach Deptford Bridge. Close by is the eastern portal of Greywell Tunnel, a 1,230-yard (1,120 m) tunnel built in 1792 for the Basingstoke Canal. The portal was restored in 1975, and although the canal is now navigable almost to its entrance, the tunnel is unlikely to be restored, as part of the roof collapsed, it has been colonised by a large number of bats, and the M3 motorway has been built over the original route beyond the tunnel. Beyond Deptford Bridge, there are two weirs, and Greywell Pumping Station stands on the right bank. This has extracted groundwater from the underlying chalk aquifer for use as drinking water since the early 1900s. Around 6 to 7 Ml per day are extracted, and in 2012 a study was carried out to see what effects the extraction was having on the Odiham Fen SSSI. There is a second part of the SSSI beyond the pumping station.

The canal crosses over the river on an aqueduct, and the river curves around the edge of Odiham Castle. Only a small part of the grade I listed octagonal keep, construction of which may have been for King John, remains. It was built between 1207 and 1212, and the grounds of the moated site are a scheduled monument, although parts of the earthworks and moat were damaged when the Basingstoke Canal was built. To the east of the castle is the site of Castle Mill, a ford where Mill Lane crosses the river, and then the mill pond for Warnborough Mill at Warnborough Green. The mill itself consisted of two storeys and an attic, with a two-storey house attached. It dates from the 18th century, and has been converted into a restaurant. Just beyond the tailrace the river is crossed by the B3499 Hook Road, and the A287 road, with a weir between the two bridges. Several more weirs follow, as the river threads its way between Lodge Farm on the right bank, the core of which is a grade II* listed timber framed hall-house, dating from the 15th century, and the site of a Roman villa on the left bank. Next comes Poland Mill, a large two-storey 18th century rectangular building, which originally had six water wheels, of which one with a cast iron frame remains.

The next section, which follows a more northerly course, is marked by bridges carrying the M3 motorway, the South West Main Line railway and the A30 road over the river, to the east of Hook. Beyond them is Hook Mill, with two storeys and an attic, and an attached house with two storeys. They date from the 17th and 18th centuries, and both now form part of a single house, in which the huge timbers of the mill building are still visible. Dipley Bridge carries a road over the river at the hamlet of Dipley, beyond which is Dipley Mill. The building is predominantly 18th century with modern additions, but clearly has earlier origins. After Mattingley Clappers Bridge there is a long rural section where a stream from the lake in Highfield Park joins the left bank, but there are no road crossings until the B3011 road is reached at Holdshott Farm, near the village of Hazeley. Holdshott farm house is a late 18th-century building with two storeys and an attic. A timber-framed mill adjoins the north end, but it has been extensively renovated, and the cladding is modern.

The main tributary of the Whitewater is the River Hart, which joins on the right bank, before the combined flow passes under Heckfield Bridge. It has a single cambered arch, and was constructed of red brick in the mid-19th century. Riseley Mill is located on the final stretch, before the river crosses under another bridge to join the Blackwater River on its left bank. The mill building is the tallest on the river, having four storeys.

== Ecology ==
In its upper reaches, the Whitewater is a classic chalk stream. Its water is derived from an underlying chalk aquifer, as a series of spring in the Odiham Fen SSSI. Although it flows through peat in the fen, the water is clear, and the flows are stable. As the river approaches Hook, the geology alters, with the underlying chalk replaced by clay and gravel substrates. Here the flow becomes less stable, the banks are somewhat steeper, and the water becomes slightly coloured. The Water Framework Directive was a Europe-wide initiative introduced in 2000 to improve the status of water bodies, but the Whitewater has not achieved good ecological status, due to the poor condition of its fish population. This is largely due to the number of weirs that have historically been associated with milling, making it difficult for fish to move upstream and fragmenting the habitat. The river contains game fish, particularly brown trout, and coarse fish, including barbel, chub, dace, perch, pike, and roach. Fishing takes place along much of the river.

Several sections of the river are used as trout fisheries, where the wild trout are augmented by the addition of stock from a hatchery. In 2012 the Wild Trout Trust carried out a survey of the 1.9-mile (3.1 km) section from below Hook Mill to Dipley Bridge, just above Dipley Mill, because the Whitewater Syndicate who have managed that part of the river as a fishery for 30 years were concerned that river flows seemed to be reducing, and that the growth of aquatic plants was declining. Lack of plants resulted in fewer flies, a major source of food for trout, and a general decline in the fishery. The survey identified a number of factors contributing to the state of the fishery. At the downstream end, the effects of Dipley Mill are that there is a long section of deep, slow-moving water, which is not ideal for trout. There were sections where weed growth was affected by a lack of light, caused by large Alder trees growing on the banks. Trout need dappled shade, and selective coppicing of the trees would result in improved weed growth. There were areas where water was leaking through the banks, which have been raised historically to impound the water for milling. Such leakage poses a threat to the integrity of the bank, and this is exacerbated by the arrival of the non-native North American signal crayfish, which burrow into banks causing further erosion.

A number of low weirs had been built across the stream bed, in an attempt to improve water levels, but had resulted in slower flows depositing fine silt behind them, reducing their effectiveness. The report recommended that some of them should be removed, and replaced with large woody debris on the verges of the channel, to create faster-flowing water and help to scour silt from the bed, resulting in better conditions for plants, invertebrates and fish such as trout that prefer faster flows. Further upstream, there was evidence of water-crowfoot growing in the water. This depends on the river bed being composed of gravel, and fast flows, and is a typical chalk stream plant. It provides important habitat for upwing river flies.

== Water Quality ==
The Environment Agency measure water quality of the river systems in England. Each is given an overall ecological status, which may be one of five levels: high, good, moderate, poor and bad. There are several components that are used to determine this, including biological status, which looks at the quantity and varieties of invertebrates, angiosperms and fish. Chemical status, which compares the concentrations of various chemicals against known safe concentrations, is rated good or fail.

The water quality of the Whitewater was as follows in 2019.

| Section | Ecological Status | Chemical Status | Overall Status | Length | Catchment |
|---|---|---|---|---|---|
| Whitewater | Poor | Fail | Poor | 12.2 miles (19.6 km) | 42.37 square miles (109.7 km^{2}) |

Reasons for the quality being less than good include discharge from sewage treatment works; runoff from agricultural land; physical barriers such as weirs and impounding of the water which prevent the free migration of fish and other species; and the presence of the North American signal crayfish, an invasive species. The biological status is high for invertebrates and good for aquatic plants, but the barriers to fish movement result in the overall status being poor.

== Milling ==
There is clear evidence for eight water mills along the course of the Whitewater. All of them were corn mills in 1883. Taylor's map of 1759 shows three mills on the river, labelled Paper Mill at Wolson Bridge, Polern Mill (now Poland Mill) and Odiam Mill (now Warnborough Mill, Odiham). Greenwood's 1826 map shows Riseley Mill, Holdshott Mill, Dipley Mill, Paper Mill and Poland Mill.

There has been a mill on the site of Greywell Mill since at least 1600, which in 1608 was known as Cutmill or Grewell Mill. The present three-storey building dates from the 18th century and a two-storey mill house is attached. The river was embanked, to provide sufficient head for a wooden breastshot waterwheel. This powered two pairs of stones, mounted in a hurst frame. The mill races and sluices have survived, and some of the machinery is still in situ, but most is missing. The first known miller was Robert Hawkins who insured the brick and tiled grist mill and mill tackle for £200 in 1767. In the 1910s the wooden buckets on the wheel were replaced with iron ones, which were not particularly suitable because of their weight. The wheel was supplemented by a steam engine, located in another building. The mill stopped working in 1932 when the mechanism failed, and the owner did not repair it because fishing on the river was better when it was not working. Part of the mill pond was used for growing watercress until about 1970.

When the Domesday Book was compiled in 1086, there were eight water mills listed in Odiham. Some of them were owned by Robert the Parker around 1200, from whom King John took 20 acres (8.1 ha) on which to build Odiham Castle. Robert's mills were burnt by the king, and in 1235 his rent was reduced by 20 shillings on account of the meadows he had lost to the king. During the reigns of Edward I and Edward III, one of Robert's descendants, William Parker, held a mill and half a hide of land. Warnborough Mill was destroyed by a fire in 1337–38, but was rebuilt in 1345–46. Records mention a fulling mill in North Warnborough in 1555–56, and a mill in Warnborough in 1630, but it is not clear if they were the same or different mills.

The river above Castle Mill was embanked, and although the sluices survive, the mill itself burnt down in 1910, and was not rebuilt. It was described as a large fulling mill at that time, and produced woolen and worsted cloth, while weaving was carried out in the local cottages. After the fire, Sir John Humphries rebuilt most of the mill house in the 1920s, and lived at King's Mill while the work was done. He also landscaped the surrounding area.

As Odiham was officially the Royal Manor of Odiham, Warnborough Mill became known as King's Mill, and was owned by Lords of the Manor until 1920, when the estate was sold. John Hooker was the miller in 1615, and Sydney Loader was the last miller to use it to grind corn in 1895. Around 1904 the machinery was removed, the building was renovated and it became a private house until the early 1990s, when it was converted into the Mill House Restaurant. As part of the conversion, the mill wheel was restored in 1995, and again in 2011. There is a small 3.5-foot (1.1 m) overshot waterwheel in the garden of the restaurant, which may have once been used to generate electricity.

Poland Mill was in the manor of Polling, called Pulling in the 15th century and Polands or Poleing in the 18th, and together with Poland Farm, recalls the name of the earlier manor. The present building dates from the 18th century, and once had six water wheels. The building has been offered for sale several times in the 2010s, when it has been called Whitewater Mill, while the mill house has been referred to as Poland Mill. A room on the ground floor retains some mill wheels, and is used as a cellar.

The parish of Newnham has had two corn mills and a paper mill at various points in its history, as well as a foundry and two brickworks. The eastern boundary of the parish was once on the River Whitewater, and it is probable that one of the two mills was at Hook on the Whitewater, and the other was Lyde Mill on the River Lyde. Newnham village church was served by monks from West Sherborne Priory, and this was facilitated by Henry de Port, who gave money to the priory. A charter that he made in 1130 in this context mentions tithes from two mills in the parish, while in 1766, Edward Chamberlain of Paper Mill was responsible for the upkeep of four panels of the churchyard fence. At the same time, David Crimble of Lyde Mill was responsible for the upkeep of a further two panels. Paper Mill was on the Whitewater below Wolson Bridge, now the Crooked Billet Bridge on the A30 road. The first known mention of a paper maker in the area was in 1749, and Edward Chamberlain was the last known paper maker, mentioned in 1816. The paper mill is marked on I. Taylor's 1759 map of Hampshire, T. Milne's map of 1791, Mudge's map of 1817 and Greenwood's map of 1826. When it ceased to be used for making paper, it became a corn mill, known as Hook Mill. The present building dates from the 17th and 18th centuries, when it was still a paper mill, and together with the adjoining mill house it is now part of a private residence.

Dipley Mill was a three-storey building made of red bricks with a tiled roof. It probably had four pairs of stones, and two water wheels. The mill was listed in the Domesday Book, when it belonged to Alfsi son of Brictsi. During the 19th century, a second water wheel was added, but was not entirely successful, as the building shook when the wheels worked in tandem. Milling continued until 1927, when the building was converted into a country house, and the house and gardens were renovated after 2000.

Heckfield had a mill when the Domesday Book was compiled in 1086. The mill and a fishery worth 100 eels a year was given to the Prior and convent of Merton by John de Port some time before 1208, and a survey of the parish in 1341 listed two mills, one at Holdshott and the other at Mattingley. When the abbey was dissolved, ownership of a fulling mill and a watermill reverted to the Lord of the Manor. Holdshott was sold to Charles Shaw-Lefevre in 1817, and the sale included four mills. The mill at Mattingley was also given to the Prior and convent of Merton in 1206, and was probably one of the two mentioned in 1341. It was situated just upstream of Mattingley Clappers Bridge, and was demolished in the late 19th century.

Riseley Mill is the final mill on the river, and the present building dates from the late 18th century. The first recorded miller was Francis Belcher in 1792, who insured the mill for £100 and the nearby granary for £500. The corn mill was originally powered by a wooden undershot water wheel, 10 feet (3.0 m) wide and 13 feet (4.0 m) in diameter. In 1910, the wheel was proving unreliable, but a new iron waterwheel was found to be too small when it arrived, and was never fitted. At some point an oil engine was used to power the machinery, which included four pairs of stones on a hurst frame, and another two on the second floor. During the Second World War, all of the machinery was removed and it was used as a pill-box, protected by thick brickwork around the base. It is probable that the mill was also a bakery, as a huge baker's oven was found in a shed in 1966. The mill building and mill house were sold by the Duke of Wellington's Stratfield estate in 1968, and both became private homes. A fire in the mill in 1991 severely damaged the roof, which had to be replaced.

== Bibliography ==
- Bell, Nigel (June 2004). "Newnham - a history of its parish and its church" (PDF). www.northhampshirechurches.org.uk. Archived (PDF) from the original on 2 July 2020.
- Cumberlidge, Jane (2009). Inland Waterways of Great Britain (8th Ed.). Imray Laurie Norie and Wilson. ISBN 978-1-84623-010-3.
- Ellis, C M (1968). A Gazetteer of the Water, Wind and Tide Mills of Hampshire (PDF). Hampshire Field Club & Archaeological Society.
- Greenwood (1826). "Map of Hampshire". www.geog.port.ac.uk.
- Keel, Toby (12 June 2019). "An idyllic millhouse". Country Life.
- Low, Rob; et al. (2012). "Ecohydrological impact assessment, Greywell Fen, Hampshire" (PDF). Rigare, Jacobs, South East Water. Archived (PDF) from the original on 2 July 2020.
- Millard, Sheila; et al. (2011). "Mill House History". Brunning and Price. Archived from the original on 21 June 2011.
- Page, William, ed. (1911a). "Parishes: Greywell or Grewell". A History of the County of Hampshire. Vol. 4. British History Online.
- Page, William, ed. (1911b). "Parishes: Heckfield". A History of the County of Hampshire. Vol. 4. British History Online.
- Page, William, ed. (1911c). "Parishes: Odiham". A History of the County of Hampshire. Vol. 4. British History Online.
- Shorter, A H (1953). "Paper-Mills in Hampshire" (PDF). Proceedings Vol 18 Part 1. Hampshire Field Club & Archaeological Society. Archived (PDF) from the original on 2 July 2020.
- Taylor, I (1759). "Map of Hampshire". www.geog.port.ac.uk.
- Thomas, Andy (January 2012). "River Whitewater – Whitewater Syndicate" (PDF). Wild Trout Trust. Archived (PDF) from the original on 3 July 2020.
- Vaidya, Ashok, ed. (2013). The Mills and Millers of Hampshire. Vol. 3 - North and East. Hampshire Mills Group.
