= Warwickslade Cutting Railway =

Coordinates: 50.845491°N 1.610058°W

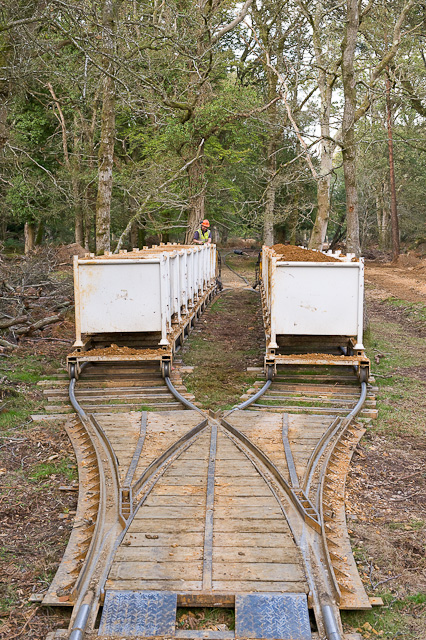
Warwickslade Cutting Railway

The Warwickslade Cutting Railway was a light railway temporarily built to fill in the Warwickslade Cutting, a straight drainage ditch dug circa 1850 in the New Forest of south-east England, with imported gravel and clay. In 2009, the Forestry Commission decided to obliterate it and replace it by a more natural meandering stream.

== Project ==
=== Objective ===
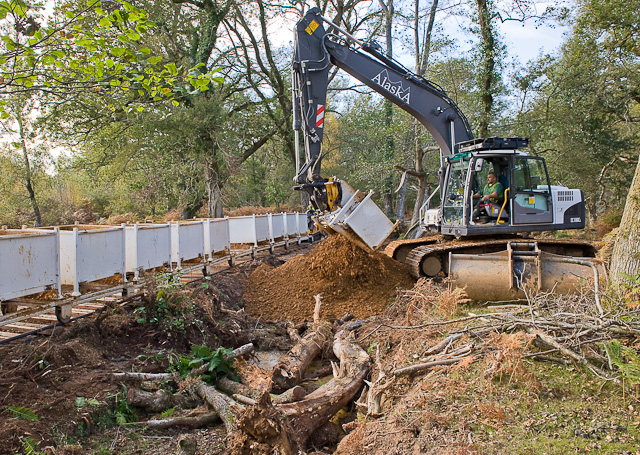
The containers could be removed from the train by an excavator with a special gripper for filling the cutting.

The reason for the works was that Warwickslade Lawn Site of Special Scientific Interest (SSSI) was "in an unfavourable declining condition because the artificially deepened cutting meant that there was no seasonal inundation of the grassland and woodland habitats". Surprisingly, much of the course of the original, pre-1850s, stream could still be seen on the ground. The aim of the works was to reinstate the original stream as closely as possible, whilst filling in the Cutting. It was necessary to bring in 10,000 tonnes of hoggin to fill in the cutting, plus some clay to make plugs to ensure that water followed the desired course.

=== Contractors ===
The contractors were Alaska Environmental Contracting. They used 8, 13 and 18 tonne hydraulic excavators, 10 tonne rubber tracked dumper trucks and an innovative light railway.

To bring in 10,000 tonnes of hoggin would have required 1,000 round trips for a Morooka MST-2200vd tracked dumper truck. The contractors Alaska designed and built an experimental light railway from a forest track to the cutting. By this they reduced the compaction of the soil of the forest by eliminating heavy dumper movements. This allowed work to continue even in wet weather. It also resulted in lower fuel consumption and less noise and pollution. The project cost of £214,500 included plant hire and labour (£106,500) and infill materials (£108,000).

=== Track ===
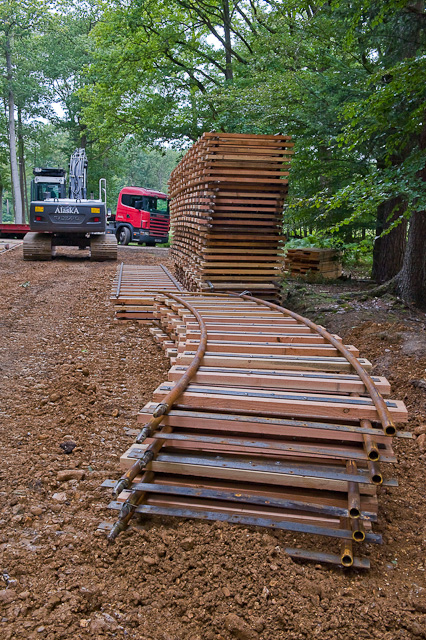
The pre-assembled sections of the track could be assembled with tube and pin joints like those of a toy train.

The track laying began on 2 September 2009 along a wide, grassy forest track. The track consisted of circular steel pipe of about 6mm wall thickness, welded to steel cross members which were in turn bolted to wooden sleepers. One side was fitted with a steel spike to engage with the next section. Thus, it fitted together very much like a toy railway, using preassembled track sections which are either straight or of fixed curvature. The track laying operation looked a bit like a child’s train set on a large scale. The rails, with sleepers ready attached, came in sections - straight or curved to suit their position. The tube and pin joints fitted together exactly as do the rail sections of the toy set.

The purpose of the railway was to reduce the environmental impact of bringing so much material on site. The Morooka dumper truck has an engine of 250 HP whereas Alaska thought that they could shift the same 10 tonnes of gravel in a train powered by a Boxer 532DX mini-skid, a tracked vehicle running on the rails, which has a 32 HP engine. Thus the emissions savings would be substantial. There ought also to be less surface damage. The railtrack had a calculated ground pressure, when loaded by a train carrying a load of 10 tonnes, of under 3 psi, to avoid the sleepers sinking into the occasionally very wet ground. Therefore, no ballast was needed.

The bolts securing the rail to its sleepers have pulled out of the wood occasionally, especially where the Boxer had derailed. This was caused by the weight of the tracked Boxer locomotive pushing down upon the sleepers at a point where they were not well supported. Some of the weight of the Boxer is normally borne by the rails, via its rear steel wheels. Some sleepers disintegrated during the use and some sections needed to be supported by broken branches rammed into cavities under the track. However, as the trains moved slowly, nobody was hurt in occasional derailments and little damage was done. At the conclusion of the drain in-filling, the rail tracks were removed. The project was successfully completed on 19 November 2009.

=== Train ===
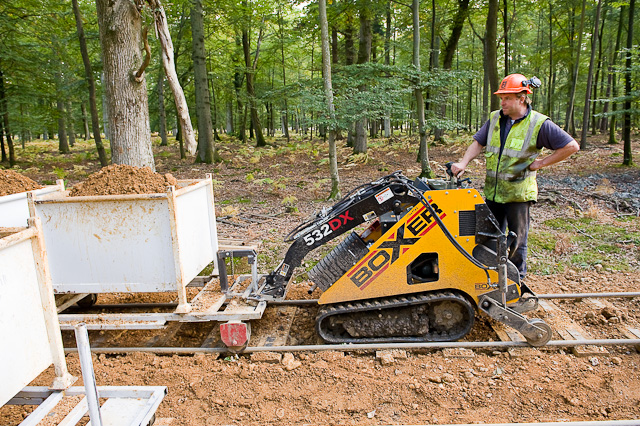
The train was pushed or pulled by Boxer mini-skids whose rubber track ran on the sleepers.

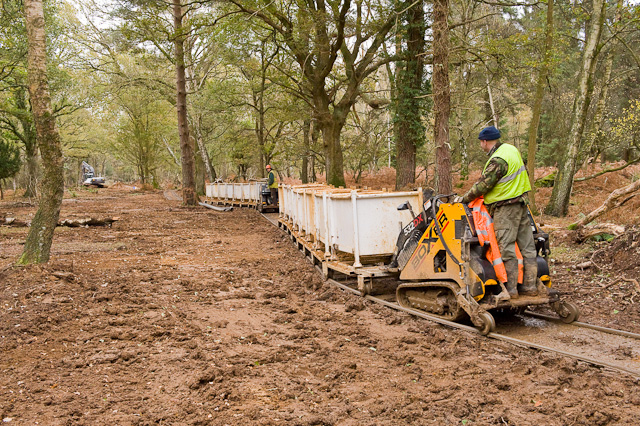
Two empty trains are pulled back towards the loading area

Two trains consisted of white-painted trucks each coupled together. Each 10 tonne train consisted of 10 trucks each taking 1 tonne. The locomotive was the modified Boxer 532DX mini-skid upon which the driver stood, either pushing or pulling the coupled trucks. The trucks had plastic wheels designed either to ride along the cylindrical track or along a flat surface. The wheels had needle roller bearings. The Boxer obtained traction by means of its rubber track bearing upon the sleepers, but at the rear it had two wheels riding upon the track, the height of which could be adjusted hydraulically. They could also be raised to free the Boxer from the track whilst it was negotiating points.

The two trains operated from a newly constructed depot in Vinney Ridge, where points allowed the diversion of one train into a siding. There it was loaded while the other travelled up to a mile southwards towards Brockenhurst where the track runs parallel to the stream. Then a heavy excavator lifted the containers from the bogies, tipped their content into the ditch and placed them back empty onto the train with virtually no sideways movement.
