= Greywell Fen =

UK Site of Special Scientific Interest

Coordinates: 51.252°N 0.971°W

- Site of Special Scientific Interest
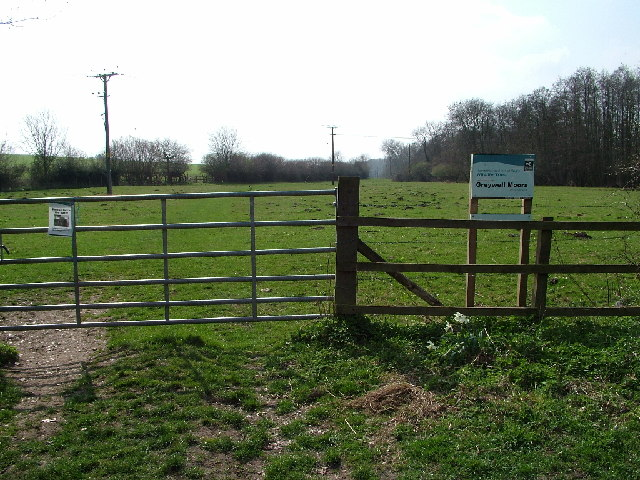
- Location of Greywell Fen.
- Area of search: Hampshire
- Grid reference: SU 719 508
- Interest: Biological
- Area: 38.0 hectares (94 acres)
- Notification date: 1984
- Location map: Magic Map

Greywell Fen is a 38-hectare (94-acre) biological Site of Special Scientific Interest in Greywell in Hampshire. It is a Nature Conservation Review site, Grade 2, and an area of 13 hectares (32 acres) is a nature reserve called Greywell Moors, which is managed by the Hampshire and Isle of Wight Wildlife Trust.

This 2-kilometre (1.2-mile) long site is calcareous fen. There is a large area of wet grassland, which is grazed by cattle, and a small area of carr woodland. Meadow flora include cowslip, dyer's greenweed and pepper-saxifrage.
