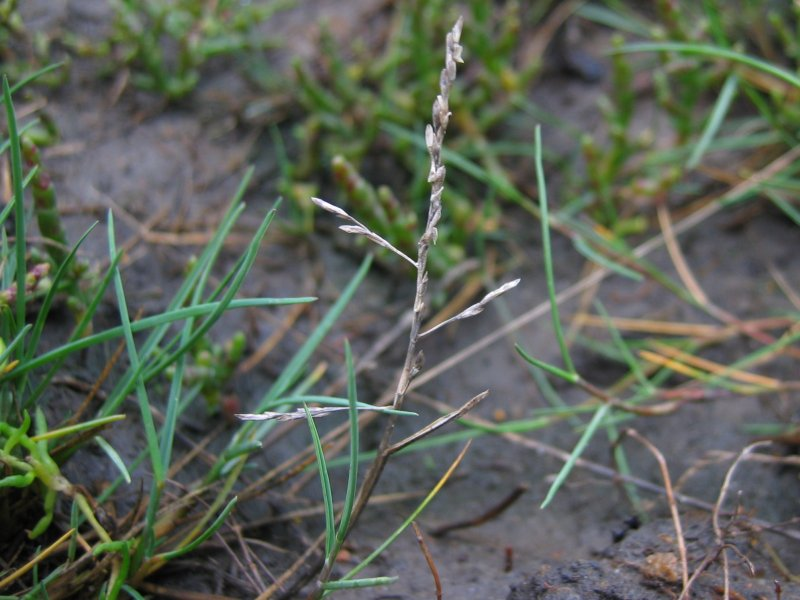

Scientific classification
- Kingdom: Plantae
- Clade: Tracheophytes
- Clade: Angiosperms
- Clade: Monocots
- Clade: Commelinids
- Order: Poales
- Family: Poaceae
- Subfamily: Pooideae
- Genus: Puccinellia
- Species: P. maritima

Binomial name
- Puccinellia maritima (Jacq.) Parl.

= Puccinellia maritima =

Species of grass

Puccinellia maritima is a species of grass known by the common names including seaside alkaligrass, common saltmarsh-grass or sea poa grass. It is native to Western Europe and it is present in most of North East North America. It grows in moist, usually saline soils. It can reach a height of 80 cm and has greyish-green leaves.
