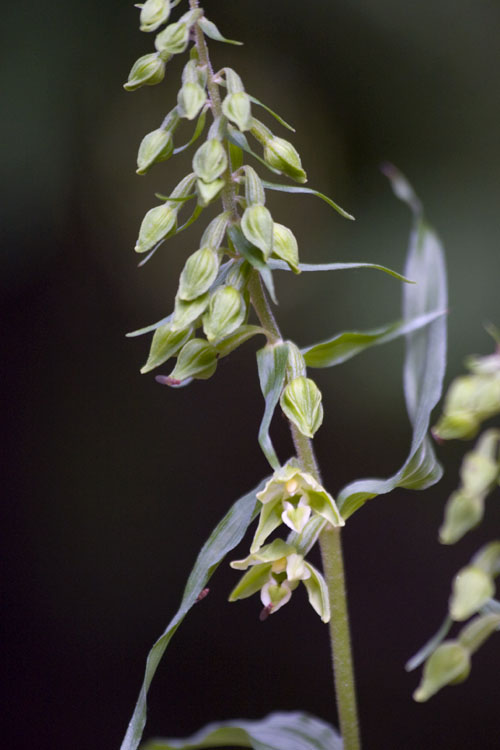

Conservation status
- Least Concern (IUCN 3.1)

Scientific classification
- Kingdom: Plantae
- Clade: Tracheophytes
- Clade: Angiosperms
- Clade: Monocots
- Order: Asparagales
- Family: Orchidaceae
- Subfamily: Epidendroideae
- Genus: Epipactis
- Species: E. phyllanthes

Binomial name
- Epipactis phyllanthes G.E. Sm.

= Epipactis phyllanthes =

Species of orchid

Epipactis phyllanthes, the green-flowered helleborine, is an orchid found in the western Palearctic realm.

== Distribution ==
It is native to Andorra, Belgium, Portugal, Spain, France, Britain, Ireland, Germany, Sweden and Denmark.

== Habitat ==
Its habitats include calcareous substrates in dunes, in scrub, and in beech, oak, and conifer forests.

== Reproduction ==
Epipactis phyllanthes is thought to be always self-pollinated, with pollination occurring before flowers open.
