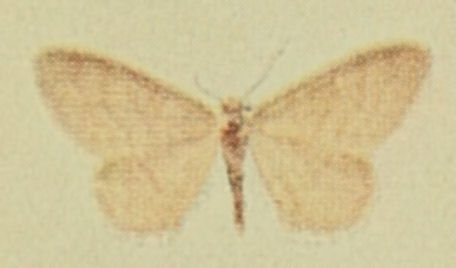

Scientific classification
- Kingdom: Animalia
- Phylum: Arthropoda
- Clade: Pancrustacea
- Class: Insecta
- Order: Lepidoptera
- Family: Geometridae
- Genus: Idaea
- Species: I. dilutaria

Binomial name
- Idaea dilutaria (Hübner, 1799)

= Idaea dilutaria =

Species of moth

Idaea dilutaria, also called the silky wave, is a moth of the family Geometridae. It is found in Europe.

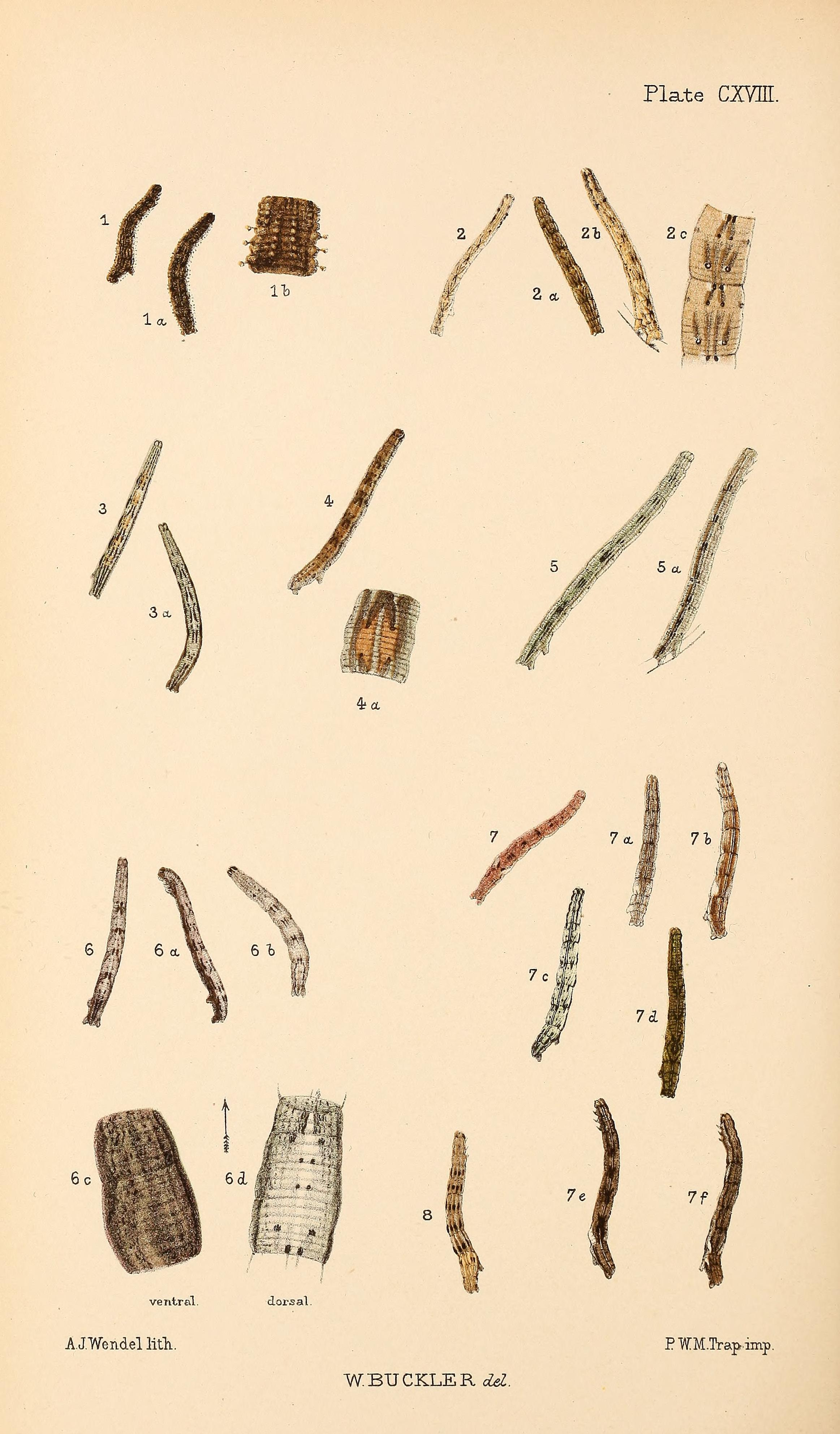
Fig 1,1a Larvae in various stages 1b enlarged details of segments

The species has a wingspan of 20–22 mm.Recognizable by its strongly silky gloss, the absence of costal colouration (the costal margin has merely a sparse dusting of dark scales), the unmarked distal margin and fringe.The ground-colour is yellowish-tinted the discal dots are minute and there are no terminal lines.The other lines are generally all of approximately equal expression, sometimes the postmedian a little stronger, sometimes the median of the forewing weak.The underside is similar, the postmedian line often a little stronger, theantemedian and sometimes the median of the forewing obsolete. The males antennal ciliation is short and even.

The adults fly in one generation in July.

The larvae feed on Helianthemum nummularium.

== Notes ==
1. The flight season refers to the British Isles. This may vary in other parts of the range.
