= Lymington River =

River in Hampshire, England

River Lymington or Lymington River Highland Water
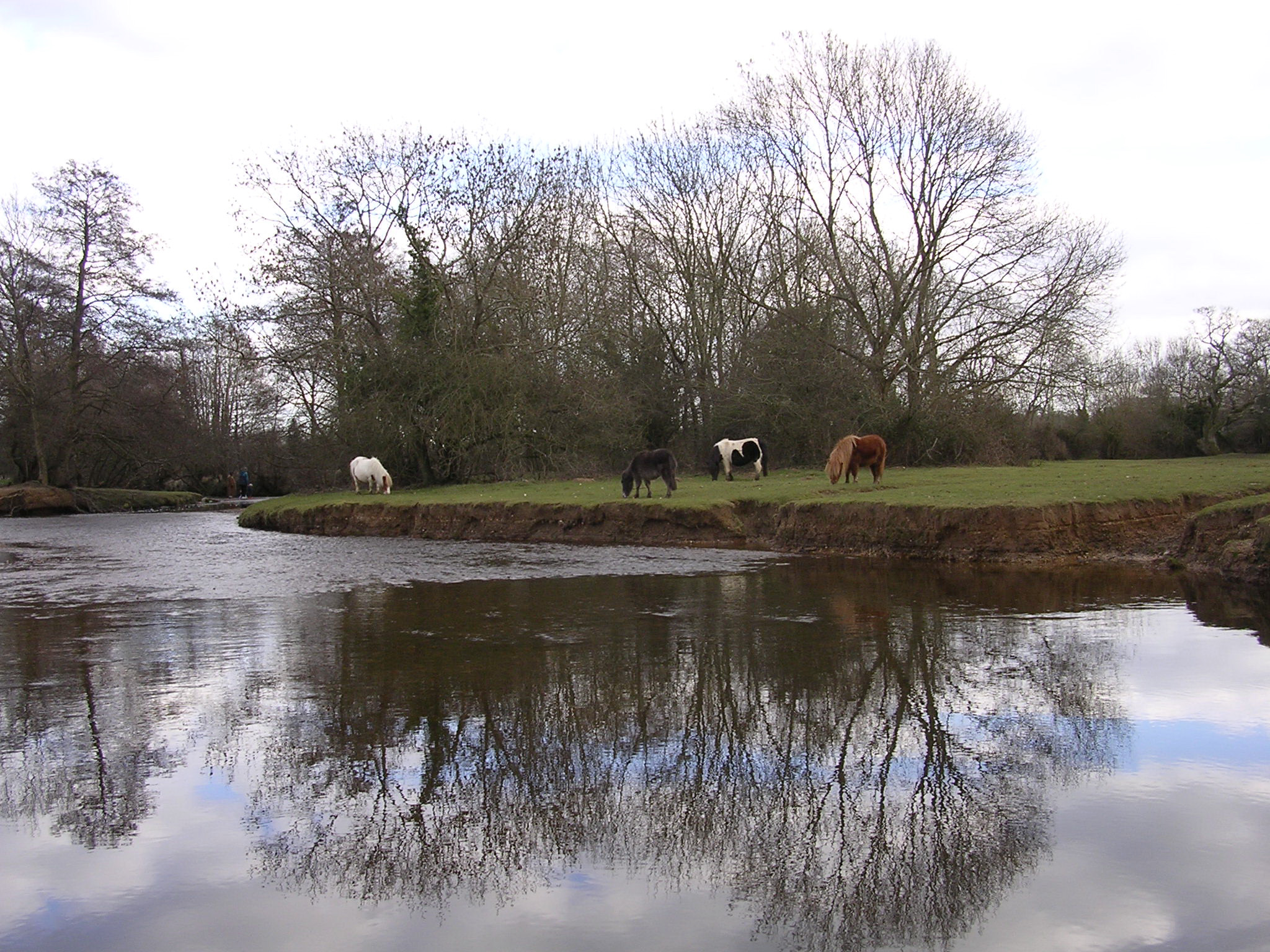
- New Forest ponies grazing next to the Lymington River near Brockenhurst

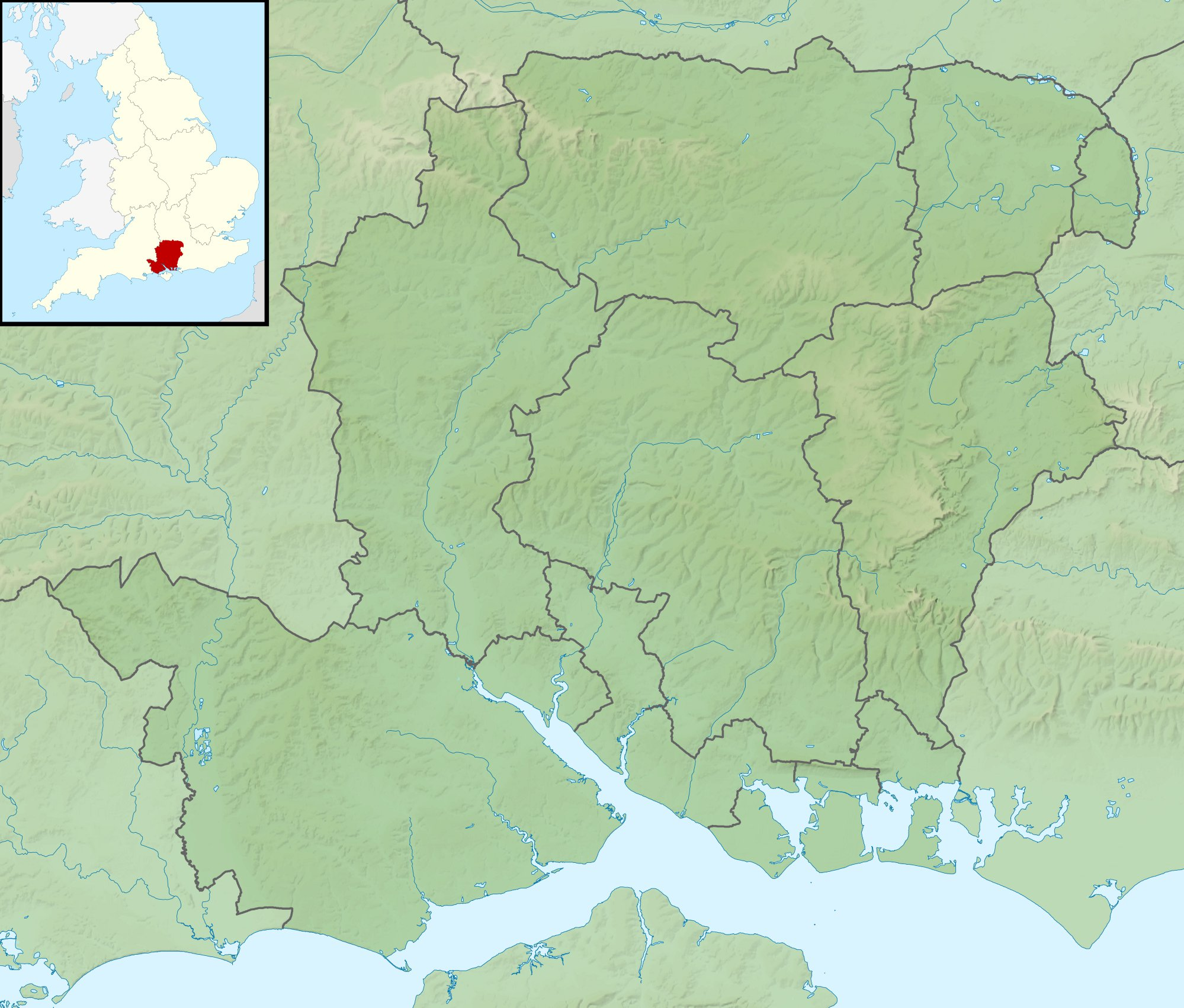
- The mouth in a Hampshire outline natural map.

Location
- Country: England
- Region: Hampshire
- District: New Forest

Physical characteristics
- Source
  - location: Ocknell Plain
  - coordinates: 50.912°N 1.656°W
  - elevation: 105 metres (344 ft)
- Mouth
  - location: Lymington
  - coordinates: 50.750°N 1.533°W
  - elevation: 0 metres
- Length: 22 km (14 mi)

Basin features
- Tributaries
  - left: Long Brook, Bagshot Gutter, Etherise Gutter
  - right: Warwickslade Cutting, Fletchers Water, Ober Water, Passford Water

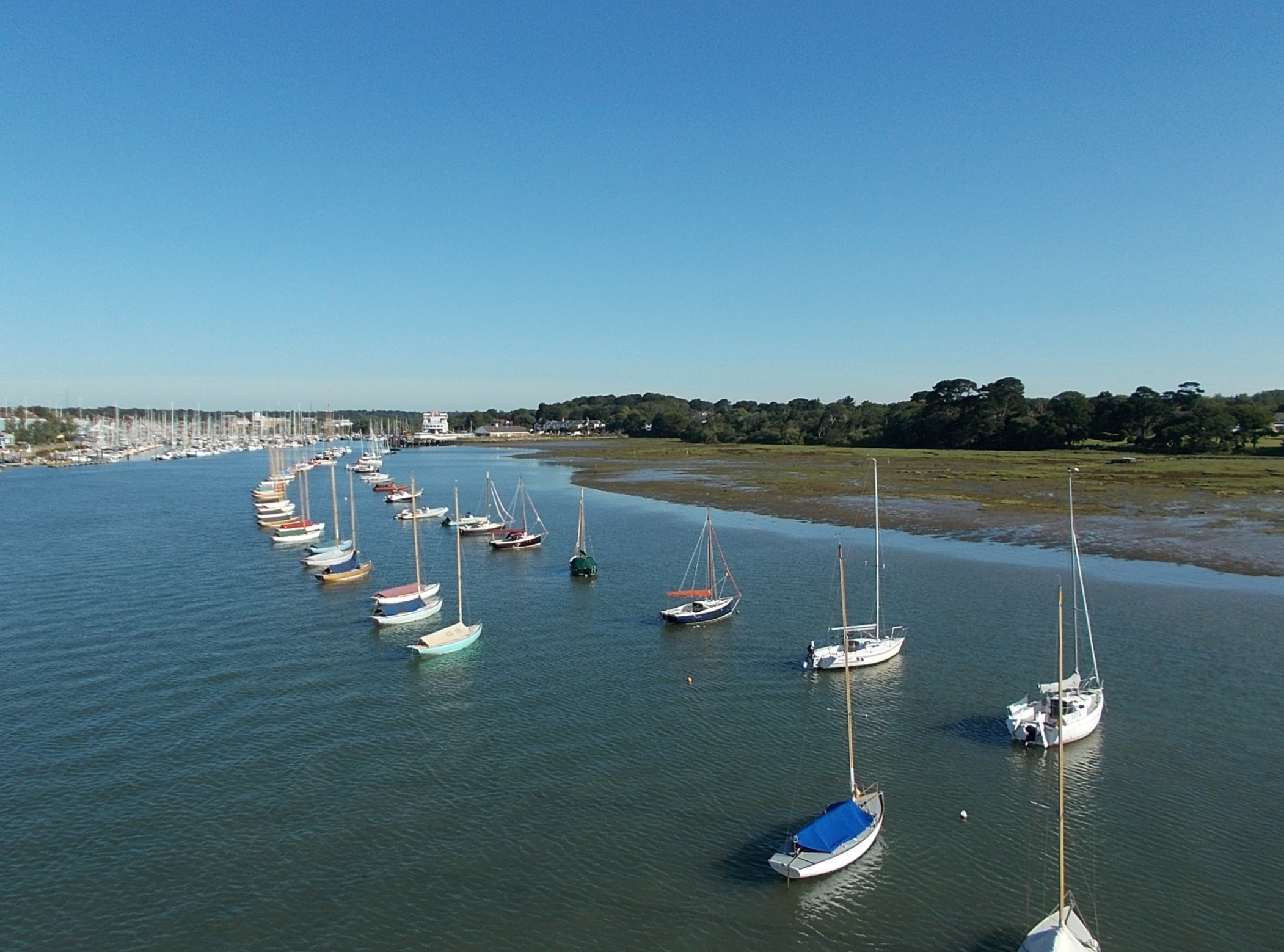
The river at its mouth, looking northwest towards the town of Lymington

The Lymington River drains part of the New Forest in Hampshire in southern England. Numerous headwaters to the west of Lyndhurst give rise to the river, including Highland Water, Bratley Water and Fletchers Water. From Brockenhurst the river runs southwards to the Solent at Lymington.

Highland Water rises north of the Ocknell Inclosure (SU243125) and flows for 10 km (6 mi) to Bolderford Bridge (SU291041) where it meets Ober Water. From there, it is known as the Lymington River and flows for a further 12 km (7 mi) to (SZ3493).

== History ==
In 1731 a merchant navy captain, Captain Cross, constructed a causeway and bridge across the estuary to the north of Lymington. He built toll houses and charged travellers using his causeway, more than a mile south of the existing bridge at Boldre. This impedes the river and further silted up Lymington harbour, losing its minor shipping rapidly. Lymington Corporation pursued the matter in court and lost their case.

In 1795 the mud building up in the estuary "has rendered it already very narrow; and will probably in a few years, so completely choke it up, as to make it unnavigable by any ships of considerable burden."

The causeway was taken over by the regional rail firm who collected the tolls until, after nationalised rail, it was bought out by Hampshire County Council in 1955 – tolls paid down the price and ceased a few years later. Today silting in the harbour as a result of the structure (almost a dam) occurs, but is ameliorated a higher sea level and the scouring effects of the Isle of Wight ferries. Before the structure it is said the diurnal tide influenced flow up to Brockenhurst.

Against the sea, the outer limit of the end of the estuary's mud at low tide is 550–650 metres closer to land than in 1895.

== Reedbeds ==
The river's extensive reedbeds are a Site of Special Scientific Interest.

== Water quality ==
The Environment Agency measure water quality of the river systems in England. Each is given an overall ecological status, which may be one of five levels: high, good, moderate, poor and bad. There are several components that are used to determine this, including biological status, which looks at the quantity and varieties of invertebrates, angiosperms and fish. Chemical status, which compares the concentrations of various chemicals against known safe concentrations, is rated good or fail.

Water quality of the Lymington River in 2019:

Section	Ecological Status	Chemical Status	Overall Status	Length	Catchment	Channel
Lymington River	Moderate	Fail	Moderate	21.928 km (13.625 mi)	49.376 km^{2} (19.064 sq mi)	Heavily modified
Highland Water	Moderate	Fail	Moderate	14.695 km (9.131 mi)	26.353 km^{2} (10.175 sq mi)	
Black Water	Good	Fail	Moderate	8.307 km (5.162 mi)	20.742 km^{2} (8.009 sq mi)	
Ober Water	Good	Fail	Moderate	14.706 km (9.138 mi)	22.781 km^{2} (8.796 sq mi)	

== See also ==
- Lymington and Keyhaven Marshes
- Hurst Castle and Lymington River Estuary
