= List of Sites of Special Scientific Interest in Hampshire =

List of protected wildlife and geological sites in Hampshire

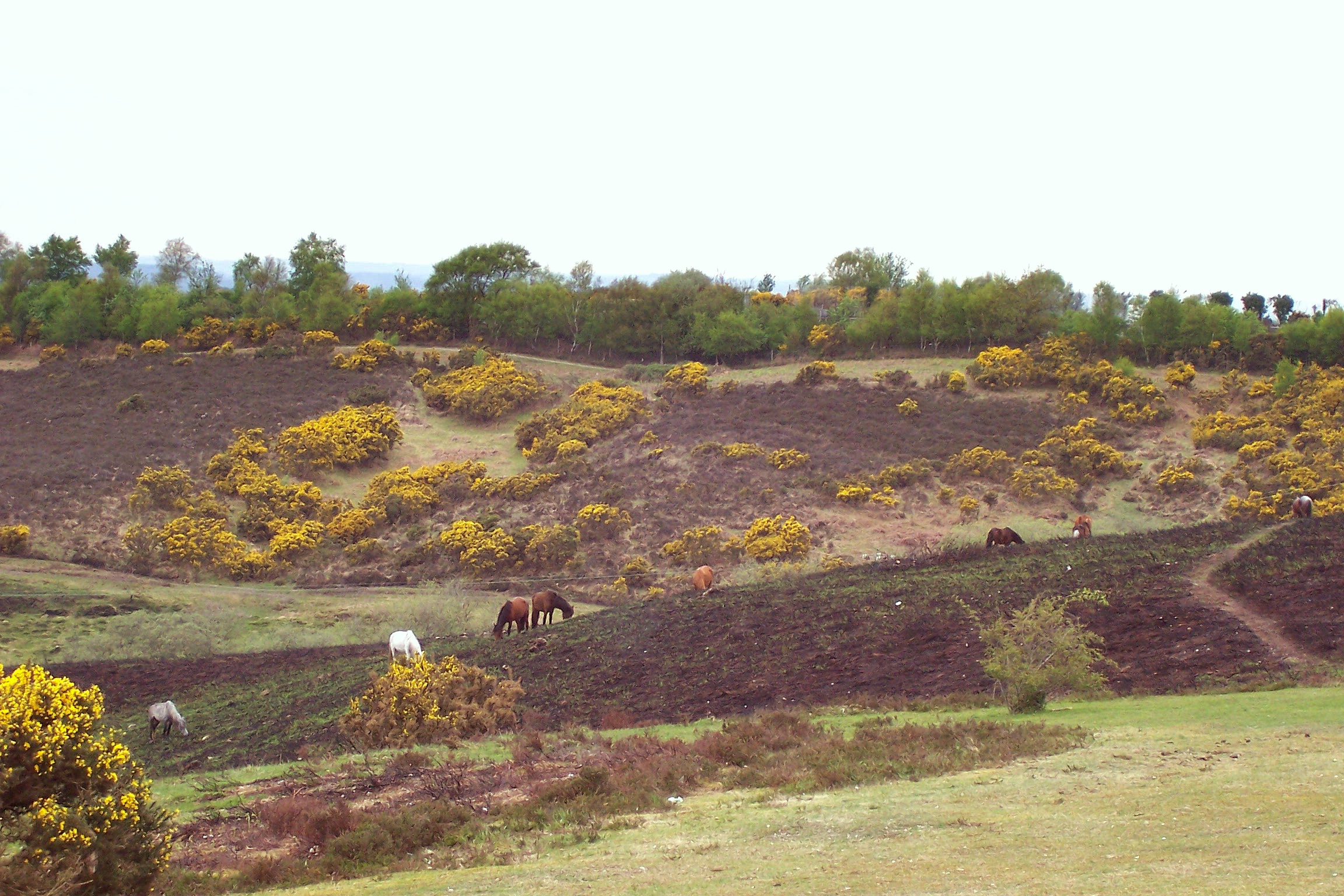
The New Forest

In England, Sites of Special Scientific Interest (SSSIs) are designated by Natural England, which is responsible for protecting England's natural environment. Designation as an SSSI gives legal protection to the most important wildlife and geological sites.

As of April 2020, there are 118 SSSIs in Hampshire, of which 107 are designated for their biological interest, 5 for their geological interest, and 6 for both interests.

== Key ==
=== Interest ===
- B = site of biological interest
- G = site of geological interest

=== Public access ===
- FP = access to footpaths through the site only
- No = no public access to site
- PP = public access to part of site
- Yes = public access to all or most of the site

=== Other classifications ===
- GCR = Geological Conservation Review site
- HIWWT = Hampshire and Isle of Wight Wildlife Trust
- LNR = Local nature reserve
- NCR = Nature Conservation Review site
- NNR = National nature reserve
- NT = National Trust
- Ramsar = Ramsar site, an internationally important wetland site
- RHPG = Register of Historic Parks and Gardens of Special Historic Interest in England
- SAC = Special Area of Conservation
- SM = Scheduled monument
- SPA = Special Protection Area under the European Union Directive on the Conservation of Wild Birds

== Sites ==
Site name	Photograph	B	G	Area (Note: The area and grid reference are taken from the "Details" page for each site on the Natural England database.)	Access	Location	Other	Map and Citation (Note: Citations are provided for each site by Natural England, and maps are provided on their Magic Map website.)	Description
Alresford Pond	Alresford Pond	✓		30.2 hectares (75 acres)	FP	Alresford; 51.094°N 1.157°W; SU 591 331		Map Citation	This large lake was created by Godfrey de Lucy, who was Bishop of Winchester between 1189 and 1204, to provide a reservoir of water to make the River Itchen navigable. The lake has a rich aquatic plant community and large populations of breeding wetland birds, such as reed warblers and sedge warblers.
Ashford Hill Woods and Meadows	Ashford Hill Meadows	✓		141.2 hectares (349 acres)	PP	Ashford Hill; 51.352°N 1.194°W; SU 562 617	NNR	Map Citation	This biologically rich site is a valley on London Clay and Lower Bagshot Beds. It has varied woodlands and agriculturally unimproved meadows. The diverse invertebrate fauna includes 31 species of butterflies and more than 400 species of moth, including the uncommon orange moth and pale oak eggar.
Avon Valley (Bickton to Christchurch)	Avon Valley	✓		1,403.8 hectares (3,469 acres)	PP	Ringwood; 50.883°N 1.794°W; SU 146 026	HIWWT, NCR, Ramsar, SAC, SPA	Map (Note: This site is partly in Dorset.) Citation	This valley has more diverse habitats and a wider range of fauna and flora than any other chalk valley in the country. There are internationally important numbers of breeding and wintering birds, such as Bewick’s swans and gadwalls. The flora include a number of nationally rare species and the river has a diverse fish fauna. Dragonflies include the rare scarce chaser.
Baddesley Common	Baddesley Common	✓		39.0 hectares (96 acres)	PP	Romsey; 50.991°N 1.439°W; SU 395 214	HIWWT, SAC	Map Citation	Most of this site is valley bog, together with damp grassland, heath and woods. The bog is not grazed and it has a rich flora and fauna, including many moths. Plants include reed, marsh cinquefoil and bog bean. There is also an area of acidic grassland with a rich flora.
Basingstoke Canal	Basingstoke Canal and towpath	✓		101.3 hectares (250 acres)	PP	Farnborough; 51.277°N 0.778°W; SU 855 538	NCR	Map (Note: This site is partly in Surrey.) Citation	This is the most botanically rich aquatic area in England and flora include hairlike pondweed and tasteless water-pepper, both of which are nationally scarce. The site is also nationally important for its invertebrates. There are 24 species of dragonfly and other species include two nationally rare Red Data Book insects.
Beacon Hill, Warnford	Beacon Hill	✓		46.4 hectares (115 acres)	YES	Winchester; 51.001°N 1.142°W; SU 603 227	NCR, NNR, SM	Map Citation	This spur of chalk grassland over the Meon Valley is managed by rabbit grazing. It has a rich herb flora, with species such as horseshoe vetch, yellow-wort and clustered bellflower. Twenty-five species of butterfly are known to breed on the site, including the rare silver-spotted skipper and Duke of Burgundy.
Bentley Station Meadow	Bentley Station Meadow	✓		5.2 hectares (13 acres)	FP	Farnham; 51.180°N 0.867°W; SU 793 429		Map Citation	This area of unimproved herb-rich grassland is dominated by cock’s-foot, Yorkshire fog and tufted hairgrass. There is a very rich invertebrate fauna, especially hoverflies and butterflies. Hoverflies include the uncommon Sphaerophoria taeniata and Xanthogramma citrofasiatum, while there are 22 species of breeding butterflies.
Bere Mill Meadows	Bere Mill Meadows	✓		10.3 hectares (25 acres)	FP	Whitchurch; 51.227°N 1.320°W; SU 476 477		Map Citation	These damp meadows in the flood plain of the River Test have a network of ditches with plants such as floating sweet-grass and lesser water-parsnip. The meadows have a rich variety of wet grassland herbs, including bogbean, ragged-robin, water avens, marsh valerian and southern marsh orchid.
Binswood	Binswood	✓		62.5 hectares (154 acres)	YES	Alton; 51.127°N 0.910°W; SU 764 370		Map Citation	This is a small surviving part of the Royal Forest of Woolmer. It is mainly unimproved grassland with scattered trees and areas of dense woodland, and the oldest trees may be 200 years old. It is still managed as a wood with common rights of grazing, and actively managed wood pasture is now a rare habitat.
Blackwater Valley	Blackwater Valley	✓		33.9 hectares (84 acres)	PP	Sandhurst; 51.337°N 0.785°W; SU847605		Map (Note: This site is partly in Berkshire.) Citation	The River Blackwater runs through the site, which also has wet valley alder wood, swamp and alluvial meadows. The meadows have several species of flora associated with ancient grassland and they are a nationally rare and threatened habitat. An area of deciduous woodland has the rare sedge, Carex elongata.
Botley Wood and Everett's and Mushes Copses	Botley Wood	✓		352.7 hectares (872 acres)	PP	Winchester; 50.888°N 1.232°W; SU 541 101		Map Citation	Botley Wood is nationally outstanding for butterflies, with more than 30 breeding species, including pearl-bordered fritillary, white-letter hairstreak, dark green fritillary and purple emperor. Everett’s and Mushes Copses have a rich flora, with over fifty species of flowering plants typical of ancient woodlands.
Boulsbury Wood	Boulsbury Wood	✓		119.8 hectares (296 acres)	FP	Damerham; 50.942°N 1.902°W; SU 070 158		Map Citation	This site consists of parts of Boulsbury Wood, High Wood, Stone Hill Wood, Martin Wood and Blagdon Hill Wood. It has diverse habitats and flora, and Boulsbury Wood is the most species-rich wood in the county. Some parts are ancient woodland, with records dating from the thirteenth century.
Bourley and Long Valley	Bourley and Long Valley	✓		823.5 hectares (2,035 acres)	PP	Fleet; 51.255°N 0.806°W; SU 834 513	SPA	Map Citation	This site has varied habitats, with heath, woodland, scrub, mire and grassland. The heathland is important for three vulnerable birds, woodlarks, nightjars and Dartford warblers. There is a rich invertebrate fauna, including the nationally scarce Eumenes coarctatus potter wasp, silver-studded blue butterfly and downy emerald dragonfly.
Bramshill	Bramshill	✓		673.3 hectares (1,664 acres)	FP	Hook; 51.339°N 0.905°W; SU 764 606	SPA	Map Citation	This site has a conifer plantation with internationally important populations of woodlarks, nightjars and Dartford warblers. There are also several pools and mires, which have large populations of dragonflies and damselflies, together with an unimproved meadow which provides a habitat for a nationally rare flowering plant, small fleabane.
Bramshott and Ludshott Commons	Ludshott Common	✓		374.4 hectares (925 acres)	PP	Liphook; 51.104°N 0.782°W; SU 854 346	SPA	Map Citation	The site has large areas of heath which are dominated by heather, bell heather, common gorse and dwarf gorse. There are also woodland areas with ancient trees, with at least 87 taxa of epiphytic lichens, most of which are associated with ancient woods and several of which are rare.
Bransbury Common	Bransbury Common	✓		158.6 hectares (392 acres)	PP	Wherwell; 51.171°N 1.414°W; SU 411 415	NCR	Map Citation	This site has two different habitats. The soil of the common is peat over gravel, and the dominant plants are purple moor-grass and greater tussock-sedge. There is also a former water meadow, which has flowering plants including lady's smock, marsh marigold and early marsh-orchid.
Breamore Marsh		✓		14.8 hectares (37 acres)		Breamore; 50.960°N 1.781°W; SU 155 179		Map Citation	
Brickworth Down and Dean Hill		✓		120.4 hectares (298 acres)		Salisbury; 51.030°N 1.658°W; SU 241 257		Map (Note: This site is partly in Wiltshire) Citation	
Brockley Warren		✓		13.0 hectares (32 acres)		Chilbolton; 51.129°N 1.403°W; SU 419 368		Map Citation	
Broughton Down	Broughton Down	✓		45.8 hectares (113 acres)	PP	Nether Wallop; 51.096°N 1.589°W; SU 289 330	HIWWT	Map Citation	This sloping site on chalk has grassland which is grazed by rabbits and has many anthills. There are also areas of scrub and mature woodland. Insects include silver-spotted skipper, Duke of Burgundy fritillary and Essex skipper butterflies and chalk carpet moths.
Browndown	Browndown	✓		66.5 hectares (164 acres)	YES	Gosport; 50.789°N 1.181°W; SZ 578 991		Map Citation	This is a shingle beach owned by the Ministry of Defence, which has areas of heather, grass heath and gorse. There are a range of invertebrates specialising in these habitats, including 90 flies, 60 aculeata and 83 true bugs, including the rare Dalman's leatherbug.
Broxhead and Kingsley Commons	Broxhead Common	✓		105.1 hectares (260 acres)	YES	Whitehill; 51.133°N 0.858°W; SU 800 377	LNR, SPA	Map Citation	These commons have areas of heath, acid grassland, woodland and scrub. The site is one of the most important in southern Britain for lichens, with more than 25 terricolous species, and there are also three protected birds, 25 rare bees, wasps and ants, and the nationally rare sand lizard.
Burghclere Beacon	Burghclere Beacon	✓		80.7 hectares (199 acres)	YES	Burghclere; 51.310°N 1.344°W; SU 458 570	NCR, SM	Map Citation	There is an Iron Age hillfort at the top of this chalk grassland site. There is a rich variety of herbs, including lady's bedstraw, bird's-foot trefoil, fairy flax, creeping thistle, hedge bedstraw, horseshoe vetch and felwort.
Burton Common	Burton Common	✓		39.1 hectares (97 acres)	YES	Christchurch; 50.758°N 1.728°W; SZ 193 954		Map Citation	This dry heath has over-mature heather with a rich bryophyte and lichen flora. There are populations of sand lizards and smooth snakes, both of which are species associated with mature dry heathland. There are also areas of deciduous woodland along the banks of a stream and of Scots pine.
Butser Hill	Butser Hill	✓	✓	239.7 hectares (592 acres)	YES	Waterlooville; 50.794°N 0.984°W; SU 714 199	GCR, LNR, NNR, SAC, SM	Map Citation	This chalk hill is part of Queen Elizabeth Country Park. It has areas of dense yew woodland, mixed scrub and grassland which is grazed by sheep and rabbits. There is a rich flora, especially bryophytes.
Butter Wood	Butter Wood	✓		133.0 hectares (329 acres)	PP	Basingstoke; 51.264°N 0.978°W; SU 714 522	LNR	Map Citation	This site is mainly deciduous woodland with a diverse geology and structure. Most of it is former wood pasture, with many glades and broad bridleways, and there are also several copses which were managed as coppice with standards. Fauna include a rich Lepidoptera, including 25 species of butterfly.
Castle Bottom to Yateley and Hawley Commons	Yateley Common	✓		922.7 hectares (2,280 acres)	PP	Camberley; 51.231°N 0.828°W; SU 818 586	NNR, SPA	Map Citation	This site of heathland and conifer plantation has an internationally important population of Dartford warbler and populations of two other protected birds, woodlark and nightjar. It also has an outstanding assemblage of dragonflies and damselflies, with 19 out of the 37 British species. Other invertebrates include the nationally rare conopid fly, Myopa fasciata.
Catherington Down	Catherington Down	✓		12.8 hectares (32 acres)	YES	Waterlooville; 50.924°N 1.018°W; SU 691 143	LNR	Map Citation	This western sloping site is chalk grassland with prominent lynchet strips dating to the Middle Ages. It is managed by grazing and has a variety of chalk herbs, such as pyramidal orchid, round-headed rampion and autumn lady's-tresses. There is also a narrow belt of woodland.
Cheesefoot Head	Cheesefoot Head	✓		13.4 hectares (33 acres)	YES	Winchester; 51.050°N 1.249°W; SU 528 281		Map Citation	The SSSI is a steeply sloping area of chalk grassland, which is grazed by cattle and rabbits. There is a full range of downland grass species, especially fescues and bents. Herbs include dwarf thistle and fragrant orchid.
Chichester Harbour	Chichester Harbour	✓		3,733.5 hectares (9,226 acres)	PP	Chichester; 50.809°N 0.916°W; SU 765 016	GCR LNR NCR Ramsar SAC SPA	Map (Note: This site is partly in West Sussex.) Citation	The harbour has diverse habitats, including intertidal mudflats, shingle, saltmarsh, sand dunes, marshes and woodland. The mudflats provide feeding grounds for internationally important numbers of ringed plovers, grey plovers, redshanks, black-tailed godwits, dunlins, sanderlings, curlews and greenshanks. There are geologically important sand dunes and shingles at East Head and east of Langstone.
Chilbolton Common	Chilbolton Common	✓		35.5 hectares (88 acres)	PP	Stockbridge; 51.157°N 1.449°W; SU 386 399		Map Citation	This site comprises a stretch of the River Test and its neighbouring flood plain. Habitats include marshy meadows, fenn, willow carr and chalk downland. The flora is rich and diverse, with more than 265 species of flowering plant recorded, such as marsh arrowgrass, bog pimpernel, adders-tongue fern and early marsh-orchid.
Coombe Wood and The Lythe	Coombe Wood and The Lythe	✓		44.0 hectares (109 acres)	PP	Alton; 51.105°N 0.933°W; SU 748 345	NT, SAC	Map Citation	This site has woods on Wealden Upper Greensand with a rich bryophyte flora and calcareous ground flora, especially green hellebore and violet helleborine. There are also meadows bordering a stream and an oak and hazel wood on Gault clay.
Coulters Dean	Coulters Dean	✓		2.2 hectares (5.4 acres)	PP	Petersfield; 50.966°N 0.938°W; SU 747 190	HIWWT	Map Citation	This is chalk grassland on a west facing slope of the South Downs. It has a rich flora and invertebrate fauna, which has been recorded periodically since 1914. Flowering plants include horseshoe vetch, rampion, clustered bellflower and at least eleven species of orchid.
Crab Wood	Crab Wood	✓		73.0 hectares (180 acres)	PP	Winchester; 51.064°N 1.382°W; SU 434 296	LNR	Map Citation	This site has been wooded at least since the sixteenth century. It has a hazel layer which has been coppiced, large oaks and some beech, ash and birch trees. There is a rich butterfly fauna, including purple emperors.
Danebury Hill	Danebury Hill	✓		13.7 hectares (34 acres)	YES	Stockbridge; 51.138°N 1.537°W; SU 325 377	LNR	Map Citation	This gently sloping site surrounds Danebury, which is a hill fort dating to the Iron Age. It has herb-rich chalk grassland which is grazed by rabbits and sheep, and there are also areas of mixed and juniper scrub. Flowering plants include the scarce burnt-tip orchid, field fleawort and frog orchid.
Dibden Bay	Dibden Bay	✓		229.4 hectares (567 acres)	YES	Southampton; 50.882°N 1.420°W; SU 409 093		Map Citation	Most of this site was formed by deposition of material dredged from Southampton Water. It has been designated an SSSI because it has a nationally important collection of invertebrates, including 21 species which are nationally rare and another 67 which are nationally scarce. The site is also important because of its nesting lapwings, and there are wintering wildfowl such as wigeon, teal, pintail and mallard.
Downend Chalk Pit			✓	4.4 hectares (11 acres)		Fareham; 50.855°N 1.149°W; SU 600 065	GCR	Map Citation	
Dunbridge Pit			✓	0.7 hectares (1.7 acres)		Romsey; 51.030°N 1.551°W; SU 316 257	GCR	Map Citation	
Duncroft Farm Pit	Duncroft Farm Pit		✓	0.1 hectares (0.25 acres)	NO	Newbury; 51.328°N 1.318°W; SU 476 590	GCR	Map Citation	This site exposes beds dating to the Upper Chalk of the Late Cretaceous epoch, 100 to 66 million years ago. The strata are in the middle of the Kingsclere Monocline, a steep fold which is thought to be due to later movement in the underlying rocks.
East Aston Common	East Aston Common	✓		18.2 hectares (45 acres)	PP	Andover; 51.202°N 1.364°W; SU 445 450		Map Citation	This site in the flood plain of the River Test is part of one of the finest chalk stream habitats in Britain. It has alluvial meadows with a rich variety of herbs, areas of tall fen and a wide and shallow stretch of the river. There are many wetland birds, such as grasshopper warblers, water rails and reed bunting.
Ebblake Bog	Ebblake Bog	✓		11.3 hectares (28 acres)	PP	Ringwood; 50.862°N 1.852°W; SU 105 070	Ramsar, SAC, SPA	Map Citation	This mire in the valley of the Moors River has a deep layer of peat. It has a different ecology from similar mires in the New Forest because, unlike them, it has not been grazed. It is dominated by willow, bog myrtle, purple moor grass and Sphagnum mosses and there are several shallow pools.
Eelmoor Marsh	Eelmoor Marsh	✓		66.3 hectares (164 acres)	PP	Aldershot; 51.274°N 0.797°W; SU 840 534	SPA	Map Citation	This site has a bog with deep peat, grass heath, woodland and a network of ditches. The bog has more than 250 species of flowering plants and grasses, including the insectivorous common butterwort, pale butterwort, small bladderwort and common sundew. There is also a diverse invertebrate fauna.
Eling and Bury Marshes	Eling and Bury Marshes	✓		112.3 hectares (277 acres)	PP	Southampton; 50.909°N 1.469°W; SU 374 123	Ramsar, SAC, SPA	Map Citation	This site is composed of two dissimilar saltmarshes which are separated by intertidal mudflats. Eling Great Marsh is grazed and has a close sward, while Bury Marsh is ungrazed and has a more diverse flora. The site is part of Southampton Water, a tidal estuary which is nationally important for its populations of waders.
Fleet Pond	Fleet Pond	✓		48.3 hectares (119 acres)	YES	Fleet; 51.288°N 0.824°W; SU 821 550	LNR	Map Citation	This large and shallow lake is surrounded by reed beds, alder carr and oak and birch woodland. The lake has a rich aquatic flora and fauna, including large populations of reed warblers and other wetland birds.
Fletchwood Meadows		✓	"	7.6 hectares (19 acres)		Southampton; 50.900°N 1.519°W; SU 339 113	HIWWT	Map Citation	
Foxlease and Ancells Meadows	Foxlease and Ancells Meadows	✓		68.8 hectares (170 acres)	PP	Fleet; 51.302°N 0.811°W; SU 830 565	HIWWT	Map Citation	This site is mainly composed of species-rich meadows, which are damp and acidic. There also many ponds and ditches which have a diverse flora, including water violet and the nationally declining marsh stitchwort. Over 240 species of plants have been recorded, including 17 sedges.
Galley Down Wood	Galley Down Wood	✓		16.6 hectares (41 acres)	FP	Winchester; 50.968°N 1.185°W; SU 573 190		Map Citation	This wood, which was planted with beech trees in around 1930, has a well developed beech flora. Flowering plants include bird's-nest orchid, white helleborine, greater butterfly-orchid, common spotted orchid and the nationally rare long-leaved helleborine.
Gilkicker Lagoon		✓		4.1 hectares (10 acres)		Gosport; 50.776°N 1.139°W; SZ 608 977	Ramsar, SAC	Map Citation	
Greywell Fen	Greywell Fen	✓		38.0 hectares (94 acres)	PP	Hook; 51.252°N 0.971°W; SU 719 508	HIWWT, NCR	Map Citation	This 2-kilometre (1.2-mile) long site is calcareous fen. There is a large area of wet grassland, which is grazed by cattle, and a small area of carr woodland. Meadow flora include cowslip, dyer's greenweed and pepper-saxifrage.
Greywell Tunnel	Greywell Tunnel	✓		0.4 hectares (0.99 acres)	NO	Hook; 51.259°N 0.980°W; SU 713 516		Map Citation	This tunnel in the Basingstoke Canal has a stable microclimate as a result of a roof fall in 1932, making it suitable for occupation by bats. It has the largest known population of any site in Britain, estimated at 2,000. There are at least five species, Natterer's, Daubenton’s, whiskered, brown long-eared and Brandt's.
Hazeley Heath	Hazeley Heath	✓		180.8 hectares (447 acres)	YES	Hook; 51.318°N 0.919°W; SU 754 582	SPA	Map Citation	This large heath has a variety of habitats due to variations in soil, topography and land use. These include areas of acid grassland, bracken, purple moor-grass, dry and wet heath, dense gorse, birch woods and bog.
Heath Brow			✓	1.9 hectares (4.7 acres)		Farnham; 51.237°N 0.824°W; SU 822 493	GCR	Map Citation	
Highclere Park	Highclere Park	✓		69.6 hectares (172 acres)	YES	Newbury; 51.339°N 1.350°W; SU 454 602	RHPG	Map Citation	This is the earliest documented estate in the county, recorded in 749, and it was landscaped by Capability Brown in around 1770. The mature trees have a rich and diverse lichen and moss flora, with many species typical of ancient woodland. There are two lakes, which were originally fishponds of the Bishop of Winchester, and they are bordered by areas of swamp and fen. There are also areas of grassland and the site is notable for its rich invertebrate populations.
Highcliffe to Milford Cliffs	Highcliffe to Milford Cliffs		✓	110.1 hectares (272 acres)	YES	New Milton; 50.733°N 1.663°W; SZ 239 926	GCR	Map Citation	This site stretches along the cliffs of Christchurch Bay for 9-kilometre (5.6-mile). It exposes the fossil rich strata of the Barton Beds and Headon Beds, dating to the Eocene epoch around 40 million years ago, and is the type locality for many species of fauna and flora. The Barton Beds are capped by Pleistocene gravels which are rich in Paleolithic artefacts.
Hook Common and Bartley Heath	Hook Common	✓		129.4 hectares (320 acres)	YES	Hook; 51.274°N 0.965°W; SU 723 533	HIWWT	Map Citation	This site is of particular interest because of its extensive areas of wet heath, which rarely survives in the Thames Basin. There are also areas of dry heath and oak and birch woodland. There is a rich invertebrate assemblage, including the Red Data Book moths Stenoptila graphodactyla and Idaea dilutaria, and the hoverfly Microdon mutabilis.
Hook Heath Meadows		✓		5.9 hectares (15 acres)		Portsmouth; 50.868°N 1.086°W; SU 644 080	HIWWT	Map Citation	
Hurst Castle and Lymington River Estuary	Hurst Castle and Lymington River Estuary	✓	✓	1,077.3 hectares (2,662 acres)	PP	Lymington; 50.736°N 1.532°W; SZ 331 930	GCR, HIWWT, LNR, NCR, NNR Ramsar, SAC, SPA	Map Citation	This site has a diverse range of coastal habitats, including intertidal muds, lagoons, fresh, brackish and salt marshes, estuaries and shingle ridges. It is internationally important for wintering wildfowl, and invertebrates include eight nationally rare species. It is geologically important as the basis of a seminal paper explaining the relationship of beach alignment to the direction of dominant waves.
Hythe to Calshot Marshes	Calshot Marshes	✓		591.8 hectares (1,462 acres)	PP	Southampton; 50.845°N 1.354°W; SU 456 052	HIWWT, LNR, Ramsar, SAC, SPA	Map Citation	These areas of saltmarsh and mudflats have nationally important numbers of wintering waders and wildfowl, such as black-tailed godwit, grey plover and dunlin. The site is internationally important for dark-bellied brent geese as it has over 1% of the world population. The benthic zone has a dense concentration of invertebrates which provide the birds' main food.
Ladle Hill	Ladle Hill	✓		10.5 hectares (26 acres)	YES	Newbury; 51.308°N 1.317°W; SU 477 568	SM	Map Citation	This site on the slopes and ramparts of an Iron Age hill fort is chalk grassland with a rich variety of flora. It is one of only about six sites in Britain which has the burnt-tip orchid, and other flowering plants include hairy rock-cress and chalk milkwort.
Langstone Harbour	Langstone Harbour	✓		2,085.4 hectares (5,153 acres)	PP	Portsmouth; 50.818°N 1.015°W; SU 695 025	HIWWT, LNR, NCR, Ramsar, SAC, SPA	Map Citation	This is a tidal basin and at low water large areas of mudflats are exposed. It is internationally important for its large numbers of wintering wildfowl and waders, and for its many intertidal invertebrates. It has been the subject of important ecological research on its algae and invertebrates.
Lee-on-The Solent to Itchen Estuary	Lee-on-The Solent to Itchen Estuary	✓	✓	585.9 hectares (1,448 acres)	PP	Southampton; 50.851°N 1.310°W; SU 487 059	GCR, LNR, Ramsar, SAC, SM, SPA	Map Citation	This site is mainly intertidal muds, and there are also areas of saltmarsh, vegetated shingle, reedbeds, deciduous woodland and marshy grassland. It is outstanding for nationally scarce coastal plants, internationally important for dark-bellied geese, and nationally important for eight other species of birds, including great crested grebe and ringed plover. The site is also important for Palaeolithic artefacts and the fossils of Eocene birds.
Lincegrove and Hackett's Marshes	Lincegrove and Hackett's Marshes	✓		37.8 hectares (93 acres)	PP	Fareham; 50.876°N 1.309°W; SU 487 087	LNR, Ramsar, SAC, SPA	Map Citation	This site is one of the best examples of saltmarshes on the south coast. It is dominated by sea purslane and common cordgrass, with other flora including sea lavender, thrift, sea aster and sea clubrush.
Lower Test Valley	Lower Test Valley	✓		142.0 hectares (351 acres)	PL	Southampton; 50.928°N 1.483°W; SU 364 144	HIWWT, Ramsar, SAC, SPA	Map Citation	The valley has extensive reed beds, tidally flooded creeks, unimproved grassland and scattered willow trees. More than 450 flowering plants have been recorded, including the nationally rare green-flowered helleborine. The reed beds have large populations of wetland breed birds.
Lye Heath Marsh		✓		4.4 hectares (11 acres)		Winchester; 50.872°N 1.080°W; SU 648 085		Map Citation	
Lymington River	Lymington River	✓	✓	34.8 hectares (86 acres)	PP	Brockenhurst; 50.812°N 1.576°W; SU 300 015	GCR, NCR, Ramsar, SPA	Map Citation	This site covers the river and its tributaries Highland Water, Ober Water and Mill Lawn Brook, and no other system in England shows such a rapid succession of plant communities in such a short stretch of river. Ober Water has a very unusual and diverse flora and several rare and protected species of dragonfly. Highland Water is important for illustrating fluvial processes in rivers in southern England which have not been subject to modification.
Lymington River Reedbeds	Lymington River Reedbeds	✓		41.7 hectares (103 acres)	YES	Lymington; 50.770°N 1.543°W; SZ 323 968	HIWWT, Ramsar, SPA	Map Citation	This site in the Lymington River estuary was formerly tidal, but salt water has been excluded since the nineteenth century by a one way tide flap. It has reedbeds and unimproved grassland which provide an important habitat for breeding and migrating birds. The reedbeds have large populations of aphids, which provide food for the birds.
Mapledurwell Fen		✓		0.4 hectares (0.99 acres)		Basingstoke; 51.266°N 1.031°W; SU 677 523	HIWWT	Map Citation	
Martin and Tidpit Downs	Martin and Tidpit Downs	✓		367.5 hectares (908 acres)	YES	Salisbury; 50.973°N 1.934°W; SU 047 193	NCR, NNR, SM	Map Citation	This site is rich in prehistoric earthworks, including Bokerley Dyke. It has chalk grassland, heath and scrub, with a rich herb flora. Sheep grazing is increasing the botanical quality of the grassland. There is an outstanding assemblage of butterflies, with 36 species recorded, including marbled white, dark green fritillary, silver-spotted skipper and Duke of Burgundy.
Micheldever Spoil Heaps	Micheldever Spoil Heaps	✓		32.1 hectares (79 acres)	YES	Basingstoke; 51.196°N 1.257°W; SU 520 444		Map Citation	This site is composed of spoil heaps from nineteenth-century railway construction, and it is described by Natural England as "of quite exceptional botanical importance". Most species have colonised the site from nearby, but some from a distance, and the plant assemblage is in a state of flux, with many rareties. There are large populations of fly orchids.
Moorgreen Meadows	Moorgreen Meadows	✓		14.3 hectares (35 acres)	YES	Eastleigh; 50.929°N 1.314°W; SU 483 146		Map Citation	These meadows are important for their populations of the genus marsh orchid, especially the northern marsh orchid, which is not found at any other location in southern England. They grow close to four other marsh orchid species, early marsh-orchid, common spotted orchid, heath spotted-orchid and southern marsh orchid. Hybrids occur in every combination, making the site a centre of micro-evolution.
The Moors, Bishop's Waltham	The Moors, Bishop's Waltham	✓		28.0 hectares (69 acres)	PP	Winchester; 50.949°N 1.203°W; SU 561 169	LNR, NCR	Map Citation	These unimproved wet meadows and alder carr drain into Mill Pond at the centre of the site. The meadows have a rich and diverse flora, dominated by greater pond sedge in wetter areas, while there are plants such as purple moor-grass and meadow foxtail in drier parts.
Mottisfont Bats	Mottisfont Bats	✓		196.7 hectares (486 acres)	PP	Romsey; 51.051°N 1.555°W; SU 313 280	SAC	Map Citation	These woods have a nationally important population of the rare barbastelle bat. It is one of only six breeding sites in Britain. Eight other bat species have been recorded at Mottisfont: whiskered, brown long-eared, common and soprano Pipistrelles, serotine, noctule, Daubenton's and Natterer's.
New Forest	New Forest	✓	✓	28,924.5 hectares (71,474 acres)	PP	Lyndhurst; 50.864°N 1.619°W; SU 269 072	GCR, HIWWT, NCR, NNR, NT, SAC, Ramsar, SPA	Map Citation	The New Forest has the largest area of wild vegetation in lowland England, and it is large enough to ensure the long-term survival of fauna and flora, including many rare species. Habitats include heath, mire, fen, pasture woodland and bog woodland. There are seven important geological sites dating to the Cenozoic, including gravels rich in Paleolithic artefacts.
Noar Hill	Noar Hill	✓		63.0 hectares (156 acres)	PP	Alton; 51.080°N 0.941°W; SU 743 317	HIWWT, NCR, SAC	Map Citation	The hill has a variety of chalk habitats, including grassland over ancient quarries, mature beech woodland, scrub and hazel coppice. The site is nationally important for butterflies and grasshoppers. Forty species of butterfly have been recorded, including the declining Duke of Burgundy and brown hairstreak.
Norley Copse and Meadow	Norley Copse and Meadow	✓		7.5 hectares (19 acres)	NO	Lymington; 50.779°N 1.487°W; SZ 363 978	Ramsar, SPA	Map Citation	The Crockford Stream runs through this site, which has old oak woodland with hazel coppice and unimproved grassland which is managed by grazing. The meadow has 140 species of higher plants and it is also rich in invertebrates, including eight species of dragonfly and a rare picture-winged fly, Sphenella marginata.
North Solent	North Solent	✓	✓	1,186.6 hectares (2,932 acres)	PP	Southampton; 50.792°N 1.396°W; SZ 427 993	GCR, LNR, NCR, NNR Ramsar, SAC, SPA	Map Citation	This site has diverse habitats, including mudflats, saltmarshes, beaches, marshes, grassland and woods. It has rich insect populations and is of international importance for its wintering and migratory wildfowl and waders. Stone Point is important for studies of Quaternary stratigraphy, and it has many fossils dating to the Eemian interglacial, around 120,000 years ago.
Odiham Common with Bagwell Green and Shaw	Odiham Common	✓		133.8 hectares (331 acres)	PP	Hook; 51.269°N 0.922°W; SU 753 528		Map Citation	Odiham Common was used for hunting by Edward the Confessor and is now wood pasture. Dead wood provides a habitat for nationally rare flies. There are also areas of dry grassland, which has rare solitary bees and wasps, and of marshy grassland.
Old Burghclere Lime Quarry		✓		4.5 hectares (11 acres)		Newbury; 51.313°N 1.326°W; SU 471 573	HIWWT	Map Citation	
Old Winchester Hill	Old Winchester Hill	✓		66.2 hectares (164 acres)	YES	Petersfield; 50.983°N 1.087°W; SU 642 208	NCR, NNR, SM	Map Citation	The south slope of this Iron Age hillfort is one of the richest botanical sites in southern England, including the largest population of round-headed rampion in Britain. Other plants include greater butterfly-orchids, yellow-worts, autumn lady's-tresses, and 5% of the juniper trees in southern England.
Pamber Forest and Silchester Common	Pamber Forest	✓		341.7 hectares (844 acres)	YES	Tadley; 51.347°N 1.117°W; SU 616 612	HIWWT, LNR	Map Citation	Pamber Forest has hazel coppice dominated by oak standards. At the southern end are plants associated with ancient woodland, such as orpine, wood horsetail, lily of the valley, wild daffodil and the rare mountain fern. The woodland has over forty nationally rare or uncommon species.
Peake Wood	Peake Wood	✓		17.7 hectares (44 acres)	NO	East Meon; 50.990°N 1.091°W; SU 639 216		Map Citation	This is a prime example of a hazel and ash wood on calcareous soils. There is also a variety of other trees and a rich herb layer, which is dominated by bluebell and dog's mercury. Other plants include the rare star-of-Bethlehem and fly orchid.
Poors Common		✓		47.4 hectares (117 acres)		Bransgore; 50.785°N 1.718°W; SZ 200 984		Map Citation	
Porton Down	Porton Down	✓		1,559.0 hectares (3,852 acres)	PP	Salisbury; 51.131°N 1.669°W; SU 233 369	NCR, SAC, SPA	Map Citation	This is one of the largest areas of semi-natural chalk grassland in the country. It has also been designated an SSSI because of its important populations of lichens, vascular plants and invertebrates, and for its breeding stone curlews. There are also areas of scrub and woodland.
Portsdown	Portsdown	✓		69.1 hectares (171 acres)	YES	Portsmouth; 50.854°N 1.092°W; SU 640 065		Map Citation	This is a linear south-facing escarpment with a rich chalk grassland flora. The diverse insect fauna includes all the chalk downland butterflies and a population of the largest British bush cricket, Tettigonia viridissima. On the lower slopes, raised beaches indicate former sea levels.
Portsmouth Harbour	Portsmouth Harbour	✓		1,264.2 hectares (3,124 acres)	PP	Portsmouth; 50.827°N 1.125°W; SU 617 034	Ramsar, SPA	Map Citation	Most of the harbour is composed of intertidal mudflats and cordgrass marshes, and they have abundant benthic fauna which provide food for birds. It is of national importance for dark-bellied Brent geese and for three species of waders, grey plover, black-tailed godwit and dunlin.
Quarley Hill Fort	Quarley Hill Fort	✓		3.5 hectares (8.6 acres)	NO	Andover; 51.180°N 1.627°W; SU 262 424	SM	Map Citation	This site on the land surrounding the Iron Age hill fort on Quarley Hill has chalk grassland which is maintained by cattle grazing. It is rich in herbs, such as felwort, small scabious, dropwort, chalk milkwort, greater butterfly-orchid and bastard toadflax.
Ratlake Meadows	Ratlake Meadows	✓		4.2 hectares (10 acres)	NO	Winchester; 51.010°N 1.411°W; SU 414 236		Map Citation	These unimproved meadows on London Clay are recorded back to the sixteenth century and are probably much older. They are dominated by sweet vernal grass, heath grass, tufted hairgrass and Yorkshire fog, and have a rich variety of herbs. Invertebrates include the rare bush cricket, long-winged conehead.
River Avon System	River Avon System	✓		475.9 hectares (1,176 acres)	PP	Salisbury; 51.025°N 1.822°W; SU 126 251	NCR, Ramsar, SPA	Map Citation	This site comprises stretches of the River Avon and its tributaries, which are described by Natural England as "of national and international importance for their wildlife communities". It has more than 180 species of aquatic plants and one of the most diverse fish species in the country. There is also a rich invertebrate fauna and mammals include water voles and water shrews.
River Itchen	River Itchen	✓		748.5 hectares (1,850 acres)	PP	Winchester; 51.032°N 1.294°W; SU 496 261	HIWWT, SAC	Map Citation	The SSSI covers the river and its banks, with fen, flood meadows, wet woodland and swamp. It has populations of the nationally rare southern damselfly and white-clawed crayfish. Other fauna include otters, water voles, Atlantic salmon, shovelers and Cetti's warblers.
River Test	River Test	✓		438.0 hectares (1,082 acres)	PP	Stockbridge; 51.118°N 1.453°W; SU 384 355	Ramsar, SPA	Map Citation	This chalk stream has one of the richest fauna and flora of any lowland river in England. More than 100 species of flowering plant have been recorded along its banks and 232 invertebrate taxa in the river. It is also important for wetland birds, with breeding species including kingfishers, grey wagtails and little grebes.
Ron Ward's Meadow with Tadley Pastures		✓		11.5 hectares (28 acres)		Tadley; 51.341°N 1.139°W; SU 601 606	HIWWT	Map Citation	
Roydon Woods	Roydon Woods	✓		294.9 hectares (729 acres)	YES	Lymington; 50.804°N 1.552°W; SU 317 006	HIWWT SAC	Map Citation	A large part of these woods are ancient, but other areas are former oak and hazel coppice planted in the nineteenth century. There are also areas of hornbeam and species-rich aldercarr. The SSSI also includes a stretch of the Lymington River and many open glades.
Rushmore and Conholt Downs	Rushmore Down	✓		111.5 hectares (276 acres)	NO	Andover; 51.290°N 1.510°W; SU 343 546	NCR	Map Citation	These chalk downs have areas of grassland and scrub. There is also woodland, which is dominated by oak and ash with hazel coppice. A stand of juniper trees is over a hundred years old, and it is thought to be the oldest on chalk in England, with some trees over 6 metres (20 feet) tall.
Selborne Common	Selborne Common	✓		99.8 hectares (247 acres)	YES	Alton; 51.093°N 0.955°W; SU 733 331	NCR, NT SAC	Map Citation	Most of this site is woodland which is dominated by beech trees, but there is a small area of species-rich grassland. It is a nationally important site for molluscs with at least 41 species. There are about 30 species of butterfly, including brown hairstreak and silver-washed fritillary.
Shortheath Common	Shortheath Common	✓		59.5 hectares (147 acres)	YES	Bordon; 51.124°N 0.894°W; SU 775 367	LNR, SAC	Map Citation	The common has areas of bracken, woodland, heath and a pond, but its main ecological interest is a large valley mire. Much of it is covered by Sphagnum mosses, but there are also many vascular plants, such as velvet bent and the insectivorous round-leaved sundew. The invertebrates are also of particular interest, including 23 breeding species of dragonfly.
Sidley Wood	Sidley Wood	✓		11.7 hectares (29 acres)	FP	Andover; 51.297°N 1.422°W; SU 404 555		Map Citation	This south-facing secondary wood on chalk soil has many stands of ancient hornbeam coppice, some of more than 2 metres (6.6 feet) in diameter; no other comparable stands are known in south central England. Other trees are oak, field maple, ash and hazel.
Sinah Common	Sinah Common	✓		243.0 hectares (600 acres)	PP	Hayling Island; 50.784°N 1.011°W; SZ 698 987		Map Citation	This coastal site has maritime shingle grassland, some of which is rich in lichens, sand dunes, heath and saltmarsh. It has also been designated an SSSI because of its population of the endangered flowering plant childing pink at one of only two sites in Britain, and for its outstanding assemblage of other nationally scarce plants. There are also populations of nationally rare and scarce invertebrates.
Southampton Common	Southampton Common	✓		90.3 hectares (223 acres)	YES	Southampton; 50.929°N 1.412°W; SU 414 146		Map Citation	The main ecological importance of this public park lies in its many amphibians, including one of the largest British populations of the nationally rare great crested newt. The common also has the two other species of newts native to Britain, palmate and smooth. The newts live in the lakes and ditches on the common and use the ditches to migrate to hibernating sites.
Sowley Pond	Sowley Pond	✓		49.3 hectares (122 acres)	NO	Lymington; 50.770°N 1.470°W; SZ 375 968	Ramsar, SPA	Map Citation	The pond was formed in the fourteenth century by damming a stream, and in the seventeenth century became a hammer pond for an ironworks. It is a refuge for ducks feeding on the surface and by diving, and it is surrounded by woods which have the largest heronry in the county.
St Catherine's Hill	t Catherine's Hill	✓		43.0 hectares (106 acres)	YES	Winchester; 51.044°N 1.310°W; SU 485 274	HIWWT, SM	Map Citation	This hill is covered by chalk grassland scrub and surrounded by the ramparts of an Iron Age hillfort. It has a rich herb flora, including thyme, common rock-rose, carline thistle, felwort, fairy flax and frog orchid. Sheltered areas are rich in invertebrates.
Stockbridge Common Marsh	Stockbridge Common Marsh	✓		64.8 hectares (160 acres)	YES	Stockbridge, Hampshire; 51.102°N 1.499°W; SU 352 338	NT	Map Citation	This site stretches for 2 kilometres (1.2 miles) along the flood plain of the River Test. It has wetland habitats including marsh, fen, carr, alluvial meadows and a large shallow lake. The marsh has a rich variety of flora, with 180 species of flowering plants, including bog pimpernel, adder’s-tongue fern, marsh valerian and bogbean.
Stockbridge Down	Stockbridge Down	✓		69.8 hectares (172 acres)	YES	Stockbridge, Hampshire; 51.112°N 1.460°W; SU 379 349	NCR, NT, SM	Map Citation	This site has a variety of scrub and grassland habitats on a north-west facing slope of chalk and a clay-with-flints plateau. There is a diverse range of butterflies, such as chalk-hill blue, marbled white and dark green fritillary, while moths include the oblique striped.
Stockbridge Fen		✓		6.0 hectares (15 acres)		Stockbridge, Hampshire; 51.116°N 1.499°W; SU 358 353	NCR	Map Citation	
Titchfield Haven	Titchfield Haven	✓		134.5 hectares (332 acres)	PP	Fareham; 50.827°N 1.238°W; SU 538 033	LNR, NNR, Ramsar, SPA	Map Citation	This was formerly a tidal estuary, but one way valves block salt water and it is now freshwater river and marshes, wet meadows bisected by ditches, and fen. It is important for wetland breeding birds, such as bearded reedlings, sedge warblers and reed warblers.
Toyd Down and Quarry	Toyd Down	✓		6.7 hectares (17 acres)	PP	Fordingbridge; 50.971°N 1.887°W; SU 080 191		Map Citation	This site is composed of two parts. Toyd Down is well developed grassland, while the quarry was worked until about 1970. This makes the site a good subject for studying the colonisation of bare chalk next to a mature species-rich meadow. Among the early cononisers are basil thyme, carline thistle and mouse-ear hawkweed.
Trodds Copse		✓		26.0 hectares (64 acres)		Romsey; 50.999°N 1.406°W; SU 418 224		Map Citation	
Upper Greensand Hangers: Empshott to Hawkley	Upper Greensand Hangers: Empshott to Hawkley	✓		37.7 hectares (93 acres)	PP	Liss; 51.067°N 0.925°W; SU 754 303	SAC	Map Citation	This site comprises a number of woods along steep rocky slopes in the Upper Greensand. These conditions produce unusual lime-rich woodlands and specialised mosses and liverworts on the rocks. The dominant tree is ash, which has often been coppiced. The ground flora is diverse, including plants such as dog's mercury and yellow archangel.
Upper Greensand Hangers: Wyck to Wheatley	Upper Greensand Hangers: Wyck to Wheatley	✓		13.2 hectares (33 acres)	PP	Bordon; 51.150°N 0.893°W; SU 775 395	SAC	Map Citation	This site is composed of woods on the steep rocky slopes of the Upper Greensand. Bare rocks are covered by lime-loving bryophytes such as Tortula marginata, Chiloscyphus pallescens and Fissidens gracilifolius. There is also a population of the nationally scarce mollusc Macrogastra rolphii.
Upper Hamble Estuary and Woods	Upper Hamble Estuary and Woods	✓		151.2 hectares (374 acres)	PP	Southampton; 50.897°N 1.280°W; SU 507 111	LNR, Ramsar, SAC, SPA	Map Citation	This site comprises the upper estuary of the River Hamble, together with adjoining saltmarsh, reedswamp and ancient semi-natural woodland. The woods have a diverse ground flora and invertebrate fauna. There is also a narrow zone of mudflats, with large numbers of marine worms, crustaceans and molluscs, which provide food for birds.
Waltham Chase Meadows		✓		6.4 hectares (16 acres)		Southampton; 50.931°N 1.199°W; SU 564 149		Map Citation	
Warblington Meadow	arblington Meadow	✓		3.9 hectares (9.6 acres)	NO	Havant; 50.842°N 0.966°W; SU 729 052		Map Citation	This site has areas of fresh and salt water marshes. It has a rich flora, with 158 species of flowering plants recorded, including marsh arrow-grass, ragged robin, creeping jenny, corky-fruited water-dropwort, bog pimpernel and southern marsh orchid. There is also a small unpolluted brook lined with trees.
Warnborough Green	Warnborough Green	✓		4.4 hectares (11 acres)	YES	Hook; 51.263°N 0.957°W; SU 729 520	HIWWT	Map Citation	This site consists of two species-rich wet meadows on either side of the River Whitewater. There are thirteen species of sedge, such as distant, flea and brown sedge. Invertebrates include two nationally rare flies, the soldier fly Stratiomys potamida and the hoverfly Xylota abiens.
Wealden Edge Hangers	Wealden Edge Hangers	✓		222.2 hectares (549 acres)	PP	Liss; 51.045°N 0.951°W; SU 736 278	LNR NNR, SAC	Map Citation	Natural England describes this site as "arguably,...one of the ecologically most interesting and diverse series of chalk woodlands in Britain". The rich ground flora includes many rare species, and 289 species of vascular plants have been recorded. There are more than 111 species of bryophytes and the lichen flora is the second richest in the country with 74 species.
West Minley Meadow		✓		4.5 hectares (11 acres)		Camberley; 51.314°N 0.836°W; SU 812 578		Map Citation	
West Woodhay Down	West Woodhay Down	✓		1.5 hectares (3.7 acres)	PP	Inkpen; 51.353°N 1.447°W; SU387617		Map Citation	This steeply sloping site on the Berkshire Downs is unimproved chalk grassland dominated by upright brome; but it has a rich variety of flora, including yellow-wort, purging flax, autumn hawkbit, wild mignonette, fragrant orchid and burnet saxifrage.
Wick Wood and Worldham Hangers	Wick Wood and Worldham Hangers	✓		91.8 hectares (227 acres)	PP	Alton; 51.117°N 0.923°W; SU 755 359	SAC	Map Citation	This site has ancient semi-natural woods on the steep slopes of the Upper Greensand and the adjacent gently sloping Gault Clay, with a number of springs at the junction of the two strata. The ground flora on the unstable upper slopes is sparse, but lower down it is rich and dominated by wild garlic. Two ponds add to the habitat diversity.
The Wild Grounds	The Wild Grounds	✓		28.2 hectares (70 acres)	YES	Gosport; 50.805°N 1.178°W; SU 580 009	LNR	Map Citation	This site was probably common land until around 1600, after which it developed into woodland dominated by oak trees. It is not rich in flora, but is of great interest ecologically and historically for its natural origin and its structure, being composed of old trees of uneven age which will be allowed to live their natural life span.
Woolmer Forest	Woolmer Forest	✓		1,298.5 hectares (3,209 acres)	PP	Liphook; 51.079°N 0.857°W; SU 802 317	NCR SAC SPA	Map Citation	The forest has a nationally important heathland flora, with rare plants such as tower mustard, mossy stonecrop, shepherd’s cress and smooth cat’s-ear. The invertebrate fauna is very rich. There are extensive areas of open water and it is the only site in the country known to have all twelve native species of reptiles and amphibians.

== See also ==
- List of local nature reserves in Hampshire
- Hampshire and Isle of Wight Wildlife Trust

== Sources ==
- Ratcliffe, Derek, ed. (1977). A Nature Conservation Review. Vol. 2. Cambridge, UK: Cambridge University Press. ISBN 978-0-521-21403-2.
