= Sidley =

Sidley may refer to:

- Sidley, East Sussex, England
  - Sidley railway station
  - Sidley United F.C. football club
- Sidley Austin, American legal firm
- Mount Sidley, a volcano in Antarctica
- Sidley Wood, a Site of Special Scientific Interest in Hampshire, U.K.

== See also ==
- Sedley Baronets
