= Highcliffe to Milford Cliffs =

UK Site of Special Scientific Interest

Coordinates: 50.733°N 1.663°W

- Site of Special Scientific Interest
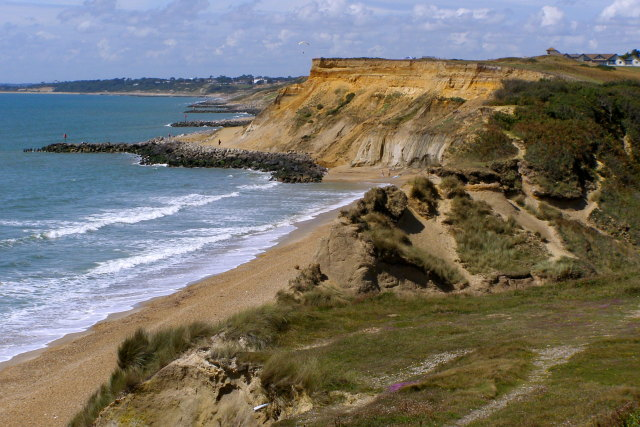
- Location of Highcliffe to Milford Cliffs.
- Area of search: Dorset; Hampshire
- Grid reference: SZ 239 926
- Interest: Geological
- Area: 110.1 hectares (272 acres)
- Notification date: 1991
- Location map: Magic Map

Highcliffe to Milford Cliffs is a 110.1-hectare (272-acre) geological Site of Special Scientific Interest which stretches along the south coast of England from Christchurch in Dorset to Milford on Sea in Hampshire. It includes several Geological Conservation Review sites.

This site stretches along the cliffs of Christchurch Bay for 9-kilometre (5.6-mile). It exposes the fossil rich strata of the Barton Beds and Headon Beds, dating to the Eocene epoch around 40 million years ago, and is the type locality for many species of fauna and flora. The Barton Beds are capped by Pleistocene gravels which are rich in Paleolithic artefacts.
