= Coombe Wood and The Lythe =

Protected area in Hampshire, England

Coordinates: 51.105°N 0.933°W

- Site of Special Scientific Interest
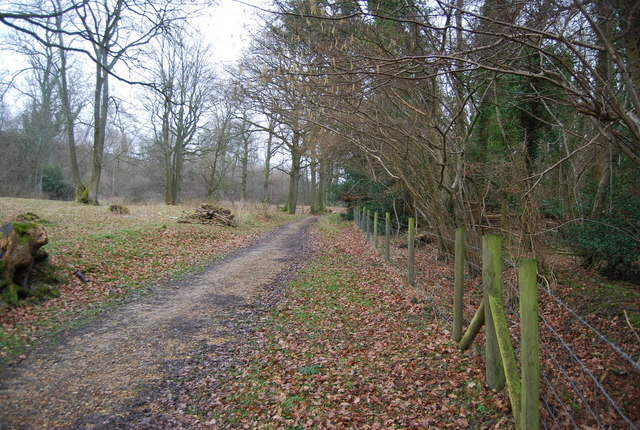
- Footpath through Coombe Wood
- Location of Coombe Wood and The Lythe.
- Area of search: Hampshire
- Grid reference: SU 748 345
- Interest: Biological
- Area: 44.0 hectares (109 acres)
- Notification date: 1984
- Location map: Magic Map

Coombe Wood and The Lythe is a 44-hectare (110-acre) biological Site of Special Scientific Interest west of Bordon in Hampshire. It is part of East Hampshire Hangers Special Area of Conservation and Combe Wood is a National Trust property.

This site has woods on Wealden Upper Greensand with a rich bryophyte flora and calcareous ground flora, especially green hellebore and violet helleborine. There are also meadows bordering a stream and an oak and hazel wood on Gault clay.
