= Lymington River SSSI =

Protected area in Hampshire, England

Coordinates: 50.812°N 1.576°W

Lymington River
- Site of Special Scientific Interest
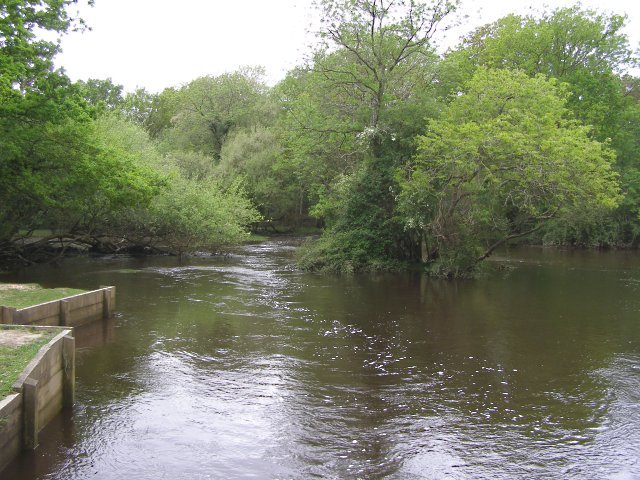
- Ober Water (left) and the Highland Water (right) merge to form the Lymington River
- Location of Lymington River.
- Area of search: Hampshire
- Grid reference: SU 300 015
- Interest: Biological; Geological
- Area: 34.8 hectares (86 acres)
- Notification date: 1997
- Location map: Magic Map

Lymington River SSSI is a 34.8-hectare (86-acre) biological and geological Site of Special Scientific Interest along Lymington River and its tributaries between Lymington, Burley and Stoney Cross in Hampshire. Highland Water is a Geological Conservation Review site and Ober Water is a Nature Conservation Review site, Grade I. Parts of the site are in The New Forest and Solent and Southampton Water Ramsar sites, and in The New Forest Special Protection Area.

This site covers the river and its tributaries Highland Water, Ober Water and Mill Lawn Brook, and no other system in England shows such a rapid succession of plant communities in such a short stretch of river. Ober Water has a very unusual and diverse flora and several rare and protected species of dragonfly. Highland Water is important for illustrating fluvial processes in rivers in southern England which have not been subject to modification.
