= Wealden Edge Hangers =

Protected area in Hampshire, England

Coordinates: 51.045°N 0.951°W

- Site of Special Scientific Interest
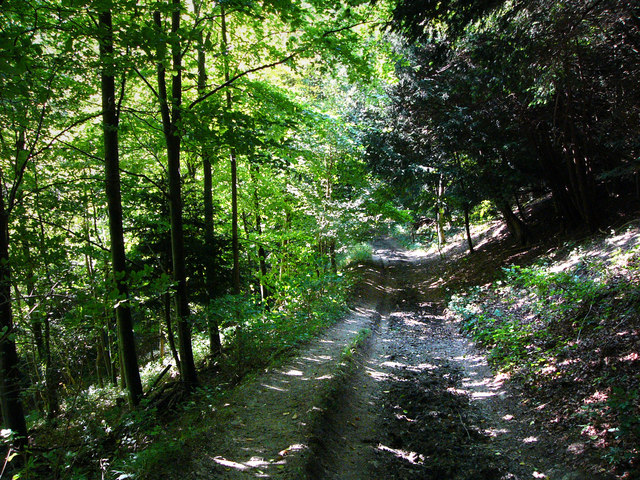
- Location of Wealden Edge Hangers.
- Area of search: Hampshire
- Grid reference: SU 736 278
- Interest: Biological
- Area: 222.4 hectares (550 acres)
- Notification date: 1984
- Location map: Magic Map

Wealden Edge Hangers is a 222.4-hectare (550-acre) biological Site of Special Scientific Interest north of Petersfield in Hampshire. An area of 48 hectares (120 acres) is Wealden Edge Hangers Local Nature Reserve and an area of 144.1 hectares (356 acres) is Ashford Hangers National Nature Reserve. Wealden Edge Hangers is part of the East Hampshire Hangers Special Area of Conservation.

Natural England describes this site as "arguably,...one of the ecologically most interesting and diverse series of chalk woodlands in Britain". The rich ground flora includes many rare species, and 289 species of vascular plants have been recorded. There are more than 111 species of bryophytes and the lichen flora is the second richest in the country with 74 species.
