= Moorgreen Meadows =

Protected area in Hampshire, England

Coordinates: 50.929°N 1.314°W

- Site of Special Scientific Interest
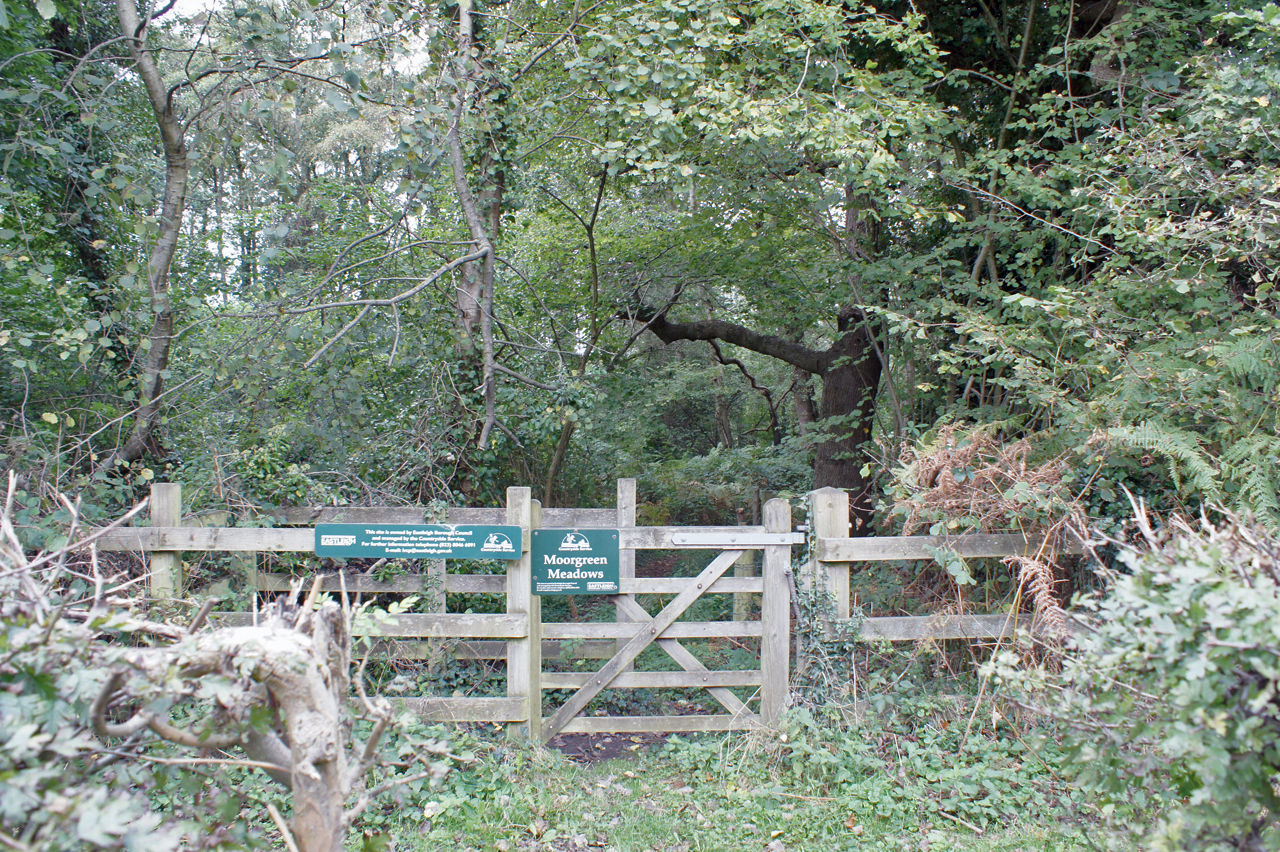
- Location of Moorgreen Meadows.
- Area of search: Hampshire
- Grid reference: SU 483 146
- Interest: Biological
- Area: 14.3 hectares (35 acres)
- Notification date: 1982
- Location map: Magic Map

Moorgreen Meadows is a 14.3-hectare (35-acre) biological Site of Special Scientific Interest in Southampton in Hampshire.

These meadows are important for their populations of the genus marsh orchid, especially the northern marsh orchid, which is not found at any other location in southern England. They grow close to four other marsh orchid species, early marsh-orchid, common spotted orchid, heath spotted-orchid and southern marsh orchid. Hybrids occur in every combination, making the site a centre of micro-evolution.
