= Binswood =

UK Site of Special Scientific Interest

Coordinates: 51.127°N 0.910°W

- Site of Special Scientific Interest
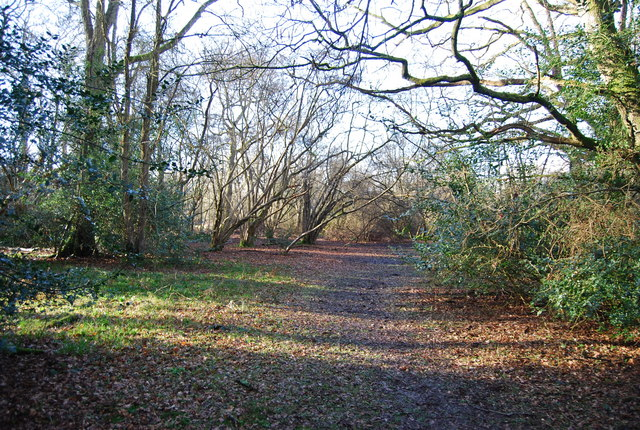
- Location of Binswood.
- Area of search: Hampshire
- Grid reference: SU 764 370
- Interest: Biological
- Area: 62.5 hectares (154 acres)
- Notification date: 1984
- Location map: Magic Map

Binswood is a 62.5-hectare (154-acre) biological Site of Special Scientific Interest southeast of Alton in Hampshire.

This is a small surviving part of the Royal Forest of Woolmer. It is mainly unimproved grassland with scattered trees and areas of dense woodland, and the oldest trees may be 200 years old. It is still managed as a wood with common rights of grazing, and actively managed wood pasture is now a rare habitat.

The site is a registered common which is crossed by public footpaths.
