= Norley Copse and Meadow =

Coordinates: 50.779°N 1.487°W

- Site of Special Scientific Interest
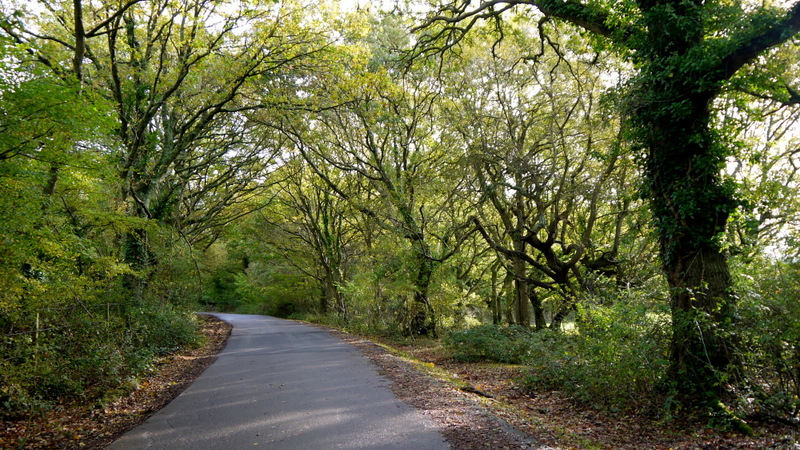
- Location of Norley Copse and Meadow.
- Area of search: Hampshire
- Grid reference: SZ 363 978
- Interest: Biological
- Area: 7.5 hectares (19 acres)
- Notification date: 1984
- Location map: Magic Map

Norley Copse and Meadow is a 7.5-hectare (19-acre) biological Site of Special Scientific Interest east of Lymington in Hampshire. It is part of New Forest Ramsar site and Special Protection Area.

The Crockford Stream runs through this site, which has old oak woodland with hazel coppice and unimproved grassland which is managed by grazing. The meadow has 140 species of higher plants and it is also rich in invertebrates, including eight species of dragonfly and a rare picture-winged fly, Sphenella marginata.
