= Burton Common =

Site of Special Scientific Interest in Hampshire, England

Coordinates: 50.758°N 1.728°W

- Site of Special Scientific Interest
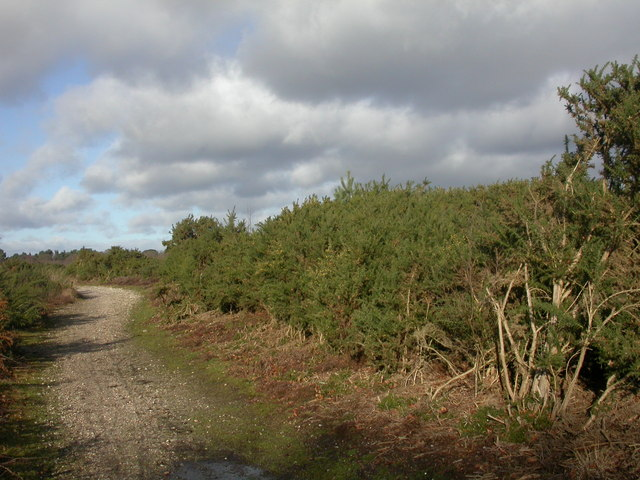
- Location of Burton Common.
- Area of search: Hampshire
- Grid reference: SZ 193 954
- Interest: Biological
- Area: 32.1 hectares (79 acres)
- Notification date: 1984
- Location map: Magic Map

Burton Common is a 32.1-hectare (79-acre) biological Site of Special Scientific Interest south of Bransgore in Hampshire.

This dry heath has over-mature heather with a rich bryophyte and lichen flora. There are populations of sand lizards and smooth snakes, both of which are species associated with mature dry heathland. There are also areas of deciduous woodland along the banks of a stream and of Scots pine.
