= Botley Wood and Everett's and Mushes Copses =

Protected area in Hampshire, England

Coordinates: 50.888°N 1.232°W

- Site of Special Scientific Interest
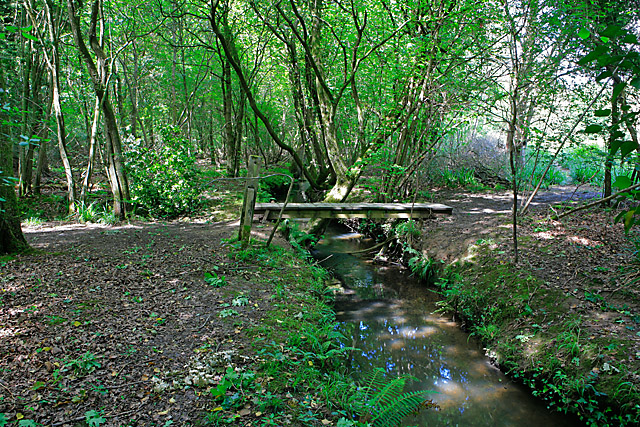
- Footbridge over stream in Botley Wood
- Location of Botley Wood and Everett's and Mushes Copses.
- Area of search: Hampshire
- Grid reference: SU 541 101
- Interest: Biological
- Area: 352.7 hectares (872 acres)
- Notification date: 1986
- Location map: Magic Map

Botley Wood and Everett's and Mushes Copses is a 352.7-hectare (872-acre) biological Site of Special Scientific Interest north of Fareham in Hampshire.

Botley Wood is nationally recognized for its butterfly population, with more than 30 breeding species, including the pearl-bordered fritillary, white-letter hairstreak, dark green fritillary, and purple emperor. Everett's and Mushes Copses contain a rich flora, with over fifty species of flowering plants typical of ancient woodlands.
