= Peake Wood =

Protected area in Hampshire, England

Coordinates: 50.990°N 1.091°W

- Site of Special Scientific Interest
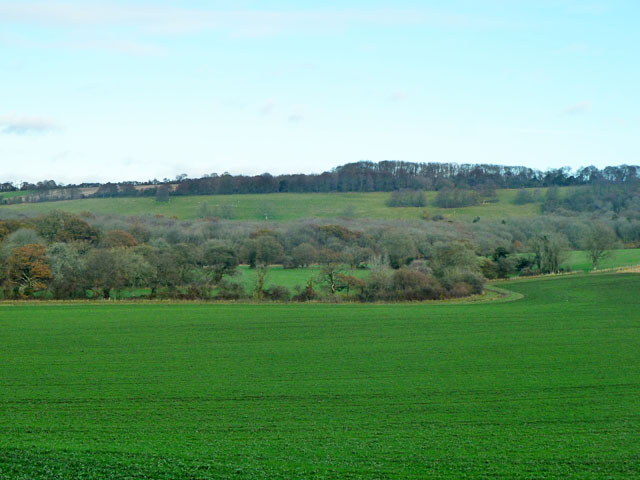
- Location of Peake Wood.
- Area of search: Hampshire
- Grid reference: SU 639 216
- Interest: Biological
- Area: 17.7 hectares (44 acres)
- Notification date: 1984
- Location map: Magic Map

Peake Wood is a 17.7-hectare (44-acre) biological Site of Special Scientific Interest west of Petersfield in Hampshire.

This is a prime example of a hazel and ash wood on calcareous soils. There is also a variety of other trees and a rich herb layer, which is dominated by bluebell and dog's mercury. Other plants include the rare star-of-Bethlehem and fly orchid.

The site is private land with no public access.
