= Upper Greensand Hangers: Wyck to Wheatley =

Protected area in Hampshire, England

Coordinates: 51.150°N 0.893°W

- Site of Special Scientific Interest
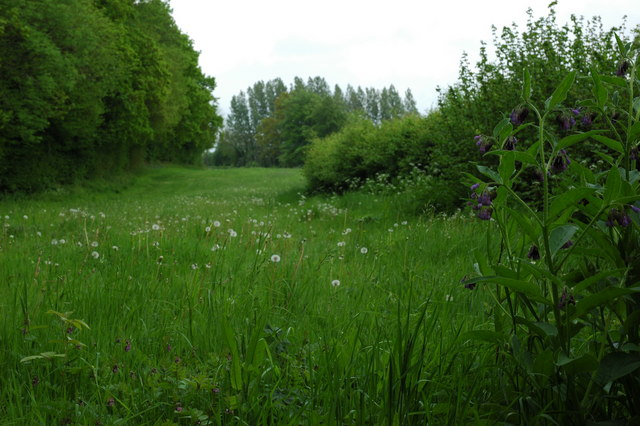
- Location of Upper Greensand Hangers: Wyck to Wheatley.
- Area of search: Hampshire
- Grid reference: SU 775 395
- Interest: Biological
- Area: 13.2 hectares (33 acres)
- Notification date: 1999
- Location map: Magic Map

Upper Greensand Hangers: Wyck to Wheatley is a 13.2-hectare (33-acre) biological Site of Special Scientific Interest east of Alton in Hampshire. It is part of the East Hampshire Hangers Special Area of Conservation.

This site is composed of woods on the steep rocky slopes of the Upper Greensand. Bare rocks are covered by lime-loving bryophytes such as Tortula marginata, Chiloscyphus pallescens and Fissidens gracilifolius. There is also a population of the nationally scarce mollusc Macrogastra rolphii.
