= Bransbury Common =

Protected area in Hampshire, England

Coordinates: 51.171°N 1.414°W

- Site of Special Scientific Interest
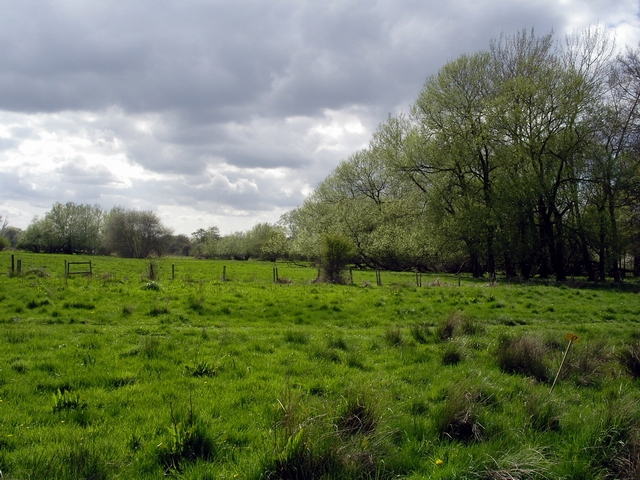
- Location of Bransbury Common.
- Area of search: Hampshire
- Grid reference: SU 411 415
- Interest: Biological
- Area: 158.6 hectares (392 acres)
- Notification date: 1984
- Location map: Magic Map

Bransbury Common is a 158.6-hectare (392-acre) biological Site of Special Scientific Interest south-east of Andover in Hampshire. It is a Nature Conservation Review site, Grade I.

This site has two different habitats. The soil of the common is peat over gravel, and the dominant plants are purple moor-grass and greater tussock-sedge. There is also a former water meadow, which has flowering plants including lady's smock, marsh marigold and early marsh-orchid.
