= North Solent =

Geological site in Hampshire, England

Coordinates: 50.736°N 1.532°W

- Site of Special Scientific Interest
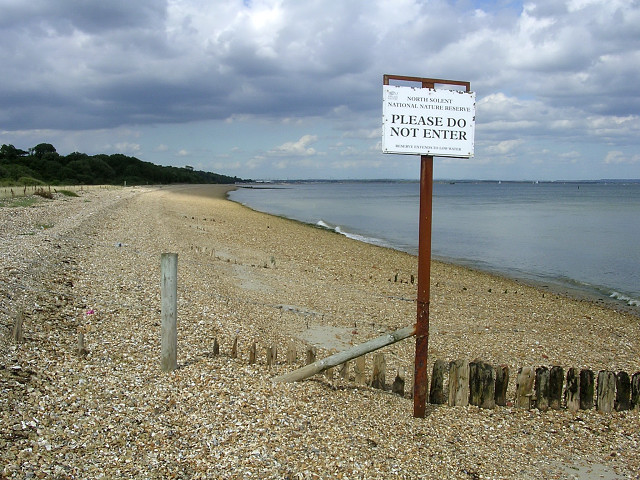
- Location of North Solent.
- Area of search: Hampshire
- Grid reference: SZ 427 993
- Interest: Biological; Geological
- Area: 1,186.7 hectares (2,932 acres)
- Notification date: 1990
- Location map: Magic Map

North Solent is a 1,186.7-hectare (2,932-acre) biological and geological Site of Special Scientific Interest along the north bank of the Solent between East End and Calshot in Hampshire. It is a Nature Conservation Review site, Grade I. Part of it is in North Solent National Nature Reserve and two areas are Geological Conservation Review sites. It is part of Solent and Southampton Water Ramsar site and Special Protection Area, and of Solent Maritime Special Area of Conservation. Boldre Foreshore is a local nature reserve.

This site has diverse habitats, including mudflats, saltmarshes, beaches, marshes, grassland and woods. It has rich insect populations and is of international importance for its wintering and migratory wildfowl and waders. Stone Point is important for studies of Quaternary stratigraphy, and it has many fossils dating to the Eemian interglacial, around 120,000 years ago.
