= Ashford Hill Woods and Meadows =

UK Site of Special Scientific Interest

Coordinates: 51.352°N 1.194°W

- Site of Special Scientific Interest
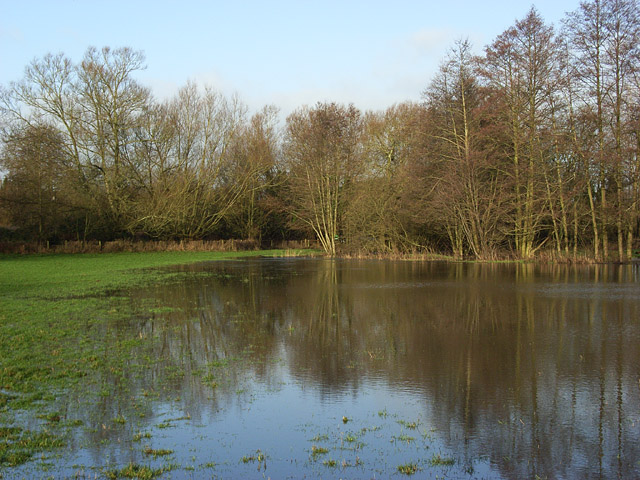
- Location of Ashford Hill Woods and Meadows.
- Area of search: Hampshire
- Grid reference: SU 562 617
- Interest: Biological
- Area: 141.5 hectares (350 acres)
- Notification date: 1986
- Location map: Magic Map

Ashford Hill Woods and Meadows is a 141.5-hectare (350-acre) biological Site of Special Scientific Interest near Ashford Hill in Hampshire. An area of 23.45 hectares (57.9 acres) is Ashford Hill NNR, which is a National Nature Reserve.

This biologically rich site is a valley on London Clay and Lower Bagshot Beds. It has varied woodlands and agriculturally unimproved meadows. The diverse invertebrate fauna includes 31 species of butterflies, and more than 400 species of moth, including the uncommon orange moth and pale oak eggar.
