= Bramshott and Ludshott Commons =

UK Site of Special Scientific Interest

Coordinates: 51.104°N 0.782°W

- Site of Special Scientific Interest
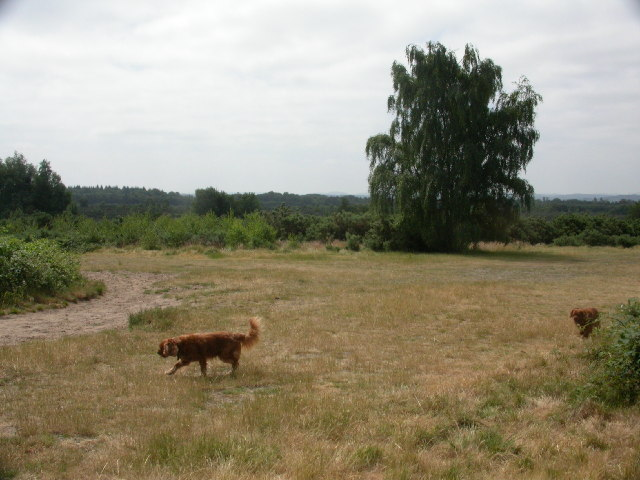
- Ludshott Common
- Location of Bramshott and Ludshott Commons.
- Area of search: Hampshire
- Grid reference: SU 854 346
- Interest: Biological
- Area: 374.4 hectares (925 acres)
- Notification date: 1984
- Location map: Magic Map

Bramshott and Ludshott Commons is a 374.4-hectare (925-acre) biological Site of Special Scientific Interest near Grayshott in Hampshire. It is part of Wealden Heaths Phase II Special Protection Area.

The site has large areas of heath which are dominated by heather, bell heather, common gorse and dwarf gorse. There are also woodland areas with ancient trees, with at least 87 taxa of epiphytic lichens, most of which are associated with ancient woods and several of which are rare.

Land ownership within Bramshott and Ludshott Commons SSSI is dominated by two institutional landowners; the National Trust and the Ministry of Defence. The National Trust own much of Ludshott Common while the Ministry of Defence own much of Bramshott common.
