= Crab Wood =

UK Site of Special Scientific Interest

Coordinates: 51.064°N 1.382°W

- Site of Special Scientific Interest
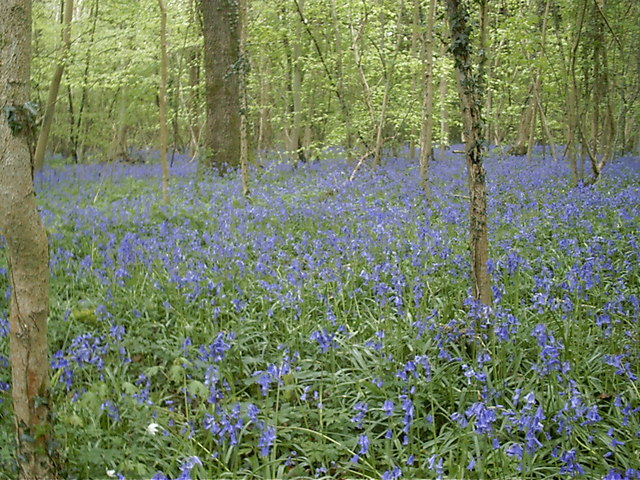
- Location of Crab Wood.
- Area of search: Hampshire
- Grid reference: SU 434 296
- Interest: Biological
- Area: 73.0 hectares (180 acres)
- Notification date: 1985
- Location map: Magic Map

Crab Wood is a 73-hectare (180-acre) biological Site of Special Scientific Interest west of Winchester in Hampshire. An area of 37.8 hectares (93 acres) is also a Local Nature Reserve.

This site has been wooded at least since the sixteenth century. It has a hazel layer which has been coppiced, large oaks and some beech, ash and birch trees. There is a rich butterfly fauna, including purple emperors.
