= Micheldever Spoil Heaps =

Application of equilibrium constant

Coordinates: 51.196°N 1.257°W

- Site of Special Scientific Interest
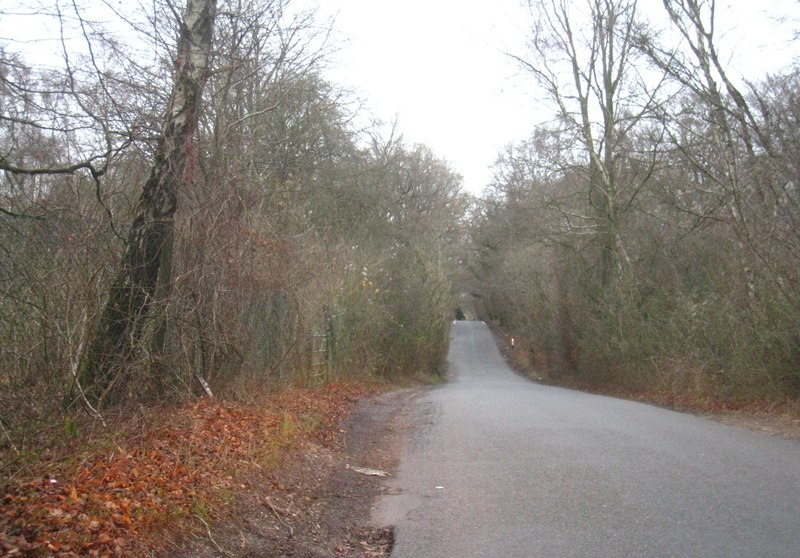
- Location of Micheldever Spoil Heaps.
- Area of search: Hampshire
- Grid reference: SU 520 444
- Interest: Biological
- Area: 32.1 hectares (79 acres)
- Notification date: 1982
- Location map: Magic Map

Micheldever Spoil Heaps is a 32.1-hectare (79-acre) biological Site of Special Scientific Interest in Micheldever in Hampshire.

This site is composed of spoil heaps from nineteenth-century railway construction, and it is described by Natural England as "of quite exceptional botanical importance". Most species have colonised the site from nearby, but some from a distance, and the plant assemblage is in a state of flux, with many rareties. There are large populations of fly orchids.

The site is open to the public.
