= East Aston Common =

UK Site of Special Scientific Interest

Coordinates: 51.202°N 1.364°W

- Site of Special Scientific Interest
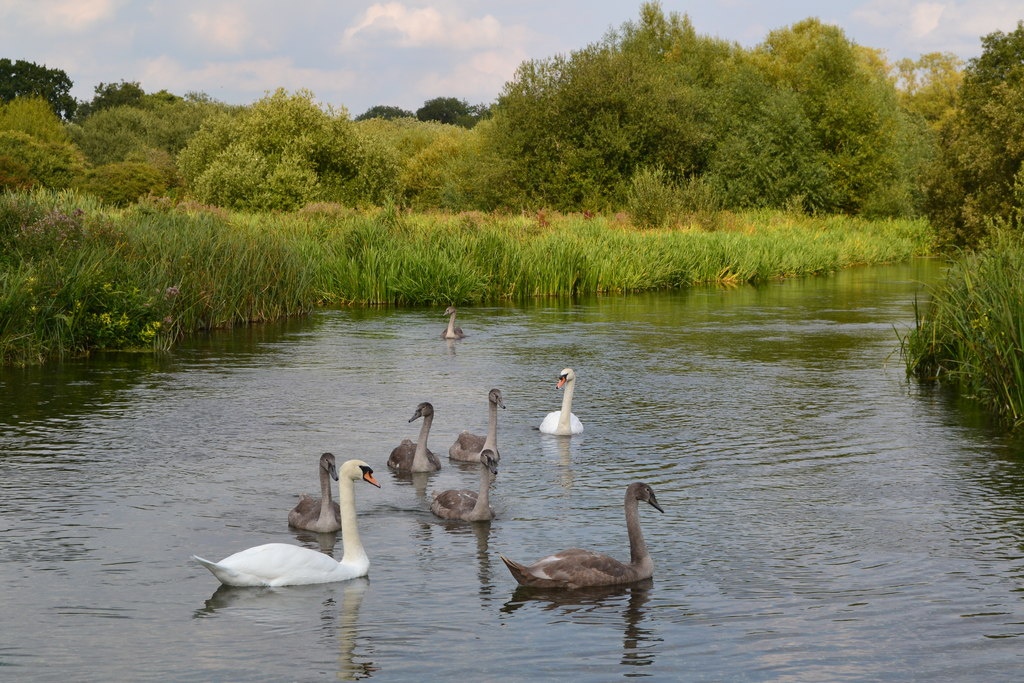
- Location of East Aston Common.
- Area of search: Hampshire
- Grid reference: SU 445 450
- Interest: Biological
- Area: 18.2 hectares (45 acres)
- Notification date: 1987
- Location map: Magic Map

East Aston Common is an 18.2-hectare (45-acre) biological Site of Special Scientific Interest east of Andover in Hampshire.

This site in the flood plain of the River Test is part of one of the finest chalk stream habitats in Britain. It has alluvial meadows with a rich variety of herbs, areas of tall fen and a wide and shallow stretch of the river. There are many wetland birds, such as grasshopper warblers, water rails and reed bunting.
