= Toyd Down and Quarry =

Quarry in Hampshire, England

Coordinates: 50.971°N 1.887°W

- Site of Special Scientific Interest
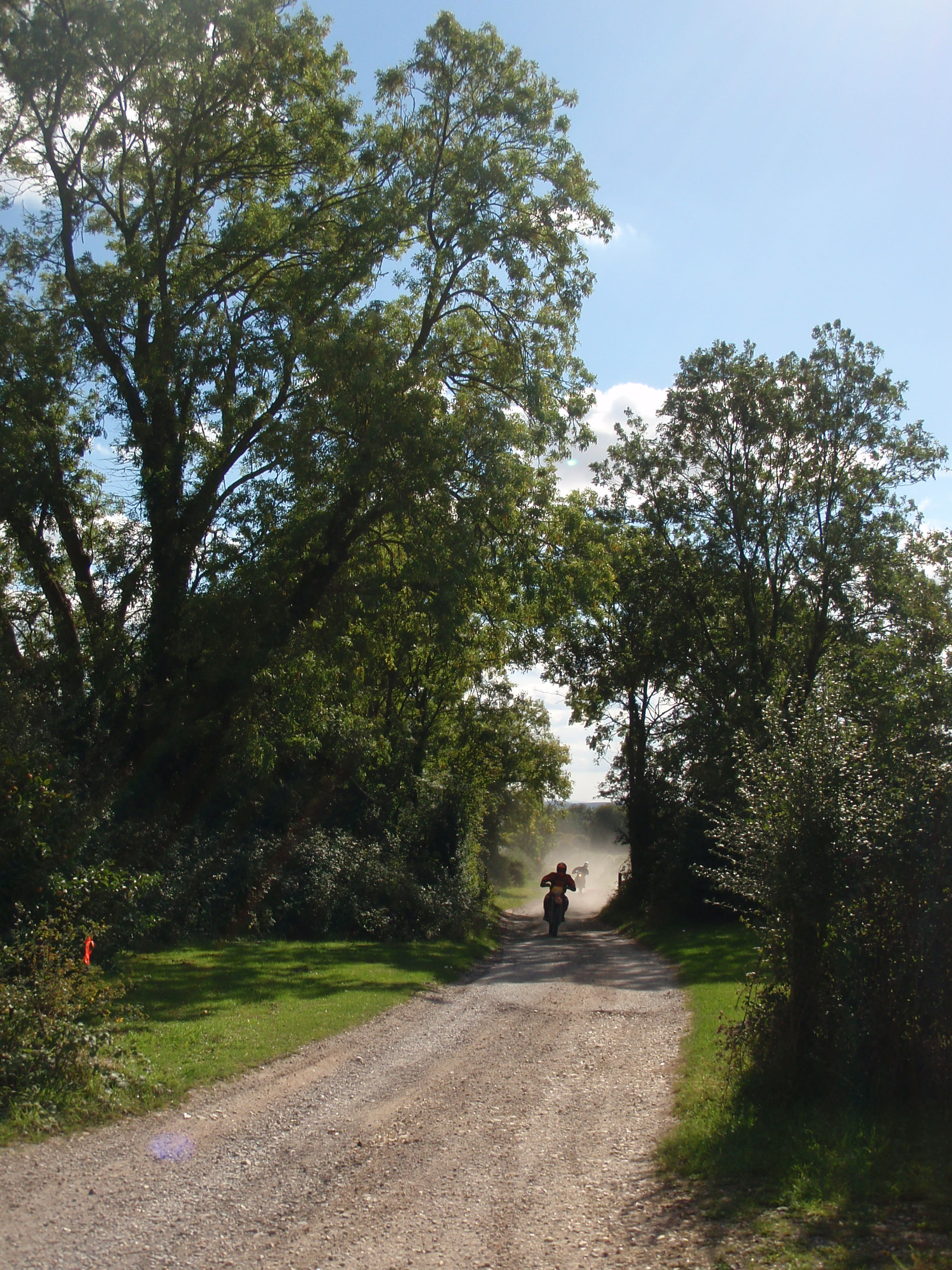
- Location of Toyd Down and Quarry.
- Area of search: Hampshire
- Grid reference: SU 080 191
- Interest: Biological
- Area: 6.7 hectares (17 acres)
- Notification date: 1987
- Location map: Magic Map

Toyd Down and Quarry is a 6.7-hectare (17-acre) biological Site of Special Scientific Interest east of Martin in Hampshire.

This site is composed of two parts. Toyd Down is well developed grassland, while the quarry was worked until about 1970. This makes the site a good subject for studying the colonisation of bare chalk next to a mature species-rich meadow. Among the early colonisers are basil thyme, carline thistle and mouse-ear hawkweed.
