= Brickworth Down and Dean Hill =

Biological Site of Special Scientific Interest in Wiltshire, England

Coordinates: 51.03194°N 1.65057°W

Brickworth Down and Dean Hill (grid reference SU246259) is a 118.6 hectare biological Site of Special Scientific Interest in Wiltshire, notified in 1951.

== Sources ==
- Natural England citation sheet for the site (accessed 22 March 2022)
