= Dibden Bay =

UK Site of Special Scientific Interest

Coordinates: 50.882°N 1.420°W

- Site of Special Scientific Interest
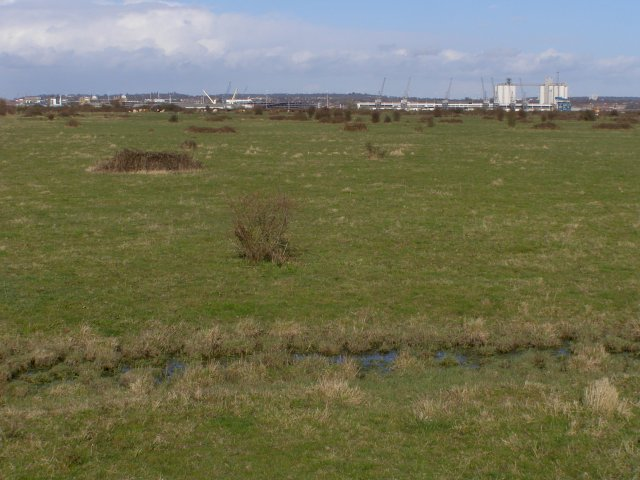
- Location of Dibden Bay.
- Area of search: Hampshire
- Grid reference: SU 409 093
- Interest: Biological
- Area: 229.4 hectares (567 acres)
- Notification date: 2001
- Location map: Magic Map

Dibden Bay is a 229.4-hectare (567-acre) biological Site of Special Scientific Interest (SSSI) between Marchwood and Hythe in Hampshire.

Most of this site was formed by deposition of material dredged from Southampton Water. It has been designated an SSSI because it has a nationally important collection of invertebrates, including 21 species which are nationally rare and another 67 which are nationally scarce. The site is also important because of its nesting lapwings, and there are wintering wildfowl such as wigeon, teal, pintail and mallard.
