= Warblington Meadow =

Protected area in Hampshire, England

Coordinates: 50.842°N 0.966°W

- Site of Special Scientific Interest
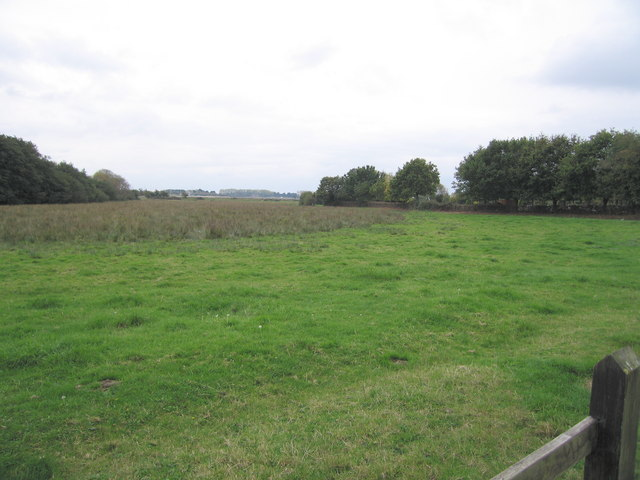
- Location of Warblington Meadow.
- Area of search: Hampshire
- Grid reference: SU 729 052
- Interest: Biological
- Area: 3.9 hectares (9.6 acres)
- Notification date: 1986
- Location map: Magic Map

Warblington Meadow is a 3.9-hectare (9.6-acre) biological Site of Special Scientific Interest west of Emsworth in Hampshire.

This site has areas of fresh and salt water marshes. It has a rich flora, with 158 species of flowering plants recorded, including marsh arrow-grass, ragged robin, creeping jenny, corky-fruited water-dropwort, bog pimpernel and southern marsh orchid. There is also a small unpolluted brook lined with trees.

The site is private land with no public access.
