= Duncroft Farm Pit =

Coordinates: 51.328°N 1.318°W

- Site of Special Scientific Interest
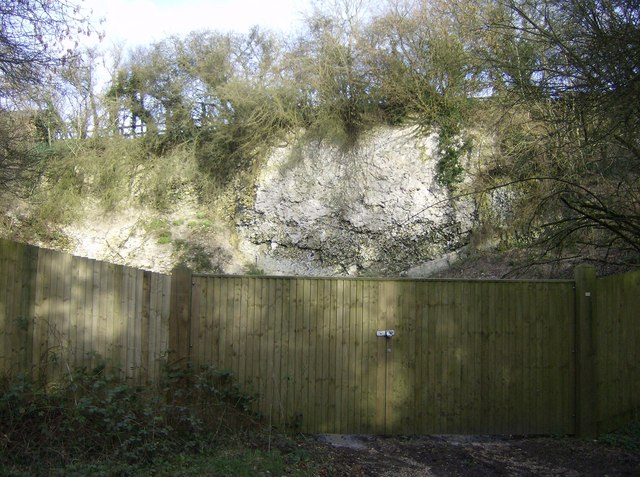
- Location of Duncroft Farm Pit.
- Area of search: Hampshire
- Grid reference: SU 476 590
- Interest: Geological
- Area: 0.1 hectares (0.25 acres)
- Notification date: 1991
- Location map: Magic Map

Duncroft Farm Pit is a 0.1-hectare (0.25-acre) geological Site of Special Scientific Interest west of Kingsclere in Hampshire. It is a Geological Conservation Review site.

This site exposes beds dating to the Upper Chalk of the Late Cretaceous epoch, 100 to 66 million years ago. The strata are in the middle of the Kingsclere Monocline, a steep fold which is thought to be due to later movement in the underlying rocks.

The site is private land with no public access.
