= Sinah Common =

Site of biological interest in Hampshire, England

Coordinates: 50.784°N 1.011°W

- Site of Special Scientific Interest
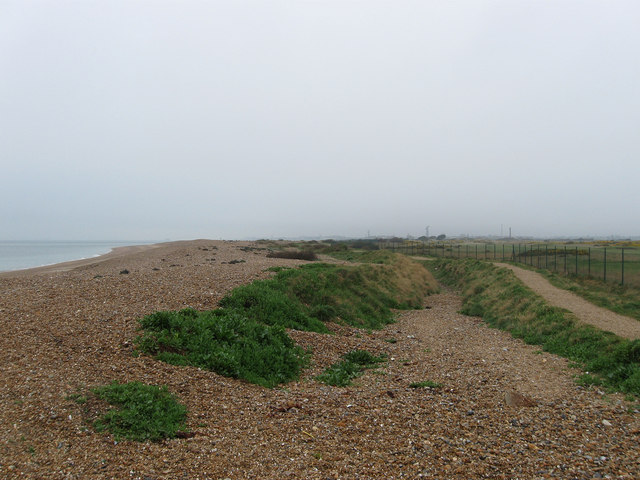
- Location of Sinah Common.
- Area of search: Hampshire
- Grid reference: SZ 698 987
- Interest: Biological
- Area: 243.0 hectares (600 acres)
- Notification date: 2000
- Location map: Magic Map

Sinah Common is a 243-hectare (600-acre) biological Site of Special Scientific Interest on Hayling Island in Hampshire, England.

This coastal site has maritime shingle grassland, some of which is rich in lichens, sand dunes, heath and saltmarsh. It has also been designated an SSSI because of its population of the endangered flowering plant childing pink at one of only two sites in Britain, and for its outstanding assemblage of other nationally scarce plants. There are also populations of nationally rare and scarce invertebrates.

It lies adjacent to the Sinah Common World War II Heavy Anti-aircraft gunsite, a scheduled monument, with a small overlap.
