= Eelmoor Marsh =

Site of Special Scientific Interest in Great Britain

Coordinates: 51.274°N 0.797°W

- Site of Special Scientific Interest
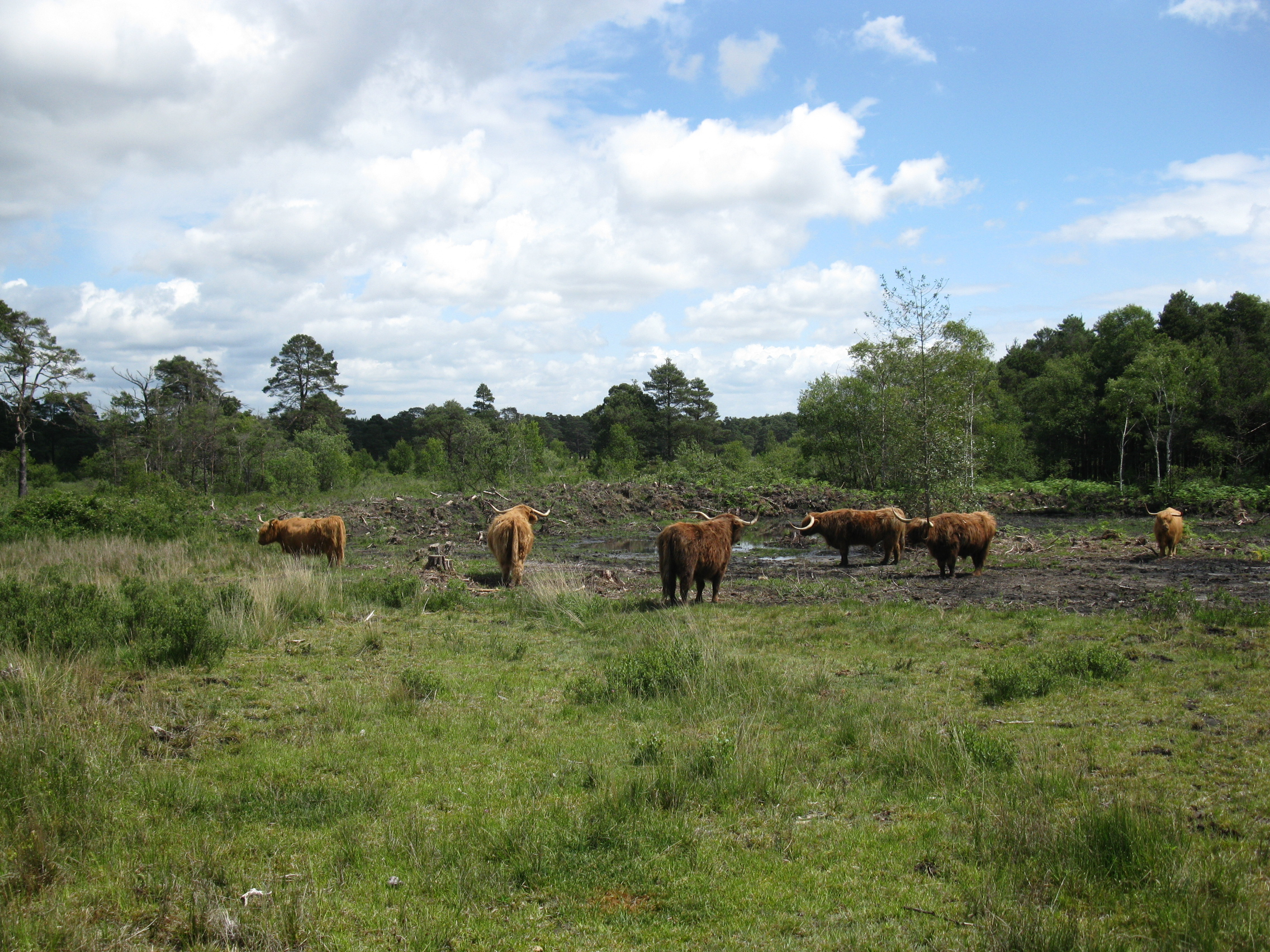
- Location of Eelmoor Marsh.
- Area of search: Hampshire
- Grid reference: SU 840 534
- Interest: Biological
- Area: 66.3 hectares (164 acres)
- Notification date: 1993
- Location map: Magic Map

Eelmoor Marsh is a 66.3-hectare (164-acre) biological Site of Special Scientific Interest between Fleet and Farnborough in Hampshire. It is part of Thames Basin Heaths Special Protection Area for the conservation of wild birds.

This site has a bog with deep peat, grass heath, woodland and a network of ditches. The bog has more than 250 species of flowering plants and grasses, including the insectivorous common butterwort, pale butterwort, small bladderwort and common sundew. There is also a diverse invertebrate fauna.

Eelmoor Marsh has been managed by Marwell Wildlife since 1995, including conservation grazing using the endangered Przewalski's horse and as a site for the reintroduction of the sand lizard, one of the U.K.'s rarest reptiles

== Species Gallery ==
Some photos of notable species at Eelmoor Marsh Site of Special Scientific Interest.

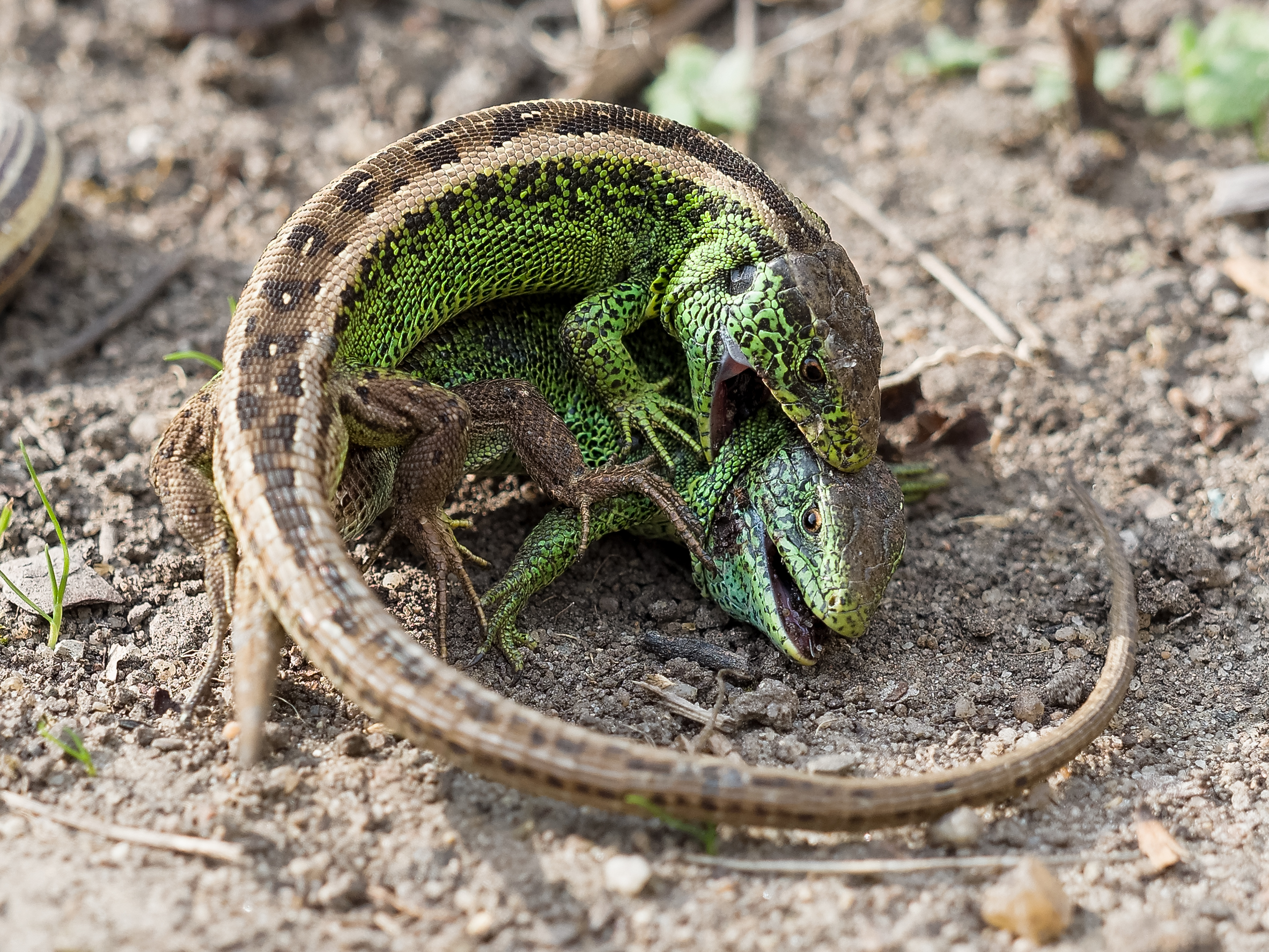
Male sand lizards (fighting).

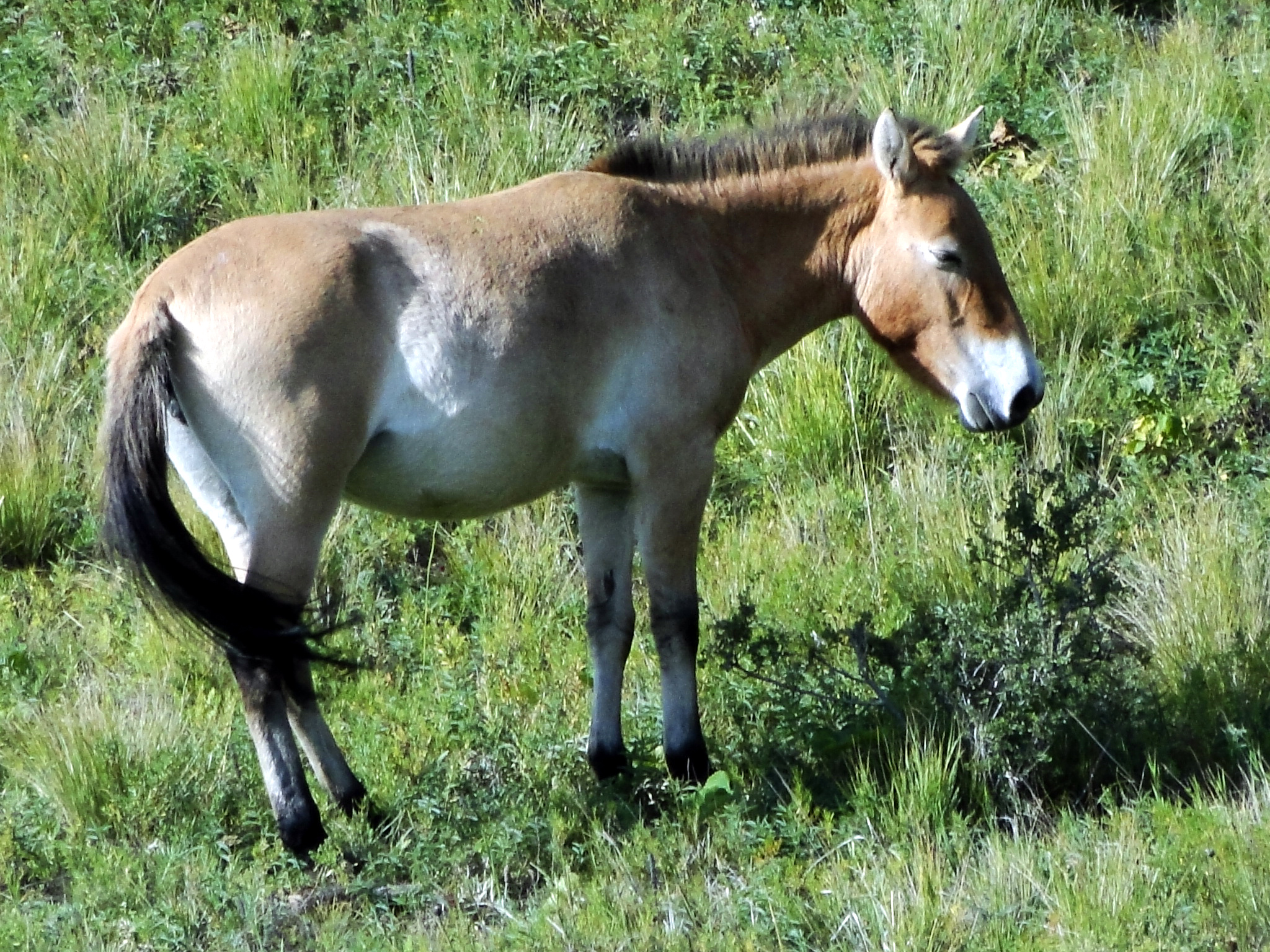
Wild horse.

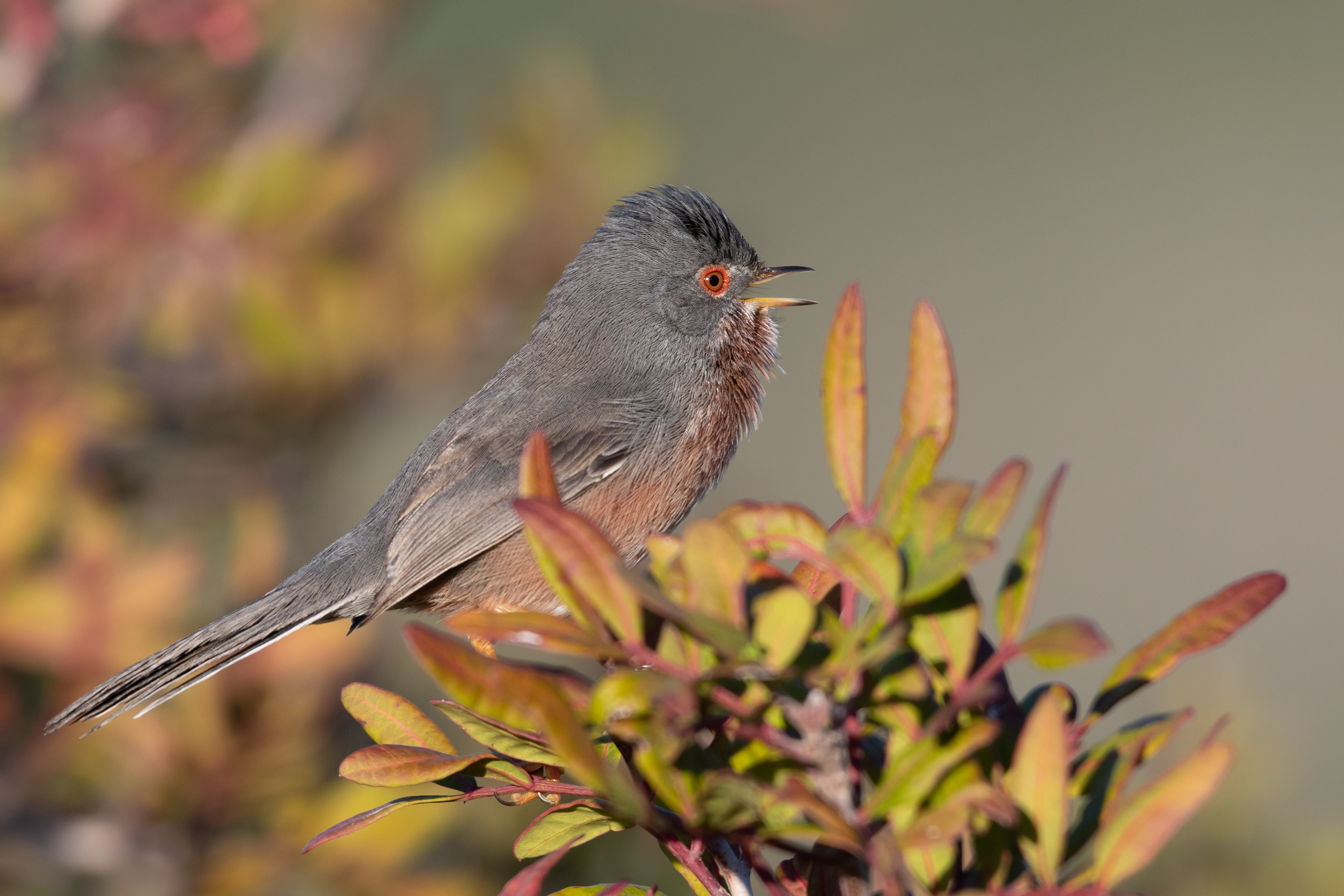
Dartford warbler.

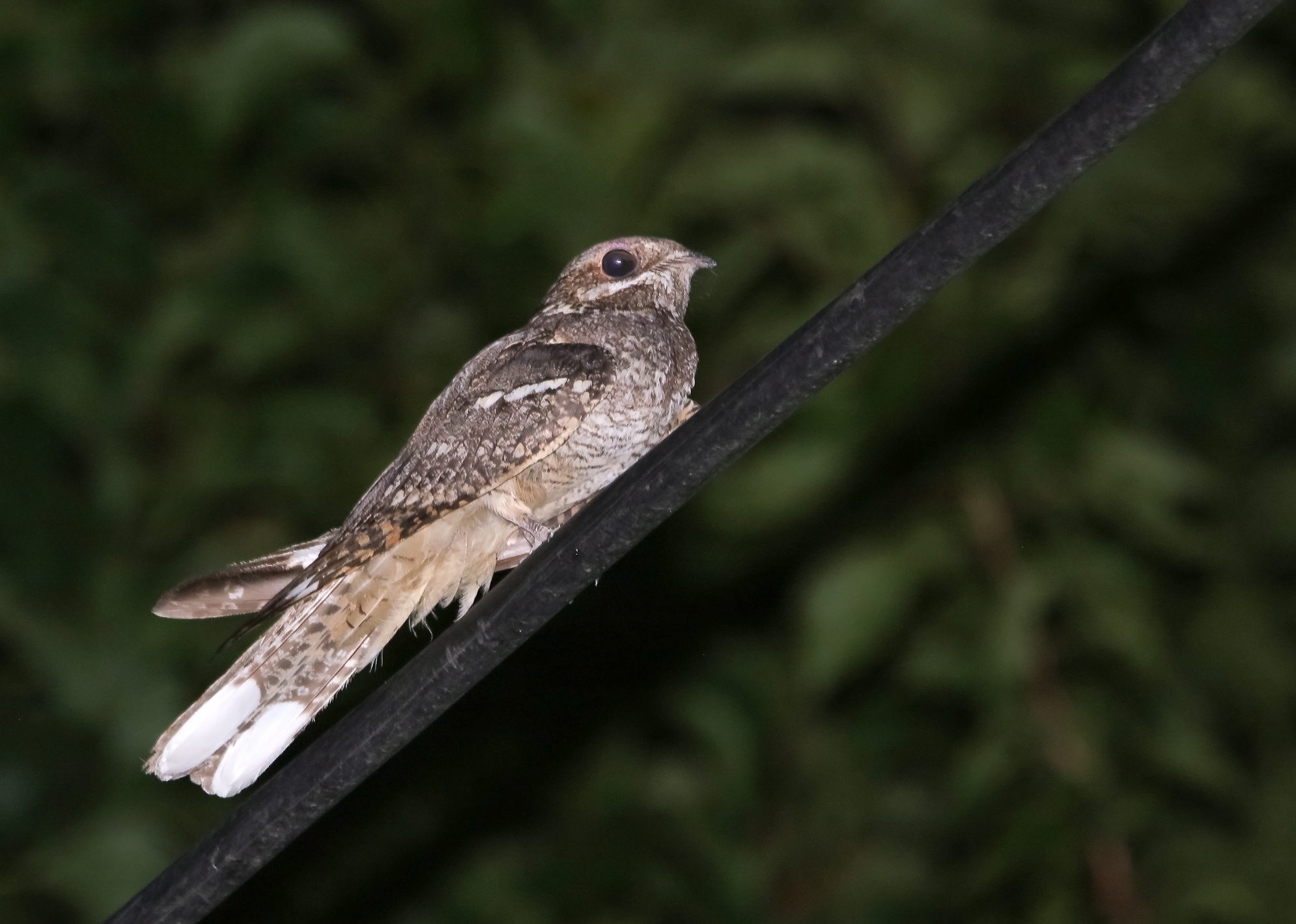
Eurasian nightjar.
