= The Wild Grounds =

Nature reserve in Hampshire, England

Coordinates: 50.805°N 1.178°W

- Site of Special Scientific Interest
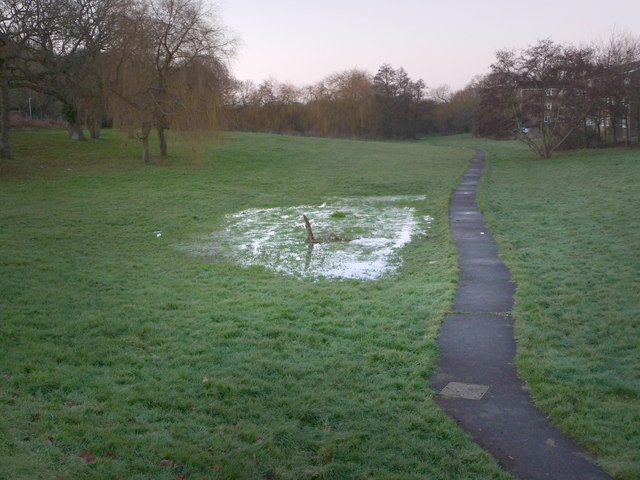
- Location of The Wild Grounds.
- Area of search: Hampshire
- Grid reference: SU 580 009
- Interest: Biological
- Area: 28.2 hectares (70 acres)
- Notification date: 1987
- Location map: Magic Map

The Wild Grounds is a 28.2-hectare (70-acre) biological Site of Special Scientific Interest in Gosport in Hampshire. It is also a Local Nature Reserve, which is owned and managed by Gosport Borough Council.

This site was probably common land until around 1600, after which it developed into woodland dominated by oak trees. It is not rich in flora, but is of great interest ecologically and historically for its natural origin and its structure, being composed of oak trees around 500 years of age which will be allowed to live their natural life span.

== Wildlife and fauna ==
Plant species in the Wild Ground include oak wall gasps and bluebells.

In terms of animals, emperor butterflies, meadow brown butterflies, gatekeeper butterflies, peacock butterflies, orange tip butterflies, green oak tortrix moths, woodpeckers, bats, owls, kestrels, buzzards, herons, kingfishers, ducks, squirrels, stag beetles, roe deer and foxes all live in the Wild Grounds.
