= Upper Greensand Hangers: Empshott to Hawkley =

Coordinates: 51.067°N 0.925°W

- Site of Special Scientific Interest
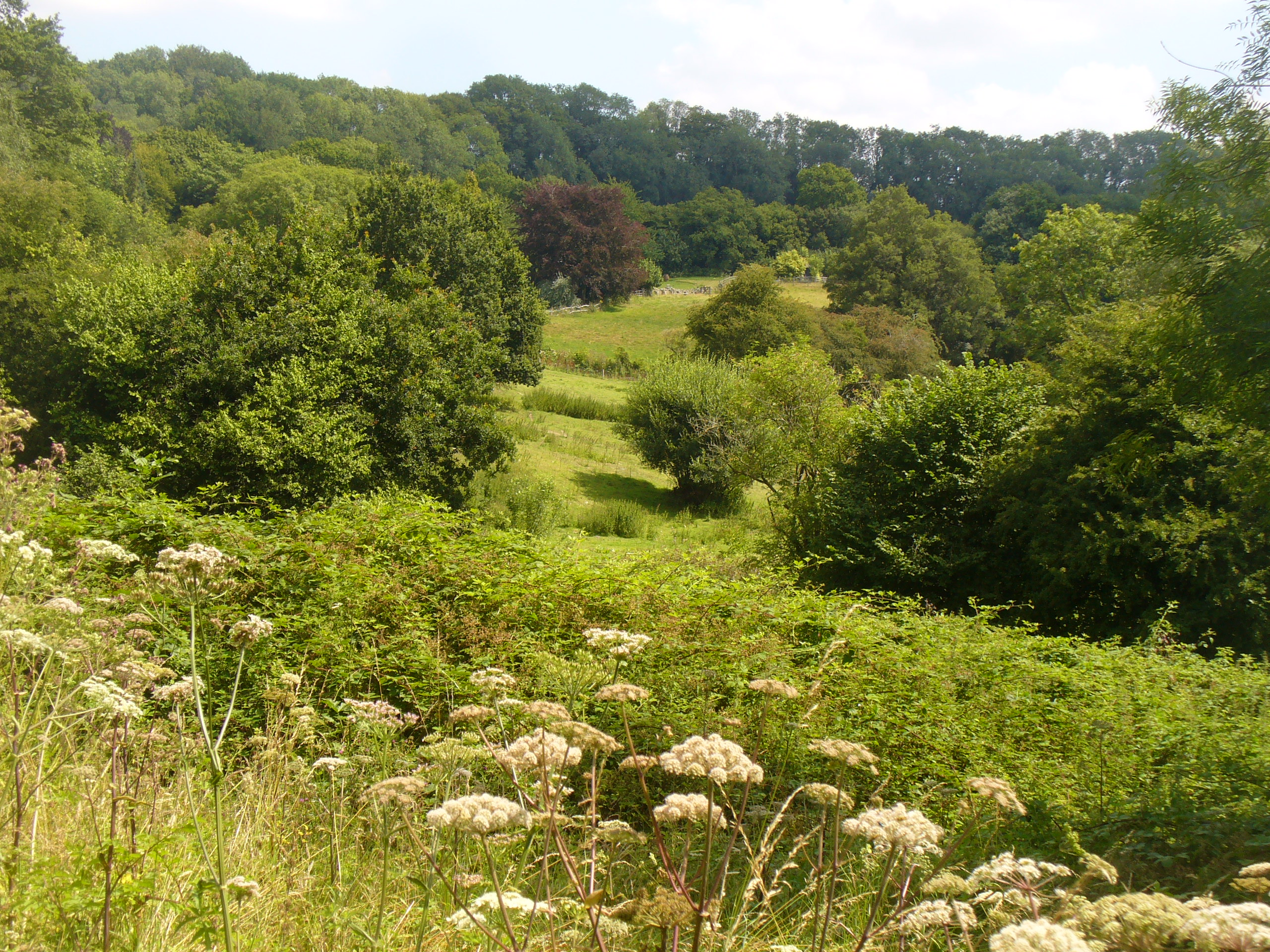
- Location of Upper Greensand Hangers: Empshott to Hawkley.
- Area of search: Hampshire
- Grid reference: SU 754 303
- Interest: Biological
- Area: 37.7 hectares (93 acres)
- Notification date: 1999
- Location map: Magic Map

Upper Greensand Hangers: Empshott to Hawkley is a 37.7-hectare (93-acre) biological Site of Special Scientific Interest north of Petersfield in Hampshire. It is part of the East Hampshire Hangers Special Area of Conservation.

This site comprises a number of woods along steep rocky slopes in the Upper Greensand. These conditions produce unusual lime-rich woodlands and specialised mosses and liverworts on the rocks. The dominant tree is ash, which has often been coppiced. The ground flora is diverse, including plants such as dog's mercury and yellow archangel.
