= Wick Wood and Worldham Hangers =

Protected area in Hampshire, England

Coordinates: 51.117°N 0.923°W

- Site of Special Scientific Interest
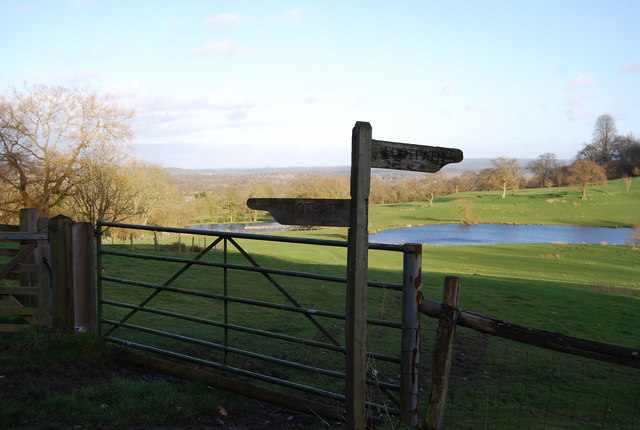
- Location of Wick Wood and Worldham Hangers.
- Area of search: Hampshire
- Grid reference: SU 755 359
- Interest: Biological
- Area: 91.8 hectares (227 acres)
- Notification date: 1988
- Location map: Magic Map

Wick Wood and Worldham Hangers is a 91.8-hectare (227-acre) biological Site of Special Scientific Interest west of Bordon in Hampshire. It is part of the East Hampshire Hangers Special Area of Conservation.

This site has ancient semi-natural woods on the steep slopes of the Upper Greensand and the adjacent gently sloping Gault Clay, with a number of springs at the junction of the two strata. The ground flora on the unstable upper slopes is sparse, but lower down it is rich and dominated by wild garlic. Two ponds add to the habitat diversity.
