= Gilkicker Lagoon =

Site of Special Scientific Interest in Gosport, Hampshire, England

- Site of Special Scientific Interest
- Location within the United Kingdom
- Location of Gilkicker Lagoon.
- Grid reference: SZ 608 977
- Coordinates: 50°46′34″N 1°08′18″W
- Interest: Biological
- Area: 4.07 ha (10.1 acres)
- Notification date: 18 December 1984; 41 years ago

Gilkicker Lagoon is a Site of Special Scientific Interest (SSSI) in Gosport, Hampshire, England. The SSSI covers 4.07 hectares.

There are five species of rare mollusc at the Lagoon.
