= Ratlake Meadows =

Coordinates: 51.010°N 1.411°W

- Site of Special Scientific Interest
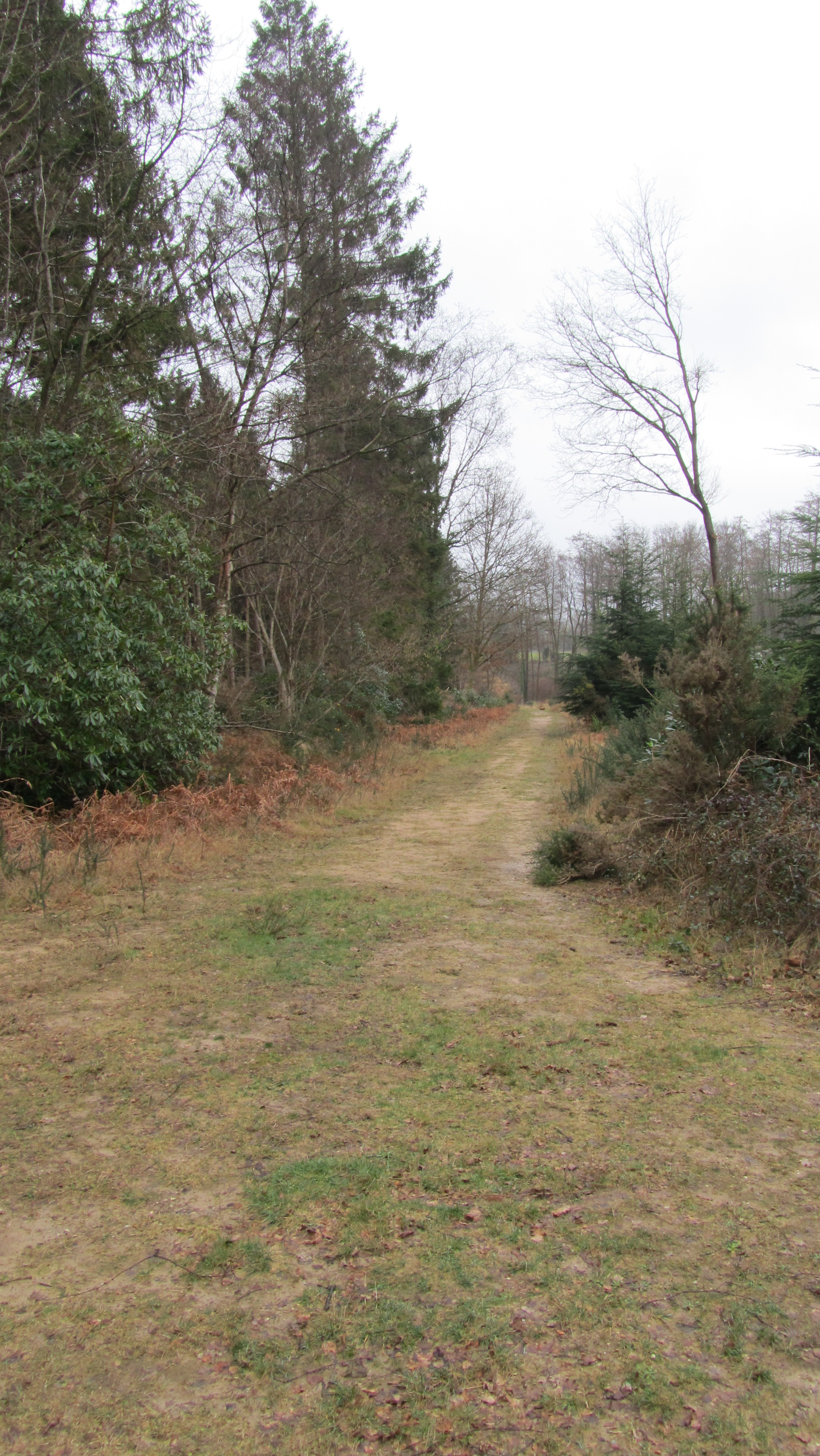
- Location of Ratlake Meadows.
- Area of search: Hampshire
- Grid reference: SU 414 236
- Interest: Biological
- Area: 4.2 hectares (10 acres)
- Notification date: 1986
- Location map: Magic Map

Ratlake Meadows is a 4.2-hectare (10-acre) biological Site of Special Scientific Interest north of Chandler's Ford in Hampshire.

These unimproved meadows on London Clay are recorded back to the sixteenth century and are probably much older. They are dominated by sweet vernal grass, heath grass, tufted hairgrass and Yorkshire fog, and have a rich variety of herbs. Invertebrates include the rare bush cricket, long-winged conehead.
