= Bere Mill Meadows =

Protected area in Hampshire, England

Coordinates: 51.227°N 1.320°W

- Site of Special Scientific Interest
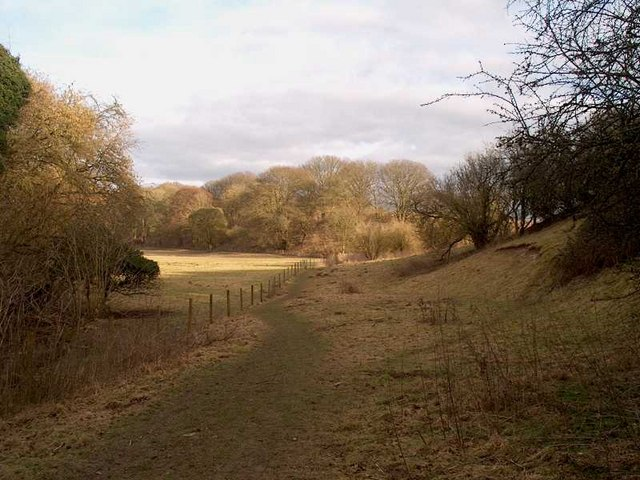
- Location of Bere Mill Meadows.
- Area of search: Hampshire
- Grid reference: SU 476 477
- Interest: Biological
- Area: 10.3 hectares (25 acres)
- Notification date: 1985
- Location map: Magic Map

Bere Mill Meadows is a 10.3-hectare (25-acre) biological Site of Special Scientific Interest east of Whitchurch in Hampshire.

These damp meadows in the flood plain of the River Test have a network of ditches with plants such as floating sweet-grass and lesser water-parsnip. The meadows have a rich variety of wet grassland herbs, including bogbean, ragged-robin, water avens, marsh valerian and southern marsh orchid.
