= Broxhead and Kingsley Commons =

UK Site of Special Scientific Interest

Coordinates: 51.133°N 0.858°W

- Site of Special Scientific Interest
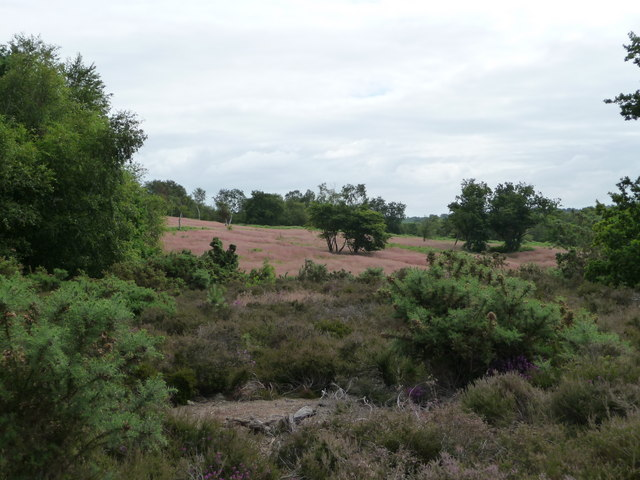
- Kingsley Common
- Location of Broxhead and Kingsley Commons.
- Area of search: Hampshire
- Grid reference: SU 800 377
- Interest: Biological
- Area: 105.1 hectares (260 acres)
- Notification date: 1993
- Location map: Magic Map

Broxhead and Kingsley Commons is a 105.1-hectare (260-acre) biological Site of Special Scientific Interest north of Lindford in Hampshire. It is part of Wealden Heaths Phase II Special Protection Area for the Conservation of Wild Birds and Broxhead Common is a 41.8-hectare (103-acre) Local Nature Reserve owned and managed by Hampshire County Council. Part of the land area designated Broxhead and Kingsley Commons SSSI is owned by the Ministry of Defence.

These commons have areas of heath, acid grassland, woodland and scrub. The site is one of the most important in southern Britain for lichens, with more than 25 terricolous species, and there are also three protected birds, 25 rare bees, wasps and ants, and the nationally rare sand lizard.
