= Eling and Bury Marshes =

Protected area in Hampshire, England

Coordinates: 50.909°N 1.469°W

- Site of Special Scientific Interest
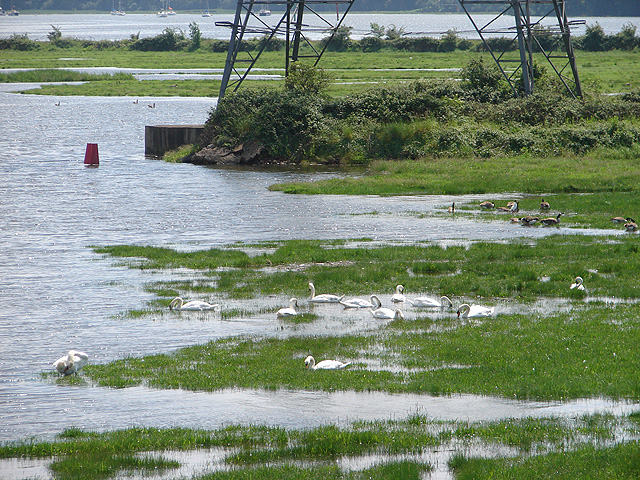
- Eling Great Marsh
- Location of Eling and Bury Marshes.
- Area of search: Hampshire
- Grid reference: SU 374 123
- Interest: Biological
- Area: 112.3 hectares (277 acres)
- Notification date: 1986
- Location map: Magic Map

Eling and Bury Marshes is a 112.3-hectare (277-acre) biological Site of Special Scientific Interest between Totton and Southampton in Hampshire. It is part of the Solent and Southampton Water Ramsar site and Special Protection Area, and of Solent Maritime Special Area of Conservation.

This site is composed of two dissimilar saltmarshes which are separated by intertidal mudflats. Eling Great Marsh is grazed and has a close sward, while Bury Marsh is ungrazed and has a more diverse flora. The site is part of Southampton Water, a tidal estuary that is nationally important for its populations of waders.
