= Chilbolton Common =

UK Site of Special Scientific Interest

Coordinates: 51.157°N 1.449°W

- Site of Special Scientific Interest
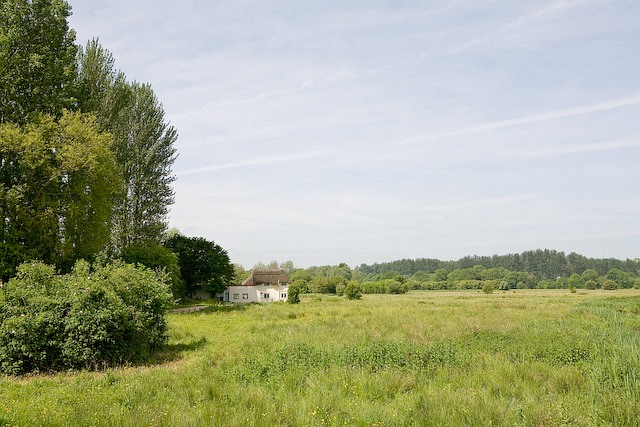
- Location of Chilbolton Common.
- Area of search: Hampshire
- Grid reference: SU 386 399
- Interest: Biological
- Area: 35.5 hectares (88 acres)
- Notification date: 1987
- Location map: Magic Map

Chilbolton Common is a 35.5-hectare (88-acre) biological Site of Special Scientific Interest in Chilbolton in Hampshire.

This site comprises a stretch of the River Test and its neighbouring flood plain. Habitats include marshy meadows, fen, willow carr and chalk downland. The flora is rich and diverse, with more than 265 species of flowering plant recorded, such as marsh arrowgrass, bog pimpernel, adders-tongue fern and early marsh-orchid.
