= Mottisfont Bats =

Protected area in Hampshire, England

Coordinates: 51.05139°N 1.55341°W

- Site of Special Scientific Interest
- Location of Mottisfont Bats.
- Area of search: Hampshire
- Grid reference: SU 313 280
- Interest: Biological
- Area: 196.7 hectares (486 acres)
- Notification date: 2003
- Location map: Magic Map

Mottisfont Bats is a 196.7-hectare (486-acre) biological Site of Special Scientific Interest west of Winchester in Hampshire. It is also a Special Area of Conservation.

The site consists of woods around Mottisfont, which supports a population of the barbastelle bat which is considered by Natural England to be of national importance. The site is used by the barbastelles for breeding, roosting, commuting and feeding. It is the only known maternity roost in Hampshire and one of only six known sites in the United Kingdom as of 2002. Eight other bat species have been recorded at Mottisfont: whiskered, brown long-eared, common and soprano pipistrelles, serotine, noctule, Daubenton's and Natterer's. Mottisfont contains a mix of woodland types including hazel coppice with standards, broadleaved plantation and coniferous plantation.
