= Rushmore and Conholt Downs =

Protected area in Hampshire, England

Coordinates: 51.290°N 1.510°W

- Site of Special Scientific Interest
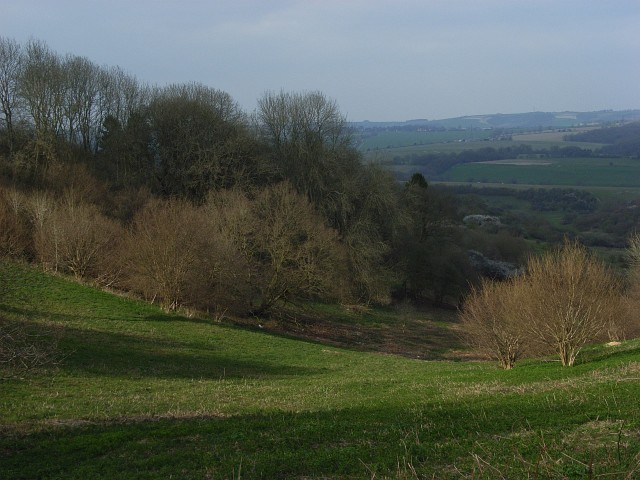
- Location of Rushmore and Conholt Downs.
- Area of search: Hampshire
- Grid reference: SU 343 546
- Interest: Biological
- Area: 111.5 hectares (276 acres)
- Notification date: 1984
- Location map: Magic Map

Rushmore and Conholt Downs is a 111.5-hectare (276-acre) biological Site of Special Scientific Interest north of Andover in Hampshire. It is a Nature Conservation Review site, Grade I.

These chalk downs have areas of grassland and scrub. There is also woodland, which is dominated by oak and ash with hazel coppice. A stand of juniper trees is over a hundred years old, and it is thought to be the oldest on chalk in England, with some trees over 6 metres (20 feet) tall.
