= Sidley Wood =

Coordinates: 51.297°N 1.422°W

- Site of Special Scientific Interest
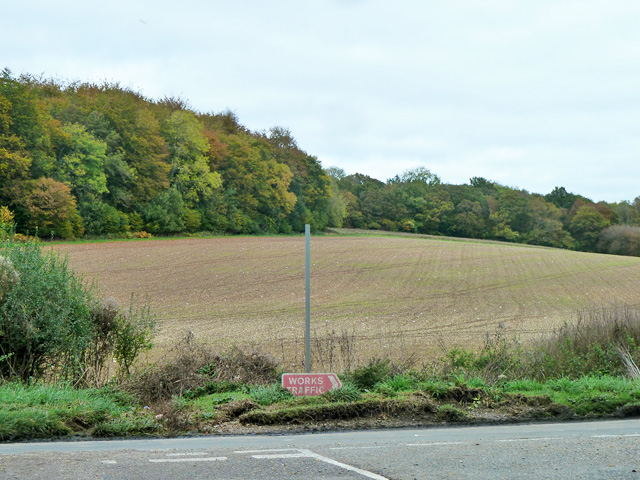
- Location of Sidley Wood.
- Area of search: Hampshire
- Grid reference: SU 404 555
- Interest: Biological
- Area: 11.7 hectares (29 acres)
- Notification date: 1988
- Location map: Magic Map

Sidley Wood is a 11.7-hectare (29-acre) biological Site of Special Scientific Interest north of Andover in Hampshire.

This south-facing secondary wood on chalk soil has many stands of ancient hornbeam coppice, some of more than 2 metres (6.6 feet) in diameter; no other comparable stands are known in south central England. Other trees are oak, field maple, ash and hazel.
