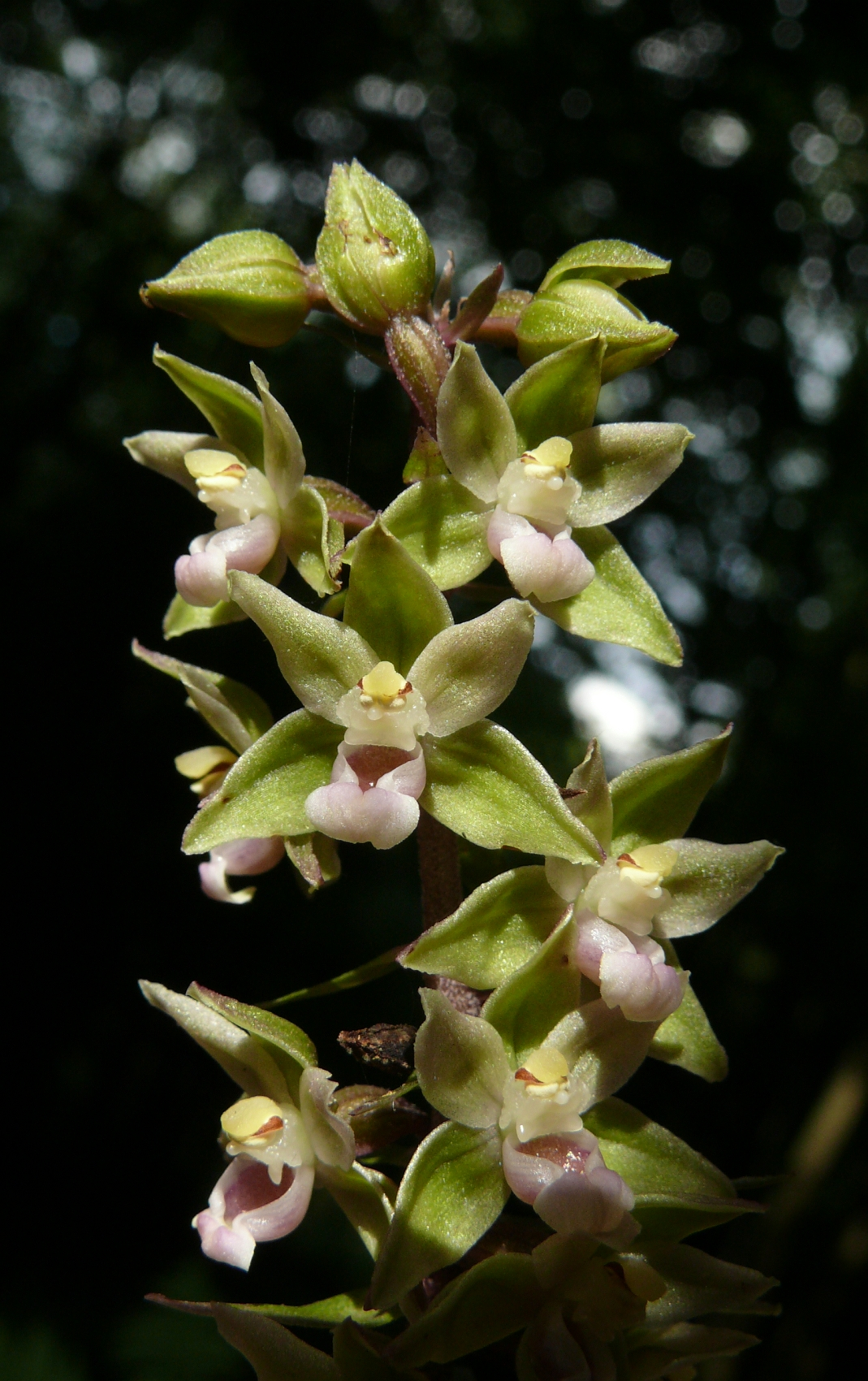

Scientific classification
- Kingdom: Plantae
- Clade: Tracheophytes
- Clade: Angiosperms
- Clade: Monocots
- Order: Asparagales
- Family: Orchidaceae
- Subfamily: Epidendroideae
- Genus: Epipactis
- Species: E. purpurata

Binomial name
- Epipactis purpurata Sm.

= Epipactis purpurata =

Species of orchid

Epipactis purpurata, the violet helleborine, is an orchid widely distributed in Europe.

== Distribution ==
It grows in Great Britain, Denmark, Spain, France, Belgium, Germany, Switzerland, Hungary, Austria, Czechoslovakia, Poland, Romania, Italy, Luxembourg, Estonia, Latvia, Lithuania, Kaliningrad, Russia, Slovenia, Croatia, Bulgaria, Greece, Ukraine, Crimea.
