= Headon Formation =

Gological formation in Hampshire, England

- Stratigraphic range: Bartonian
- Type: Formation
- Underlies: Bembridge Limestone
- Overlies: Barton Group
- Thickness: 65 m (213 ft)

Location
- Region: England
- Country: United Kingdom

Type section
- Named for: Headon Hill
- Location: Headon Hill & Whitecliff Bay

The Headon Formation is a geological formation found in Hampshire, England. It preserves fossils dating back to the Bartonian stage (Eocene).

== See also ==
- List of fossiliferous stratigraphic units in England
