= List of local nature reserves in Hampshire =

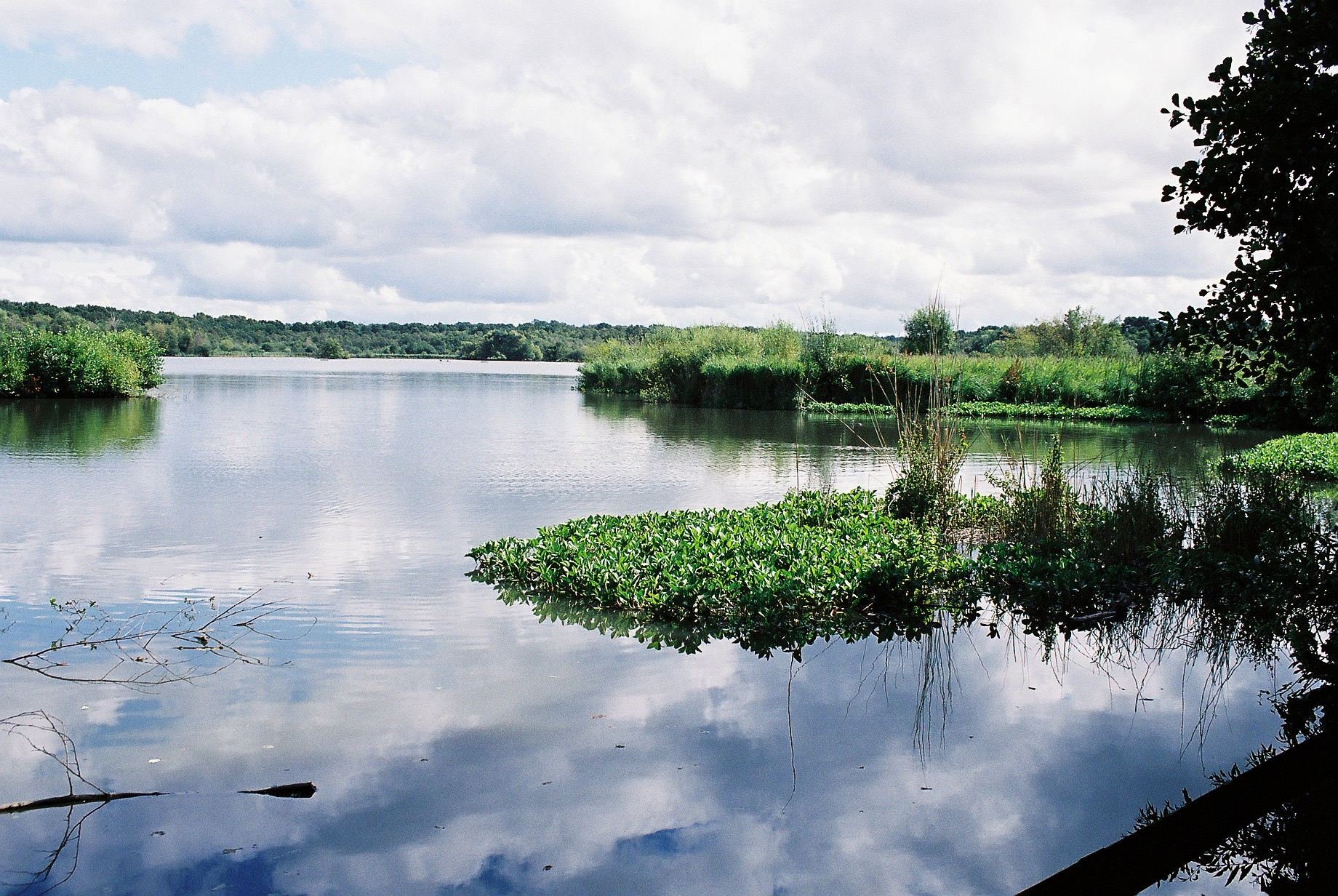
Fleet Pond

Local nature reserves (LNRs) in England are designated by local authorities under Section 21 of the National Parks and Access to the Countryside Act 1949. LNRs are sites which have a special local interest either biologically or geologically. Local authorities have a duty to care for them, and must control the sites by owning or leasing them, or by having an agreement with the owners. The local authorities can apply local byelaws to manage and protect LNRs.

As of April 2020, there are 65 LNRs in Hampshire, of which 28 are Sites of Special Scientific Interest, 15 are Ramsar sites, 15 are Special Areas of Conservation, 16 are Special Protection Areas and one is a national nature reserve and one is a Nature Conservation Review site. Two sites are managed by the Hampshire and Isle of Wight Wildlife Trust.

== Key ==
=== Other designations and wildlife trust management ===
- HIWWT = Hampshire and Isle of Wight Wildlife Trust
- NCR = Nature Conservation Review site
- NNR = National nature reserve
- Ramsar = Ramsar site, an internationally important wetland site
- SAC = Special Area of Conservation
- SM = Scheduled monument
- SPA = Special Protection Area
- SSSI = Site of Special Scientific Interest

== Sites ==
| Site | Photograph | Area (Note: The area is taken from the Natural England map of each site. (Click on the identify icon (i) in the "Feature Tools" and then click on the site.)) | Location (Note: The location is taken from the Natural England details page for the site.) | Borough | Other | Map (Note: The maps are on the Natural England database of local nature reserves.) and details (Note: Details are on the pages on each site in the Natural England database of local nature reserves.) | Description |
|---|---|---|---|---|---|---|---|
| Anton Lakes | Anton Lakes | 33.1 hectares (82 acres) | Andover; 51.220°N 1.486°W; SU 360 469 | Test Valley | | Map Details | The River Anton rises in the site and flows through former watercress beds into the lakes, which were created by gravel extraction. Another habitat is chalk grassland, which has butterflies such as marbled white and gatekeeper. There is also an area of wet meadow, and mammals include otters and water voles. |
| Berry Coppice | | 3.0 hectares (7.4 acres) | Winchester; 50.871°N 1.231°W; SU 542 082 | Winchester | | Map Details | |
| Bishops Waltham Branch | Bishops Waltham Branch | 1.6 hectares (4.0 acres) | Bishop's Waltham; 50.950°N 1.223°W; SU 547 170 | Winchester | | Map Details | This site is a 1 kilometre (0.62 miles) footpath along the former railway line from Bishop's Waltham to Botley. The path is lined by trees such as oaks and field maples, and flowering plants including wood avens and herb robert. |
| Boldre Foreshore | Boldre Foreshore | 193.3 hectares (478 acres) | Boldre; 50.752°N 1.497°W; SZ 356 948 | New Forest | HIWWT, Ramsar, SAC, SPA, SSSI | Map Details | This large site has a vartiety of habitats, including saltmarsh, shingle, grassland, fresh and brackish pools and mudflats. It has breeding populations of gulls, terns and waders, together with many wintering waders and wildfowl. |
| Brook Meadow (Emsworth) | Brook Meadow (Emsworth) | 3.9 hectares (9.6 acres) | Emsworth; 50.849°N 0.936°W; SU 750 060 | Havant | | Map Details | Most of this site is grassland, which is surrounded by woodland and flanked by two streams. The diverse wildlife includes water voles. |
| Broxhead Common, Bordon | Broxhead Common | 41.8 hectares (103 acres) | Bordon; 51.132°N 0.849°W; SU 806 376 | East Hampshire | SPA, SSSI | Map Details | The common has dry heath and birch and oak woodland. Woodlarks and nightjars, which are rare and protected birds, breed on the site, and there is also a population of the nationally rare sand lizard. |
| Buriton Chalk Pit | Buriton Chalk Pit | 5.7 hectares (14 acres) | Buriton; 50.973°N 0.955°W; SU 735 198 | East Hampshire | | Map Details | This former chalk quarry was worked up to the end of World War II and it still has large heaps of spoil. It has gradually developed into a rich habitat with chalk loving plants. Many paths follow the routes of narrow gauge railway lines which were used to move chalk and lime. |
| Calshot Marshes | Calshot Marshes | 51.1 hectares (126 acres) | Southampton; 50.818°N 1.316°W; SU 483 023 | Southampton | Ramsar, SAC, SPA, SSSI | Map Details | This saltmarsh site is internationally important for dark-bellied brent geese and nationally important for wigeon, teal, ringed plover, grey plover, black-tailed godwit, redshank and dunlin. |
| Catherington Down | Catherington Down | 12.8 hectares (32 acres) | Horndean; 50.924°N 1.018°W; SU 691 143 | East Hampshire | SSSI | Map Details | This western sloping site is chalk grassland with prominent lynchet strips dating to the Middle Ages. It is managed by grazing and has a variety of chalk herbs, such as pyramidal orchid, round-headed rampion and autumn lady's-tresses. There is also a narrow belt of woodland. |
| Catherington Lith, Horndean | | 9.2 hectares (23 acres) | Horndean; 50.922°N 1.004°W; SU 701 141 | East Hampshire | | Map Details | |
| Chessel Bay | Chessel Bay | 12.9 hectares (32 acres) | Southampton; 50.913°N 1.376°W; SU 440 128 | Southampton | Ramsar, SPA, SSSI | Map Details | This is the last remaining stretch of undeveloped shoreline along the lower River Itchen. Most of it is mudflats, which provide feeding grounds for birds at low tide. There are also areas of saltmarsh, woodland and shingle. |
| Chineham Woods | | 9.2 hectares (23 acres) | Basingstoke; 51.292°N 1.059°W; SU 657 552 | Basingstoke and Deane | | Map Details | |
| Claylands | Claylands | 5.8 hectares (14 acres) | Bishop's Waltham; 50.959°N 1.223°W; SU 547 180 | Winchester | | Map Details | This former clay working has woodland, ponds, meadows and scrub. The ponds have populations of great crested newts. There are butterflies such as marbled white, common blue and green hairstreak. |
| Crab Wood | Crab Wood | 37.8 hectares (93 acres) | Winchester; 51.065°N 1.378°W; SU 437 297 | Winchester | SSSI | Map Details | This site has been wooded at least since the sixteenth century. It has a hazel layer which has been coppiced, large oaks and some beech, ash and birch trees. There is a rich butterfly fauna, including purple emperors. |
| Danebury Hillfort | Danebury Hillfort | 39.0 hectares (96 acres) | Nether Wallop; 51.137°N 1.535°W; SU 326 376 | Test Valley | SSSI | Map Details | This Iron Age hillfort has been the subject of extensive research and excavation. It was occupied from the seventh to the first centuries BC, with many phases of development. There are large beech around the perimeter. |
| Daneshill Park Woods | Daneshill Park Woods | 4.4 hectares (11 acres) | Basingstoke; 51.280°N 1.059°W; SU 657 538 | Basingstoke and Deane | | Map Details | These woods have hazel coppice, an old orchard, scrub and a sunken lane. Ground flora include wood anemone, celandine and bluebells. |
| Deadwater Valley | Deadwater Valley | 35.9 hectares (89 acres) | Bordon; 51.107°N 0.857°W; SU 801 348 | East Hampshire | SM | Map Details | This site along the west bank of the River Deadwater has a pond, a meadow, wet and dry heath, alder carr and broadleaved and coniferous woodland. There are Civil War earthworks in the south of the reserve. |
| Dell Piece West | | 4.1 hectares (10 acres) | Horndean; 50.909°N 1.006°W; SU 700 126 | East Hampshire | | Map Details | |
| Dundridge Meadows | Dundridge Meadows | 7.5 hectares (19 acres) | Bishop's Waltham; 50.960°N 1.200°W; SU 563 181 | Winchester | | Map Details | These meadows are chalk grassland managed for hay. There are also two ponds, ancient woodlands and species-rich hedges. Flowering plants include cowslips and hayrattle. |
| Elvetham Heath | Elvetham Heath | 20.0 hectares (49 acres) | Fleet; 51.295°N 0.847°W; SU 805 557 | Hart | | Map Details | Typical heathland plants such as heather and gorse are regenerating naturally on the heath, and there are other habitats such as reedbeds and wet woodland, which has the rare plant bog myrtle. |
| Farlington Marshes | Farlington Marshes | 119.7 hectares (296 acres) | Portsmouth; 50.834°N 1.029°W; SU 685 043 | Portsmouth | HIWWT NCR, Ramsar SAC, SPA, SSSI | Map Details | This area of flower-rich grazing marsh is internationally important for its bird population. Wintering wildfowl include dark bellied brent geese, wigeons, avocets, redshanks and dunlins. There are also spring and summer visitors such as Cetti's, reed and sedge warblers, skylarks and lapwings. |
| Fleet Pond | Fleet Pond | 48.3 hectares (119 acres) | Fleet; 51.288°N 0.824°W; SU 821 550 | Hart | SSSI | Map Details | This large and shallow lake is surrounded by reed beds, alder carr and oak and birch woodland. The lake has a rich aquatic flora and fauna, including large populations of reed warblers and other wetland birds. |
| Gull Coppice | | 12.7 hectares (31 acres) | Fareham; 50.881°N 1.255°W; SU 525 093 | Fareham | | Map Details | |
| Gutner Point | Gutner Point | 69.0 hectares (171 acres) | Hayling Island; 50.809°N 0.954°W; SU 738 016 | Basingstoke and Deane | Ramsar SAC SPA, SSSI | Map Details | This site in Chichester Harbour has inter-tidal muds, grassland and saltmarsh. Flora includes sea-lavender. Many birds feed on invertebrates in the mud at low tide and rest on foreshore at high tide. |
| Hackett's Marsh | Hackett's Marsh | 20.4 hectares (50 acres) | Fareham; 50.878°N 1.308°W; SU 488 089 | Fareham | Ramsar, SAC, SPA, SSSI | Map Details | This site has saltmarshes and species-rich grassland. Its diverse insects, which include some species which are nationally rare, provide an important source of food for waders, such as golden plovers, black-tailed godwits and curlews. |
| Hayling Billy | Hayling Billy | 42.0 hectares (104 acres) | Hayling Island; 50.812°N 0.987°W; SU 715 019 | Havant | Ramsar, SAC, SPA, SSSI | Map Details | This is a footpath along the former Hayling Island branch railway line along the eastern shore of Langstone Harbour between Havant and South Hayling. |
| Hazleton Common, Horndean | Hazleton Common, Horndean | 17.5 hectares (43 acres) | Horndean; 50.902°N 1.001°W; SU 703 119 | East Hampshire | | Map Details | The common is mainly lowland heath, together with ponds and areas of woodland. Fauna include common lizards, adders, grass snake, slow worms, broad-bodied chaser dragonflies, green woodpeckers and partridges. |
| Herbert Plantation | Herbert Plantation | 25.6 hectares (63 acres) | Newtown; 51.357°N 1.318°W; SU 476 622 | Basingstoke and Deane | | Map Details | The reserve is named after its former owner, Herbert Fox, who died in World War II. It has oak, birch, alder and pine, and ground flora includes some species typical of ancient woodland, such as common solomon's-seal and wood sorrel. Invertebrates include 22 species of butterfly, such as silver-washed fritillary and white admiral. |
| Hocombe Mead | Hocombe Mead | 8.3 hectares (21 acres) | Chandler's Ford; 51.001°N 1.389°W; SU 430 226 | Eastleigh | | Map Details | The site has two species-rich meadows. The north one, which is grazed by cattle, has a large colony of ringlet butterflies, while the south one is maintained by cutting. There are also woods, with some parts more than 400 years old. There are small areas of bog and heath. |
| Holly Hill Woodland Park | Holly Hill Woodland Park | 28.1 hectares (69 acres) | Fareham; 50.866°N 1.297°W; SU 496 076 | Fareham | | Map Details | The park has landscaped areas with lakes, waterfalls, islands and woods with exotic trees and flowers, as well as native trees such as oaks. There is also a less formal area of ancient semi-natural woodland. |
| Hook with Warsash | Hook with Warsash | 251.6 hectares (622 acres) | Fareham; 50.843°N 1.300°W; SU 494 051 | Fareham | Ramsar, SAC SPA, SSSI | Map Details | This nature reserve on the banks of the River Hamble and Southampton Water has diverse habitats, intertidal mud, saltmarsh, grazing marsh, reedbed, scrapes, shingle and woodland. Flora include sea kale, yellow horned poppy, slender hare's ear, marsh marigold, English stonecrop and wild carrot. |
| The Kench, Hayling Island | The Kench, Hayling Island | 6.0 hectares (15 acres) | Hayling Island; 50.793°N 1.020°W; SZ 692 997 | Havant | Ramsar, SAC, SPA, SSSI | Map Details | This site on the south shore of Langstone Harbour is an area of saltmarsh and intertidal mud. Birds use the mud as a feeding area at low tide and roost on a shingle ridge during high tide. |
| Kites Croft | | 17.0 hectares (42 acres) | Fareham; 50.856°N 1.251°W; SU 528 065 | Fareham | | Map Details | |
| Lepe Point | | 4.5 hectares (11 acres) | Exbury; 50.786°N 1.357°W; SZ 454 987 | New Forest | SSSI | Map Details | |
| Liss Riverside Railway Walk North | Liss Riverside Railway Walk North | 6.9 hectares (17 acres) | Liss; 51.051°N 0.890°W; SU 779 285 | East Hampshire | | Map Details | This footpath follows part of the route of the former Longmoor Military Railway from Liss to Liss Forest. The path goes through willow and alder woodland. |
| Liss Riverside Railway Walk South | Liss Riverside Railway Walk South | 1.6 hectares (4.0 acres) | Liss; 51.045°N 0.893°W; SU 777 279 | East Hampshire | | Map Details | This footpath through woodland is the southern continuation of Liss Riverside Railway Walk North, following the route of the former Longmoor Military Railway. |
| Lymington-Keyhaven Marshes | Keyhaven Marshes | 167.9 hectares (415 acres) | Lymington; 50.736°N 1.542°W; SZ 324 930 | New Forest | HIWWT, Ramsar, SAC, SPA, SSSI | Map Details | This coastal site has saltmarshes and intertidal muds. Birds of prey include peregrine falcons, marsh harriers and merlins, while black-headed gulls and sandwich terns feed on fish in the marshes. Yellow-horned poppies, sea campions and sea aster grow in the salty mud. |
| Manor Farm | Manor Farm | 144.1 hectares (356 acres) | Botley; 50.900°N 1.289°W; SU 501 114 | Eastleigh | Ramsar, SAC, SPA, SSSI | Map Details | This large country park on the north bank of the River Hamble has woodland with roe deer and meadows with wild flowers and skylarks. |
| Mercury Marshes | Mercury Marshes | 6.4 hectares (16 acres) | Hamble-le-Rice; 50.866°N 1.311°W; SU 486 076 | Eastleigh | Ramsar, SAC, SPA, SSSI | Map Details | This site on the west bank of the River Hamble has intertidal mud, reedbeds, islands, saltmarsh, creeks and woodland. The saltmarsh and islands are dominated by sea purslane, cordgrass, sea aster and glasswort. The reserve is important for invertebrates and waders. |
| Milford on Sea LNR | Milford on Sea LNR | 20.6 hectares (51 acres) | Milford on Sea; 50.728°N 1.606°W; SZ 279 921 | New Forest | | Map Details | The Danes Stream runs through this nature reserve, which has ancient woodland, grassland and winding paths. |
| The Mill Field | The Mill Field | 11.7 hectares (29 acres) | Basingstoke; 51.276°N 1.051°W; SU 663 534 | Basingstoke and Deane | | Map Details | The field has a large area of grassland together with scrub and hedgerows. There are water voles and dormice, while insects include waved black, lunar yellow underwing and water carpet moths and marbled white butterflies. |
| Miller's Pond | Miller's Pond | 8.1 hectares (20 acres) | Southampton; 50.896°N 1.360°W; SU 451 109 | Southampton | | Map Details | he pond is managed for both angling and wildlife. There are also areas of acid grassland and semi-natural woodland. |
| The Moors, Bishop's Waltham | The Moors, Bishops Waltham | 14.5 hectares (36 acres) | Bishop's Waltham; 50.950°N 1.204°W; SU 560 170 | Winchester | SSSI | Map Details | These unimproved wet meadows and alder carr drain into Mill Pond at the centre of the site. The meadows have a rich and diverse flora, dominated by greater pond sedge in wetter areas, while there are plants such as purple moor-grass and meadow foxtail in drier parts. |
| Netley Common | Netley Common | 12.8 hectares (32 acres) | Southampton; 50.903°N 1.324°W; SU 476 117 | Southampton | | Map Details | This lowland heath site also has areas of grassland, woods, scrub and gorse. Reptiles include common lizards and adders. A Roman road crosses the site, and there is also a Bronze Age barrow. |
| Oxenbourne Down, Clanfield | Oxenbourne Down, Clanfield | 84.8 hectares (210 acres) | Buriton; 50.966°N 0.986°W; SU 713 190 | East Hampshire | SAC, SSSI | Map Details | This is part of Queen Elizabeth Country Park. It has unimproved grassland on low fertility soils, which is controlled by grazing. There are also areas of ancient semi-natural woodland. |
| Pamber Forest | Pamber Forest | 190.1 hectares (470 acres) | Tadley; 51.342°N 1.118°W; SU 615 607 | Basingstoke and Deane | HIWWT, SSSI | Map Details | Pamber Forest has hazel coppice dominated by oak standards. At the southern end are plants associated with ancient woodland, such as orpine, wood horsetail, lily of the valley, wild daffodil and the rare mountain fern. The woodland has over forty nationally rare or uncommon species. |
| Popley Ponds | Popley Ponds | 1.4 hectares (3.5 acres) | Basingstoke; 51.286°N 1.087°W; SU 638 545 | Basingstoke and Deane | | Map Details | This former quarry is now a pond which has a diverse range of amphibians, including great crested newts. There is also an area of woodland. |
| Rotherlands | Rotherlands | 7.6 hectares (19 acres) | Petersfield; 51.008°N 0.911°W; SU 765 237 | East Hampshire | | Map Details | The River Rother and its tributary, Tilmore Brook, runs through this reserve, and it also has unmanaged grassland, wetland, woodland and scrub. Fauna include badgers, otters and crayfish. |
| Round Coppice | | 6.4 hectares (16 acres) | Winchester; 50.881°N 1.248°W; SU 530 093 | Winchester | | Map Details | |
| Sandy Point | | 18.3 hectares (45 acres) | Hayling Island; 50.779°N 0.940°W; SZ 748 982 | Havant | Ramsar SPA, SSSI | Map Details | |
| Shawford Down | Shawford Down | 19.7 hectares (49 acres) | Winchester; 51.021°N 1.331°W; SU 470 248 | Winchester | | Map Details | The down has strip lynchets, dating to the period in the Middle Ages when the area was cultivated as common land. The site has a range of chalk grassland habitats, with flora including wild parsnip, red bartsia, cowslip and common rock-rose. There are also areas of woodland and scrub. |
| Shortheath Common | Shortheath Common | 57.8 hectares (143 acres) | Whitehill; 51.124°N 0.894°W; SU 775 367 | East Hampshire | SAC, SSSI | Map Details | The common has areas of bracken, woodland, heath and a pond, but its main ecological interest is a large valley mire. Much of it is covered by Sphagnum mosses, but there are also many vascular plants, such as velvet bent and the insectivorous round-leaved sundew. The invertebrates are also of particular interest, including 23 breeding species of dragonfly. |
| Sturt Pond | Sturt Pond | 10.9 hectares (27 acres) | Milford on Sea; 50.721°N 1.585°W; SZ 294 913 | New Forest | Ramsar, SAC, SPA, SSSI | Map Details | Sturt Pond itself is tidal, and the reserve also includes Dane Stream, reedbeds, lagoons and saltmarsh. These habitats attract many birds, and there is also an area of grassland which is grazed by New Forest ponies. |
| Tadburn Meadows | Tadburn Meadows | 5.1 hectares (13 acres) | Romsey; 50.992°N 1.476°W; SU 369 215 | Test Valley | | Map Details | The Tadburn Stream runs through this valley site, which has wet willow and alder woodland lower down and dry habitats higher up. Fauna include green woodpeckers, kingfishers and water voles. There is grassland south of the stream. |
| Titchfield Haven | Titchfield Haven | 93.0 hectares (230 acres) | Fareham; 50.823°N 1.240°W; SU 536 029 | Fareham | NNR, Ramsar, SPA, SSSI | Map Details | This was formerly a tidal estuary, but one way valves block salt water and it is now freshwater river and marshes, wet meadows bisected by ditches, and fen. It is important for wetland breeding birds, such as bearded reedlings, sedge warblers and reed warblers. |
| Up Nately LNR | Up Nately LNR | 2.8 hectares (6.9 acres) | Up Nately; 51.264°N 0.997°W; SU 701 521 | Basingstoke and Deane | SSSI | Map Details | This is a section of the Basingstoke Canal between Up Nately and the Greywell Tunnel. There is water in the canal and the towpath is a public footpath. |
| Valley Park Woodlands | Valley Park Woodlands | 24.8 hectares (61 acres) | Chandler's Ford; 50.981°N 1.406°W; SU 418 204 | Eastleigh | | Map Details | This site has ancient woods, coppice, glades, woodland rides, rough grassland and ponds. |
| Warsash Common | | 23.4 hectares (58 acres) | Warsash; 50.850°N 1.288°W; SU 502 058 | Fareham | | Map Details | |
| Wealden Edge Hangers | Wealden Edge Hangers | 48.0 hectares (119 acres) | Hawkley; 51.050°N 0.959°W; SU 731 284 | East Hampshire | SAC SSSI | Map Details | Natural England describes this site as "arguably,... one of the ecologically most interesting and diverse series of chalk woodlands in Britain". The rich ground flora includes many rare species, and 289 species of vascular plants have been recorded. There are more than 111 species of bryophytes and the lichen flora is the second richest in the country with 74 species. |
| West Hayling | West Hayling | 76.2 hectares (188 acres) | Bedhampton; 50.826°N 0.989°W; SU 713 034 | Havant | Ramsar, RSPB, SAC, SPA, SSSI | Map Details | This site has large areas of intertidal mudflats and lagoons with vast numbers of marine invertebrates, which provide food for tens of thousands of wintering and breeding birds. |
| West of the River Alver | West of the River Alver | 11.6 hectares (29 acres) | Gosport; 50.798°N 1.178°W; SU 580 001 | Gosport | | Map Details | This site on the west bank of the River Alver has a reedbed which is one of the largest in England, and which is maintained by annual cutting. There are also three ponds and areas of grassland, some of which are kept short by rabbit grazing. Seventeen species of butterfly have been recorded. |
| Westwood Woodland Park | Westwood Woodland Park | 49.5 hectares (122 acres) | Southampton; 50.883°N 1.356°W; SU 454 095 | Southampton | | Map Details | In the Middle Ages this park was part of the estate of Netley Abbey. Its habitats include ancient woodland, with haze coppice and oaks, streams, ponds, marshes and grassland. There are several rare beetles, and birds include barn owls, skylarks, linnets and meadow pipits. |
| The Wild Grounds | The Wild Grounds | 28.4 hectares (70 acres) | Gosport; 50.805°N 1.178°W; SU 580 009 | Gosport | SSSI | Map Details | This site was probably common land until around 1600, after which it developed into woodland dominated by oak trees. It is not rich in flora, but is of great interest ecologically and historically for its natural origin and its structure, being composed of old trees of uneven age which will be allowed to live their natural life span. |
| Yoell's Copse | Yoell's Copse | 5.5 hectares (14 acres) | Horndean; 50.911°N 1.021°W; SU 689 129 | East Hampshire | | Map Details | This ancient wood has coppiced mature oak trees and wild service trees. There are uncommon plants such as butcher's-broom and common cow-wheat. |
| Zebon Copse | | 7.8 hectares (19 acres) | Fleet; 51.260°N 0.855°W; SU 800 518 | Hart | | Map Details | |

== See also ==
- List of Sites of Special Scientific Interest in Hampshire
- Hampshire and Isle of Wight Wildlife Trust

== Sources ==
- Ratcliffe, Derek, ed. (1977). A Nature Conservation Review. Vol. 2. Cambridge, UK: Cambridge University Press. ISBN 978-0-521-21403-2.
