= Alder carr =

Waterlogged wooded terrain

An alder carr is a particular type of carr, i.e. waterlogged wooded terrain populated with alder trees. They can be found across the United Kingdom, sometimes attracting ash trees should they become drier. Many have developed alongside streams in the New Forest, where the Alder's capacity to thrive in a water logged environment allows them to become the dominant species of tree in these areas. The presence of particular bacteria, Frankia alni, enables their root systems to extract nitrogen from the air, thus making up for the lack of nitrogen in waterlogged soil.

Alder carrs have often been coppiced, whereby cutting away growth at ground level encourages new trunks to grow at ground level. This means the wood can be repeatedly harvested. This wood can then be used to make water pipes, wooden pumps, as well as piles under bridges. Other uses have included charcoal for making gun powder, and filters for gas masks.

== Examples ==
- Alder Carr, Hildersham
- Alderfen Broad
- Fawley Ford on the Beaulieu River
- Biebrza National Park
- Blackwater Valley
- Deadwater Valley
- Fen Alder Carr
- Fleet Pond
- Harston Wood
- Herbert Plantation
- Holywells Park, Ipswich: Pond 5 is known as Alder Carr and is a biodiversity action plan habitat. Historically there was another Alder Carr in the Cobbold family estate in what is now the northern edge of the Landseer Park.
- Jackson's Coppice and Marsh
- Liss Riverside Railway Walk North
- Loynton Moss
- The Moors, Bishop's Waltham
- Newbourne Springs
- Tadburn Meadows

== Gallery ==
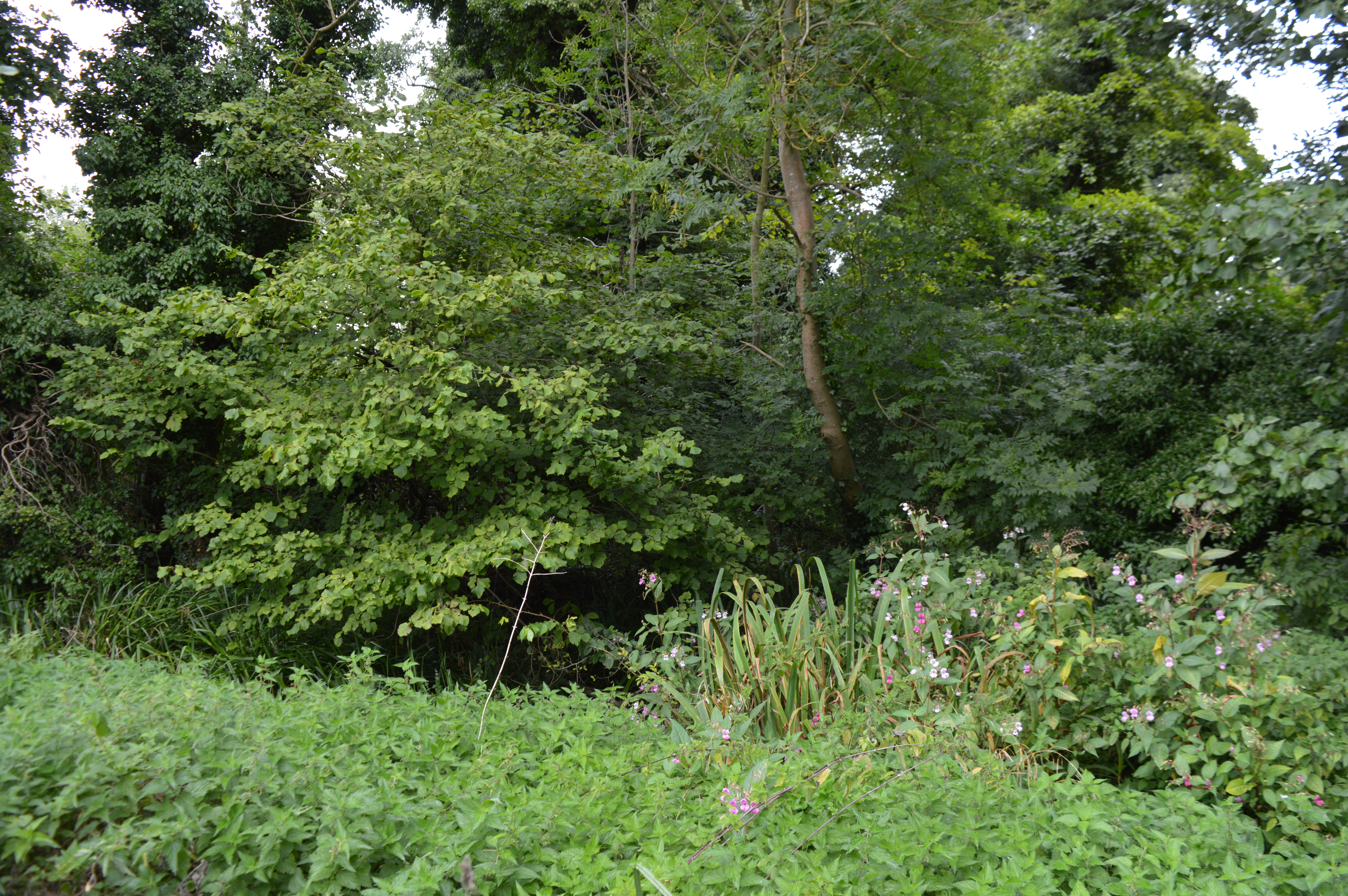
Alder Carr, Hildersham

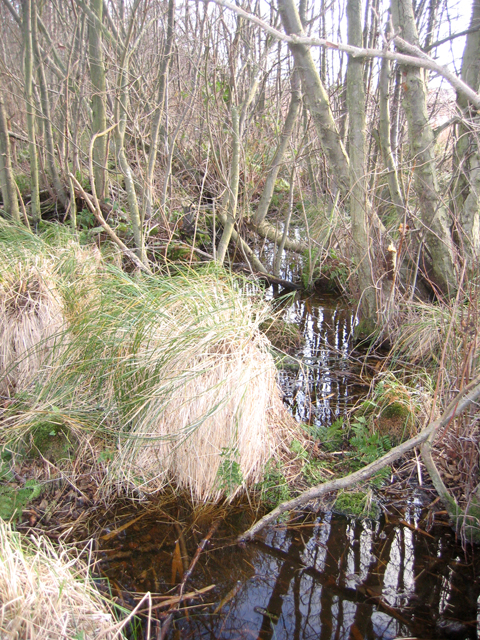
Alderfen Broad Nature Reserve

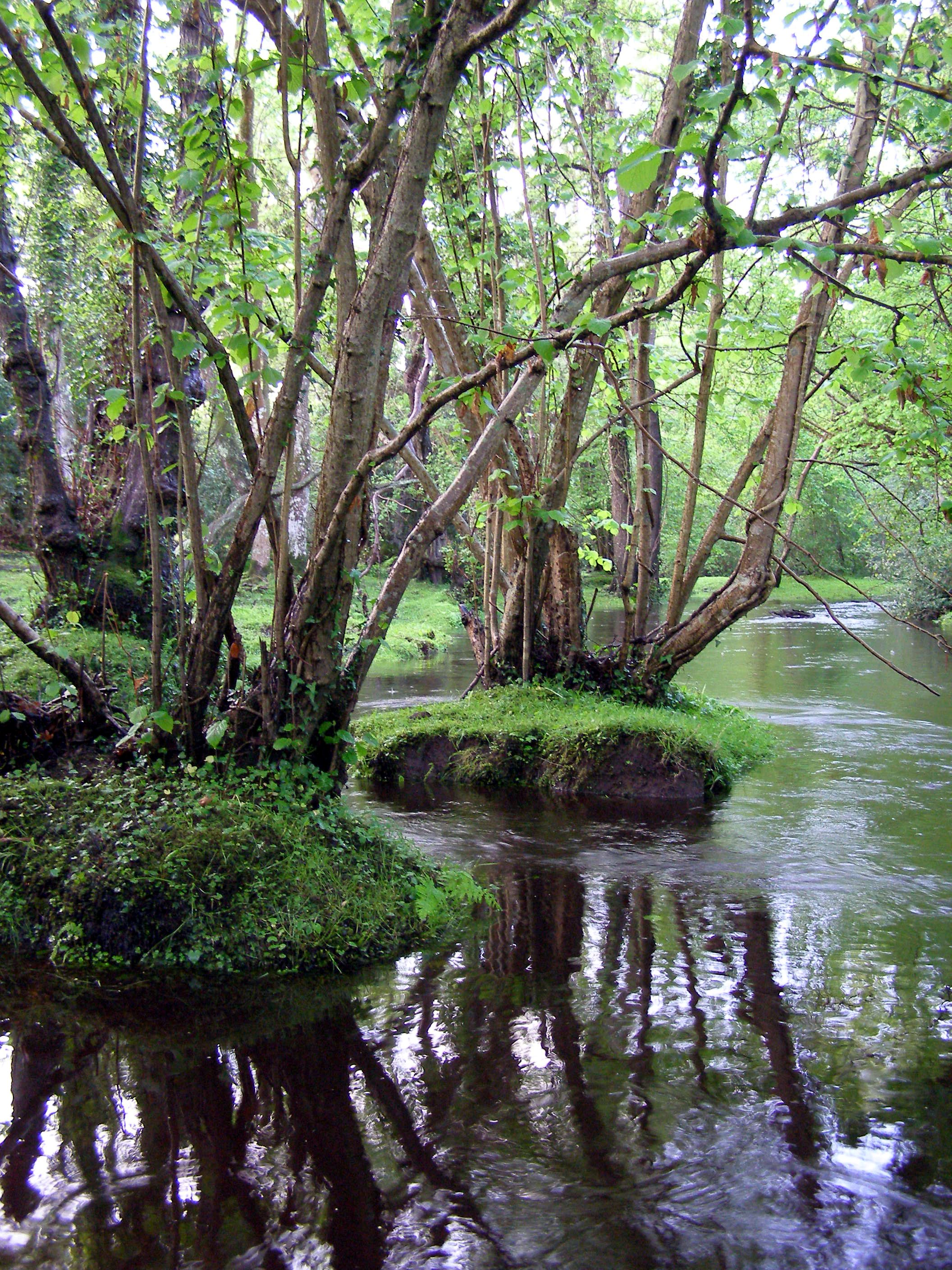
Alder trees in the Beailieu River, north of Fawley Ford

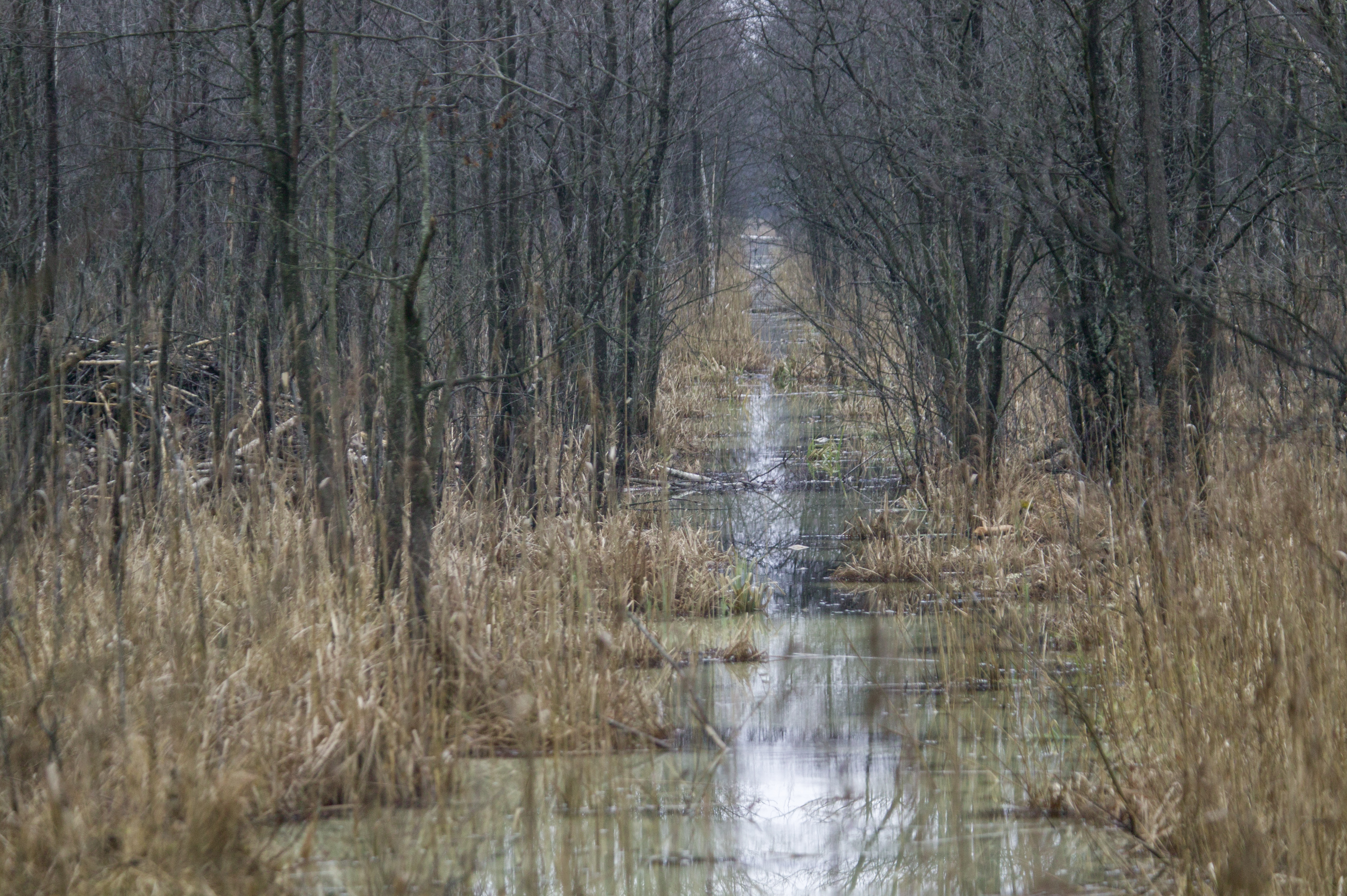
Biebrza National Park

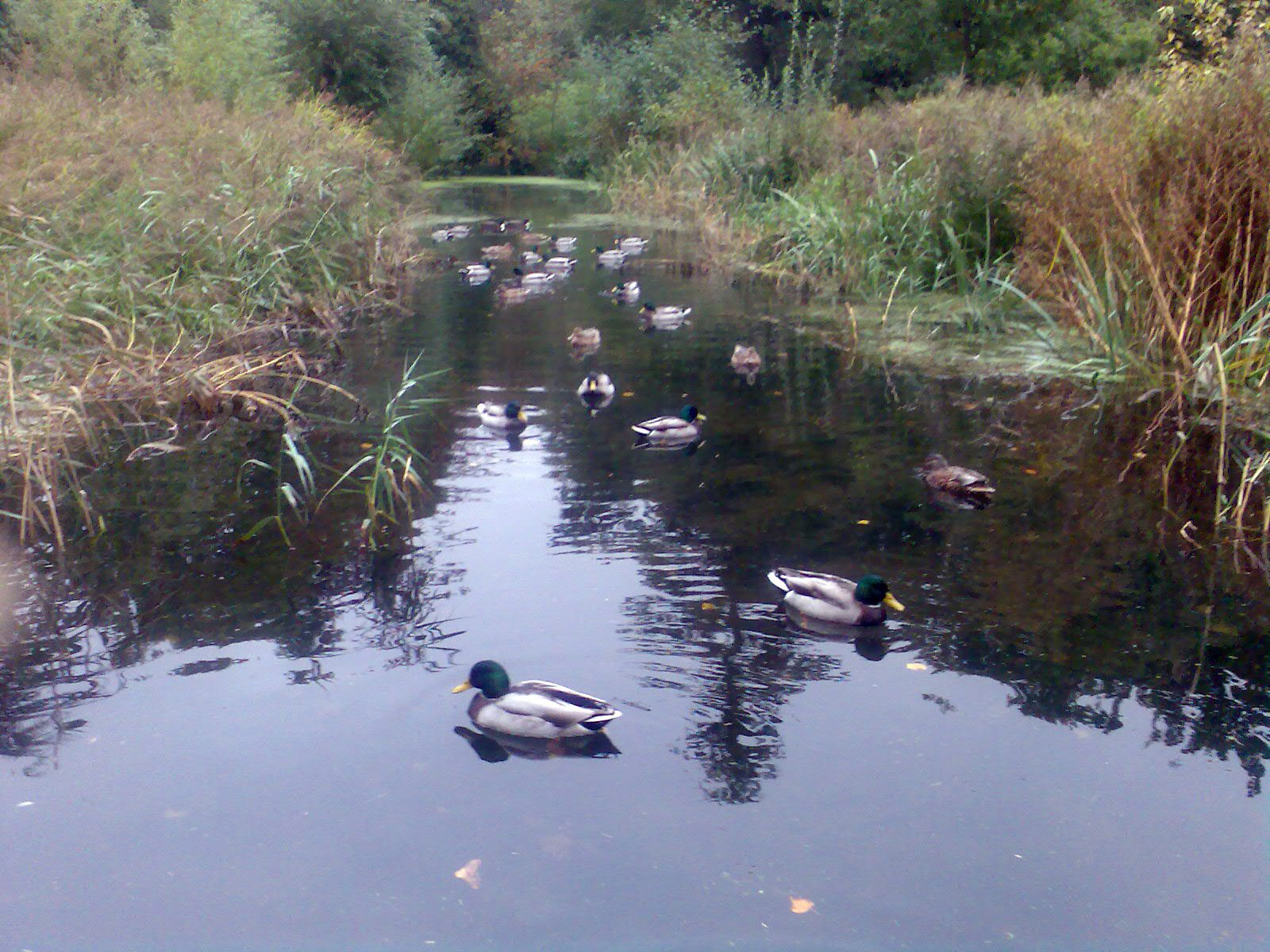
Ducks on Alder Carr, in Holywells Park
