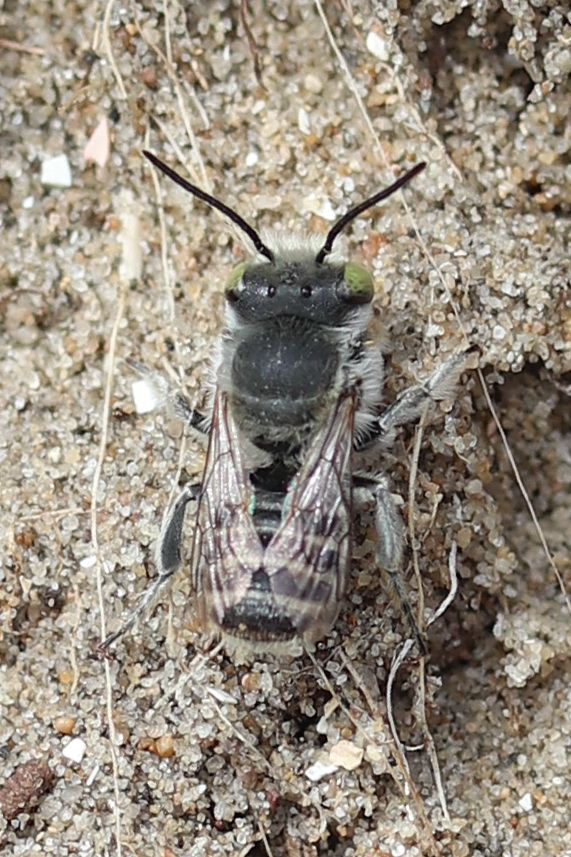

Scientific classification
- Domain: Eukaryota
- Kingdom: Animalia
- Phylum: Arthropoda
- Class: Insecta
- Order: Hymenoptera
- Family: Megachilidae
- Genus: Megachile
- Species: M. leachella

Binomial name
- Megachile leachella Curtis, 1828

Synonyms
- Apis argentata FABRICIUS 1793; Apis albiventris PANZER 1798; Megachile saussurei RADOSZKOWSKI 1874; Megachile argentata fossoria FERTON 1909; Perezia maura FERTON 1914; Megachile leachella maadiensis VAN DER ZANDEN 1986; Apis argentata auctt; Megachile dorsalis PEREZ 1879

= Megachile leachella =

Species of leafcutter bee (Megachile)

Megachile leachella, also known as the silvery leafcutter bee, is a species of solitary bee in the family Megachilidae. This species is widely distributed in the Western Palaearctic region from Southern Fennoscandia to North Africa and the Middle East, however the precise boundaries of the species range is not fully understood. The species was described by John Curtis in 1828.

== Description ==
Megachile leachella is a small species of Megachile bee, which possesses green eyes when alive. M. leachella's sixth tergite is covered in adpressed white hairs. Females of the species also possess white scopal hairs on their hind legs.

== Habitat ==
Megachile leachella is mainly found living in coastal habitat such as sand dunes, but is sometimes also found living on shingle beach where sandy patches are present. Very rarely populations can be found living further inland, however only on sandy soils. Megachile leachella is an underground nesting species, which uses leaf and petal cuttings of various plant species when building of their nests.

== Ecology ==
Megachile leachella is known to feed from the flowers of Lotus corniculatus, L. pedunculatus, Eryngium maritimum, jasione montana and Sedum anglicum.The red-legged sharp-tail bee (Coelioxys brevis) is also a parasite of M. leachella.
