= Hythe to Calshot Marshes =

Protected area in Hampshire, England

Coordinates: 50.845°N 1.354°W

- Site of Special Scientific Interest
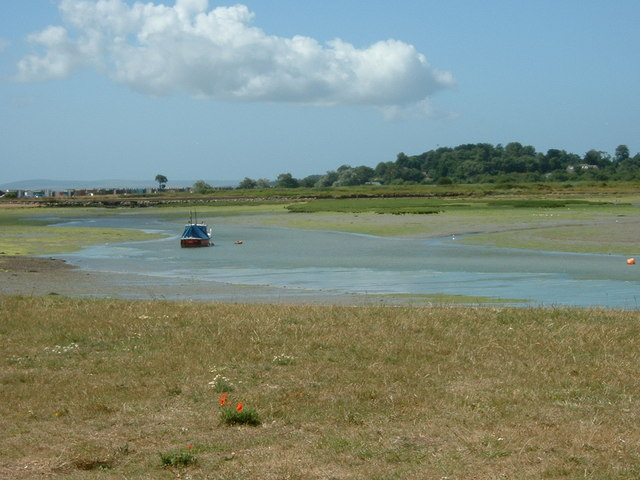
- Calshot Marshes
- Location of Hythe to Calshot Marshes.
- Area of search: Hampshire
- Grid reference: SU 456 052
- Interest: Biological
- Area: 591.8 hectares (1,462 acres)
- Notification date: 1984
- Location map: Magic Map

Hythe to Calshot Marshes is a 591.8-hectare (1,462-acre) biological Site of Special Scientific Interest which stretches along the west bank of Southampton Water between Calshot and Marchwood in Hampshire. It is part of Solent and Southampton Water Ramsar site and Special Protection Area, and of Solent Maritime Special Area of Conservation. Calshot Marshes is a Local Nature Reserve and Hythe Spartina Marsh is a nature reserve managed by the Hampshire and Isle of Wight Wildlife Trust.

These areas of saltmarsh and mudflats have nationally important numbers of wintering waders and wildfowl, such as black-tailed godwit, grey plover and dunlin. The site is internationally important for dark-bellied brent geese as it has over 1% of the world population. The benthic zone has a dense concentration of invertebrates which provide the birds' main food.
