= Lincegrove and Hackett's Marshes =

Protected area in Hampshire, England

Coordinates: 50.876°N 1.309°W

- Site of Special Scientific Interest
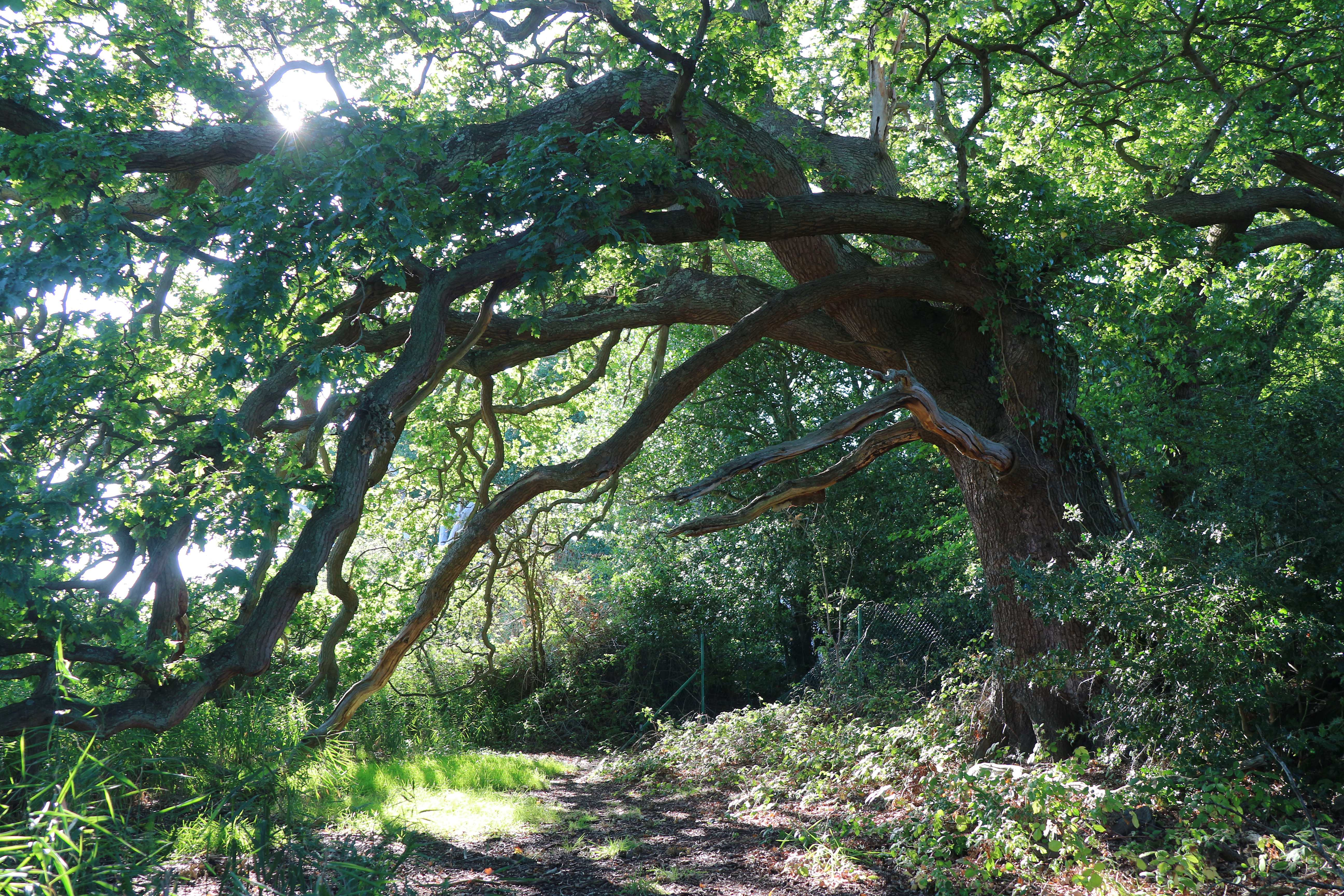
- Location of Lincegrove and Hackett's Marshes.
- Area of search: Hampshire
- Grid reference: SU 487 087
- Interest: Biological
- Area: 37.8 hectares (93 acres)
- Notification date: 1984
- Location map: Magic Map

Lincegrove and Hackett's Marshes is a 37.8-hectare (93-acre) biological Site of Special Scientific Interest on the west bank of the River Hamble between Southampton and Fareham in Hampshire. It is part of Solent and Southampton Water Ramsar site and Special Protection Area, and of Solent Maritime Special Area of Conservation. Hackett's Marsh is a 20.4 hectares (50 acres) Local Nature Reserve.

This site is one of the best examples of saltmarshes on the south coast. It is dominated by sea purslane and common cordgrass, with other flora including sea lavender, thrift, sea aster and sea clubrush.
