= Hook with Warsash =

Nature reserve in Hampshire, England

Coordinates: 50.843°N 1.300°W

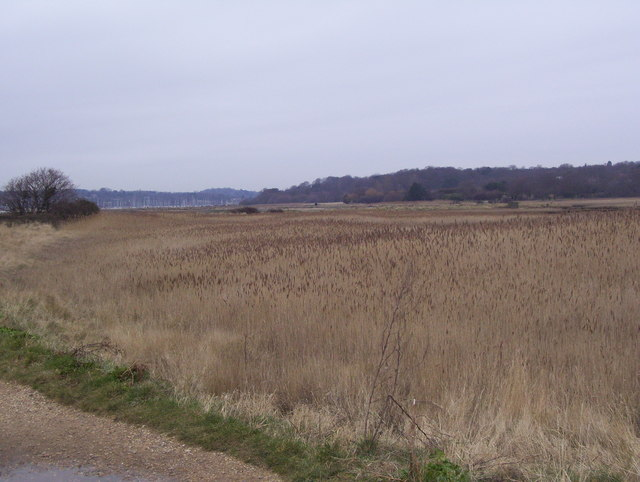
- Interactive map of Hook with Warsash
- Type: Local Nature Reserve
- Location: Fareham, Hampshire
- OS grid: SU 494 051
- Area: 251.6 hectares (622 acres)
- Manager: Hampshire Countryside Service

Hook with Warsash is a 251.6-hectare (622-acre) Local Nature Reserve west of Fareham in Hampshire. It is owned by Hampshire County Council and managed by Hampshire Countryside Service. It is part of Solent and Southampton Water Ramsar site and Special Protection Area, of Solent Maritime Special Area of Conservation, and of Lee-on-The Solent to Itchen Estuary Site of Special Scientific Interest.

This nature reserve on the banks of the River Hamble and Southampton Water has diverse habitats, intertidal mud, saltmarsh, grazing marsh, reedbed, scrapes, shingle and woodland. Flora include sea kale, yellow horned poppy, slender hare's ear, marsh marigold, English stonecrop and wild carrot.
