= Alder Carr, Hildersham =

Biological Site of Special Scientific Interest in Hildersham in Cambridgeshire

Coordinates: 52.117°N 0.251°E

Alder Carr
- Site of Special Scientific Interest
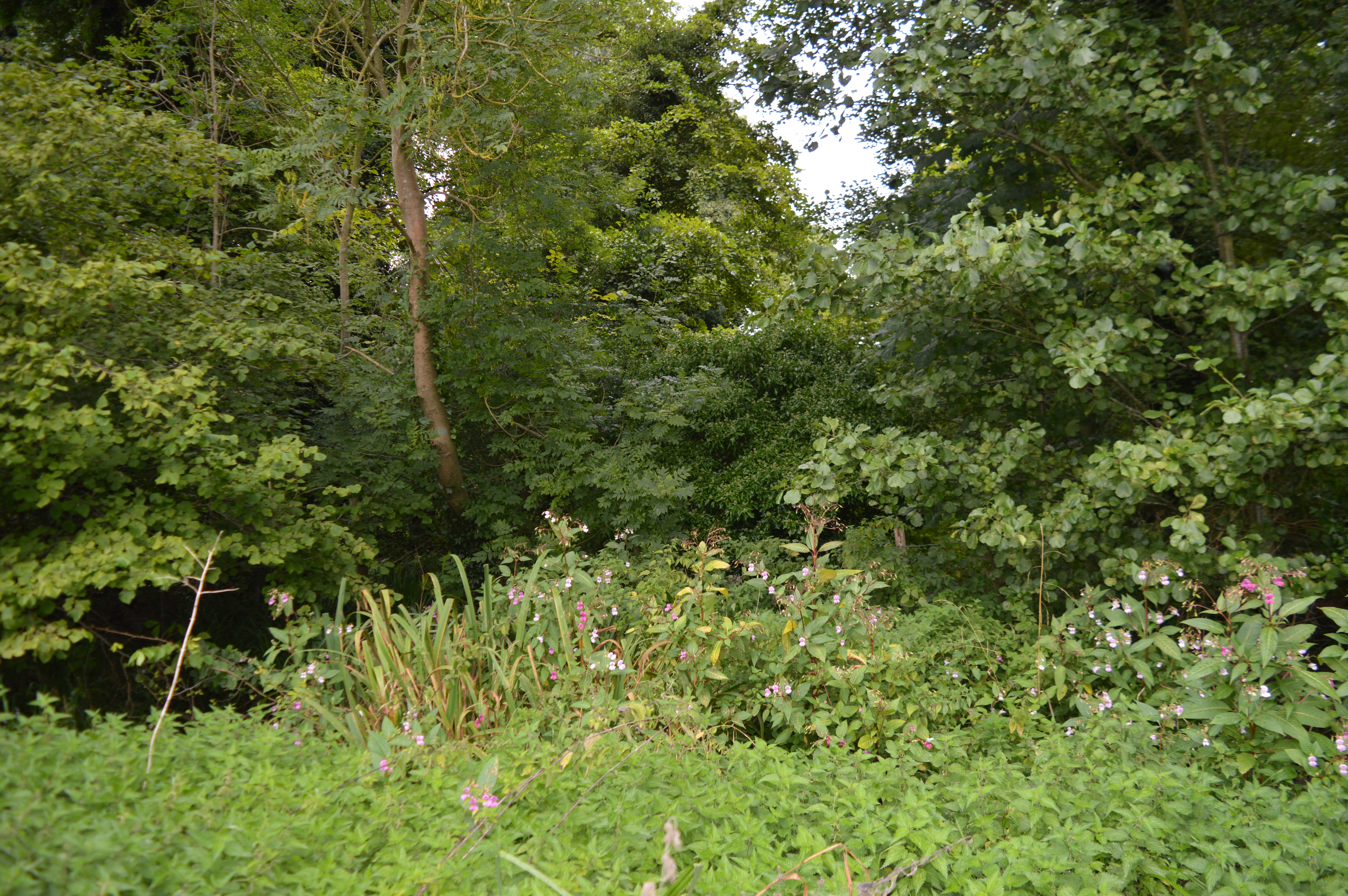
- Location of Alder Carr.
- Area of search: Cambridgeshire
- Grid reference: TL 542 489
- Interest: Biological
- Area: 6.7 hectares
- Notification date: 1985
- Location map: Magic Map

Alder Carr is a 6.7-hectare biological Site of Special Scientific Interest in Hildersham in Cambridgeshire.

The site is a wet valley which has alder on fen peat, a type of woodland, known as carr, which is now rare in East Anglia. Ground flora include angelica and meadowsweet. This habitat is very valuable to invertebrates.

The site is private land with no public access.
