= Liss Riverside Railway Walk South =

Nature reserve in Liss, Hampshire, England

Coordinates: 51.045°N 0.893°W

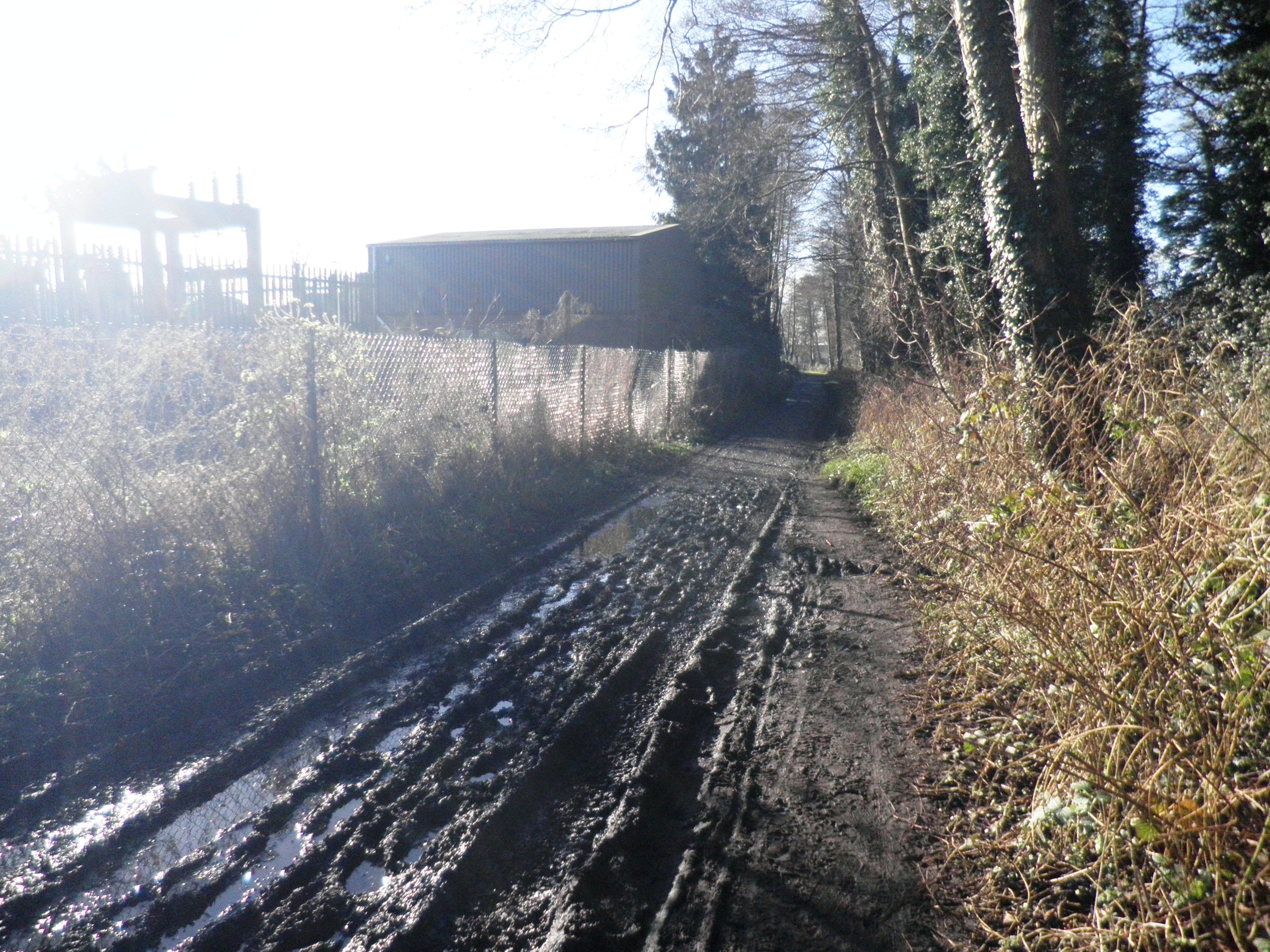
- Interactive map of Liss Riverside Railway Walk South
- Type: Local Nature Reserve
- Location: Liss, Hampshire
- OS grid: SU 777 279
- Area: 1.6 hectares (4.0 acres)
- Manager: Liss Parish Council

Liss Riverside Railway Walk South is a 1.6-hectare (4.0-acre) Local Nature Reserve in Liss in Hampshire. It is owned and managed by Liss Parish Council.

This footpath through woodland is the southern continuation of Liss Riverside Railway Walk North, following the route of the former Longmoor Military Railway.
