= Lee-on-The Solent to Itchen Estuary =

Protected area in Hampshire, England

Coordinates: 50.851°N 1.310°W

- Site of Special Scientific Interest
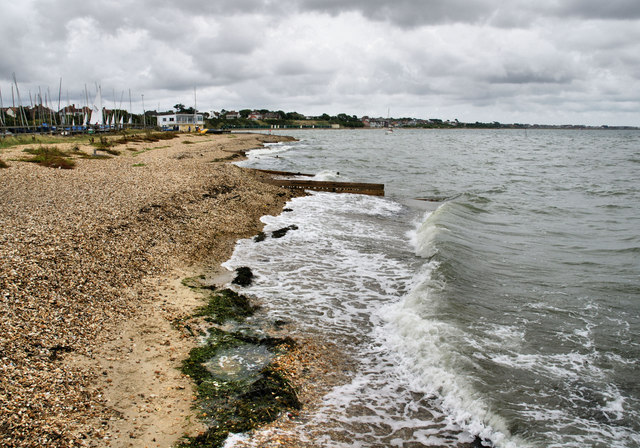
- The beach at Titchfield Haven
- Location of Lee-on-The Solent to Itchen Estuary.
- Area of search: Hampshire
- Grid reference: SU 487 059
- Interest: Biological; Geological
- Area: 585.9 hectares (1,448 acres)
- Notification date: 1992
- Location map: Magic Map

Lee-on-The Solent to Itchen Estuary is a 585.9-hectare (1,448-acre) biological and geological Site of Special Scientific Interest which stretches along the coast between Southampton and Gosport in Hampshire. It is a Geological Conservation Review site. It is part of Solent and Southampton Water Ramsar site and Special Protection Area, and of Solent Maritime Special Area of Conservation. Three areas are Local Nature Reserves, Chessel Bay, Hook with Warsash and Mercury Marshes. One area is Hamble Common, a Scheduled Monument and public common.

This site is mainly intertidal muds, and there are also areas of saltmarsh, vegetated shingle, reedbeds, deciduous woodland and marshy grassland. It is outstanding for nationally scarce coastal plants, internationally important for dark-bellied geese, and nationally important for eight other species of birds, including great crested grebe and ringed plover. The site is also important for Palaeolithic artefacts and the fossils of Eocene birds.
