= Alderfen Broad =

Lake in the United Kingdom

Coordinates: 52.72°N 1.484°E

- Site of Special Scientific Interest
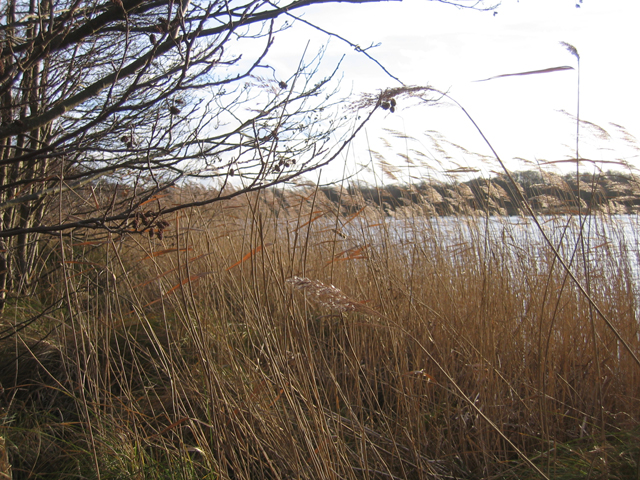

- Location within England
- Location of Alderfen Broad.
- Area of search: Norfolk, England
- Grid reference: TG 354 195
- Interest: Biological
- Area: 21.3 hectares (53 acres)
- Notification date: 1984
- Location map: Magic Map

Alderfen Broad is a 21.3-hectare (53-acre) biological Site of Special Scientific Interest north-east of Norwich in Norfolk, England. It is managed by the Norfolk Wildlife Trust. It is part of the Broadland Ramsar site and Special Protection Area and The Broads Special Area of Conservation.

This area of fenland peat has open water, alder carr woodland and reedswamp. Breeding birds include the great crested grebe, water rail, grasshopper warbler and reed warbler.

The site is open to the public.
