= Fen Alder Carr =

Nature reserve in Suffolk, England

Coordinates: 52.168°N 1.053°E

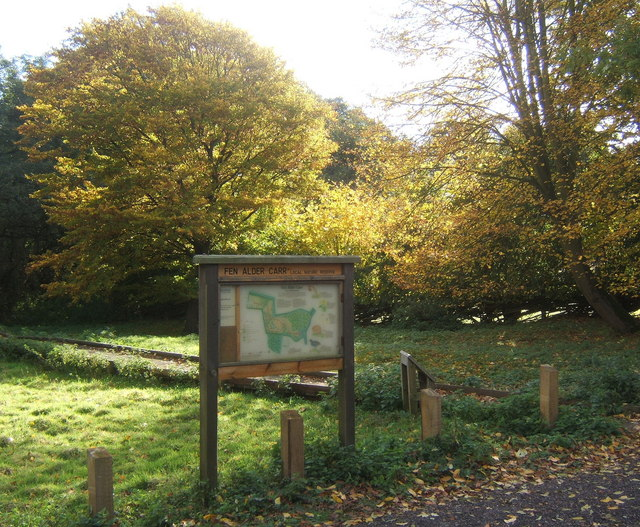
- Interactive map of Fen Alder Carr
- Type: Local Nature Reserve
- Location: Creeting St Peter, Suffolk
- OS grid: TM 089 566
- Area: 1.7 hectares (4.2 acres)

Fen Alder Carr is a 1.7 hectare Local Nature Reserve south-east of Creeting St Peter in Suffolk, England, owned by Suffolk County Council.

This site has diverse habitats, including open water, alder carr woodland and tall fen. There is a large rookery high in the trees, and there are other birds such as siskins, chaffinches and redpolls.

There is access from Fen Lane.
