= Hazleton Common, Horndean =

Local nature reserve in Hampshire, England

Coordinates: 50.902°N 1.001°W

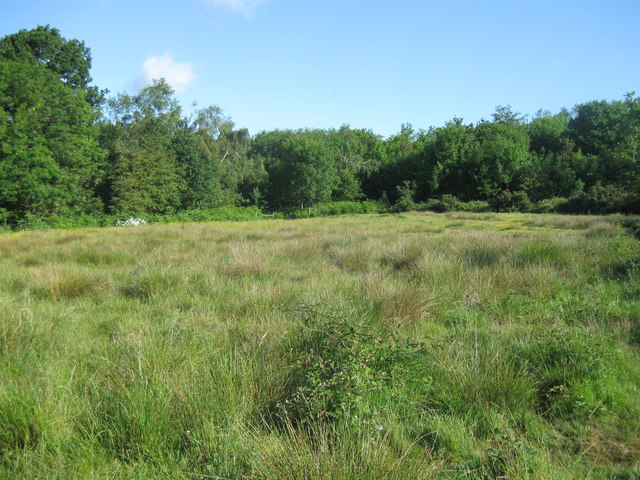
- Interactive map of Hazleton Common, Horndean
- Type: Local Nature Reserve
- Location: Horndean, Hampshire
- OS grid: SU 703 119
- Area: 17.5 hectares (43 acres)
- Manager: Horndean Parish Council

Hazleton Common, Horndean is a 17.5-hectare (43-acre) Local Nature Reserve in Horndean in Hampshire. It is owned and managed by Horndean Parish Council.

The common is mainly lowland heath, together with ponds and areas of woodland. Fauna include common lizards, adders, grass snake, slow worms, broad-bodied chaser dragonflies, green woodpeckers and partridges.
