= Valley Park Woodlands =

Nature reserve in Hampshire, England

Coordinates: 50.981°N 1.406°W

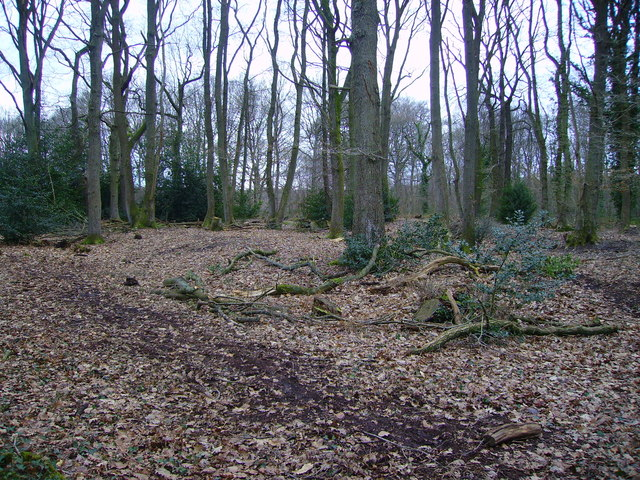
- Interactive map of Valley Park Woodlands
- Type: Local Nature Reserve
- Location: Chandler's Ford, Hampshire
- OS grid: SU 418 204
- Area: 24.8 hectares (61 acres)
- Manager: Test Valley Borough Council

Valley Park Woodlands is a 24.8-hectare (61-acre) Local Nature Reserve in Chandler's Ford in Hampshire. It is owned and managed by Test Valley Borough Council.

This site has ancient woods, coppice, glades, woodland rides, rough grassland and ponds.
