= Netley Common =

Nature reserve in Hampshire, England

Coordinates: 50.903°N 1.324°W

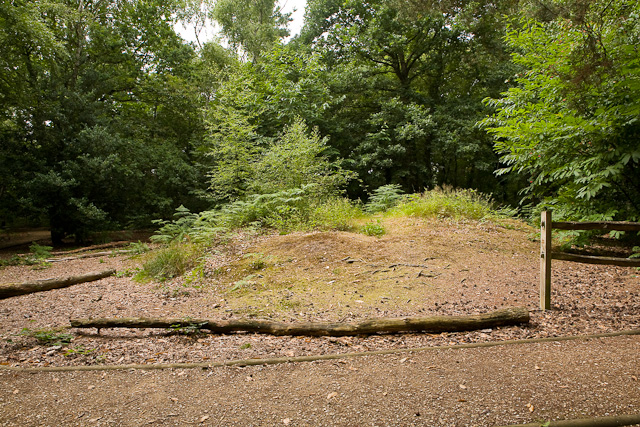
- Interactive map of Netley Common
- Type: Local Nature Reserve
- Location: Southampton, Hampshire
- OS grid: SU 476 117
- Area: 12.8 hectares (32 acres)
- Manager: Hampshire Countryside Service

Netley Common is a 12.8-hectare (32-acre) Local Nature Reserve in Southampton in Hampshire. It is owned by Hampshire County Council and managed by Hampshire Countryside Service.

This lowland heath site also has areas of grassland, woods, scrub and gorse. Reptiles include common lizards and adders. A Roman road crosses the site, and there is also a Bronze Age barrow.
