= Milford on Sea LNR =

Nature reserve in Hampshire, England

Coordinates: 50.728°N 1.606°W

Milford on Sea
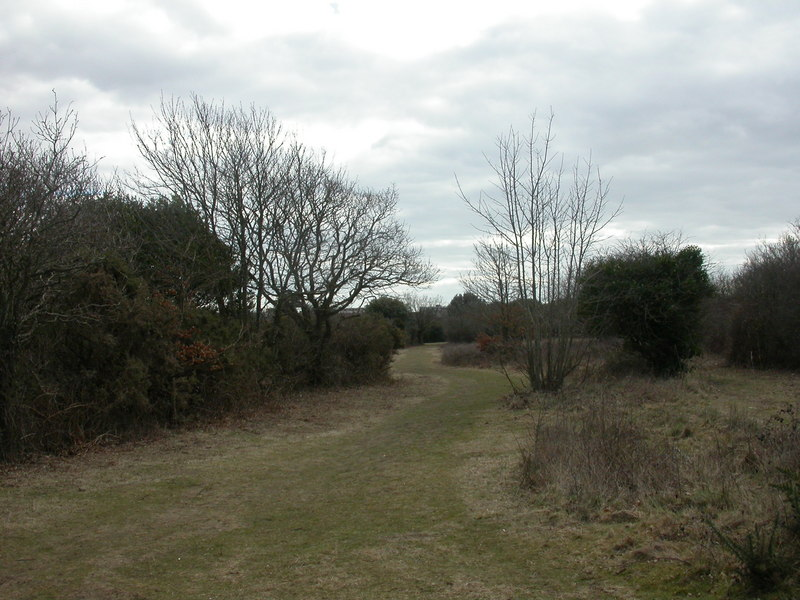
- Interactive map of Milford on Sea
- Type: Local Nature Reserve
- Location: Milford on Sea, Hampshire
- OS grid: SZ 279 921
- Area: 20.6 hectares (51 acres)
- Manager: Milford On Sea Parish Council

Milford on Sea LNR is a 20.6-hectare (51-acre) local nature reserve in Milford on Sea in Hampshire. It is owned and managed by Milford on Sea Parish Council.

The Danes Stream runs through this nature reserve, which has ancient woodland, grassland and winding paths.
