= Bishops Waltham Branch LNR =

Nature reserve in Hampshire, England

Coordinates: 50.950°N 1.223°W

Bishops Waltham Branch
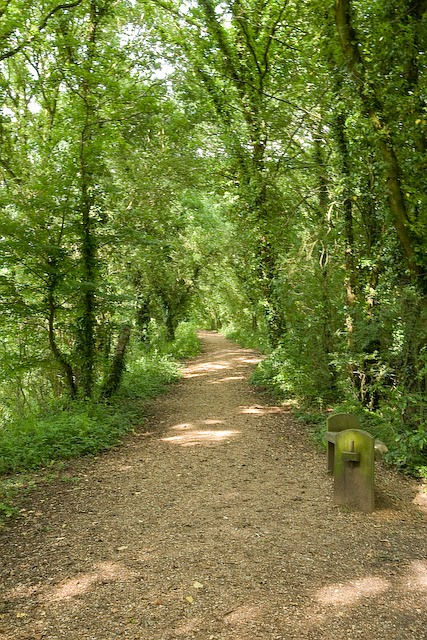
- Interactive map of Bishops Waltham Branch
- Type: Local Nature Reserve
- Location: Bishop's Waltham, Hampshire
- OS grid: SU 547 170
- Area: 1.6 hectares (4.0 acres)
- Manager: Hampshire County Council

Bishops Waltham Branch LNR is a 1.6-hectare (4.0-acre) local nature reserve in Bishop's Waltham in Hampshire. It is owned and managed by Hampshire County Council.

This site is a 1 kilometre (0.62 miles) footpath along the former railway line from Bishop's Waltham to Botley. The path is lined by trees such as oaks and field maples, and flowering plants including wood avens and herb robert.

The King's Way and Pilgrims' Trail pass through the site.
