= Calshot Marshes =

Nature reserve in Hampshire, England

Coordinates: 50.818°N 1.316°W

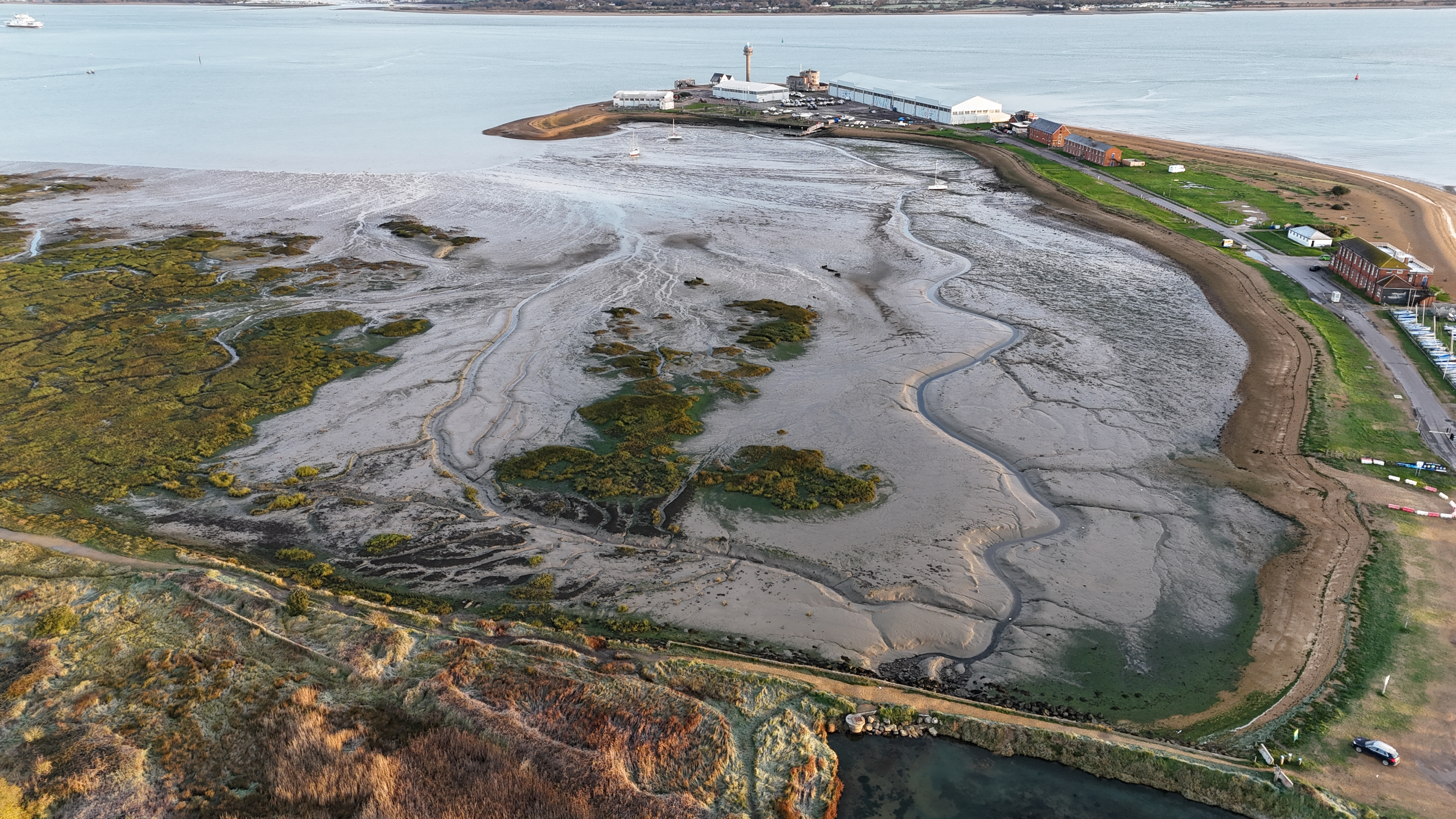
- Interactive map of Calshot Marshes
- Type: Local Nature Reserve
- Location: Calshot, Hampshire
- OS grid: SU 483 023
- Area: 51.1 hectares (126 acres)
- Manager: Hampshire Countryside Service

Calshot Marshes is a 51.1-hectare (126-acre) Local Nature Reserve near Calshot, at the junction of The Solent and Southampton Water in Hampshire. It is owned by Hampshire County Council and managed by Hampshire Countryside Service. It is part of Solent and Southampton Water Ramsar site and Special Protection Area, of Solent Maritime Special Area of Conservation and of Hythe to Calshot Marshes Site of Special Scientific Interest.

This saltmarsh site is internationally important for dark-bellied brent geese and nationally important for wigeon, teal, ringed plover, grey plover, black-tailed godwit, redshank and dunlin.
