= The Moors, Bishop's Waltham =

Nature reserve in Hampshire, England

Coordinates: 50.949°N 1.203°W

- Site of Special Scientific Interest
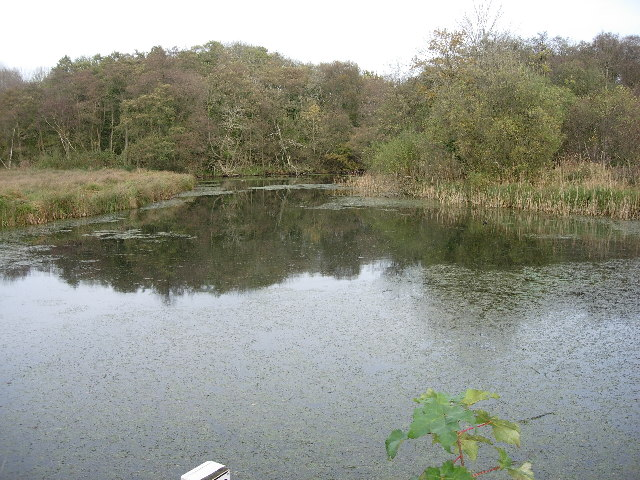
- Mill Pond
- Location of The Moors, Bishop's Waltham.
- Area of search: Hampshire
- Grid reference: SU 561 169
- Interest: Biological
- Area: 28.0 hectares (69 acres)
- Notification date: 1984
- Location map: Magic Map

The Moors, Bishop's Waltham is a 28-hectare (69-acre) biological Site of Special Scientific Interest in Bishop's Waltham in Hampshire. It is a Nature Conservation Review and an area of 14.5 hectares (36 acres) is a Local Nature Reserve, which is owned and managed by Hampshire County Council.

These unimproved wet meadows and alder carr drain into Mill Pond at the centre of the site. The meadows have a rich and diverse flora, dominated by greater pond sedge in wetter areas, while there are plants such as purple moor-grass and meadow foxtail in drier parts.
