= Gutner Point =

Nature reserve in Hampshire, England

Coordinates: 50.809°N 0.954°W

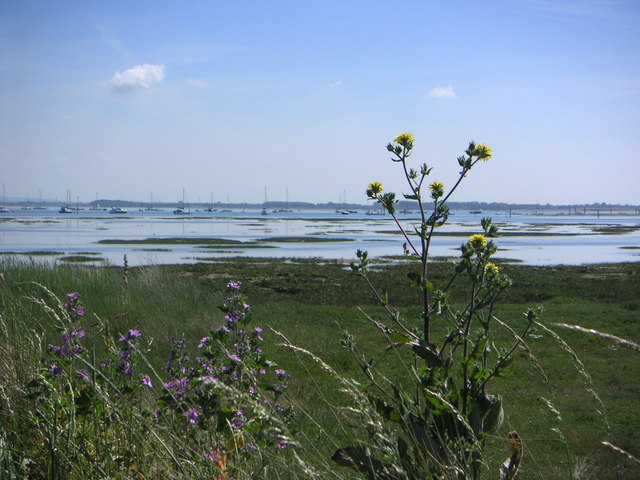
- Interactive map of Gutner Point
- Type: Local Nature Reserve
- Location: Hayling Island, Hampshire
- OS grid: SU 738 016
- Area: 69 hectares (170 acres)
- Manager: Hampshire Countryside Service

Gutner Point is a 69-hectare (170-acre) Local Nature Reserve on Hayling Island in Hampshire, England. It is owned by Hampshire County Council and managed by Hampshire Countryside Service. It is part of Chichester and Langstone Harbours Ramsar site and Special Protection Area, of Solent Maritime Special Area of Conservation, and of Chichester Harbour Site of Special Scientific Interest.

This site in Chichester Harbour has inter-tidal muds, grassland and saltmarsh. Flora includes sea-lavender. Many birds feed on invertebrates in the mud at low tide and rest on foreshore at high tide.

There is no public access to the site.
