= Holly Hill Woodland Park =

Nature reserve in Hampshire, England

Coordinates: 50.866°N 1.297°W

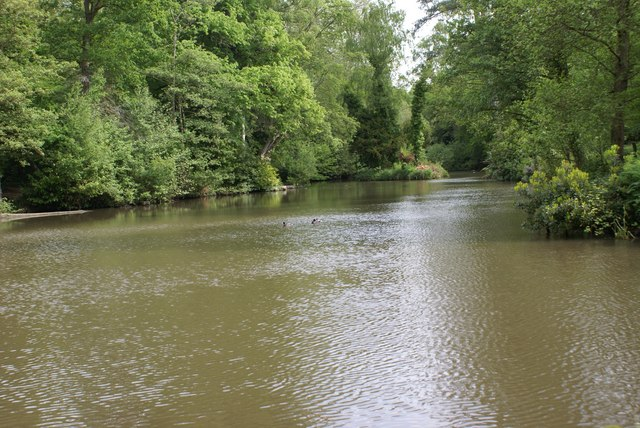
- Interactive map of Holly Hill Woodland Park
- Type: Local Nature Reserve
- Location: Fareham, Hampshire
- OS grid: SU 496 076
- Area: 28.1 hectares (69 acres)
- Manager: Countryside Ranger Service

Holly Hill Woodland Park is a 28.1-hectare (69-acre) Local Nature Reserve in Fareham in Hampshire. It is owned by Fareham Borough Council and managed by the Countryside Ranger Service.

The park has landscaped areas with lakes, waterfalls, islands and woods with exotic trees and flowers, as well as native trees such as oaks. There is also a less formal area of ancient semi-natural woodland.
