= Mercury Marshes =

Nature reserve in Hampshire, England

Coordinates: 50.866°N 1.311°W

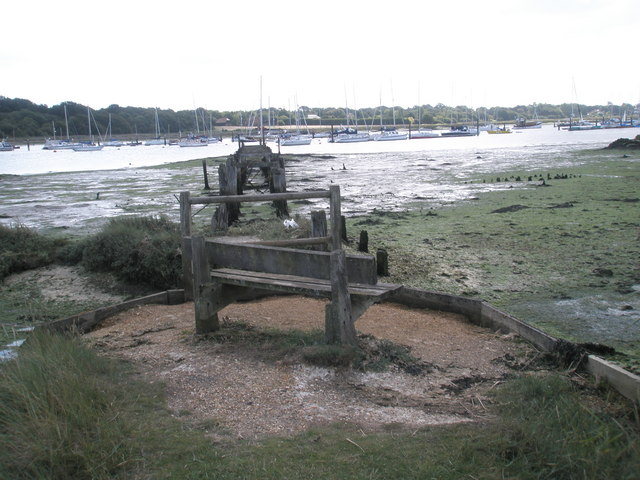
- Interactive map of Mercury Marshes
- Type: Local Nature Reserve
- Location: Hamble-le-Rice, Hampshire
- OS grid: SU 486 076
- Area: 6.4 hectares (16 acres)
- Manager: Hampshire Countryside Service

Mercury Marshes is a 6.4-hectare (16-acre) Local Nature Reserve in Hamble-le-Rice in Hampshire. It is owned by Hampshire County Council and managed by Hampshire Countryside Service. It is part of Solent and Southampton Water Ramsar site and Special Protection Area, of Solent Maritime Special Area of Conservation, and of Lee-on-The Solent to Itchen Estuary, which is a Site of Special Scientific Interest.

This site on the west bank of the River Hamble has intertidal mud, reedbeds, islands, saltmarsh, creeks and woodland. The saltmarsh and islands are dominated by sea purslane, cordgrass, sea aster and glasswort. The reserve is important for invertebrates and waders.
