= Brook Meadow (Emsworth) =

Nature reserve in Hampshire, England

Coordinates: 50.849°N 0.936°W

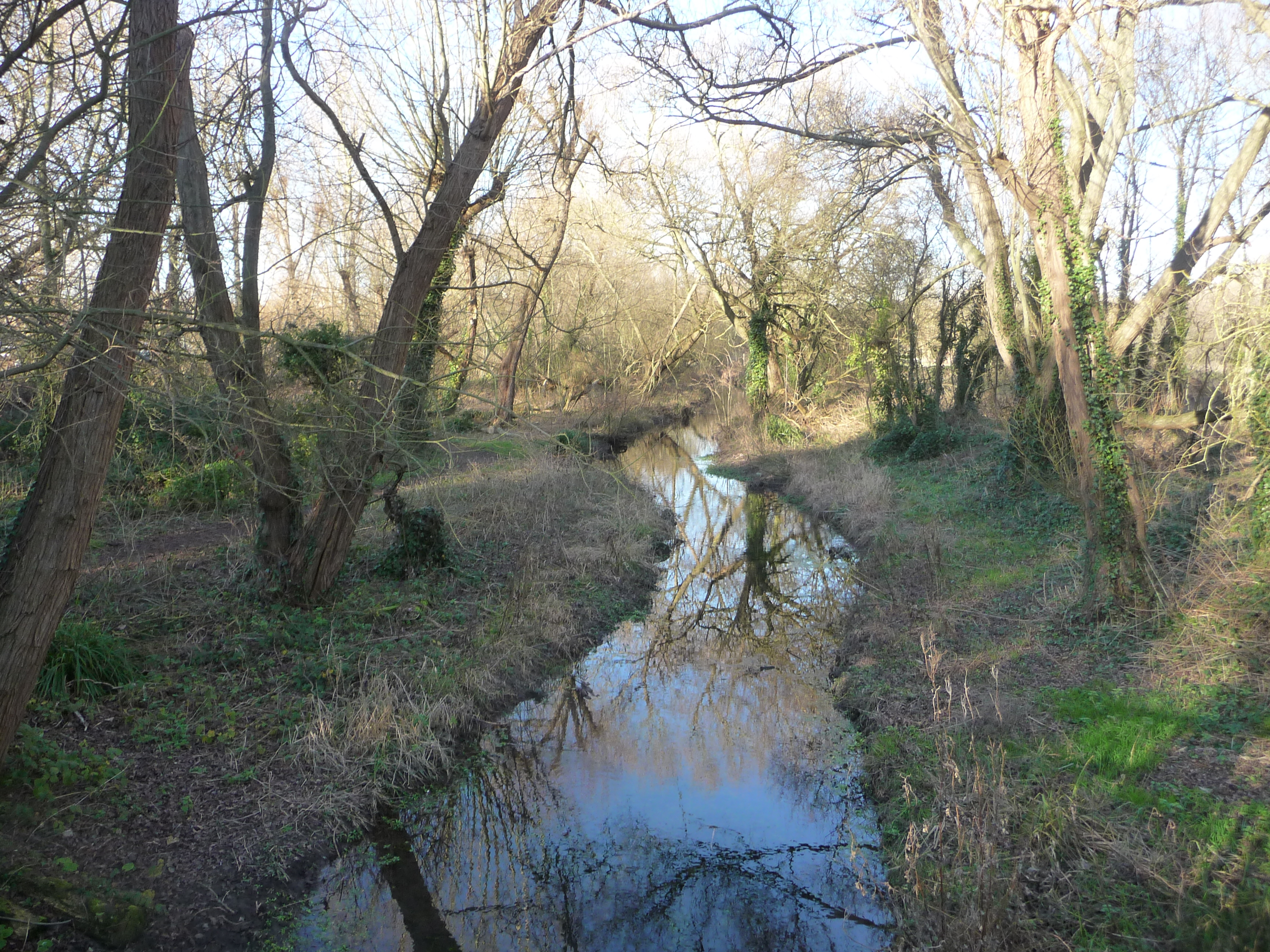
- Interactive map of Brook Meadow (Emsworth)
- Type: Local Nature Reserve
- Location: Emsworth, Hampshire
- OS grid: SU 750 060
- Area: 3.9 hectares (9.6 acres)
- Manager: Brook Meadow Conservation Group

Brook Meadow (Emsworth) is a 3.9-hectare (9.6-acre) Local Nature Reserve in Emsworth in Hampshire. It is owned by Havant Borough Council and managed by Brook Meadow Conservation Group.

Most of this site is grassland, which is surrounded by woodland and flanked by two streams. The diverse wildlife includes water voles.
