= Claylands =

Nature reserve in Hampshire, United Kingdom

Coordinates: 50.959°N 1.223°W

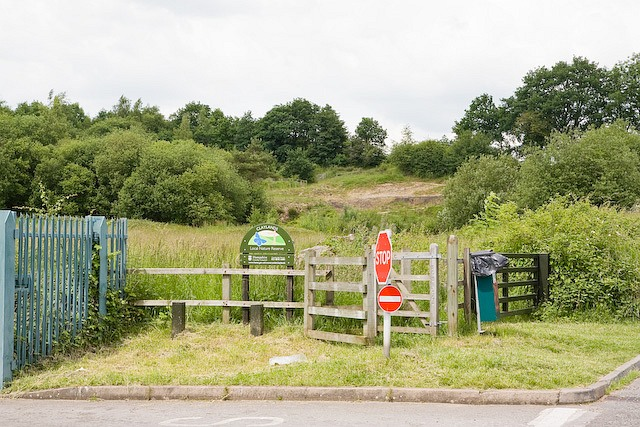
- Interactive map of Claylands
- Type: Local Nature Reserve
- Location: Bishop's Waltham, Hampshire
- OS grid: SU 547 180
- Area: 5.8 hectares (14 acres)
- Manager: Hampshire Countryside Service

Claylands is a 5.8-hectare (14-acre) Local Nature Reserve in Bishop's Waltham in Hampshire. It is owned by Hampshire County Council and managed by Hampshire Countryside Service.

This former clay working has woodland, ponds, meadows and scrub. The ponds have populations of great crested newts. There are butterflies such as marbled white, common blue and green hairstreak.
