= Hocombe Mead =

Nature reserve in Hampshire, England

Coordinates: 51.001°N 1.389°W

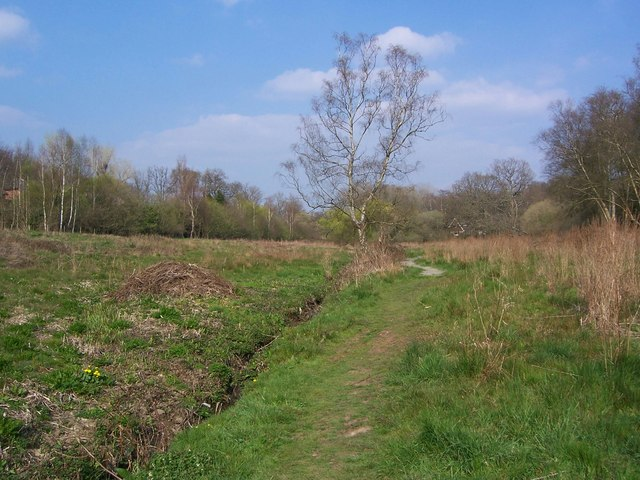
- Interactive map of Hocombe Mead
- Type: Local Nature Reserve
- Location: Eastleigh, Hampshire
- OS grid: SU 430 226
- Area: 8.3 hectares (21 acres)
- Manager: Eastleigh Borough Council

Hocombe Mead is a 8.3-hectare (21-acre) Local Nature Reserve in Eastleigh in Hampshire. It is owned by Eastleigh Borough Council and managed by Eastleigh Borough Council & Friends of Hocombe Mead.

The site has two species-rich meadows. The north one, which is grazed by cattle, has a large colony of ringlet butterflies, while the south one is maintained by cutting. There are also woods, with some parts more than 400 years old. There are small areas of bog and heath.

It is shown on maps from 1588, in which it was known as Eagle's Copse.
