= Deadwater Valley =

Protected area in Hampshire, England

Coordinates: 51.107°N 0.857°W

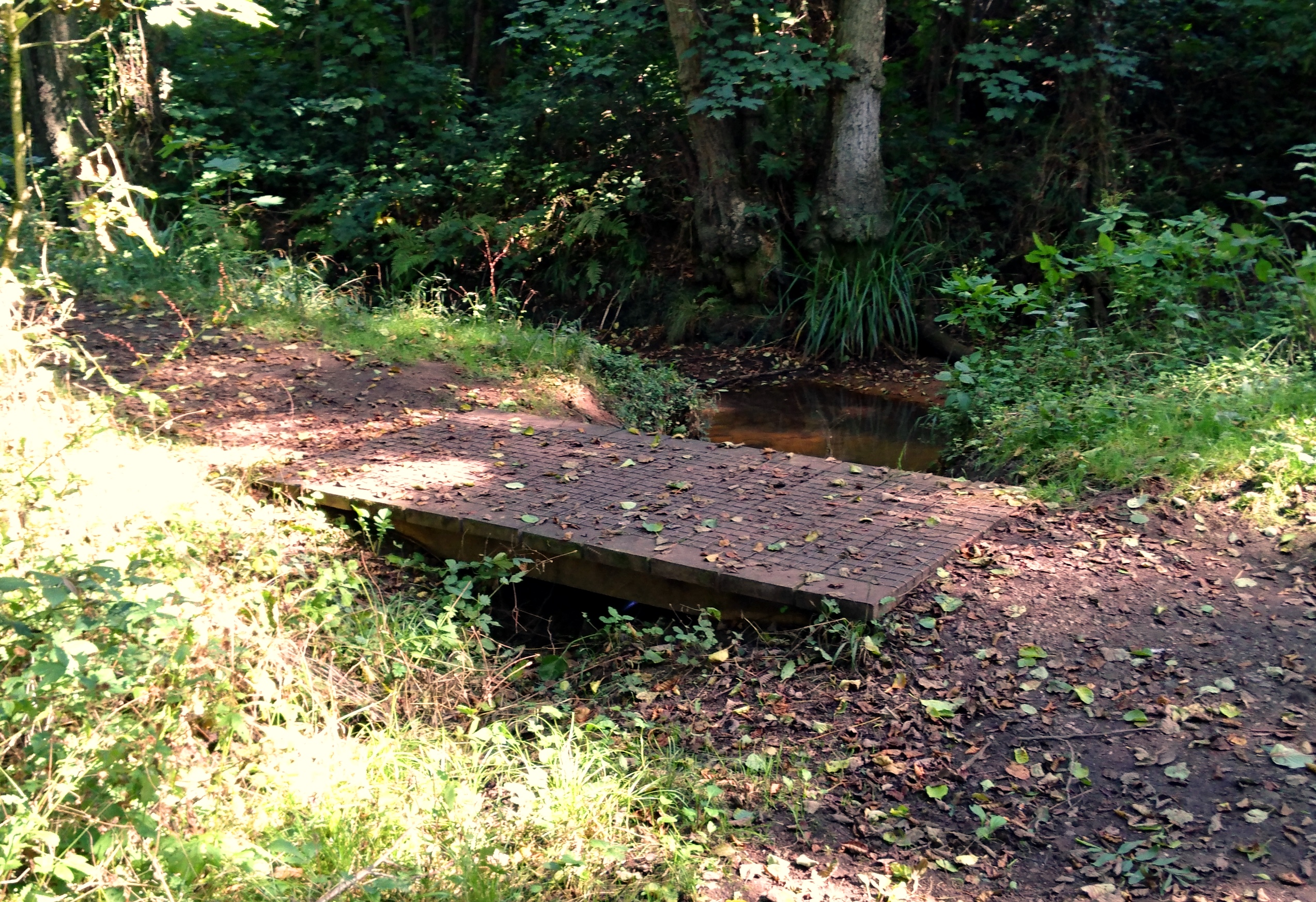
- Interactive map of Deadwater Valley
- Type: Local Nature Reserve
- Location: Bordon, Hampshire
- OS grid: SU 801 348
- Area: 35.9 hectares (89 acres)
- Manager: Deadwater Valley Trust

Deadwater Valley is a 35.9-hectare (89-acre) Local Nature Reserve in Bordon in Hampshire. It is owned by East Hampshire District Council and managed by the Deadwater Valley Trust. Part of the site is a Scheduled Monument.

This site along the west bank of the River Deadwater has a pond, a meadow, wet and dry heath, alder carr and broadleaved and coniferous woodland. There are Civil War earthworks in the south of the reserve.
