= Hackett's Marsh =

Nature reserve in Hampshire, England

Coordinates: 50.878°N 1.308°W

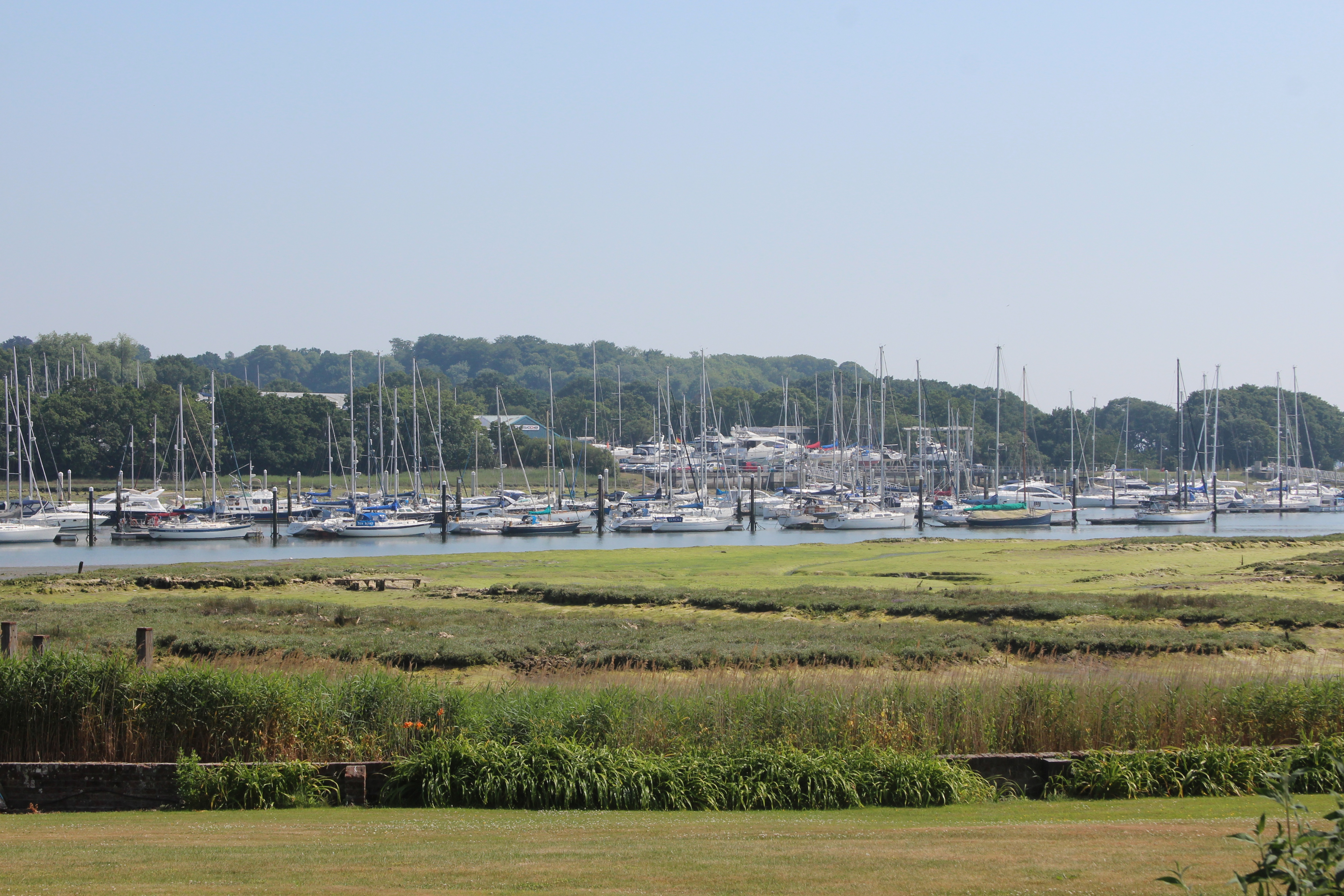
- Interactive map of Hackett's Marsh
- Type: Local Nature Reserve
- Location: Bursledon, Hampshire
- OS grid: SU 488 089
- Area: 20.4 hectares (50 acres)
- Manager: Hampshire Countryside Service

Hackett's Marsh is a 20.4-hectare (50-acre) Local Nature Reserve in Bursledon in Hampshire. It is owned by Hampshire County Council and managed by Hampshire Countryside Service. It is part of Solent and Southampton Water Ramsar site and Special Protection Area, of Solent Maritime Special Area of Conservation and of Lincegrove and Hackett's Marshes Site of Special Scientific Interest.

This site has saltmarshes and species-rich grassland. Its diverse insects, which include some species which are nationally rare, provide an important source of food for waders, such as golden plovers, black-tailed godwits and curlews.
