= Carr (landform) =

Shrub-dominated wetlands

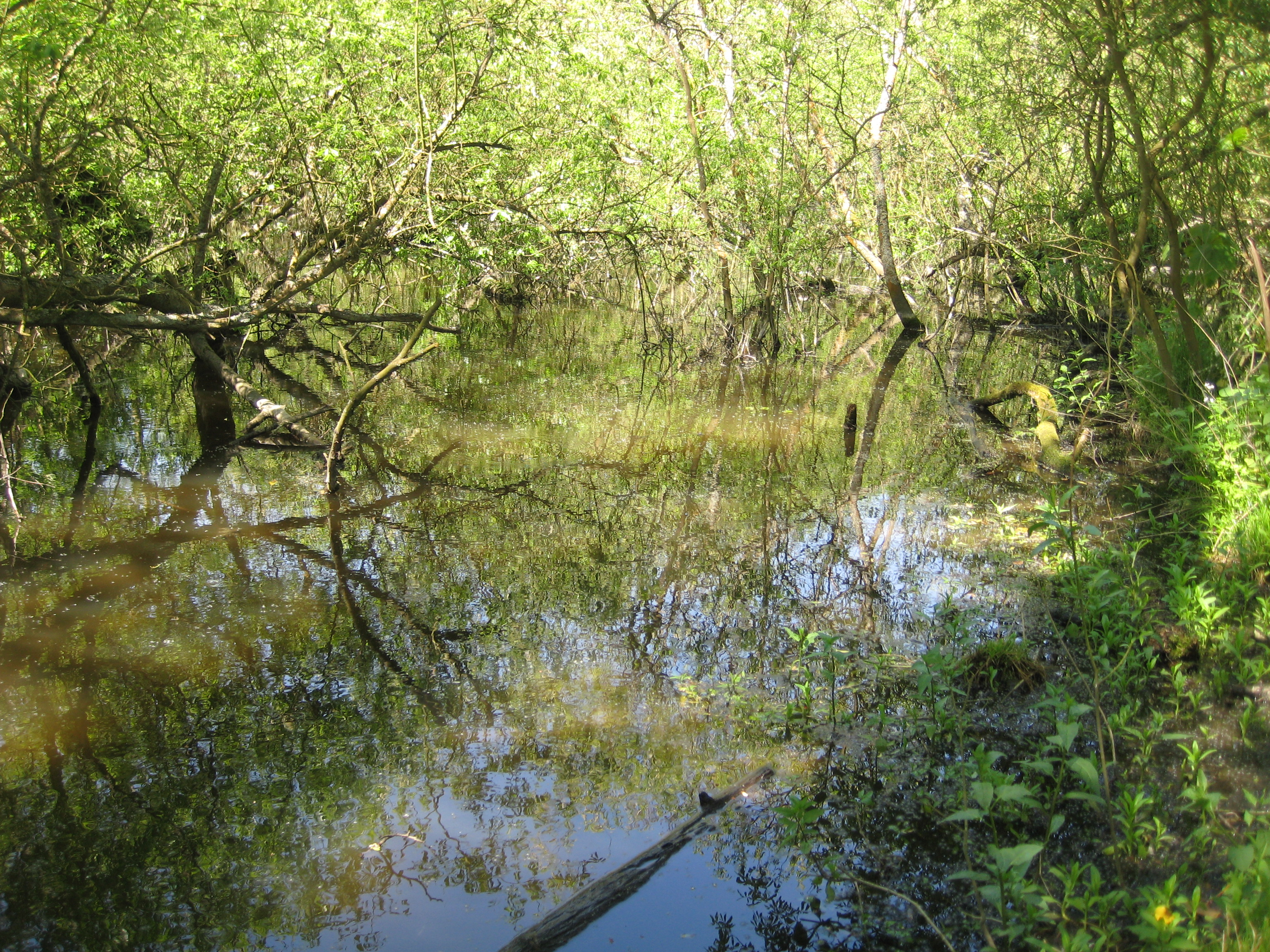
An alder carr at Moor Park, Farnham, Surrey in England, UK

A carr is a type of waterlogged wooded terrain that, typically, represents a succession stage between the original reedy marsh and the likely eventual formation of forest in a sub-maritime climate. Carrs are wetlands that are dominated by shrubs rather than trees. The carr is one stage in a hydrosere: the progression of vegetation beginning from a terrain submerged by fresh water along a river or lake margin. In sub-maritime regions, which are transitional between maritime and continental ones, it begins with reed-marsh. As the reeds decay, the soil surface eventually rises above the water, creating fens that allow vegetation such as sedge to grow. As this progression continues, riparian trees and bushes appear and a carr landscape is created – in effect a wooded fen in a waterlogged terrain. At this stage, overall, unlike the overwhelming acidity of decaying reeds, the pH is not too acidic and the soil is not too deficient in minerals, making a habitat for endemic and other wildlife. Characteristic water-tolerant trees include alder and willow.

== Etymology ==
The word carr derives from the Old Norse kjarr, meaning 'brushwood' in the word kjarr-mýrr, meaning 'marsh overgrown with brushwood'. Other descendants of kjarr include Icelandic kjarr and Norwegian kjarr or kjerr, all meaning 'brushwood'; also Danish kær and Swedish kärr both meaning 'swamp'.
