= The Mill Field, Hampshire =

Nature reserve in Hampshire, England

Coordinates: 51.276°N 1.051°W

The Mill Field
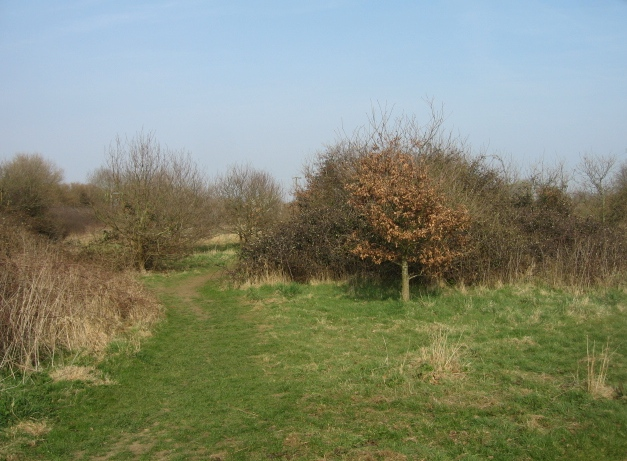
- Interactive map of The Mill Field
- Type: Local Nature Reserve
- Location: Basingstoke, Hampshire
- OS grid: SU 663 534
- Area: 11.7 hectares (29 acres)
- Manager: Mill Field Conservation Group and Basingstoke and Deane Borough Council

The Mill Field is a 11.7-hectare (29-acre) Local Nature Reserve in Basingstoke in Hampshire. It is owned by Basingstoke and Deane Borough Council and managed by the Mill Field Conservation Group and Basingstoke and Deane Borough Council.

The field has a large area of grassland together with scrub and hedgerows. There are water voles and dormice, while insects include waved black, lunar yellow underwing and water carpet moths and marbled white butterflies.
