= Westwood Woodland Park =

Nature reserve in Southampton, England

Coordinates: 50.883°N 1.356°W

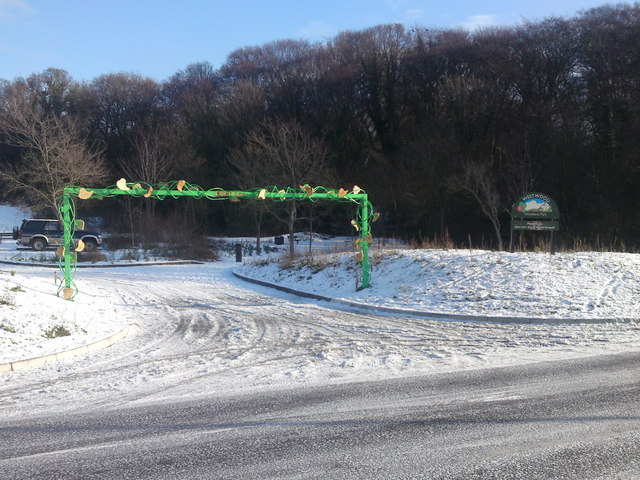
- Interactive map of Westwood Woodland Park
- Type: Local Nature Reserve
- Location: Southampton, Hampshire
- OS grid: SU 454 095
- Area: 49.5 hectares (122 acres)
- Manager: Hampshire County Council and Southampton City Council

Westwood Woodland Park is a 49.5-hectare (122-acre) Local Nature Reserve in Southampton in Hampshire. It is owned by Hampshire County Council and managed by Hampshire County Council and Southampton City Council. The site is split in two by a stream, the 'Tickleford Gully'. The park forms the boundary of Southampton and Netley.

== History ==
In the Middle Ages this park was part of the estate of Netley Abbey. To the north of the park, Conduits can be found, which previously supplied the Abbey, and later Netley Castle, with water. This system also created many of the ponds that still exist on the site. This system is now a scheduled monument.

Upon the closure of the Abbey in 1536, the park, along with the Abbey, would be given to Sir William Paulet. In this period, part of the farmland was then rented to tenants.

In 1826, the park, with both the Abbey ruins and the Castle, were inherited by William Chamberlayne. The park was managed by a gamekeeper, likely for the purpose of shooting.

During World War Two, the site was used for an Artillery emplacement. The site was picked due to its good cover and proximity to the Supermarine factory in Woolston, which produced the Spitfire. The concrete base remains in place today.

During the 20th century, part of the site was a gravel pit, which later became a landfill. This can still be seen today, with the park having a large hill within it, alongside some disused access roads.

In 1986, the park was bought by the council, with the grasslands being restored. It then opened to the public.

== Wildlife ==
Its habitats include ancient woodland, with haze coppice and oaks, streams, ponds, marshes and grassland. There are several rare beetles, and birds include barn owls, skylarks, linnets and meadow pipits.
