= Yoell's Copse =

Nature reserve in Hampshire, England

Coordinates: 50.911°N 1.021°W

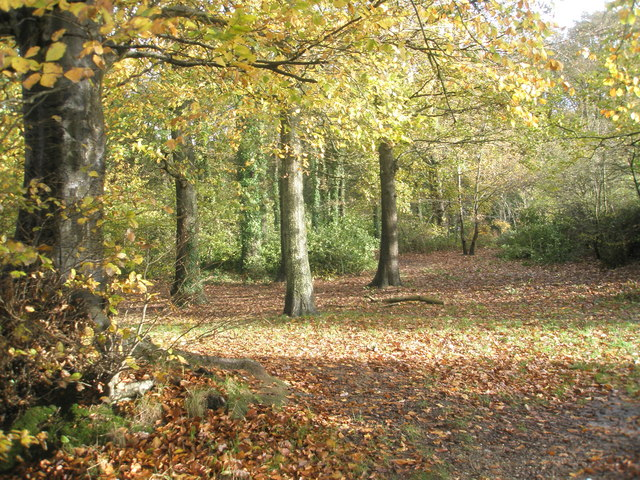
- Interactive map of Yoell's Copse
- Type: Local Nature Reserve
- Location: Horndean, Hampshire
- OS grid: SU 689 129
- Area: 5.5 hectares (14 acres)
- Manager: Horndean Parish Council

Yoell's Copse is a 5.5-hectare (14-acre) Local Nature Reserve in Horndean in Hampshire. It is owned and managed by Horndean Parish Council.

This ancient wood has coppiced mature oak trees and wild service trees. There are uncommon plants such as butcher's-broom and common cow-wheat.
