= Shawford Down =

Nature reserve in Hampshire, England

Coordinates: 51.021°N 1.331°W

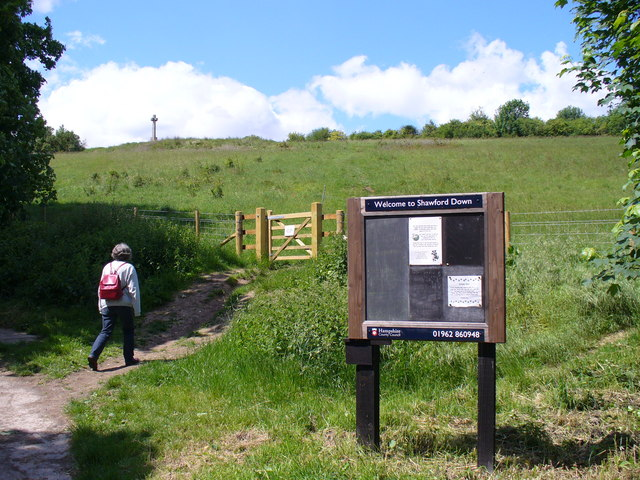
- Interactive map of Shawford Down
- Type: Local Nature Reserve
- Location: Winchester, Hampshire
- OS grid: SU 470 248
- Area: 19.6 hectares (48 acres)
- Manager: Hampshire Countryside Service

Shawford Down is a 19.6-hectare (48-acre) Local Nature Reserve south of Winchester in Hampshire. It is owned by Hampshire County Council and managed by Hampshire Countryside Service.

The down has strip lynchets, dating to the period in the Middle Ages when the area was cultivated as common land. The site has a range of chalk grassland habitats, with flora including wild parsnip, red bartsia, cowslip and common rock-rose. There are also areas of woodland and scrub.
