= Oxenbourne Down, Clanfield =

Nature reserve in Hampshire, England

Coordinates: 50.966°N 0.986°W

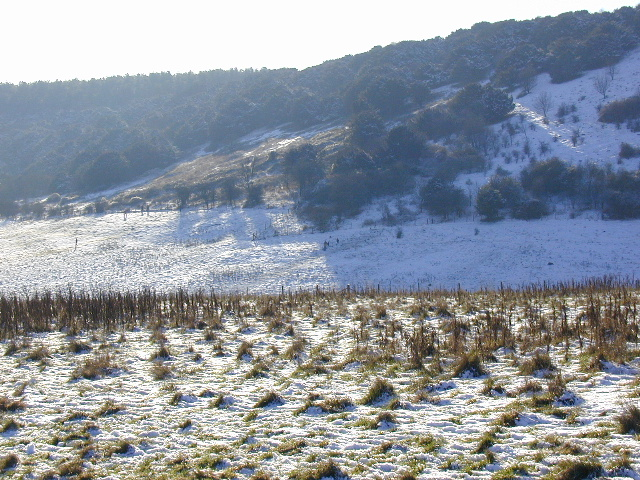
- Interactive map of Oxenbourne Down, Clanfield
- Type: Local Nature Reserve
- Location: Clanfield, Hampshire
- OS grid: SU 713 190
- Area: 84.8 hectares (210 acres)
- Manager: Hampshire County Council

Oxenbourne Down, Clanfield is an 84.8-hectare (210-acre) Local Nature Reserve north of Clanfield in Hampshire. It is owned and managed by Hampshire County Council. It is part of Butser Hill, which is a Special Area of Conservation and Site of Special Scientific Interest.

This is part of Queen Elizabeth Country Park. It has unimproved grassland on low fertility soils, which is controlled by grazing. There are also areas of ancient semi-natural woodland.
