= Chessel Bay =

Local Nature Reserve in Southampton, England

Coordinates: 50.91120°N 1.37553°W

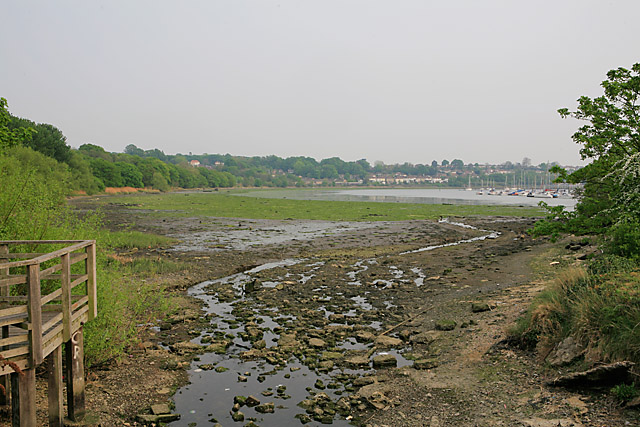
- Chessel Bay at low tide
- Interactive map of Chessel Bay
- Type: Local Nature Reserve
- Location: Southampton, Hampshire
- OS grid: SU 440 128
- Area: 12.9 hectares (32 acres)
- Manager: Southampton City Council

Chessel Bay is a 12.9-hectare (32-acre) Local Nature Reserve on the east bank of the River Itchen in Southampton in Hampshire. It is owned and managed by Southampton City Council. It is part of Solent and Southampton Water Ramsar site and Special Protection Area, and of Lee-on-The Solent to Itchen Estuary, which is a Site of Special Scientific Interest. It has been a local nature reserve since 1989

It comprises a narrow strip of woodland, a parallel strip of shingle and saltmarsh and a substantial area of mudflats. At low tide the mudflats are exposed attracting wading birds and wildfowl: curlew, oystercatchers and dunlin can be seen throughout the year. In winter, the site is also used as a stop-over for other migrating birds such as brent geese.

At low tide, mudflats are exposed, and these attract feeding estuary birds. The mudflats are also nationally and internationally important. Local volunteers, Friends of Chessel Bay, team up with the City Council twice a year to combat the large amount of litter which accumulates in the bay, and carry out management of the Reserve. The reserve suffers from high levels of plastic pollution due to its position on the bend of Itchen.
