= Herbert Plantation =

Nature reserve in Hampshire, England

Coordinates: 51.357°N 1.318°W

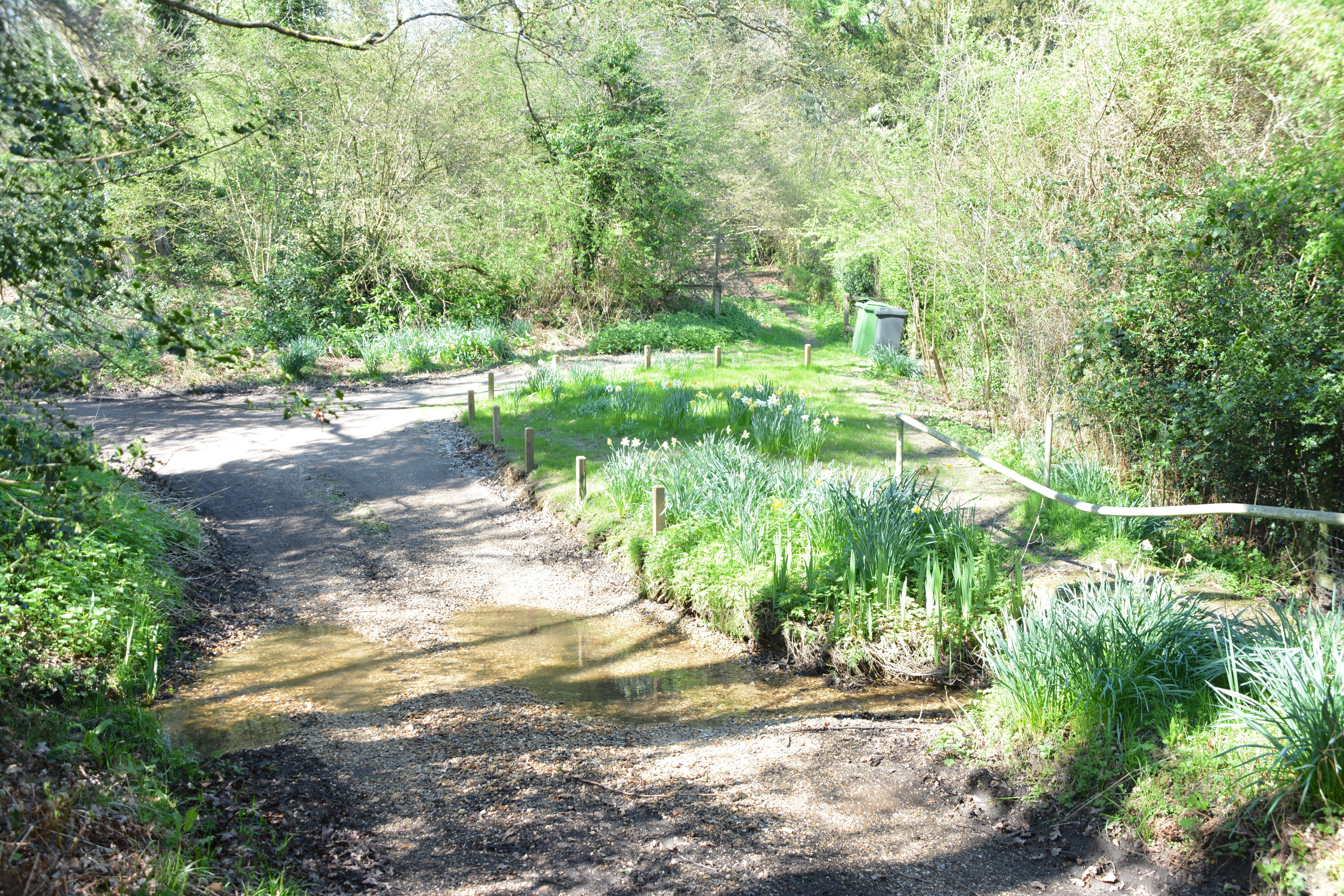
- Interactive map of Herbert Plantation
- Type: Local Nature Reserve
- Location: Burghclere, Hampshire
- OS grid: SU 476 622
- Area: 25.6 hectares (63 acres)
- Manager: Hampshire Countryside Service

Herbert Plantation is a 25.6-hectare (63-acre) Local Nature Reserve north of Burghclere in Hampshire. It is owned by Hampshire County Council and managed by Hampshire Countryside Service.

The reserve is named after its former owner, Herbert Fox, who died in World War II. It has oak, birch, alder and pine, and ground flora includes some species typical of ancient woodland, such as common solomon's-seal and wood sorrel. Invertebrates include 22 species of butterfly, such as silver-washed fritillary and white admiral.
