= Tadburn Meadows =

Nature reserve

Coordinates: 50.992°N 1.476°W

- Interactive map of Tadburn Meadows
- Type: Local Nature Reserve
- Location: Romsey, Hampshire
- OS grid: SU 369 215
- Area: 5.1 hectares (13 acres)
- Manager: Test Valley Borough Council

Tadburn Meadows is a 5.1-hectare (13-acre) Local Nature Reserve in Romsey in Hampshire. It is owned and managed by Test Valley Borough Council.

Tadburn Lake runs through this valley site, which has wet willow and alder woodland lower down and dry habitats higher up. Fauna include green woodpeckers, kingfishers and water voles. There is grassland south of the brook.
