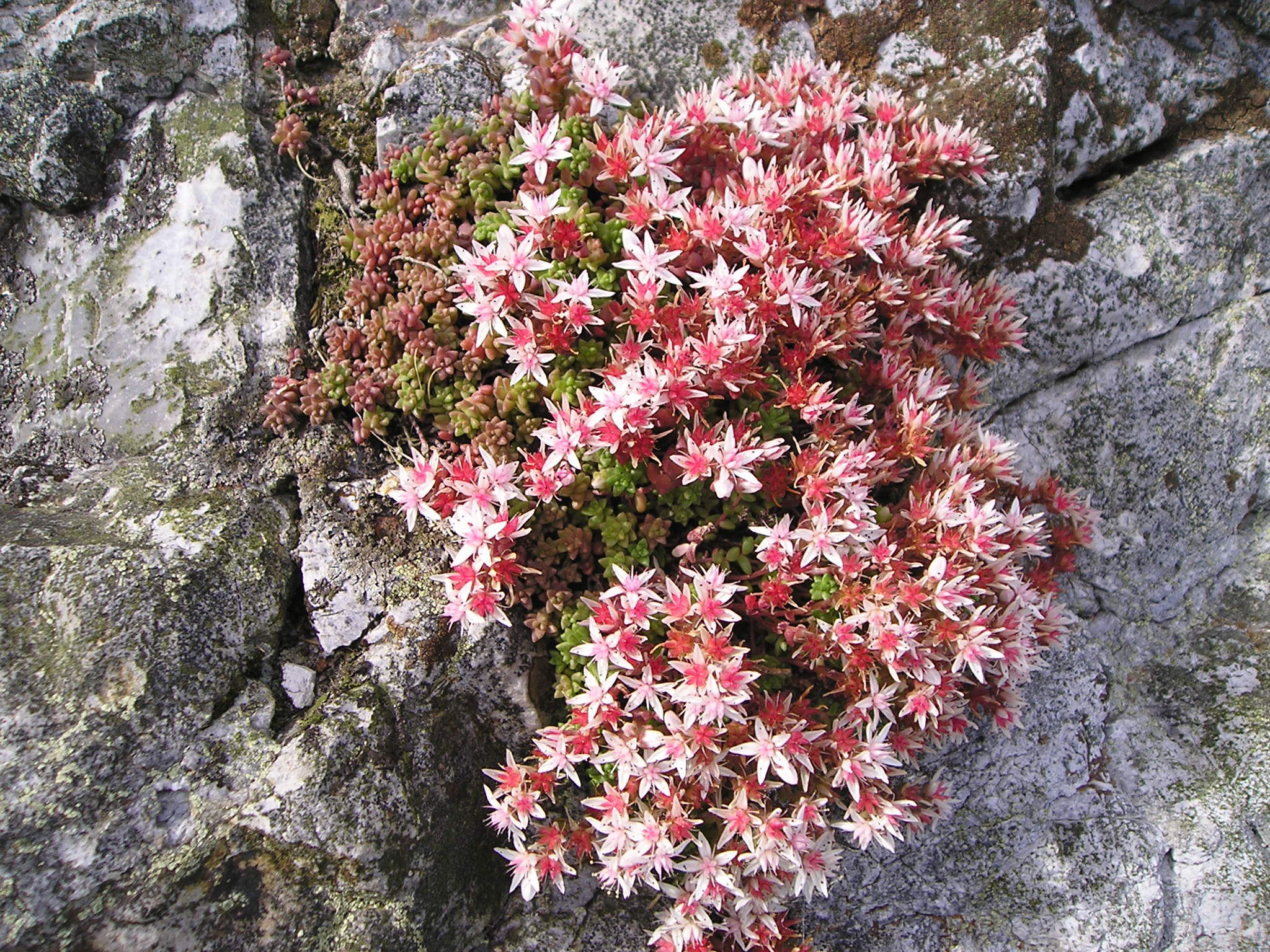

Scientific classification
- Kingdom: Plantae
- Clade: Tracheophytes
- Clade: Angiosperms
- Clade: Eudicots
- Order: Saxifragales
- Family: Crassulaceae
- Genus: Sedum
- Species: S. anglicum

Binomial name
- Sedum anglicum Huds.

= Sedum anglicum =

Species of succulent

Sedum anglicum, the English stonecrop, is a species of flowering plant in the genus Sedum in the family Crassulaceae.

== Description ==
Sedum anglicum is a low-growing perennial with stubby, succulent, untoothed, alternate leaves. These are often greyish-green, and may turn pink in dry conditions. The flowers are short-stalked and star-like, white (sometimes tinged pink), with ten contrasting stamens and five carpels. The fruits are red.

== Distribution and habitat ==
Sedum anglicum occurs in western Europe, including Norway, Sweden, Ireland, Great Britain, France, Portugal and Spain. It is usually found on dry rocks, walls and sand dunes, often near the sea. It prefers thin, acidic soils and thrives in rock crevices and on cliffs, and also grows inland on walls and hedge banks. In Great Britain, it is much more common in the west of the country than in the east.
