= Liss Riverside Railway Walk North =

Nature reserve in Hampshire, England

Coordinates: 51.051°N 0.890°W

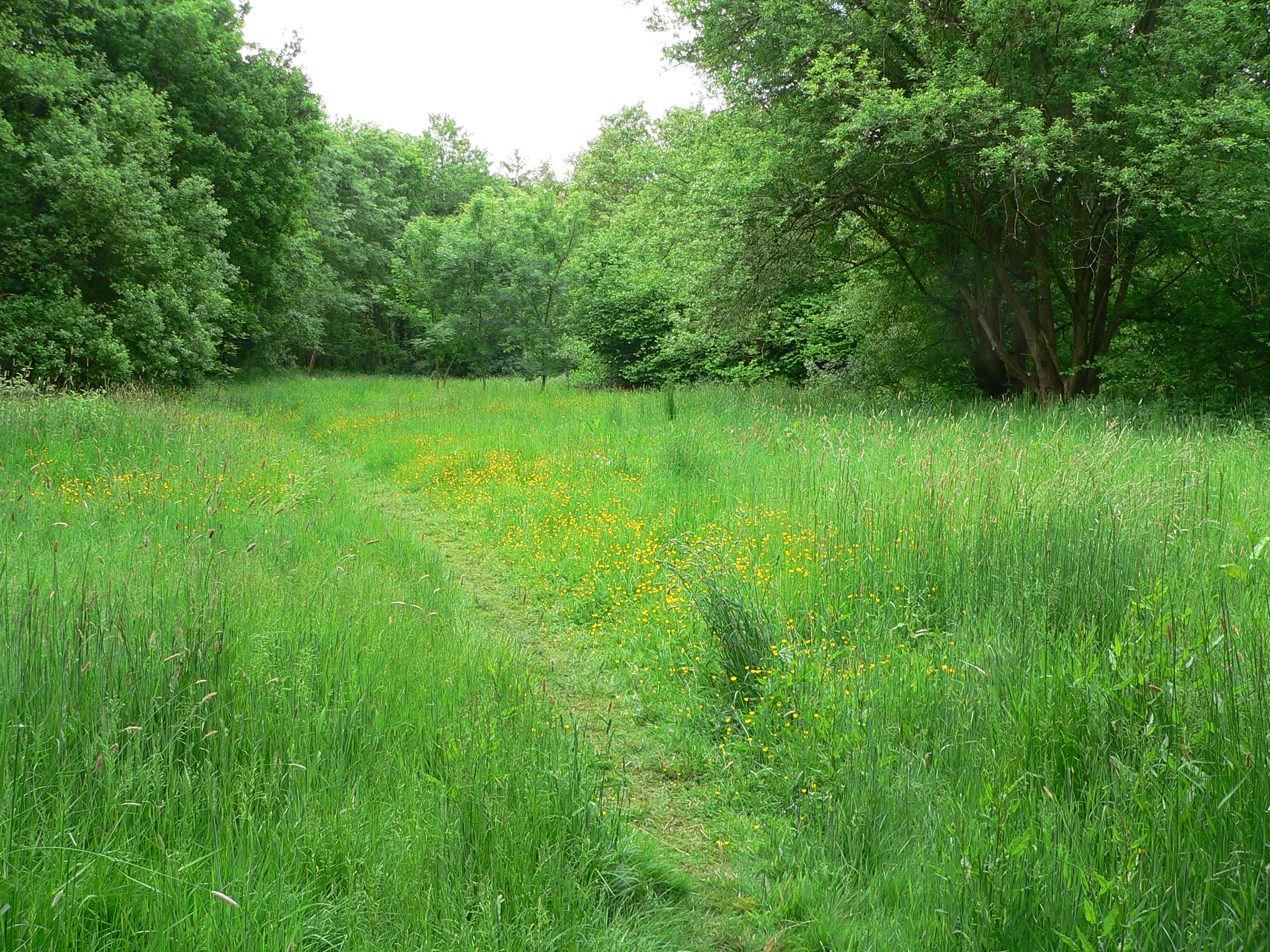
- Interactive map of Liss Riverside Railway Walk North
- Type: Local Nature Reserve
- Location: Liss, Hampshire
- OS grid: SU 779 285
- Area: 6.9 hectares (17 acres)
- Manager: East Hampshire District Council

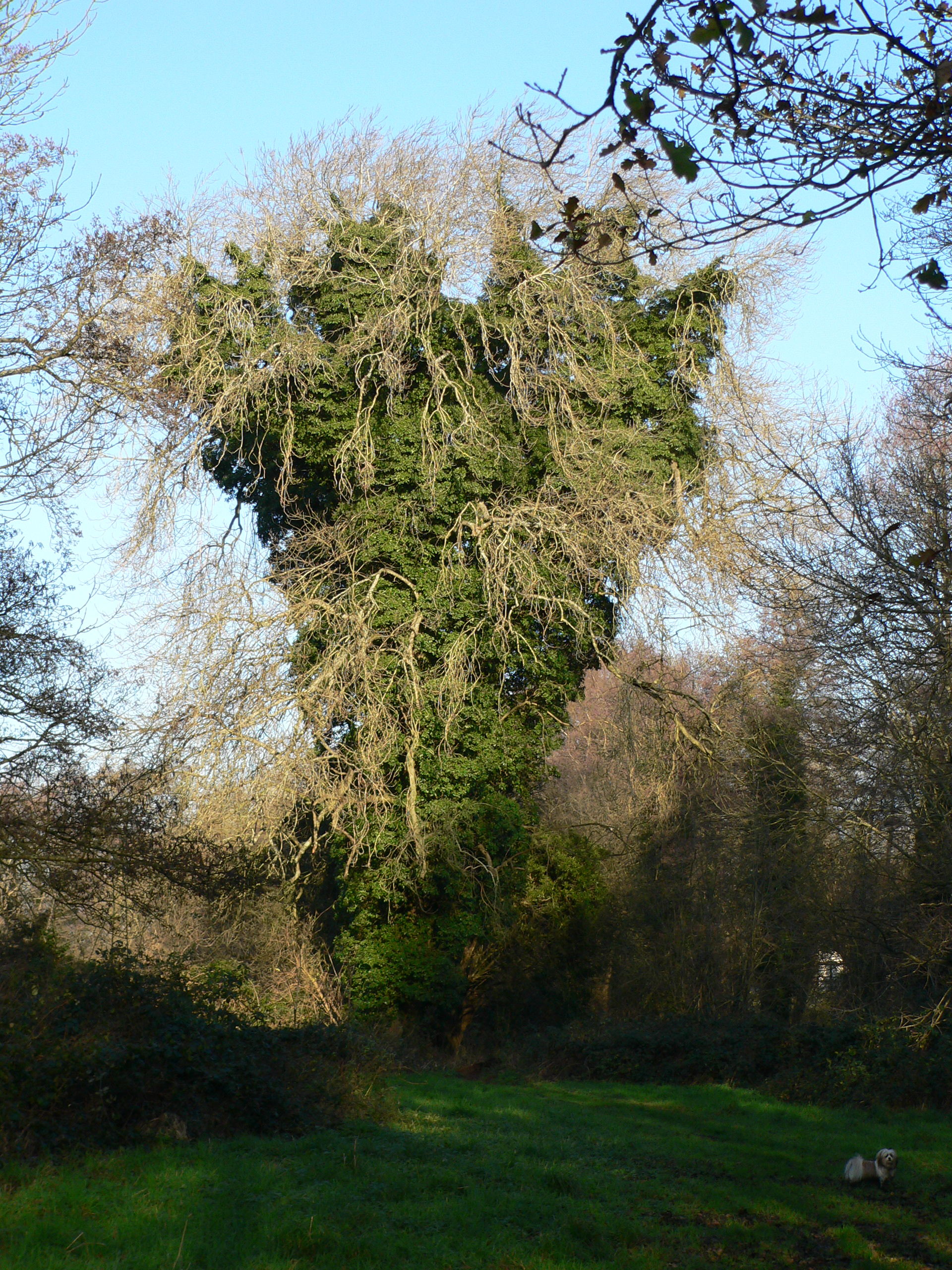
Ash tree covered with ivy

Liss Riverside Railway Walk North is a 6.9-hectare (17-acre) Local Nature Reserve which runs north from Liss in Hampshire. It is owned and managed by East Hampshire District Council.

This footpath follows part of the route of the former Longmoor Military Railway from Liss to Liss Forest. The path goes through willow and alder woodland.

The site was managed by volunteers: Liss Conservation Volunteers from 1993 to 2007, renamed Liss Conservation Rangers from 2007 to 2026.

Since the Liss Conservation Rangers ceased operations in 2023 the management of the Nature Reserve has been directly undertaken by East Hants District Council. Liss Conservation Rangers gained a licence through Liss Parish Council to restart operations in 2025. EHDC produced a Ten Year Management Plan to manage the site. Today EHDC works with the Rangers to manage the bamble and keep paths clear.

The site has 7 bridges and 2 shipwrightsway stones. It is a popular site for dog walkers and those who enjoy a forest stroll.
