= Gesomyrmex macrops =

Gesomyrmex macrops Temporal range: Priabonian

Scientific classification
- Kingdom: Animalia
- Phylum: Arthropoda
- Class: Insecta
- Order: Hymenoptera
- Family: Formicidae
- Subfamily: Formicinae
- Genus: Gesomyrmex
- Species: †G. macrops

Binomial name
- †Gesomyrmex macrops Dlussky, Rasnitsyn & Perfilieva, 2015

Extinct species of ant

Gesomyrmex macrops is an extinct species of formicid in the ant subfamily Formicinae known from a fossil found in eastern Asia.

== History and classification ==
Gesomyrmex macrops is known from a single ant found in Russia. The specimen was described from a compression fossil preserved in diatomite deposits of the Bol’shaya Svetlovodnaya site. Located in the Pozharsky District, on the Pacific Coast of Russia, the fossil-bearing rocks preserve possibly Priabonian plants and animals which lived in a small lake near a volcano. The site has been attributed to either the Maksimovka or Salibez Formations and compared to the Bembridge Marls and Florissant Formation, both of which are Priabonian in age.

At the time of description, the holotype specimen, number PIN 3429/1162 was preserved in the A. A. Borissiak Paleontological Institute collections, part of the Russian Academy of Sciences. The fossil, a partial winged queen, was first described by the trio of paleomyrmecologists Gennady Dlussky, Alexandr Rasnitsyn and Ksenia Perfilieva. In the type description, Dlussky, Rasnitsyn and Perfilieva named the species G. macrops, with the specific epithet derived from the Latin macrops meaning "with large eyes".

The notably large compound eyes of G. macrops give a large eye diameter to head length ratio, distinguishing the species from the other two Gesomyrmex described from Bol’shaya Svetlovodnaya, Gesomyrmex incertus and Gesomyrmex magnus. While large compound eyes are also found on the fossil species Gesomyrmex germanicus and Gesomyrmex pulcher of Germany, both differ in the shape of the head capsule. In addition to the different head capsule shape G. pulcher is also only about half as long as G. macrops.

== Description ==
The holotype queen is approximately 9.7 mm (0.38 in) with the wings absent from the fossil. The head capsule is rectangular, being shorter in width than it is long. The rear corners are rounded, the back edge is convex and the sides of the head are faintly concave. The mandibles have four total teeth on the chewing margins, and the antennae scapes do not extend further than the middle point of the large eyes. The legs are short and have a thick appearance, while the petiole is low and similar in height and length.
