= Barton Group =

- Stratigraphic range: Lutetian - Priabonian
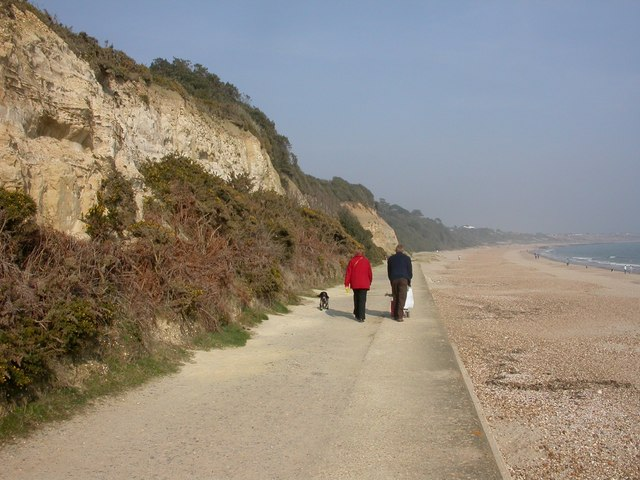
- Boscombe Sand Formation near the base of the Barton Group, at Friar's Cliff near Highcliffe
- Type: Group
- Sub-units: Boscombe Sand Formation, Barton Clay Formation, Chama Sand Formation & Becton Sand Formation
- Underlies: Solent Group
- Overlies: Bracklesham Group
- Thickness: ~190 m

Lithology
- Primary: clay
- Other: sand

Location
- Region: Hampshire Basin, England
- Country: United Kingdom

Type section
- Named for: Barton on Sea

The Barton Group is a geological group found in the Hampshire Basin of Southern England. It ranges in age from Lutetian (Lower Eocene) to Priabonian (Upper Eocene). It is exposed on the coast in southern Hampshire and in the northern part of the Isle of Wight. The type section is sea cliffs east of Christchurch, between Cliff End and Paddy's Gap.

The Barton Group corresponds with the Bartonian age, which spans the time between 41.2 and 37.8 Ma in the middle Eocene epoch.
