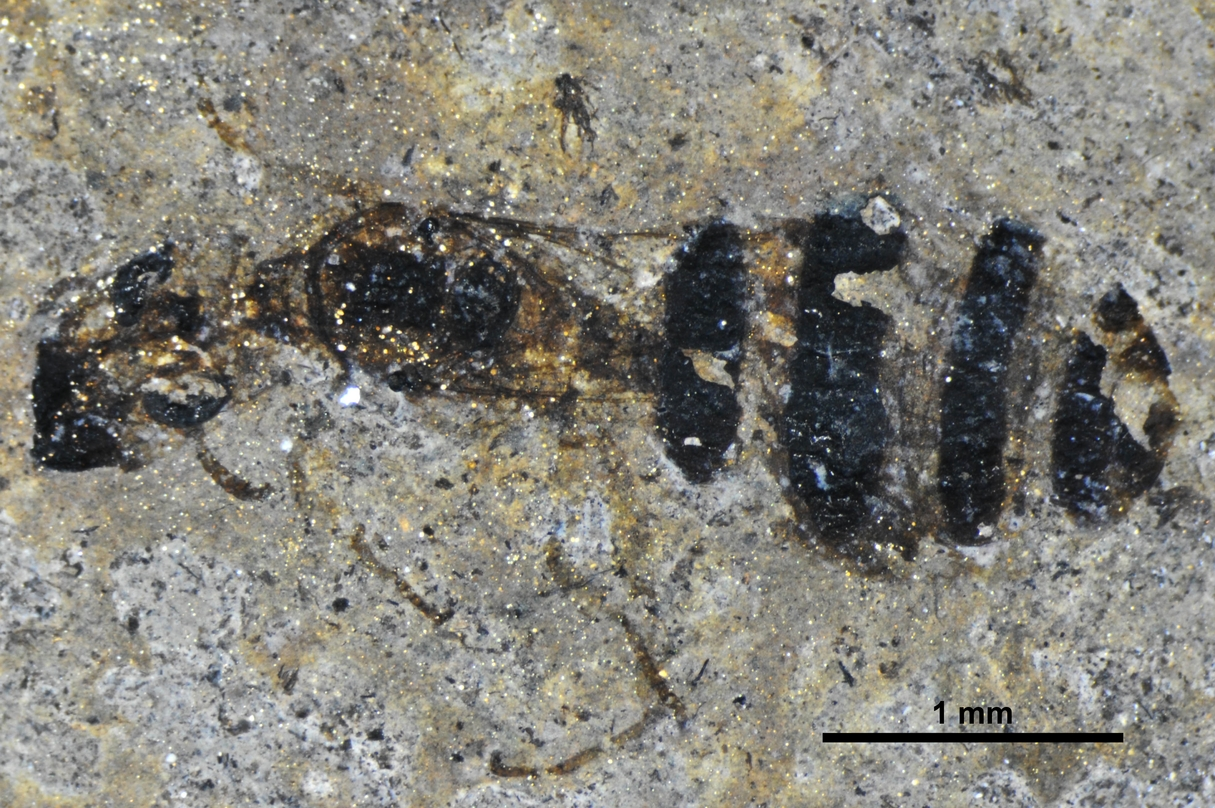
- Gesomyrmex pulcher holotype

Scientific classification
- Kingdom: Animalia
- Phylum: Arthropoda
- Class: Insecta
- Order: Hymenoptera
- Family: Formicidae
- Subfamily: Formicinae
- Genus: Gesomyrmex
- Species: †G. pulcher

Binomial name
- †Gesomyrmex pulcher Dlussky, Wappler, & Wedmann, 2009

= Gesomyrmex pulcher =

Gesomyrmex pulcher Temporal range: Lutetian

Extinct species of ant

Gesomyrmex pulcher is an extinct species of ant in the subfamily Formicinae known from an Eocene fossil found in Europe. G. pulcher is one of only eight species in the ant genus Gesomyrmex to have been described from fossils found in Europe.

== History and classification ==
When described, Gesomyrmex pulcher was known from a solitary fossil insect which is a compression-impression fossil preserved in a layer of soft sedimentary rock. Along with other well preserved insect fossils, the G. pulcher specimen was collected from layers of the Lutetian Messel pit World Heritage Site. The formation is composed of brown coals, oil shales, and bituminous shale, which preserved numerous insects, fish, birds, reptiles, and terrestrial mammals as a notable lagerstätten. The area is a preserved maar lake which initially formed approximately 47 million years ago as the result of volcanic explosions.

At the time of description, the holotype specimen, number SMF MeI 10999, was preserved in the Senckenberg Research Station Messel fossil collections. The insect was first studied by German entomologists Gennady Dlussky, Torsten Wappler and Sonja Wedmann; their 2009 type description of the new species was published in the electronic journal Zootaxa. The specific epithet pulcher is Latin, meaning "beautiful".

The species is one of eight Gesomyrmex species, all of which have been described from European fossils. Three species were described prior to G. pulcher, G. bremii in 1849, G. hoernesi in 1868, and G. miegi in 1937. The remaining four species; G. breviceps, G. curiosus, G. flavescens, and G. germanicus were all described by Dlussky et al in the same 2009 paper as G. pulcher. Six modern Gesomyrmex species have been described so far, all from the tropical regions of Asia, creating a disjunct distribution between the fossil species and the modern species.

== Description ==
The Gesomyrmex pulcher specimen is a partially preserved adult queen, which was fossilized with her dorsal side facing upwards and the attached wings folded along her back. The overall length of the queen is approximately 4.8 mm (0.19 in) and the head has an estimated length of 0.95 mm (0.037 in). The antennae are slender in appearance, composed of a scape which extends to the middle of the eye and ten funicular segments which are either shorter than they are wide, or equal in height and width.
