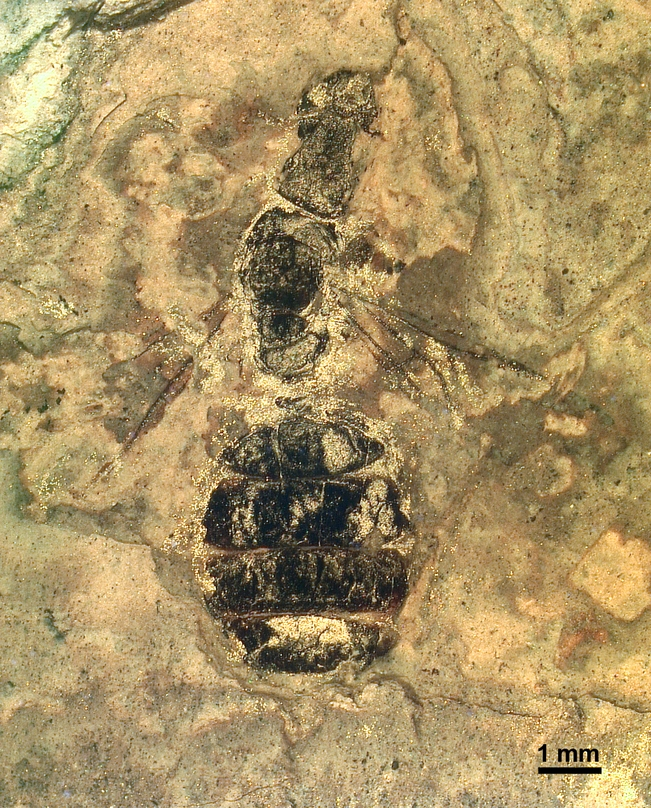
- G. germanicus holotype

Scientific classification
- Domain: Eukaryota
- Kingdom: Animalia
- Phylum: Arthropoda
- Class: Insecta
- Order: Hymenoptera
- Family: Formicidae
- Subfamily: Formicinae
- Genus: Gesomyrmex
- Species: †G. germanicus

Binomial name
- †Gesomyrmex germanicus Dlussky, Wappler, & Wedmann, 2009

= Gesomyrmex germanicus =

Gesomyrmex germanicus Temporal range: Lutetian

Extinct species of ant

Gesomyrmex germanicus is an extinct species of ant in the subfamily Formicinae known from an Eocene fossil found in Europe. G. germanicus is one of only eight species in the ant genus Gesomyrmex to have been described from fossils found in Europe.

== History and classification ==
When described Gesomyrmex germanicus was known from a group of four insects which are compression-impression fossils preserved in a layer of soft sedimentary rock. Along with other well preserved insect fossils, the G. germanicus specimens were collected from layers of the Lutetian Eckfeld maar. The formation is composed of Brown coals, oil shales, and Bituminous shale which preserved numerous insects, fish, birds, reptiles, and terrestrial mammals as a notable lagerstätten. The area is a preserved maar lake which initially formed approximately 47 million years ago as the result of volcanic explosions.

At the time of description, the type series consisted of the holotype specimen, NHMM PE-1997/29 and paratype specimen NHMM PE-1998/13; along with two additional fossils NHMM PE-1998/1 and NHMM PE-1998/9. They were preserved in the Landessammlung fur Naturkunde Rheinland-Pfalz fossil collections. The insects were first studied by German entomologists Gennady Dlussky, Torsten Wappler and Sonja Wedmann, with their 2009 type description of the new species being published in the electronic journal Zootaxa. The specific epithet germanicus is derived from Germany, the country where the fossils are found.

The species is one of eight Gesomyrmex species, all of which have been described from European fossils. Three species were described prior to G. germanicus, G. bremii in 1849, G. hoernesi in 1868, and G. miegi in 1937. The remaining four species; G. breviceps, G. curiosus, G. flavescens, and G. pulcher were all described by Dlussky et al in the same 2009 paper as G. germanicus. Six modern species have been described so far, all from the Tropical regions of Asia, creating a disjunct distribution between the fossil species and the modern species.

== Description ==
The Gesomyrmex germanicus specimens are partially preserved queen caste adults which are fossilized with their dorsal side facing upwards and the attached wings folded along their back. The overall length of the hoplotype queen is approximately 9–10 mm (0.35–0.39 in) and the head has an estimated length of 2.0 mm (0.079 in). The antennae are slender in appearance, composed of a scape which extends to the middle of the eye and an undetermined number of funicular segments. The overall coloration of the body is black, while the wings are preserved as clear, with darkened pterostigma.
