= Ernest Burton =

Ernest Burton may refer to:

- Ernest DeWitt Burton (1856–1925), American biblical scholar
- Ernest Burton (American football), former college football head coach
- Ernest St. John Burton, English artist, composer, musician, author, and geologist
