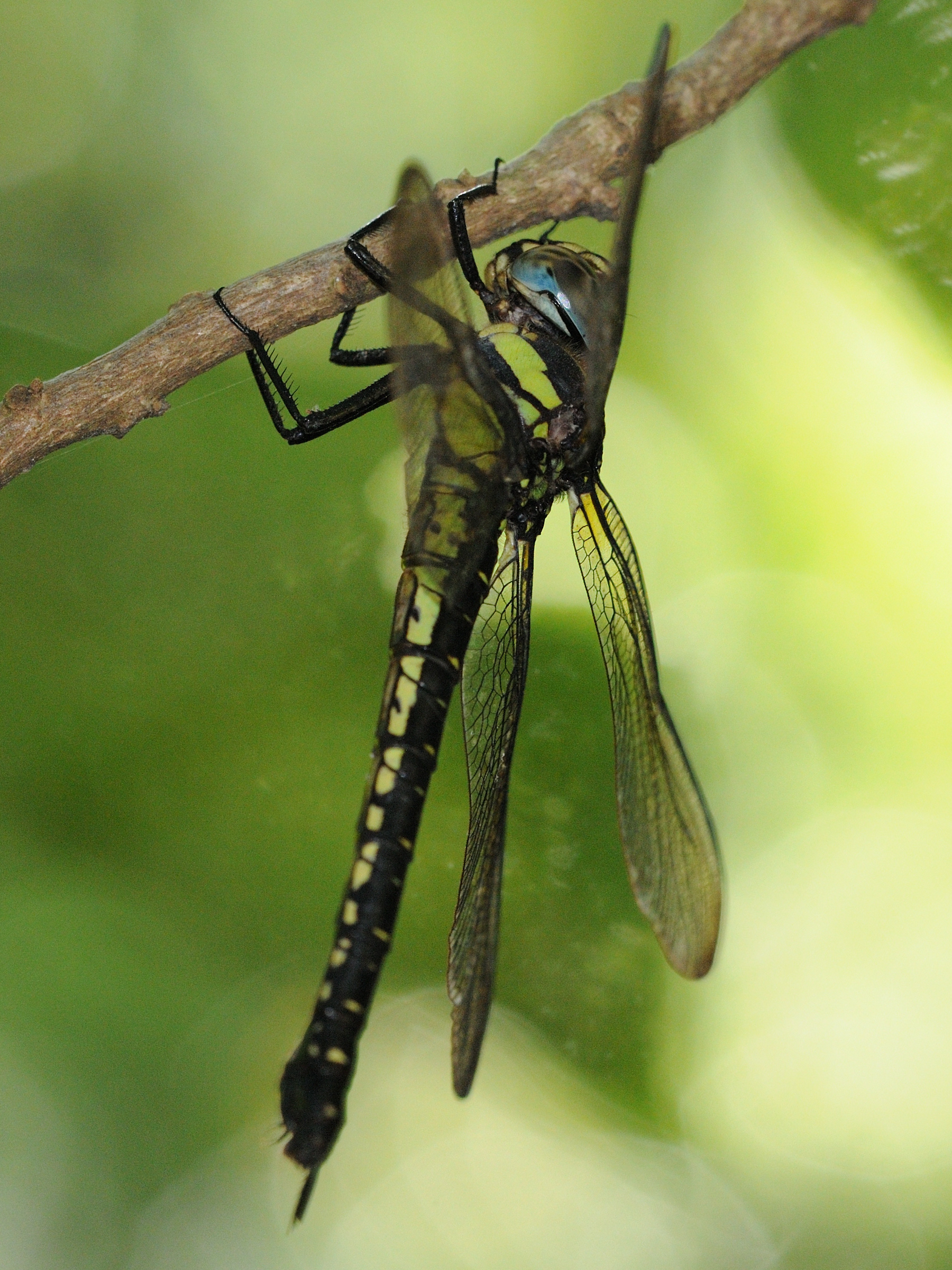
- Female A. anisoptera from Japan

Scientific classification
- Kingdom: Animalia
- Phylum: Arthropoda
- Clade: Pancrustacea
- Class: Insecta
- Order: Odonata
- Infraorder: Anisoptera
- Family: Aeshnidae
- Genus: Aeschnophlebia
- Species: A. anisoptera

Binomial name
- Aeschnophlebia anisoptera Selys, 1883

Synonyms
- Brachytron anisopterum (Selys,1883)

= Aeschnophlebia anisoptera =

Species of dragonfly

Aeschnophlebia anisoptera is a species of dragonfly in the family Aeshnidae found in China, Japan, South Korea, and North Korea. It is in the genus Aeschnophlebia, which was established by Edmond de Sélys Longchamps. The males and females of the species are very distinct from one another, the males are much more blue.

== Description ==
Aeschnophlebia anisoptera look very different based on the sex that the dragonfly is. The males have an overall very blue complexion. Their eyes are a lighter blue with grayish spots in them. The blue on the rest of the face and body is a much deeper color, with patterns of bright yellow striping their thorax and speckling their abdomens. The wings have a slightly yellow tinge on the ends and the pterostigma is light yellow in color. Additionally, the males have an extra terminal abdominal appendage similar of that to Aeschnophlebia longistigma, the females of both species do not possess it.

Contrastingly, the females have very little blue on them, only their eyes are a light blue similar to the males, also with grayish spots. The rest of the face, thorax, and abdomen are all black with stripes of yellow. Although they do not have the extra terminal abdominal appendage, females possess longer and less sharp looking cerci at the end of their abdomens. The wings also have a slightly yellow tinge on the ends, but it is less pronounced than the males, the pterostigma are also less colored.

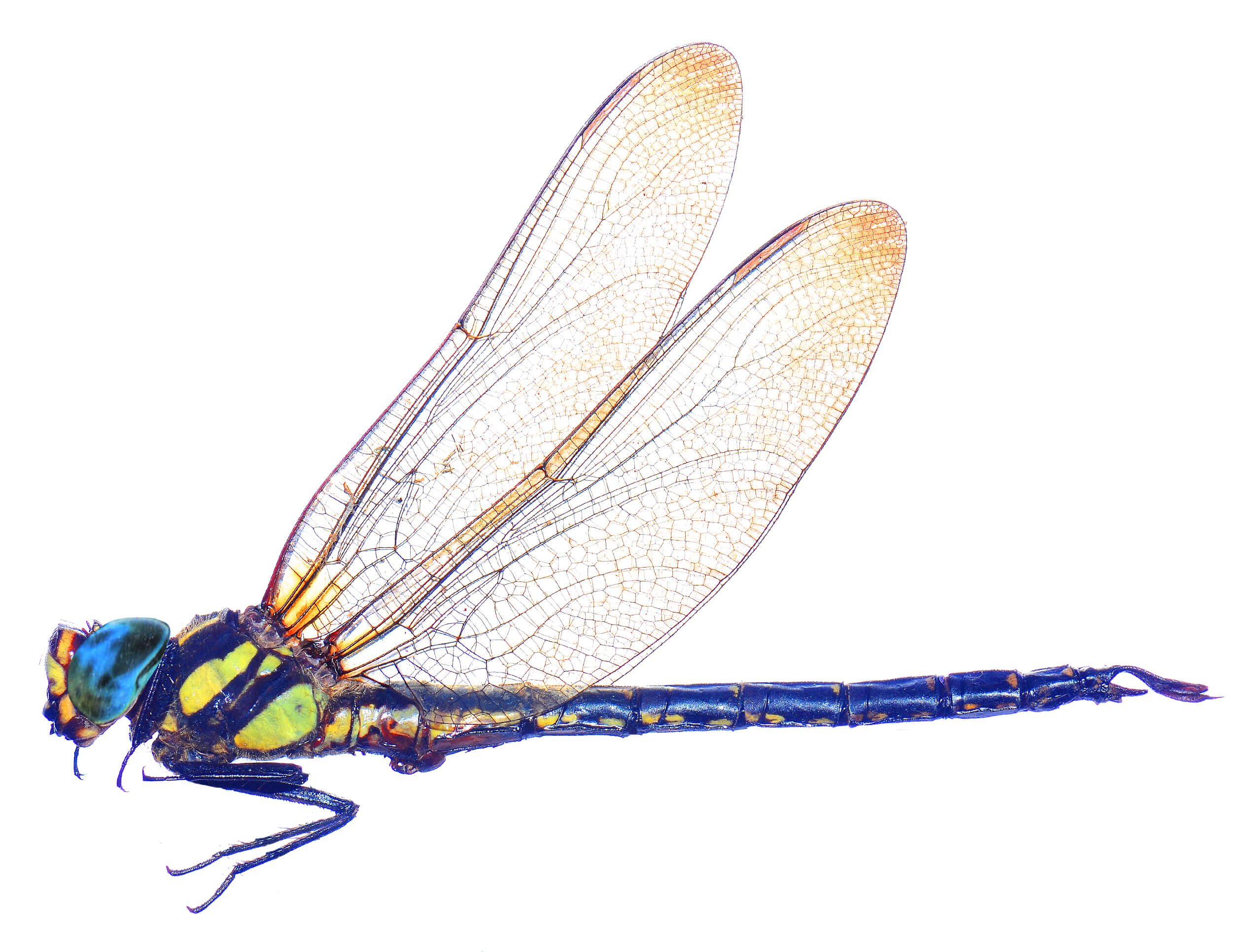
Male A. anisoptera

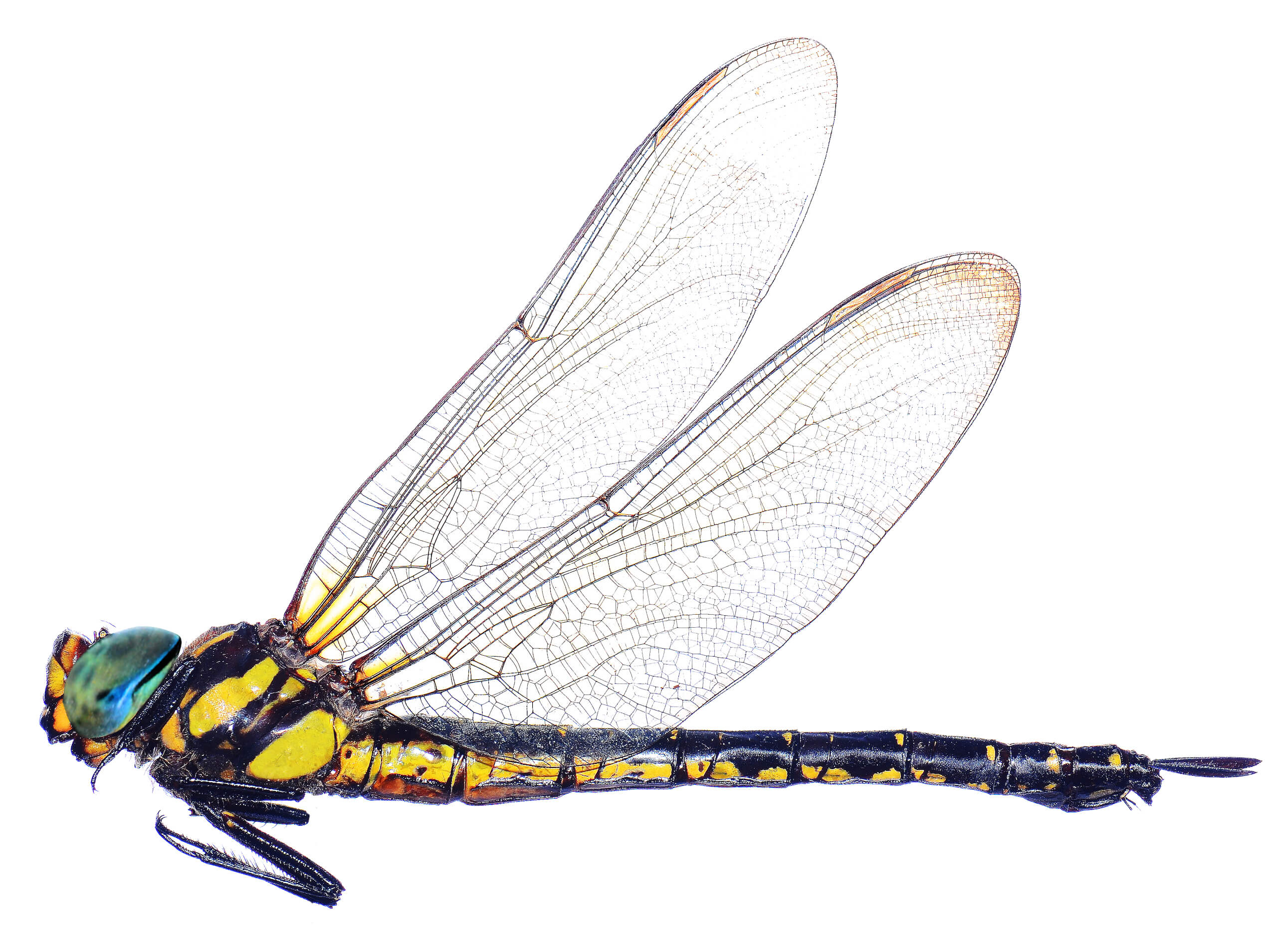
Female A. anisoptera

== Habitat and conservation ==
It prefers to live in wetlands that have plenty of plant life. In China, it is mainly distributed in the Zhejiang region. There have also been sightings of it on Jeju island in Korea and pictures of it taken in Japan. There are still efforts to better conserve the areas that it is found in, but the IUCN lists another dragonfly in the same genus found in similar areas as least concern.
