= Gesomyrmex incertus =

Gesomyrmex incertus Temporal range: Priabonian

Scientific classification
- Kingdom: Animalia
- Phylum: Arthropoda
- Class: Insecta
- Order: Hymenoptera
- Family: Formicidae
- Subfamily: Formicinae
- Genus: Gesomyrmex
- Species: †G. incertus

Binomial name
- †Gesomyrmex incertus Dlussky, Rasnitsyn & Perfilieva, 2015

Extinct species of ant

Gesomyrmex incertus is an extinct species of formicid in the ant subfamily Formicinae known from a fossil found in eastern Asia.

== History and classification ==
Gesomyrmex incertus is known from a single ant found in Russia. The specimen was described from a compression fossil preserved in diatomite deposits of the Bol’shaya Svetlovodnaya site. The site is exposed on the bank of Barachek Creek 3 km (1.9 mi) upstream from the creeks confluence with the Bol’shaya Svetlovodnaya River in the Pozharsky District, on the Pacific Coast of Russia. The fossil-bearing rocks preserve possibly Priabonian plants and animals which lived in and around a small lake near a volcano. The site has been attributed to either the Maksimovka or Salibez Formations and compared to the Bembridge Marls and Florissant Formation, both of which are Priabonian in age.

At the time of description, the part and counterpart holotype specimen, PIN 3429/1183 & PIN 3429/1164 was preserved in the A. A. Borissiak Paleontological Institute collections, part of the Russian Academy of Sciences. The fossil, an isolated head of a queen, was first described by the trio of paleomyrmecologists Gennady Dlussky, Alexandr Rasnitsyn, and Ksenia Perfilieva. In the type description, Dlussky, Rasnitsyn, and Perfilieva named the species G. incertus, with the specific epithet derived from the Latin incertus meaning "doubtful".

Gesomyrmex incertus is distinguished from the other two species of Gesomyrmex described from Bol’shaya Svetlovodnaya in several ways. With a 4.2 mm (0.17 in) long head, the queen of Gesomyrmex magnus is much larger than the single G. intertus queen. Gesomyrmex macrops is distinguished from G. intertus in that the queen has a much larger eye diameter to head length than either other species. The shape of the rear edge of the G. intertus head capsule along with the elongated head is unique among the Gesomyrmex species.

== Description ==
The head of the holotype queen is approximately 2.4 mm (0.094 in) long by 1.6 mm (0.063 in) wide. The rectangular head capsule has sides that are almost parallel to each other and ending at rounded back corners. Unlike the other species of Gesomyrmex, the back edge is concave in profile and the sides of the head are faintly concave. The mandibles have four total teeth on the chewing margins.
