= Gesomyrmex magnus =

Gesomyrmex magnus Temporal range: Priabonian

Scientific classification
- Kingdom: Animalia
- Phylum: Arthropoda
- Class: Insecta
- Order: Hymenoptera
- Family: Formicidae
- Subfamily: Formicinae
- Genus: Gesomyrmex
- Species: †G. magnus

Binomial name
- †Gesomyrmex magnus Dlussky, Rasnitsyn & Perfilieva, 2015

Extinct species of ant

Gesomyrmex magnus is an extinct species of formicid in the ant subfamily Formicinae known from a fossil found in eastern Asia.

== History and classification ==
Gesomyrmex magnus is known from a single ant found in Russia. The specimen was described from a compression fossil preserved in diatomite deposits of the Bol’shaya Svetlovodnaya site. Located in the Pozharsky District, on the Pacific Coast of Russia, the fossil-bearing rocks preserve possibly Priabonian plants and animals which lived in a small lake near a volcano. The site has been attributed to either the Maksimovka or Salibez Formations and compared to the Bembridge Marls and Florissant Formation, both of which are Priabonian in age.

At the time of description, the holotype specimen, number PIN 3429/101, was preserved in the A. A. Borissiak Paleontological Institute collections, part of the Russian Academy of Sciences. The fossil, a nearly whole winged queen in dorsal view, was first described by the trio of paleomyrmecologists Gennady Dlussky, Alexandr Rasnitsyn and Ksenia Perfilieva. In the type description, Dlussky, Rasnitsyn and Perfilieva named the species G. magnus, with the specific epithet derived from the Latin magnus meaning "large" in reference to its size compared to all other species.

With its notably large body size, G. magnus is distinct from the other two species of Gesomyrmex described from Bol’shaya Svetlovodnaya, Gesomyrmex incertus and Gesomyrmex macrops. All other described extinct and living Gesomyrmex species have queens that are less than 11 mm (0.43 in).

== Description ==
The holotype queen is approximately 20.5 mm (0.81 in) with a fore-wing partially preserved and the hind-wings absent from the fossil. The head capsule is almost square in outline, being just a little shorter in width than it is long. The rear corners are rounded, the back edge is convex and the sides of the head are faintly concave. The big triangular mandibles have a large tooth at the outer end of the chewing margin, but the rest of that margin is not well enough preserved to determine if other teeth were present. Though the antennae scapes are not preserved, the basal three antennae segments are, and show the scape to not have extended further than the middle point of the eyes. The legs are short and have a thick appearance, while the gaster oval in shape and the fore-wings were approximately 12.5 mm (0.49 in) long.
