= Solent Group =

- Stratigraphic range: Priabonian - Rupelian
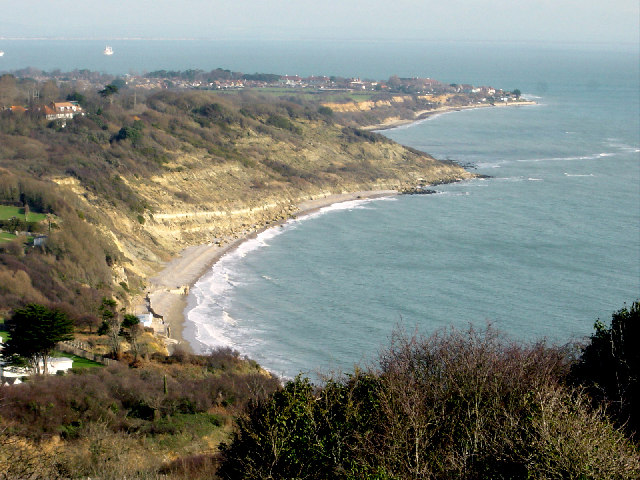
- Bembridge Limestone Formation (harder white weathering layers) and overlying clays of the Bouldnor Formation at the northern end of Whitecliff Bay, Isle of Wight.
- Type: Group
- Sub-units: Headon Hill Formation, Bembridge Limestone Formation & Bouldnor Formation
- Underlies: Quaternary at an unconformity
- Overlies: Barton Group
- Thickness: up to 190 m

Location
- Region: Hampshire Basin, England
- Country: United Kingdom

Type section
- Named for: Solent

The Solent Group is a geological group in the Hampshire Basin of southern England. It preserves fossils ranging in age from Priabonian (uppermost Eocene) to Rupelian (lower Oligocene). The group is subdivided into three formations, the Headon Hill Formation, the Bembridge Limestone Formation and the Bouldnor Formation.

== See also ==
- List of fossiliferous stratigraphic units in England
