= Marsh Farm Formation =

Geologic formation

- Stratigraphic range: Lutetian
- Type: Formation
- Unit of: Bracklesham Group
- Underlies: Selsey Sand Formation
- Overlies: Earnley Sand Formation
- Thickness: 12 - 13.5 m

Lithology
- Primary: clay, sand

Location
- Region: England
- Country: United Kingdom
- Extent: Eastern Hampshire Basin

The Marsh Farm Formation is a geologic formation in England. It preserves fossils dating back to the Paleogene period.

== See also ==
- List of fossiliferous stratigraphic units in England
