= Poole Basin =

Coordinates: 50.7°N 1.9°W

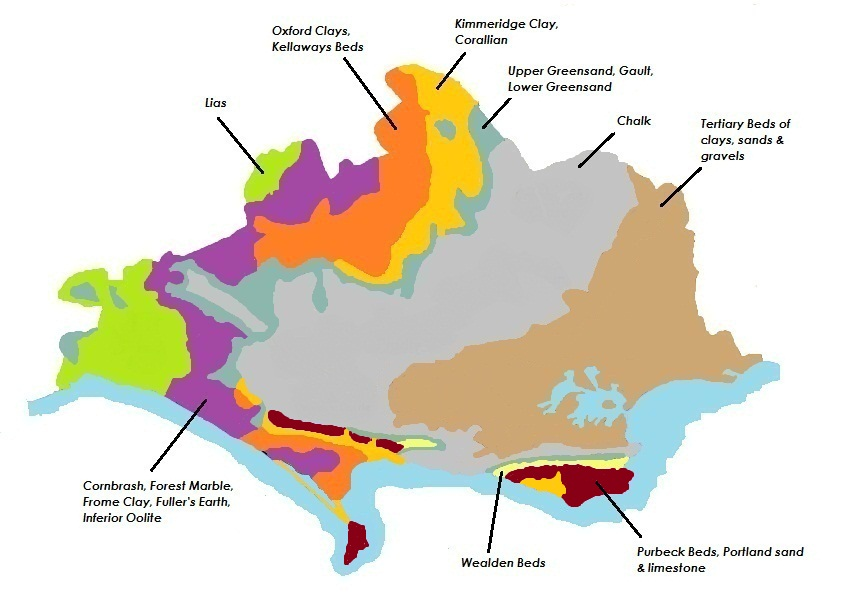
The Poole Basin coincides with the area of the "Tertiary Beds" (beige) in this geological map of Dorset

Poole Basin is a geological formation in England that forms the western part of the much larger Hampshire Basin from which it is separated by the River Avon.

== Geology ==
The rim and bed of the basin are formed by chalk, within which lie the Tertiary sands and clays underlying the Dorset Heaths. The most extensive deposits here are those of the Poole Formation or Bagshot Beds. At one time the whole area was almost all heathland lying on acidic soils. Between the chalk perimeter and the central heaths is a belt where the Reading Beds and London Clays surface, giving rise to richer, albeit still acidic, soils. Deposits of plateau and valley gravels overlie the sands of the Poole Formation, but their soils are likewise poor and acidic. Erosive forces have resulted in an undulating landscape with considerable local variation from narrow, steep-sided valleys and escarpments to areas of flat terrain. The highest point is Creech Barrow Hill (193 m), the highest Tertiary hill in England, capped with Eocene limestone.
