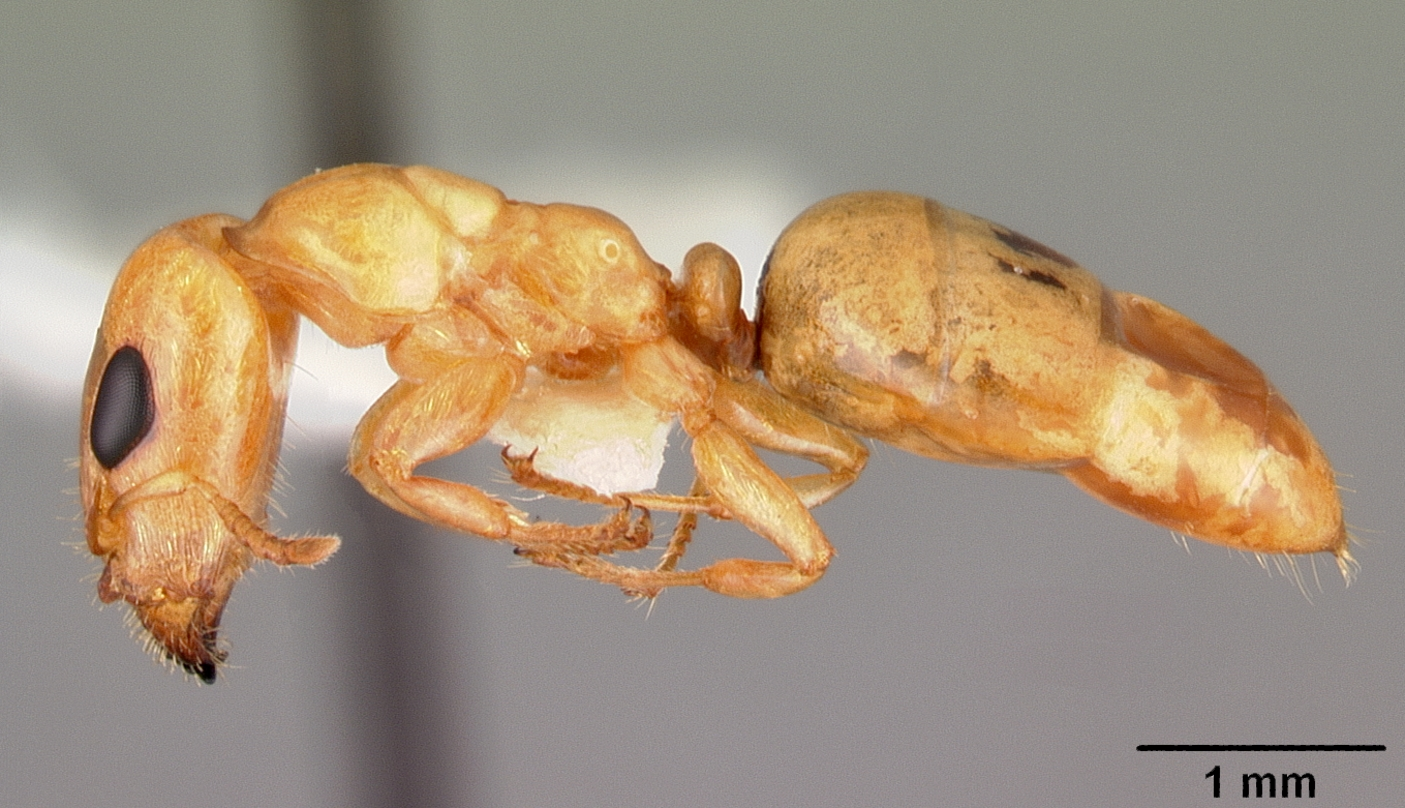
- Gesomyrmex howardi worker from China

Scientific classification
- Domain: Eukaryota
- Kingdom: Animalia
- Phylum: Arthropoda
- Class: Insecta
- Order: Hymenoptera
- Family: Formicidae
- Subfamily: Formicinae
- Tribe: Gesomyrmecini
- Genus: Gesomyrmex; Mayr, 1868

Type species
- †Gesomyrmex hoernesi Mayr, 1868

Synonyms
- Dimorphomyrmex André, 1892; Gaesomyrmex Dalla Torre, 1893

= Gesomyrmex =

Gesomyrmex Temporal range: Lutetian-Present

Genus of ants

Gesomyrmex is a genus of ants in the subfamily Formicinae. The genus contains six extant species, known from the Indomalayan realm, and nine fossil species. Of the extant species, four are known only from workers (G. chaperi, G. howardi, G. kalshoveni and G. spatulatus) and two only from females (G. luzonensis and G. tobiasi). The extinct species "G. expectans" and "Gesomyrmex miegi", formerly placed in the genus, were excluded by Dlussky et al.., 2009.

The living species are arboreal typically building nests in the twigs of trees.

== Species ==
- †Gesomyrmex bremii (Heer, 1849)
- †Gesomyrmex breviceps Dlussky, Wappler & Wedmann, 2009
- Gesomyrmex chaperi André, 1892
- †Gesomyrmex curiosus Dlussky, Wappler & Wedmann, 2009
- †Gesomyrmex flavescens Dlussky, Wappler & Wedmann, 2009
- †Gesomyrmex germanicus Dlussky, Wappler & Wedmann, 2009
- †Gesomyrmex hoernesi Mayr, 1868
- Gesomyrmex howardi Wheeler, 1921
- †Gesomyrmex incertus Dlussky, Rasnitsyn & Perfilieva, 2015
- Gesomyrmex kalshoveni Wheeler, 1929
- Gesomyrmex luzonensis (Wheeler, 1916)
- †Gesomyrmex macrops Dlussky, Rasnitsyn & Perfilieva, 2015
- †Gesomyrmex magnus Dlussky, Rasnitsyn & Perfilieva, 2015
- †Gesomyrmex pulcher Dlussky, Wappler & Wedmann, 2009
- Gesomyrmex spatulatus Cole, 1949
- Gesomyrmex tobiasi Dubovikov, 2004
