= Bracklesham Group =

Geologic formation in England

- Stratigraphic range: Eocene
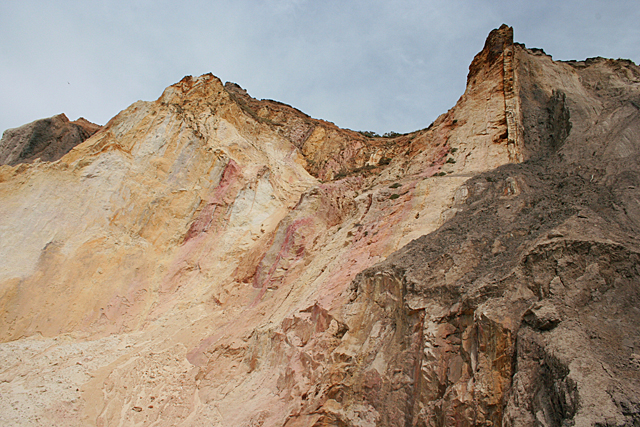
- Branksome Sand Formation at the top of the Bracklesham Group, made up of white, yellow, rose-coloured and crimson sands with laminated pipe clay. Alum Bay cliffs.
- Type: Group
- Sub-units: London Basin - Bagshot Formation, Windlesham Formation, Camberley Sand Formation; Hampshire Basin - Wittering Formation, Earnley Sand Formation, Marsh Farm Formation, Selsey Sand Formation, Poole Formation, Branksome Sand Formation, Boscombe Sand Formation
- Underlies: Barton Group
- Overlies: Thames Group
- Thickness: ~120 m Hampshire Basin, ~140 m London Basin

Lithology
- Primary: clay, silt & sand

Location
- Region: Hampshire Basin, London Basin, England
- Country: United Kingdom

Type section
- Named for: Bracklesham

The Bracklesham Group (formerly Bracklesham Beds), in geology, is a series of clays and marls, with sandy and lignitic beds, in the middle Eocene of the Hampshire Basin and London Basin of England.

The type section of the Bracklesham Group is the sea cliffs at Whitecliff Bay on the Isle of Wight, and it is also well developed on the mainland. The Group gets its name from a section at Bracklesham in Sussex. The thickness of the deposit is around 120 m. Fossil mollusca are abundant, and fossil fish are to be found, as well as Palaeophis, a sea-snake, and Puppigerus, a sea turtle. Nummulites and other foraminifera also occur.

The Bracklesham Group lies between the Barton Clay above and the Bournemouth Beds, Lower Bagshot, below. In the London Basin, these beds are represented only by thin sandy clays in the Middle Bagshot group. In the Paris Basin the "Calcaire grossier" lies upon the same geological horizon.
