= Headon Hill Formation =

Geological formation in England

- Stratigraphic range: Priabonian
- Type: Formation
- Unit of: Solent Group
- Underlies: Bembridge Limestone Formation
- Overlies: Becton Sand Formation
- Thickness: 75–90 m

Lithology
- Primary: clay, silt and sand
- Other: limestone, lignite

Location
- Region: England
- Country: United Kingdom
- Extent: Isle of Wight and South Hampshire

Type section
- Named for: Headon Hill
- Location: Isle of Wight and South Hampshire

The Headon Hill Formation is a geological formation found in the Isle of Wight and south Hampshire, England. It preserves fossils dating back to the Priabonian stage (uppermost Eocene).

== See also ==
- List of fossiliferous stratigraphic units in England
