= Bagshot Formation =

Series of Ypresian sands and clays in England

- Stratigraphic range: Ypresian
- Type: Geological formation
- Unit of: Bracklesham Group
- Sub-units: Swinley Clay Member
- Underlies: Windlesham Formation
- Overlies: London Clay Formation
- Thickness: up to 45 metres (150 ft)

Lithology
- Primary: Sand
- Other: Clay, Silt, Gravel

Location
- Region: Europe
- Country: United Kingdom
- Extent: London Basin

Type section
- Named for: Bagshot
- Location: Heathland, near Bagshot

In geology, the Bagshot Beds are a series of sands and clays of shallow-water origin, some being fresh-water, some marine. They belong to the upper Eocene formation of the London and Hampshire basins, in England and derive their name from Bagshot Heath in Surrey. They are also well developed in Hampshire, Berkshire and the Isle of Wight. The following divisions are generally accepted:

- Upper Bagshot Beds — Barton sand and Barton clay.
- Middle Bagshot Beds — Bracklesham Beds.
- Lower Bagshot Beds — Bournemouth Beds and Alum Bay Beds.

The lower division consists of pale-yellow, current-bedded sand and loam, with layers of pipeclay and occasional beds of flint pebbles. In the London basin, wherever the junction of the Bagshot beds with the London clay is exposed, it is clear that no sharp line can be drawn between these formations. The Lower Bagshot Beds may be observed at Brentwood, Billericay and High Beach in Essex; outliers, capping hills of London clay, occur at Hampstead, Highgate and Harrow. In Surrey, considerable tracts of London clay are covered by heath-bearing Lower Bagshot Beds, as at Weybridge, Aldershot, Woking etc. The Ramsdell clay, N.W. of Basingstoke, belongs to this formation. In the Isle of Wight, the lower division is well exposed at Alum Bay (200 m.) and White Cliff Bay (140 ft.). Here it consists of unfossiliferous sands (white, yellow, brown, crimson and every intermediate shade) and clays with layers of lignite and ferruginous sandstone. Similar beds are visible at Bournemouth and in the neighborhood of Poole, Wareham, Corfe Castle and Studland.

The leaf-bearing clays of Alum Bay and Bournemouth are well known and have yielded a large and interesting series of plant remains, including Eucalyptus, Caesalpinia, Populus, Platanus, Sequoia, Aralia, Polypodium, Osmunda, Nipadites and many others. The clays of this formation are of great value for pottery manufacture; they are extensively mined near Wareham and Corfe, whence they are shipped from Poole and are consequently known as 'Poole clays'. Alum was formerly obtained from the clays of Alum Bay; and the lignites have been used as fuel near Corfe and at Bovey. The Bracklesham Beds are sometimes classed with the overlying Barton clay as Middle Bagshot. In the London basin the Barton Beds are unknown. In Surrey and Berkshire, the Bracklesham Beds are from 20 to 50 ft. thick; in Alum Bay they are 100 ft., with beds of lignite in the lower portion; and about here they are sharply marked off from the Barton clay by a bed of conglomerate formed of flint pebbles. In Berkshire, the Bagshot Beds are variegated quartzose sands with grey to umber, or occasionally cabonaceous clay bands, with pebble beds sometimes present near the base. They are 30-36m (100-120 ft.) thick around Reading and near to Kintbury. The Bracklesham Beds in Berkshire are generally variegated glauconitic clays, loams, and subordinate sands. They are generally 12m (40 ft.) thick near Reading, with thin pebble beds sometimes present. This geology generally creates undulating, gently sloped land. The presence of glauconite in some of the soil's materials can provide adequate levels of potassium (Berkshire soils are generally deficient in potassium), but they are generally still lacking. The Upper Bagshot Beds, Barton sand and Barton clay, are from 140 to 200 ft. thick in the Isle of Wight. The Agglestone (or Haggerstone) rock and Puckstone rock, near Studland in Dorset are formed of large indurated masses of the Lower Bagshot beds that have resisted the weather; Creechbarrow near Corfe is another striking feature due to the same beds. Many of the sarsen stones or greywethers of S.E. England have been derived from Bagshot strata.
