= Bembridge Limestone Formation =

Geological unit of Late Eocene age

The Bembridge Limestone Formation is a geological unit of Late Eocene age (Priabonian to early Oligocene), located in the northern Isle of Wight, southern England. It lies within the Solent Group, stratigraphically above the Headon Hill Formation and below the Bouldnor Formation.

== Type locality and distribution ==
The formation's type section is found in the cliffs at the northern end of Whitecliff Bay, where about 9 meters of alternating limestone and marl beds are exposed. Additional coastal outcrops occur at Bembridge Ledges, Priory Bay, and Seagrove Bay. Inland, the formation is visible at Tapnell Farm Quarry and Binstead Quarry.

== Lithology and stratigraphy ==
The Bembridge Limestone Formation typically consists of three sedimentary cycles. Each begins with an erosional base, sometimes with intraformational conglomerates, followed by sequences of marl and marlstone, and capped by dense, micritic limestone. A notable middle unit contains “corbiculid beds” rich in bivalve fossils, representing a distinct clayey interval.

== Depositional environment and facies ==
The formation was deposited in a freshwater to brackish, marginal lacustrine and palustrine environment, subject to periodic subaerial exposure. Sedimentary features such as micritic textures, pedogenic overprinting, and laminated structures suggest frequent wetting and drying cycles in a nearshore continental setting.

Trace fossils, including Balanoglossites triadicus, indicate occasional marine incursions into the predominantly nonmarine environment. These ichnofossils support brief phases of brackish or tidal influence.

== Age and correlation ==
Magnetostratigraphic data from Whitecliff Bay show mostly reversed polarity (Chron C13r) with a short normal interval (Chron C13n) at the top. This dates the Bembridge Limestone Formation to approximately 34.0-33.9 million years ago, placing it near the Eocene-Oligocene boundary.

== Fossils and paleontology ==
The formation preserves freshwater and brackish mollusks, especially gastropods such as Galba and Planorbina. Shells are often replaced by calcite spar or preserved as molds. The fauna indicate low-diversity ecosystems typical of shallow, nonmarine conditions.

== Economic and historical significance ==
Limestone quarried from the Bembridge Formation, particularly at Binstead, has historically been used as a local building stone, sometimes referred to as “Binstead Stone.” It was used in structures in Southampton and Winchester. The porous, moldic texture left by dissolved gastropods gives the stone a distinctive appearance.
