= Denys Hill =

English cricketer

Personal information
- Full name: Denys Vivian Hill
- Born: 13 April 1896; Edmonton, Middlesex, England
- Died: 15 May 1971 (aged 75); Barton-on-Sea, Hampshire, England
- Nickname: Hooky
- Batting: Right-handed
- Bowling: Right-arm fast

Domestic team information
- Years: Team
- 1927–1929: Worcestershire
- 1929: MCC
- FC debut: 31 May 1922 Army v Cambridge University
- Last FC: 23 August 1929 MCC v Wales

Career statistics
Competition	First-class
Matches	42
Runs scored	469
Batting average	9.01
100s/50s	0/0
Top score	38
Balls bowled	6,367
Wickets	130
Bowling average	26.82
5 wickets in innings	6
10 wickets in match	0
Best bowling	6/59
Catches/stumpings	23/–
- Source: CricketArchive, 19 September 2007

Denys Vyvian Hill (13 April 1896 – 15 May 1971), nicknamed Hooky Hill, was an English first-class cricketer who played 42 matches in the 1920s. Most of these (28) were in county cricket for Worcestershire, but he also appeared at first-class level for the Gentlemen, Army, Free Foresters, North of England and Marylebone Cricket Club (MCC).

He made his debut for the Army at Fenner's, in a drawn match against Cambridge University, at the end of May 1922; he claimed the solitary wicket of Cambridge wicket-keeper Dar Lyon. Two further Army appearances that summer produced one more wicket in each of his four bowling innings, while a single match for Free Foresters in 1923 brought him 2-65; he did not score more than 5 in any of his six visits to the crease during those two seasons.

Hill was then out of the first-class game for several years, returning in 1926 for one unproductive match (no wickets; no runs) for the Army against Oxford University. The main part of his cricketing career commenced the next year, when he began to play for Worcestershire. His County Championship debut, versus Kent in early May 1927, brought him a first-innings haul of 4–139, though Worcestershire lost the game by an innings. A fortnight later he recorded a career-best return of 6–59 against Northamptonshire, hitting 31 from number eleven for good measure, though again his county were defeated.

He ended 1927 with 34 first-class wickets at 26.88, but it was to be 1928 when he achieved his greatest success. Making 23 first-class appearances, by some distance his most of any season, Hill took 73 wickets at 27.23 and claimed five or more in an innings on four occasions. In September he was selected for the Gentlemen against the Players at Dean Park, Bournemouth, and picked up seven wickets in the match, his second-innings 12* also contributing to a nail-biting one-wicket win. Immediately afterwards he played for North of England v South of England at the same venue, and again claimed seven victims in the game.

After 1928, Hill was to play only once more for Worcestershire, against the touring South Africans at Worcester in early May 1929. However, he did turn out twice more for MCC and once for the Army, as well as making a minor appearance for MCC against Ireland; all four of these games were at Lord's. His final first-class match was MCC v Wales in late August 1929, in which he took three wickets; his final victim was Harry Symonds. He then went to Malaya and in 1930 played for the Straits Settlements against the Federated Malay States at Kuala Lumpur.

During the Second World War, he was a Japanese prisoner of war and had the rank of lieutenant-colonel.
