= Aeschnophlebia andreasi =

Scientific classification
- Kingdom: Animalia
- Phylum: Arthropoda
- Clade: Pancrustacea
- Class: Insecta
- Order: Odonata
- Infraorder: Anisoptera
- Family: Aeshnidae
- Genus: Aeschnophlebia
- Species: †A. andreasi

Binomial name
- †Aeschnophlebia andreasi Nel et al., 2005

Extinct species of dragonfly

Aeschnophlebia andreasi is an extinct dragonfly in the genus Aeschnophlebia.

== Habitat ==
Fossilized specimens have been found in what is now modern day United Kingdom. The fossils come from the Eocene epoch.
