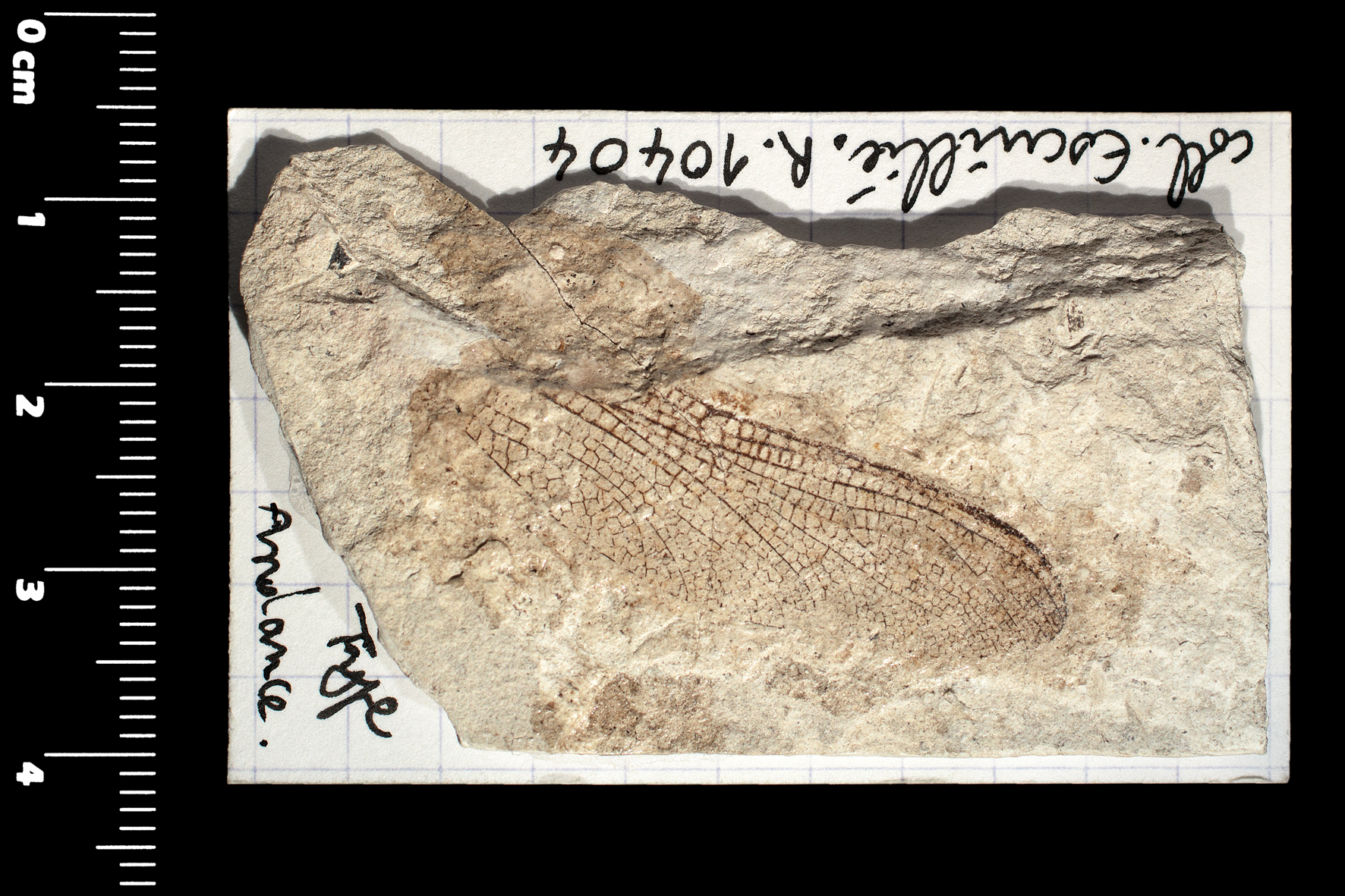
- Aeschnophlebia miocenica holotype

Scientific classification
- Kingdom: Animalia
- Phylum: Arthropoda
- Clade: Pancrustacea
- Class: Insecta
- Order: Odonata
- Infraorder: Anisoptera
- Family: Aeshnidae
- Genus: Aeschnophlebia
- Species: †A. miocenica

Binomial name
- †Aeschnophlebia miocenica Nel & Escuillé, 1994

= Aeschnophlebia miocenica =

Extinct species of dragonfly

Aeschnophlebia miocenica is an extinct dragonfly in the genus Aeschnophlebia.

== Habitat ==
Specimens have been found in what is now modern day France. They would have been there in the Miocene Epoch.
