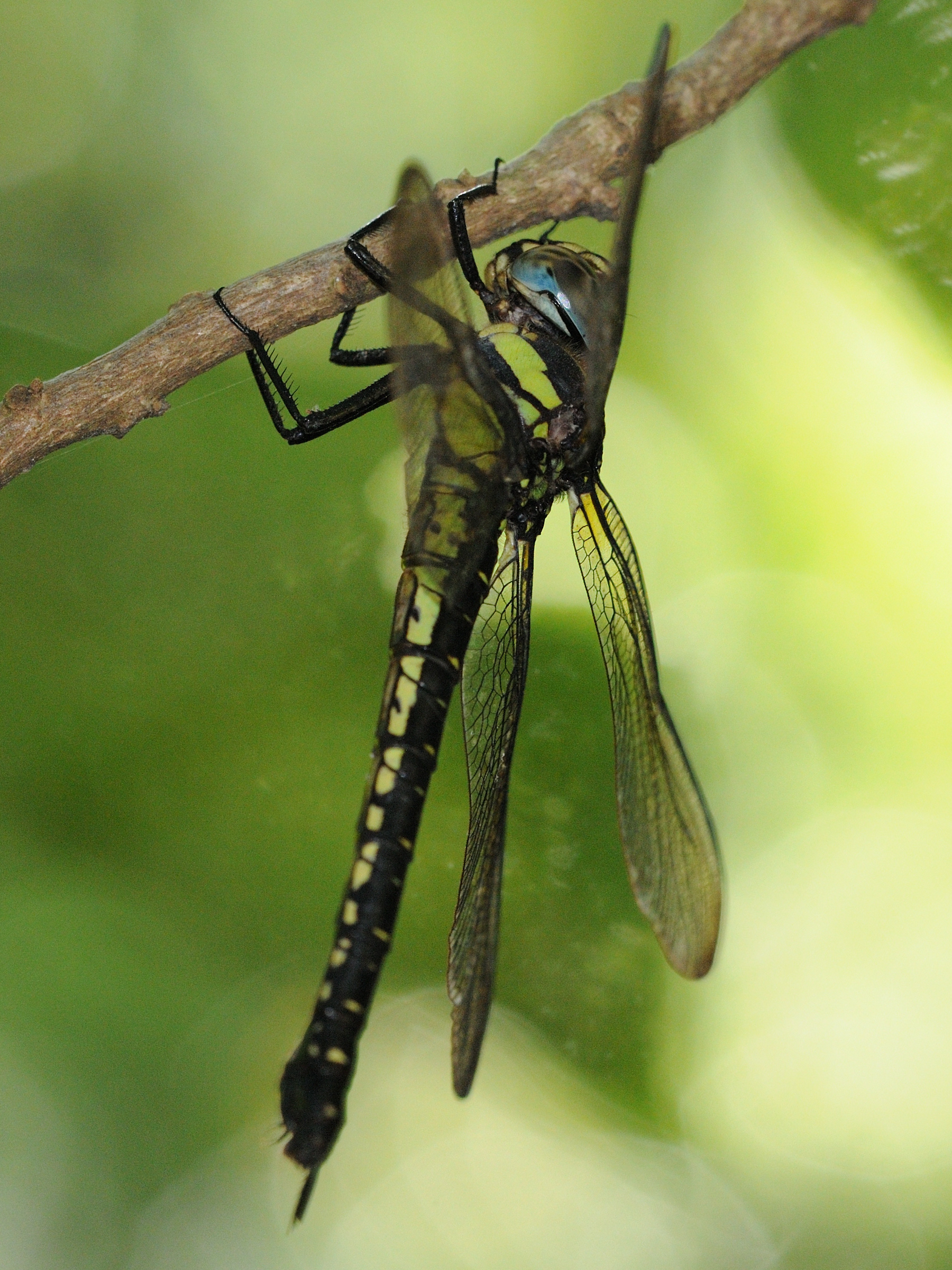
- Female Aeschnophlebia anisoptera

Scientific classification
- Kingdom: Animalia
- Phylum: Arthropoda
- Clade: Pancrustacea
- Class: Insecta
- Order: Odonata
- Infraorder: Anisoptera
- Family: Aeshnidae
- Genus: Aeschnophlebia; Selys, 1883

= Aeschnophlebia =

Genus of dragonflies

Aeschnophlebia is a genus of dragonflies in the family Aeshnidae.

== Species ==
The following species are assigned to this genus:

- †Aeschnophlebia andreasi Nel et al., 2005
- Aeschnophlebia anisoptera Selys, 1883
- Aeschnophlebia asahinai Karube, 2011
- Aeschnophlebia bachmaensis Karube, 2002
- Aeschnophlebia longistigma Selys, 1883
- †Aeschnophlebia miocenica Nel & Escuillé, 1994
- Aeschnophlebia owadai Karube, 2002
- Aeschnophlebia viridis Karube, 2004

== Etymology ==
Aeschnophlebia can be split into two Greek words, Aeschno- and -phlebia. The exact origins and meaning of aeschno- has been greatly debated, but it can be boiled down to being derived from a Greek word that means spear. -phlebia comes from a Greek word meaning vein. Together the meaning could be taken as spear-vein.
