= Ernest St. John Burton =

English painter

Ernest St. John Burton (December 1875 – 18 March 1962) F.R.S.A, F.L.S, F.G.S, F.Z.S, was a talented artist, composer, musician, author, and geologist.

== Life and work ==
Ernest St. John Burton was born in Parkstone, Dorset and later lived in Bournemouth before moving to Barton in 1934. He came from a very talented family – his brother and sister were both artists of some note, while his father T. Arthur Burton was a composer, many of whose works were performed about the 20th century in Bournemouth " Symphony and Classical Concerts" by Sir Dan Godfrey's, municipal orchestra.

Ernest who had received his musical education at Brussels Conservatoire became a member of the municipal orchestra, playing both the Piano and the violin, like his father; he too was a composer, specialising in music for these two instruments. He was also the Author of the book, The History and Evolution of the Violin published in 1936. Burton was a gifted artist in Oils, Water Colour and pastel, and many fine examples of his work adorned the walls of his home at Barton. He specialised in Landscapes, particularly of the south and West Country, and had works exhibited in the Paris Salon, the Royal Institute of Water Colour Painters and the Royal West of England Academy. Other examples of his work can be seen in the Russell Cotes Art Gallery, Bournemouth.

Burton had a great reputation as a geologist and his knowledge of the fossils in the Eocene Beds of Barton Cliffs was probably unsurpassed, his collection of fossils from these beds has been bequeathed to the Natural History Museum in London and has been accepted as a valuable addition to their collections. For some 40 years he was a member of the geological section of the Bournemouth Natural Science Society and frequently conducted parties of geologists on investigations of the Barton beds. He also made a geological survey in the Southampton docks area, in collaboration with fellow geologists and a collection of the fossils they discovered is now in the Tudor House Museum.

Burton contributed a number of papers on the subject of geology, notably a treatise on The Origin of Lulworth Cove, Dorsetshire in 1937 and a survey of the fossil remains in the Barton beds and others entitled The Horizons of The Bryzoa (polyzoa) in the upper Eocene beds of Hampshire in 1929.

== Private life ==
Burton had one son with his first wife, the latter died in 1918. He later married Beatrice.

Ernest St John Burton died at Douglas house, in Southbourne on Sunday 18 March 1962 at the age of 87.
