= Bouldnor Formation =

- Stratigraphic range: Priabonian-Rupelian; ~38–28 Ma
- Type: Geological formation
- Unit of: Solent Group
- Sub-units: Bembridge Marls Member, Hamstead Member, Cranmore Member
- Underlies: Alluvium
- Overlies: Bembridge Limestone
- Thickness: >50 m (160 ft)

Lithology
- Primary: Clay

Location
- Region: England
- Country: United Kingdom

The Bouldnor Formation is a geological formation in the Hampshire Basin of southern England. It is the youngest formation of the Solent Group and was deposited during the uppermost Eocene and lower Oligocene.

== Stratotype and occurrence ==
Geological map of the Isle of Wight – the Bouldnor Formation includes the Bembridge Marls and Hamstead Beds on this map.

The Bouldnor Formation was named after Bouldnor, a small hamlet east of Yarmouth, Isle of Wight. The formation is exposed along Bouldnor Cliff between Yarmouth and Hamstead occupying the core of the east-southeast-striking Bouldnor Syncline.

Yet the stratotype of the formation is found at Whitecliff Bay on the east side of the Isle of Wight.

== History ==
The Bouldnor Formation was scientifically established 1985 by A. Insole and B. Daly, who also defined its members. The paleogene strata on the Isle of Wight had already been described in 1853 by Edward Forbes. Forbes was followed in 1921 by H.J.O. White, a geologist from the Geological Survey.

== Stratigraphy ==
The Bouldnor-Formation is the topmost formation of the Solent Group before the sea withdrew completely from the Hampshire Basin. The thickness of the formation can vary between 45 and 115 metres. After a long hiatus Pleistocene and Holocene sediments covered the formation discordantly. The Bouldnor Formation lies concordantly on desiccation cracks of the upper Bembridge Limestone (Bembridge Limestone Formation), a freshwater deposit.

The formation consists mainly of clays with some intercalated sands which were sedimented along a coastal plain in lagoonal and lacustrine/palustrine facies judging by the enclosed freshwater, brackish and marine biota. Marine conditions were only rarely achieved, examples being the Bembridge Oyster Bed, the Nematura Bed and sections of the upper Cranmore Member.

A very diversified and well preserved biota can be found within the Bouldnor Formation comprising molluscs, vertebrates (especially mammals), charophytes and vascular plants. The nonmarine layers are characterized by gastropods like Australorbis, Lymnaea/Galba and Viviparus and ostracods like Gandona, Cypridopsis and Moenocypris. In the middle section (i.e. in the Hamstead Member) the effects of the Grande Coupure on the biota are clearly noticeable and follow immediately after the negative oxygen excursion Oi-1 at the beginning of the Oligocene.

Stratigraphically the Bouldnor Formation is subdivided into three members (from top to bottom):

- Cranmore Member
- Hamstead Member
- Bembridge Marls Member

=== Bembridge Marls Member ===
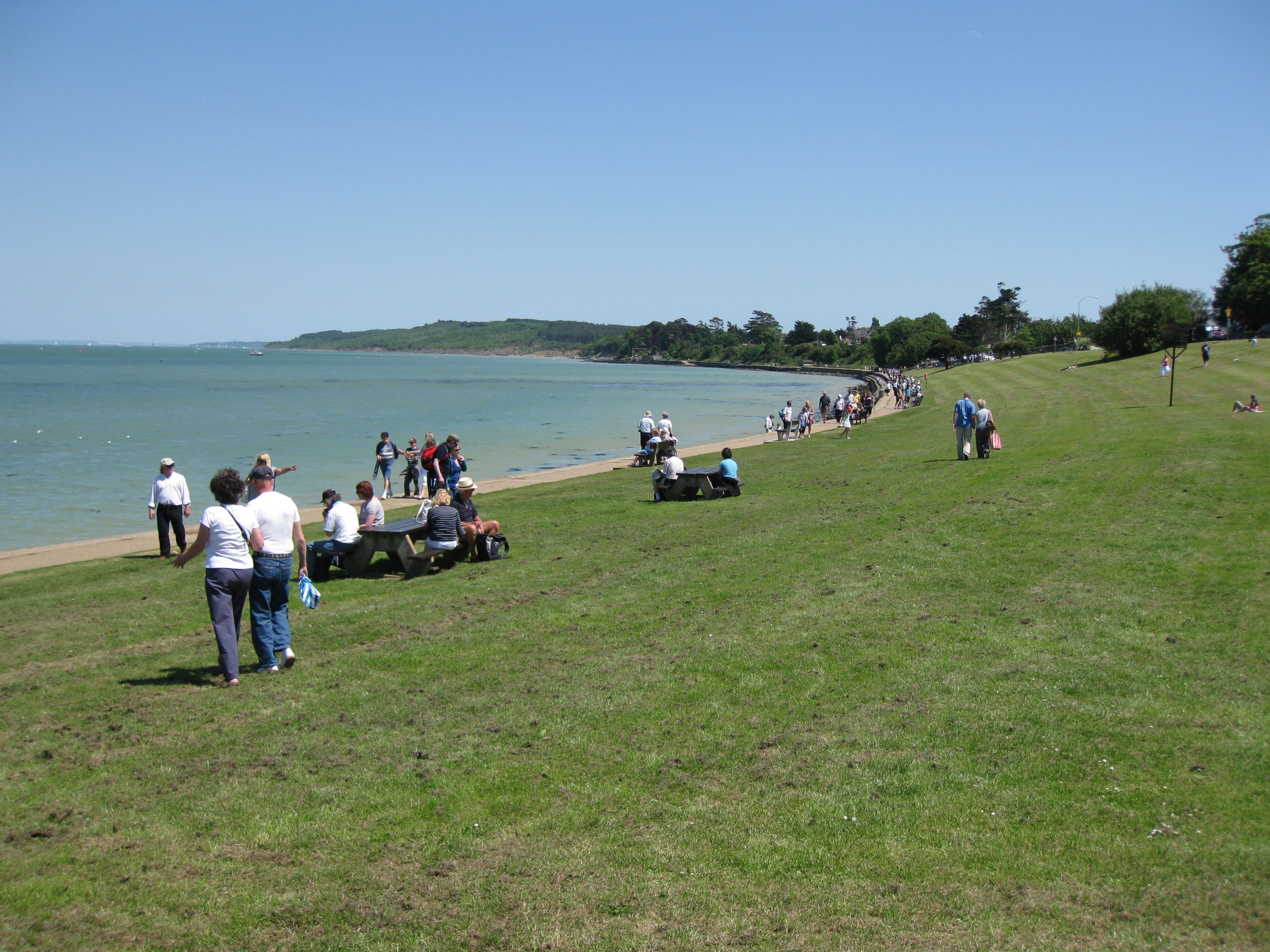
Yarmouth Common with Bouldnor Cliffs in the background

The basal, 20 to 23 metres, exceptionally-35 metres-thick Bembridge Marls Member is mainly composed of blueish to greenish-gray clays and marls. Interlaced are several mollusc-bearing horizons. The clays show a rhythmical, varve-like layering. The member overlies the summital mudcracks of the Bembridge Limestone Formation without any discontinuity. It correlates magnetostratigraphically with the upper part of chron C 13r and biostratigraphically with the calcareous nannoplanktonzone NP21. The member therefore belongs to the upper Priabonian and has an absolute age of 34.0 to 33.75 million years BP.

The Bembridge Marls Member was mainly sedimented in fresh or brackish water as indicated by cirripedia and gastropods like Terebia. The lower section of the member is of estuarine origin, whereas the upper section was laid down by rivers inhabited by prosobranchs like Viviparus. Relatively short-lived marine inraids are recognizable in horizons like the Bembridge Oyster Bed 1.5 metres above the base and a limestone band with bivalves like Corbicula and Nucula. Amongst the fish Amia sp. and other amiids have been found

The fossil contents of the Bembridge Marls Member are quite varied, with freshwater species like Lymnaea and Unio and marine taxa like Melanopsis, Meretrix and Ostrea. The Bembridge Insect Bed at the base of the member is a marly sand layer with a very rich insect fauna and many leaves. This layer constitutes a lagerstätte with very good preservation. Amongst the finds are coleoptera, diptera, hymenoptera and arthropods as for instance Aeschnophlebia andeasi, Oligoaeschna anglica and Vectaraneus yulei. Plant remains within the member include palm seeds and the fern Acrostichum.

Amongst the mammals are Anoplotherium latipes, Bransatoglis bahloi, Choeropotamus parisiensis, Ectropomys exiguus, Gesneropithex sp., Glamys devoogdi, Haplomeryx zitteli, Heterohyus, Microchoerus edwardsi, Palaeotherium medium, Paroxacron sp., Peratherium, Plagiolophus major, Plagiolophus minor, Saturninia gracilis, Suevosciurus ehingensis, Tarnomys schmidtkittleri, Theridomys bonduelli and Treposciurus.

=== Hamstead Member ===
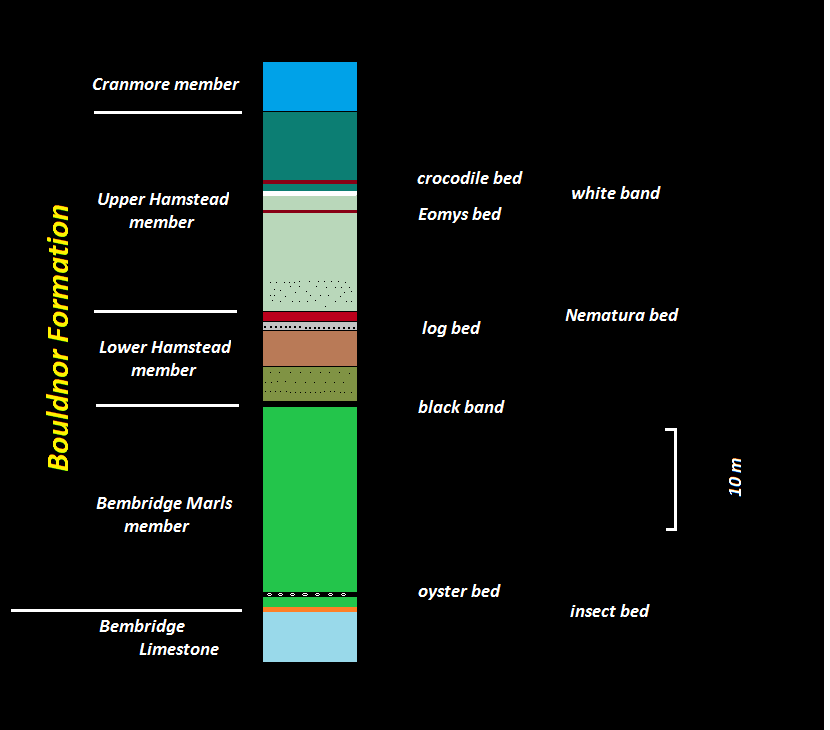
Stratigraphic section of the Bouldnor Formation

The 20 to 70 meter thick Hamstead Member is divided in two by the Nematura bed (rich in Nematura parvula).

==== Lower Hamstead Member ====
The 10-meter-thick Lower Hamstead Member follows directly upon the Bembridge Marls Member with a 40-centimetre-thick olive to black seam, the Black Band. This layer is very rich in organic matter and was deposited under freshwater conditions. At its base it carries calcrete nodules and rootlets. The Black Band is overlain by roughly 4 metres of a greenish-greyish clay-silt interlayering. This changes to 3 metres of blue to brown, finely laminated clays including some shelly horizons. These clays are capped by a 1-metre-thick, blueish-greyish, clayey sand layer with ball-and-pillow-structure, contorted bedding and convolute bedding indicating dewatering of the sediment during diagenesis. This gravitationally unstable bed is known as the log bed for its up to 5-metre-long tree trunks. The log bed is clearly a freshwater deposit as it contains besides the tree trunks plenty of washed-up seeds of the genera Potamogeton and Stratiodes, and also the leaves of monocotyledon and dicotyledon plants. Its faunal remains attest the last pre-Grande Coupure assemblage (MP20).

After a distinct hiatus follows unconformably the Nematura bed which closes the Lower Hamstead Member. This bed is almost 1 meter thick and is characterized by chocolate-brown ripple marks enclosed in alternating clays and sands. It attests brackish conditions with a lot of reworked wood debris. Besides molluscs like Nematura (now Stenothyra) and Polymesoda there are also marine dinoflagellates and the ostracode Hemicyprideis. Within the basal shell layer traces of an eroded soil horizon (paleosoil) were found. The hiatus underneath is estimated to have lasted 350.000 years.

The following mammal taxa were found in the Lower Hamstead Member:

Amphidozotherium cayluxi, Amphiperaterium exile, Anoplotherium latipes, Bransatoglis planus, Butselia biveri, Cryptopithecus, Eotalpa anglica, Glamys fordi, Palaeotherium curtum, Palaeotherium muehlbergi, Paradoxonycteris tobieni, Pseudoltinomys cuvieri, Ronzotherium sp., Stehlinia minor, Suevosciurus ehingensis, Suevosciurus fraasi, Theridomys bonduelli and Xiphodon gracilis.

Amongst plants conifers start appearing, an example being Quasisequoia couttsiae and the pollen Inaperturopollenites magnus.

==== Upper Hamstead Member ====
The Upper Hamstead Member can reach a thickness of 60 meters. It starts with a 3-meter thick interlayering of greenish-greyish clay and silt bearing decalcified Polymesoda shells. Roughly 10 metres above the base follows the Eomys bed and immediately above it the White Band also containing Polymesoda shells. After the Crocodile bed the member ends with 8 meters of turquoise, plastic clays with orange-red freckles. Intercalated are occasional brown, slickensided, laminated clays and some shell horizons. Worth mentioning is also the White lily bed in the upper third of the Upper Hamstead Member.

Mammal remains were also found in the Upper Hamstead Member. They belong to the following species:

Amphicynodon sp., Amphiperatherium exile, Amphiperaterium minutum, Asteneofiber, Atavocricetodon atavus, Bothriodon velaunus, Butseloglis micio, Cryptopithecus, Elomeryx porcinus, Entelodon magnus, Eomys, Glamys fordi, Hyaenodon dubius, Isoptychus margaritae, Leptadapis sp., Myxomygale antiqua, Paradoxonycteris tobieni, Pecora, Peratherium perriense, Pseudoltinomys gaillardi, Ronzotherium romani, Stehlinia gracilis, Tapirulus hyracinus and Tetracus.

Chronologically the Hamstead Member starts at the Priabonian/Rupelian boundary and reaches into the upper Rupelian. It comprises the chrons C 13n and the lower part of C 12r. In absolute age it covers the time span 33.75 to 32.5 million years BP.

=== Cranmore Member ===
The Cranmore Member on top of the Bouldnor Formation is merely 5 to 9 meters thick and consists mainly of blueish-greenish clays. It starts off as a brackish facies (Cerithium beds with Cerithium) but changes to marine in the Corbula beds (with Corbula pisum and Corbula vectensis). The marine character is also underlined by the gastropods Hydrobia sp., Pusillina turbinata, Sandbergeria vectiana, Strebloceras cornuides, Syrnola sp. and Teinostoma decussatum. Also present are Viviparus lentus shells. The Cranmore Member belongs biostratigraphically to the calcareous nannofossil biozone NP23. The sedimentation stopped at the end of the member and the sea withdrew completely from the Hampshire Basin.

== Sequence stratigraphy ==
The Bouldnor-Formation consists of two second-order sequences, the sequence boundary (SB) being situated right underneath the Nematura bed. The first sequence already started at the base of the Bembridge Limestone Formation. The marine intervals within the Bouldnor Formation are interpreted as sea level highstands. The log bed was formed during retreating sea levels and are part of a falling stage systems tract (FSST). It is plausible that this fall in sea level correlates with the onset of glaciation in Antarctica at the beginning of the Oligocene.

The Eocene/Oligocene boundary most likely is situated below the sequence boundary in the Lower Hamstead Member or high in the upper Bembridge Marls Member.

Remark: This interpretation proposed by Hooker et al. (2009) is not accepted by all geologists. Gale et al. (2006) for instance place the sequence boundary much lower in the Bembridge Limestone Formation and also further subdivide the lower sequence into three sequences.

== Grande Coupure ==
The Grande Coupure within the Bouldnor Formation can be characterized by the enclosed biota as follows:

In the Upper Hamstead Member 16 new taxa appear for the first time and 11 disappear. Within the pre-Grand Coupure Lower Hamstead Member only 5 new appearances were registered, mainly European rodents like Butselia. Amongst the 16 newcomers at the Grande Coupure are 10 immigrant species from Asia. Noticeable is also a concurrent general reduction in diversity. Within the Bembridge Limestone Formation 47 taxa were present, whereas within the Upper Hamstead Member the number of species had reduced to 28. One should notice though that the minimum in diversity with 20 taxa was already reached within the Lower Hamstead Member. This argues for a much more drawn out process in the reduction of species setting in already before the Grande Coupure. The Grande Coupure itself is distinguished by the fairly rapid replacement of endemic species with immigrants from Asia.
