= Barton Beds =

Geologic formation of southern England

Barton Group
- Stratigraphic range: Lutetian to Priabonian (Eocene)
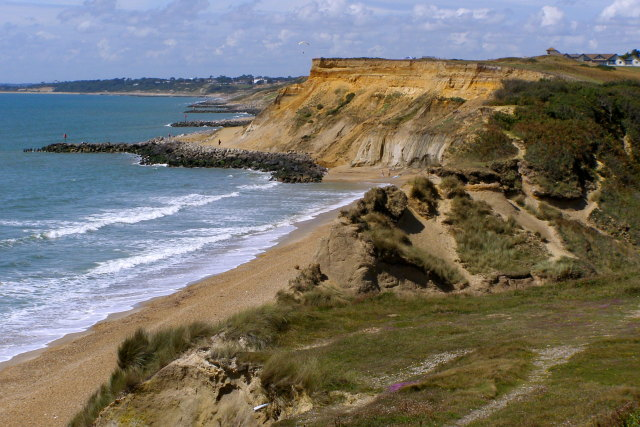
- Cliffs at Barton-on-Sea
- Type: Group
- Sub-units: Barton Clay, Chama Sand, Becton Sand & Belton Sand Formations
- Underlies: Headon Formation
- Overlies: Selsey Sand Formation, Bracklesham Group
- Thickness: c. 175 m

Lithology
- Primary: claystone
- Other: sandstone, siltstone

Location
- Country: England
- Extent: Hampshire, Isle of Wight

Type section
- Named for: Barton-on-Sea

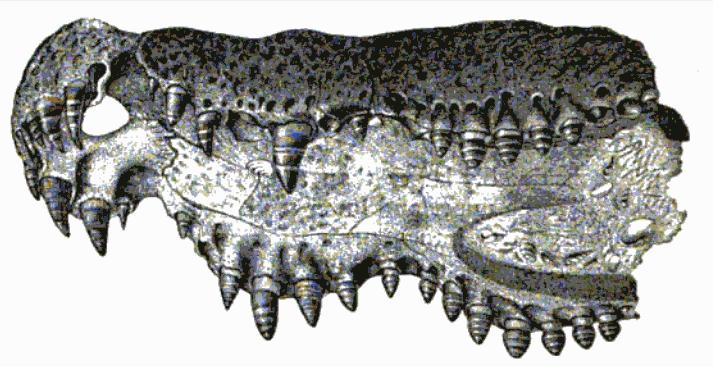
Cranium of Diplocynodon hantoniensis

Barton Beds (now the Barton Group) is the name given to a series of grey and brown clays, with layers of sand, of Upper Eocene age (around 40 million years old), which are found in the Hampshire Basin of southern England. They are particularly well exposed in the cliffs at Barton-on-Sea, which is the type locality for the Barton Beds, and lends its name to the Bartonian age of the Eocene epoch. The clay is abundant in fossils, especially molluscs.

The beds are found in the Hampshire Basin, and are well exposed in the cliffs of Barton, Hordle, and on the Isle of Wight. The cliffs at Barton are the world type locality for the Barton Beds. The beds consist of grey, greenish and brown clays with bands of sand and have long been well known for the abundance and excellent preservation of their fossils. More than 500 species have been recorded, of which, over half are molluscs, including numerous turret shells and lamellibranchs. Sharks teeth are common, and the beds have yielded remains of corals, fishes, mammals, reptiles, and birds. Plant fossils are also abundant. In the 1840s fossils were found in the "crocodile bed" at Hordle cliff, which belonged to an extinct species of alligator, which was subsequently named Diplocynodon hantoniensis, after the county of Hampshire (Hantonia being a Latinization based on the Anglo-Saxon name Hantescire). Above the highly fossiliferous Barton Clay, there is a sandy series with few fossils; these are the Headon Hill or Barton Sands. Today, the Barton Beds are rather poorly exposed in many sections due to coastal protection works.

The Barton Beds are of Upper Eocene age, and the area was covered with an inland sea, and the temperature was higher than at the present day. The term "Bartonian" was introduced by Karl Mayer-Eymar in 1857 for the continental equivalents of the series.
