= Barton on Sea =

Village in Hampshire, England

Coordinates: 50.7428°N 1.6552°W

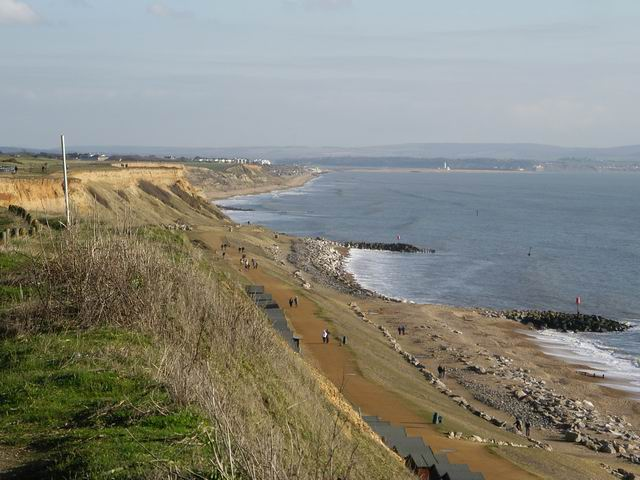
- Cliffs at Barton on Sea

- Location within Hampshire
- Population: 5,454 (2011 census: Barton on Sea ward)
- OS grid reference: SZ244937
- Civil parish: New Milton
- District: New Forest
- Shire county: Hampshire
- Region: South East
- Country: England
- Sovereign state: United Kingdom
- Post town: New Milton
- Postcode district: BH25 7
- Dialling code: 01425
- Police: Hampshire and Isle of Wight
- Fire: Hampshire and Isle of Wight
- Ambulance: South Central
- UK Parliament: New Forest West

Barton on Sea (often hyphenated as Barton-on-Sea) is a cliff-top village in the civil parish of New Milton, in the New Forest district, in Hampshire, England close to the town of New Milton to the north. As a settlement, Barton has a history dating back to Anglo-Saxon times. Barton is notable for the many fossils to be found in the Barton geological beds in the cliffs, as well as for the significant sea defences built to guard the cliffs against coastal erosion. Barton on Sea is a very popular retirement location. Approximately 36% of the population is retired. The population of Barton in the 2001 census was 6,849.

== History ==
The area of Barton has been populated since prehistoric times. A number of Bronze Age funerary urns were uncovered in Barton during the early 20th century, although most of them have been lost or destroyed. While Barton is a common English place-name, the etymology of Barton-on-Sea is unique. It means Beorma's Farm, and appears twice in the Domesday Book, as Bermintune and as Burmintune. Roger de Montgomerie, 1st Earl of Shrewsbury, and friend of William the Conqueror, held both Barton manors in 1086.

A manor is mentioned in 1559, when John Dowce died in possession of it. William Juniper acquired it soon after, and at his death it was described as the capital farm called "Barmeton". In 1654, Richard Stephens, lord of Winkton Manor, is said to have owned the "site of the manor" of Barton. It remained in the Stephens family until 1733, when Richard Stephens sold it to Thomas Le Marchant of the Inner Temple. In 1771 John Le Marchant of Guernsey conveyed "the scite of the manor of Barton, etc.," to Edward Dampier of Corfe Castle, in whose family it remained (the last holder having taken the name of Crossley) until 1903. As late as the 1880s, Barton largely consisted of two farm estates, but in the 1890s, both farms were auctioned and the estates were broken up. Subsequent land sales in the period 1904-1907 allowed the full development of the village as it appears today. In 1897 the first golf course was built at Barton along the cliff top, although the modern golf course at the east end of Barton dates from 1922.

A distinctive row of Coast Guard cottages is to be found in Barton Lane; these were built at the end of the nineteenth century by the government of the day to house armed guards to try to stop the smuggling rife at the time. The Barton on Sea and Mudeford coastline was renowned for smuggling activity with many of the offshore seaways and routes to shore being named after well known local smuggling families.

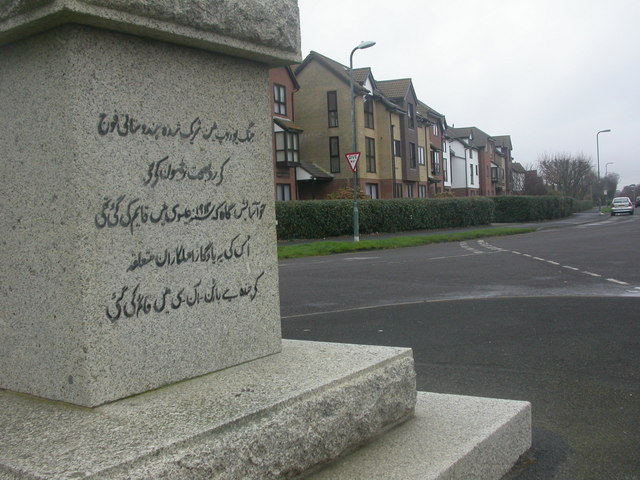
World War I Obelisk with an Urdu inscription

In the First World War Barton was the site of a convalescent home for Indian service men, and this is commemorated by an obelisk in the village which was erected in 1917. In 1927, a maternity hospital known as the Grove Maternity Hospital where many local people were born was opened; it closed in 1988. During World War II, the sea front at Barton was made a restricted area and metal defences including a pillbox were built, in anticipation of a German invasion.

The footballers Russell Perrett, Jamie Redknapp, and Neil Moss, were all born in Barton on Sea. Famous residents of Barton have included composer and author Ernest St. John Burton, the novelist Beatrice Harraden; the cricketer Denys Hill; and the conductor Harry Norris. George Campbell Wheeler who served in the British Indian Army during World War I and was awarded the Victoria Cross also lived here. The GCHQ whistleblower and intelligence agency officer, Jock Kane, lived in Barton in the 1980s, where he worked as a milkman and school bus driver.

At the east end of Barton was Becton Farm, where the famous showjumper Marion Coakes lived. Her horse, Stroller, is the only pony to have competed at the Olympic Games in Show Jumping, winning an individual silver medal in the 1968 Summer Olympics. The pony was buried at the farm. The farm was later bought by the Barton on Sea Golf Club, and Stroller now lies underneath the golf course with a plaque over the grave.

== Geography ==
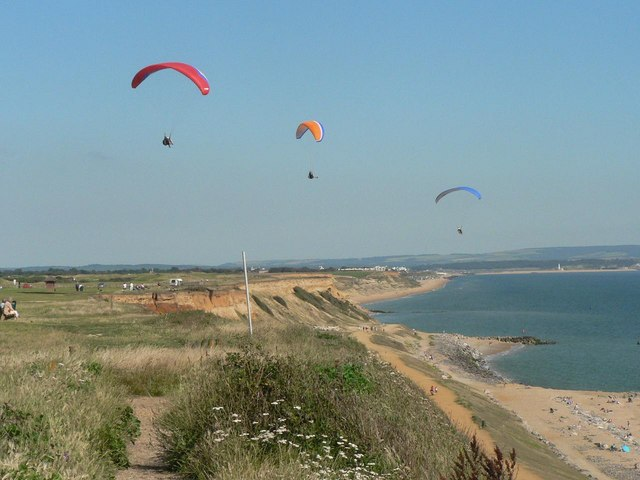
Paragliders at Barton cliffs

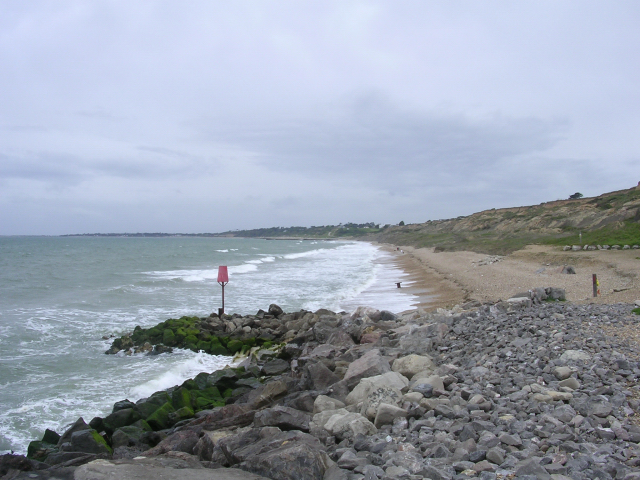
Sea defences at Barton on Sea

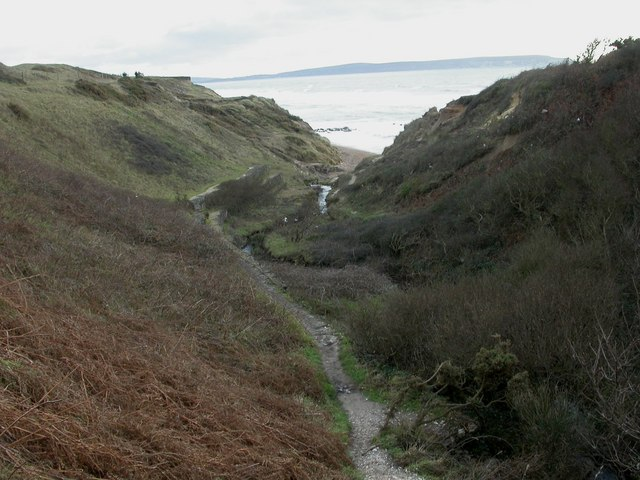
Becton Bunny

The coast at Barton on Sea is particularly well known for its geological content, being home to many fossils in the Barton geological beds. The Barton Beds may give their name to the Bartonian stage of the Eocene Epoch of geological time.

The beach is separated from the village by a 34-metre-high cliff, although there are connecting paths from the village. A cliff-top path runs between Barton and the village of Milford on Sea; the Solent Way stretches to Emsworth, on the West Sussex border. Barton is also well known for the fact that it was the first place in England to try out rock groynes. The cliffs are frequently used for paragliding. At the eastern end of the village is the Barton On Sea Golf Club, which is notable for comprising three loops of nine holes.

Barton on Sea has had for many years a problem with coastal erosion. In the past, the cliffs have eroded away at a rate of up to 1 metre a year, and several buildings have been lost. In the early 1900s the grassy promenade at the top of the cliffs was 100 metres wide, today it is around 20 metres at its widest points. The erosion was encouraged by the sea-defences added to the west at Bournemouth, thus starving Barton of the sediment needed for protecting its cliffs. Some coastal protection measures at Barton were installed in the late 1930s but fell into disrepair during World War II. In 1964 a series of timber groynes and a cliff drainage system was installed along 300m of the sea-front. This was followed in 1965-8 by a timber revetment backed by large rocks; an extension to the drainage system; and some rock groynes. Later improvements have consisted of replacing the timber groynes with rock groynes; and replacing the timber revetment with a rock structure of dark grey limestone boulders to protect the toe of the cliff. Today's cliff slip problems are largely due to inland water seepage. There have been recent experiments with vegetation defences (planting shrubs, plants and trees on the cliff face) to prevent rotational cliff slump, and therefore slowing the retreat of the cliff towards land which is in use.

To the west of Barton is Naish Farm, now a holiday park, which was once a farm estate with a history dating back to the 14th century. To the west of that is Chewton, notable for the chine called Chewton Bunny running down to the sea. To the east of Barton is Becton, once a farm with a history dating back to the Domesday book – the Saxon name means "Becca's farm" – now a golf course. Another chine called Becton Bunny can be found here, but it has become much reduced by coastal erosion. To the east of that are the farmlands of Taddiford ("Toad ford").
