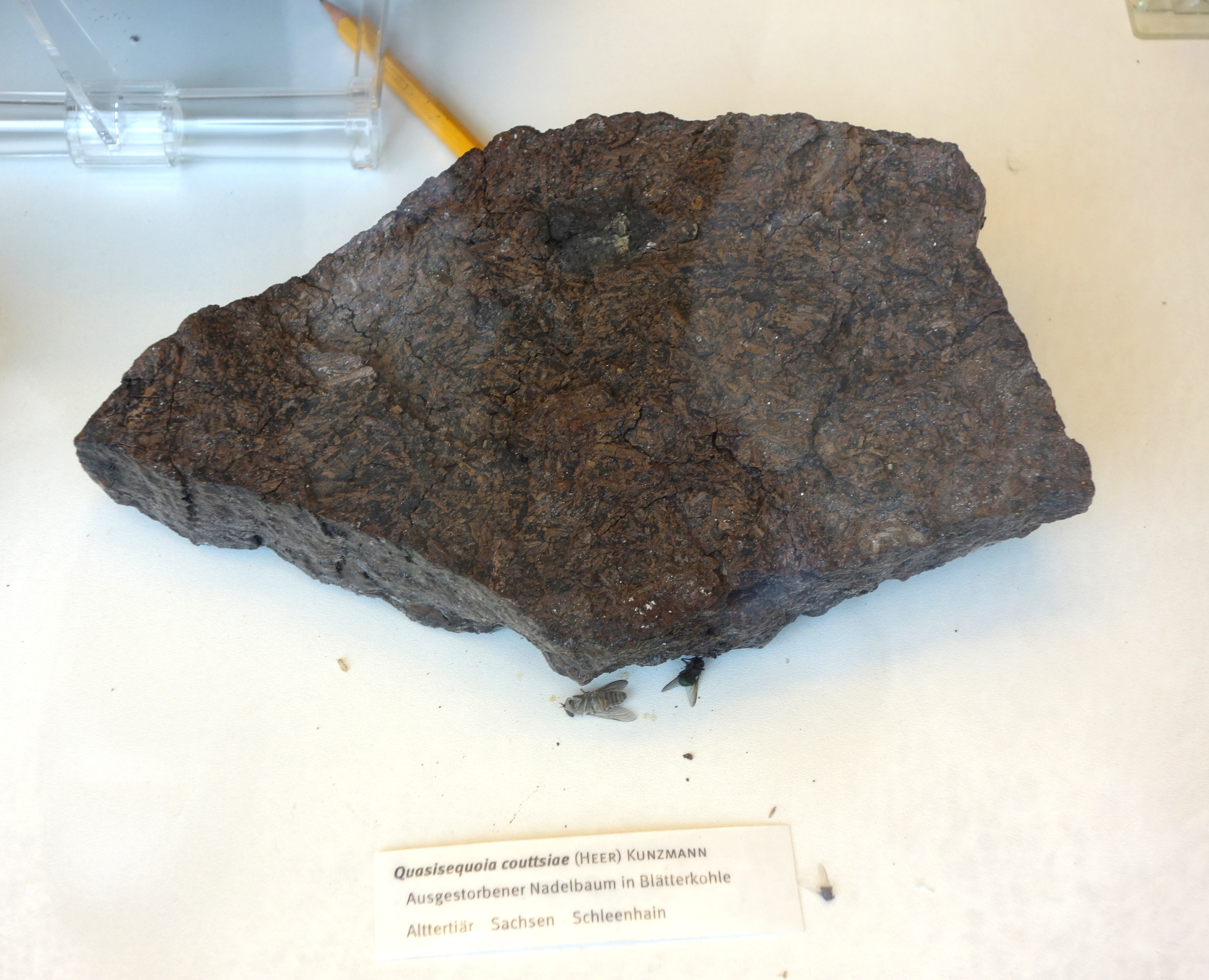

Scientific classification
- Kingdom: Plantae
- Clade: Tracheophytes
- Clade: Gymnospermae
- Division: Pinophyta
- Class: Pinopsida
- Order: Cupressales
- Family: Cupressaceae
- Subfamily: Sequoioideae
- Genus: †Quasisequoia

Other species
- †Q.couttsiae type; † Q.florinii; † Q.scanica; † Q.aasenensis; † Q.suecica

Synonyms
- †Sequoia couttsiae

= Quasisequoia =

Quasisequoia Temporal range: Santonian–Miocene

Extinct genus of redwood

Quasisequoia is an extinct genus of redwood conifers known from Europe. Fossils date from the Late Cretaceous to the Miocene. Fossils are known from Sweden, Russia (Kaliningrad), UK, Germany and the Czech Republic.

== Description ==
Quasisequoia had a uniform twig structure and distinctive leaf morphology. The shoots bear spirally arranged, decurrent leaves that may be either awl-shaped or lanceolate-linear. Leaf tips can vary from sharply pointed to more rounded and are typically free, with orientations ranging from slightly incurved to straight. The margins are generally smooth, though in some specimens they display small papillae set at irregular intervals. Leaves are amphistomatic, with stomata present on both surfaces; on the lower surface, the stomata may appear scattered, aligned in short rows, or grouped in irregular patches.

== Ecology ==
Quasisequoia is known to have inhabited the Baltic forests during the Paleogene. It was common around floodplain ecosystems.
