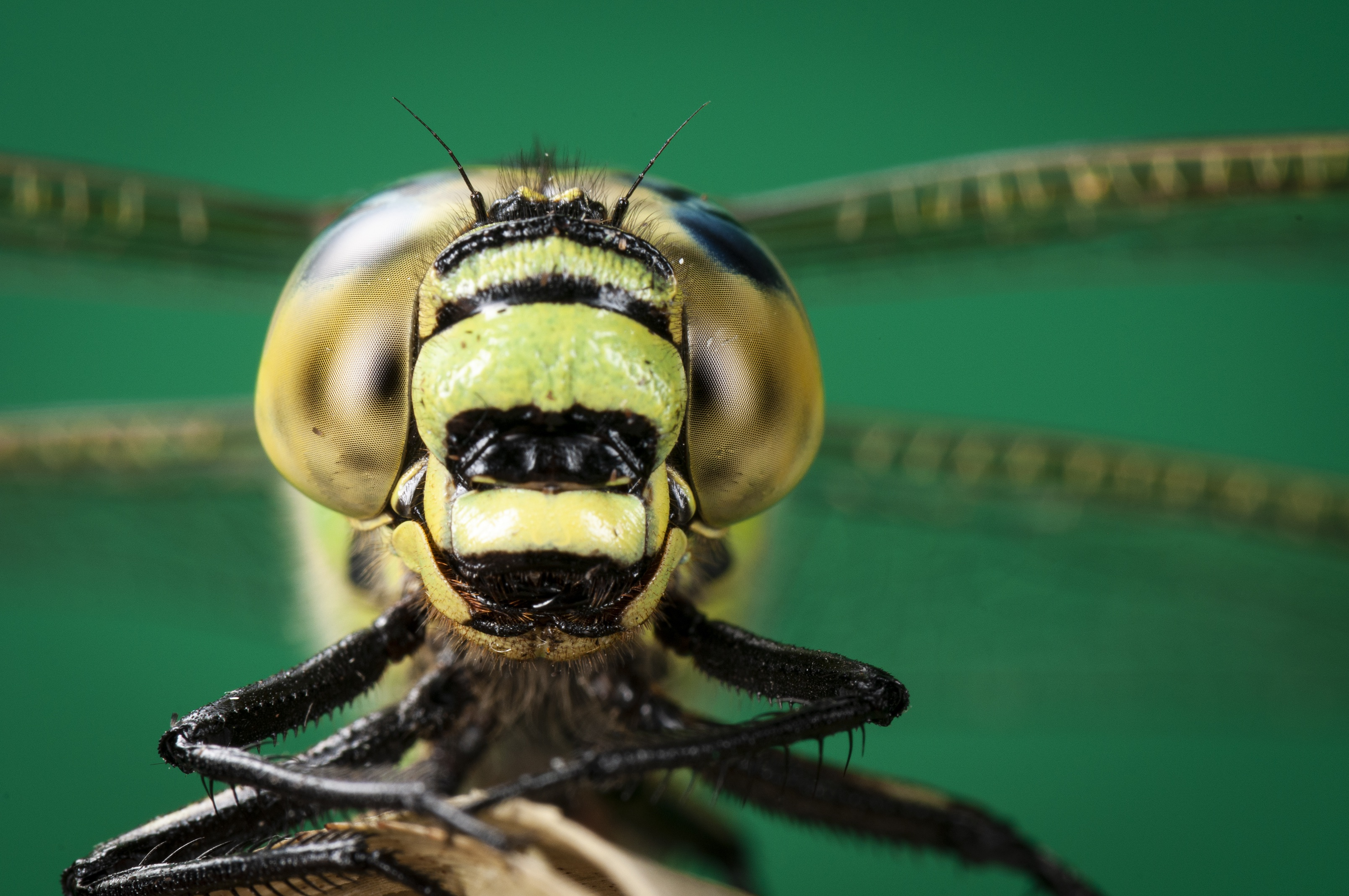
- Aeschnophlebia longistigma, Face, Korea
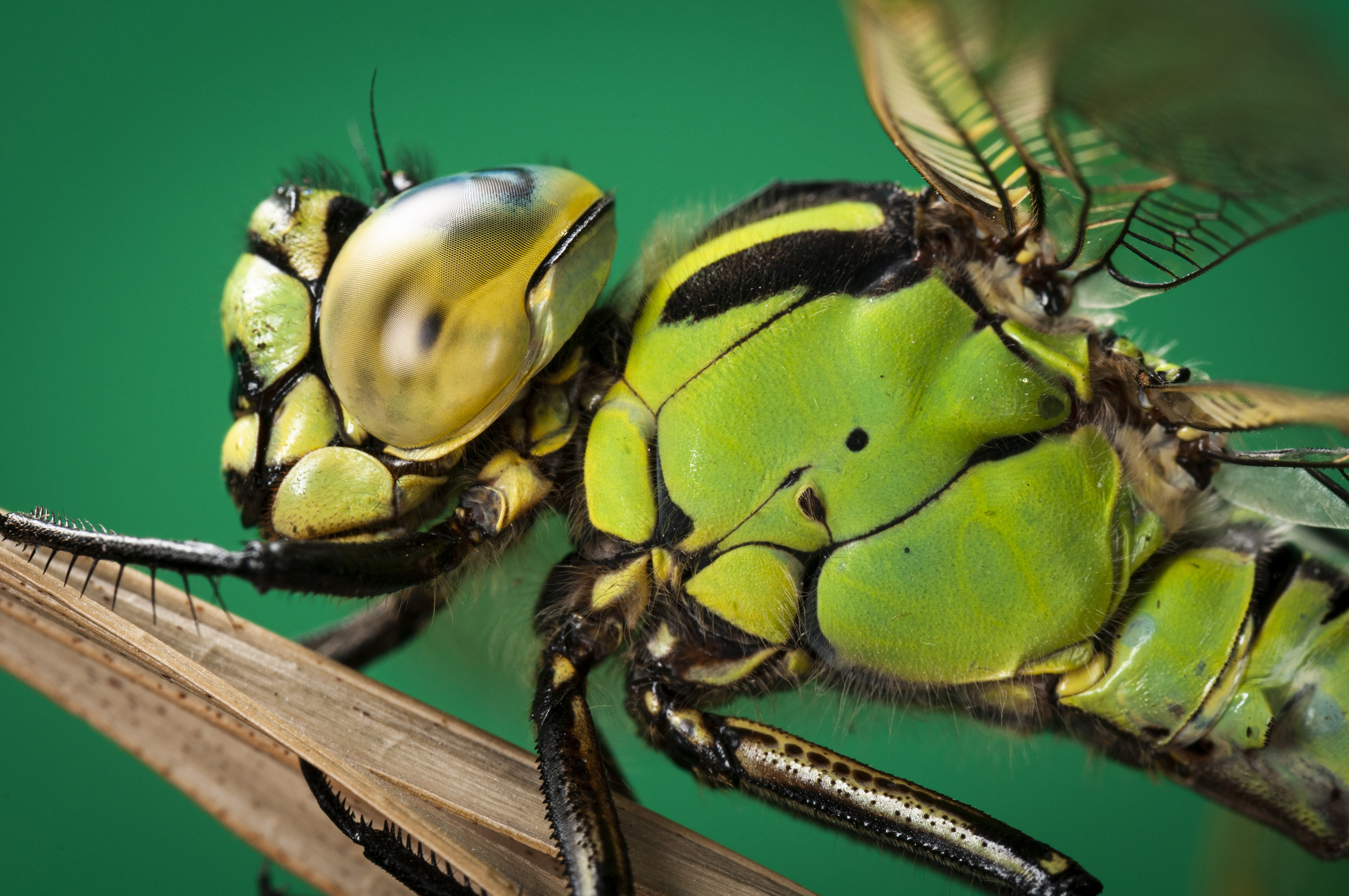
- Aeschnophlebia longistigma, Adult, Korea

Conservation status
- Least Concern (IUCN 3.1)

Scientific classification
- Kingdom: Animalia
- Phylum: Arthropoda
- Clade: Pancrustacea
- Class: Insecta
- Order: Odonata
- Infraorder: Anisoptera
- Family: Aeshnidae
- Genus: Aeschnophlebia
- Species: A. longistigma

Binomial name
- Aeschnophlebia longistigma Selys, 1883

= Aeschnophlebia longistigma =

Species of dragonfly

Aeschnophlebia longistigma is a species of dragonfly first identified in Russia, also found in China, South Korea, North Korea, and Japan. It is in the family Aeshnidae in the genus Aeschnophlebia.

== Description ==
It has green eyes with blue or grayish spots in them. Its face, abdomen, and thorax are all a yellowish green with black stripes. The legs are mostly black, but have a slight ombre of yellow coming down from the thorax. The pterostigmata are a light brown color. The males have an extra anal appendage that females do not possess. The stripes on the abdomen are long and go vertically from the thorax straight down to the cerci.

== Habitat ==
It can be found in wetlands with a lot of plant life. While it is widely distributed and more commonly observed across the Korean Peninsula and Japan, it is extremely rare in Russia, with limited and protected populations recorded near Lake Khanka near the border of Eastern China and South Eastern Russia, as recorded by Yakubovich and Koshkin (2016).

== Conservation status ==
It is listed as least concern by the IUCN.
