= Gesomyrmex flavescens =

Scientific classification
- Domain: Eukaryota
- Kingdom: Animalia
- Phylum: Arthropoda
- Class: Insecta
- Order: Hymenoptera
- Family: Formicidae
- Subfamily: Formicinae
- Genus: Gesomyrmex
- Species: †G. flavescens

Binomial name
- †Gesomyrmex flavescens Dlussky, G. M., Wappler, T. & Wedmann, S., 2009

Extinct species of ant

Gesomyrmex flavescens is an extinct species of ant in the subfamily Formicinae.
