= Hampshire Basin =

Geological basin in England

Geological map of southeastern England and parts of France, showing the Hampshire Basin in its regional context.

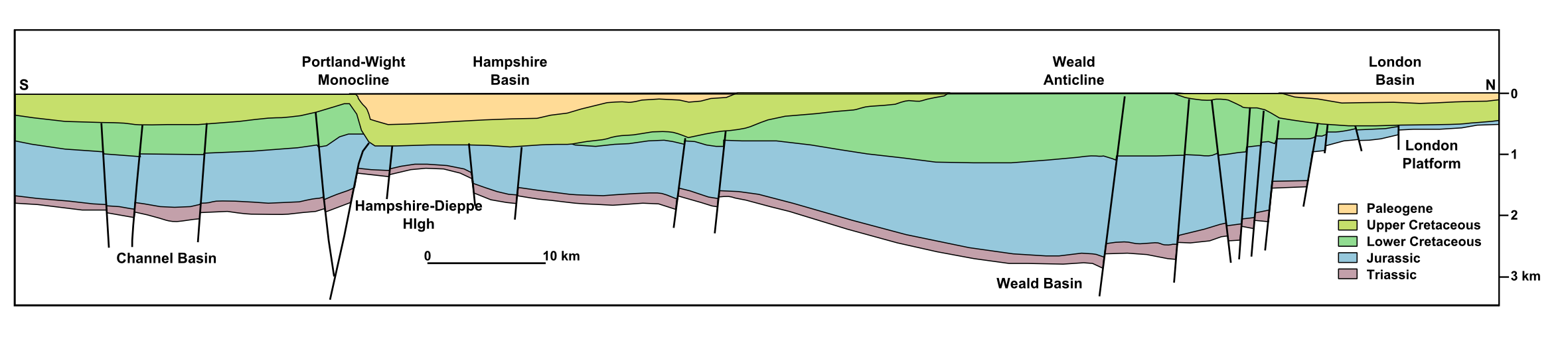
North-south cross-section of the upper crust of southern England, showing the Paleogene London Basin to the north and Hampshire Basin to the south. Also visible is the inverted nature of the Weald, which was a basin during the Early Cretaceous and thus has a relatively thick Lower Cretaceous sequence. Vertical exaggeration 1:5.

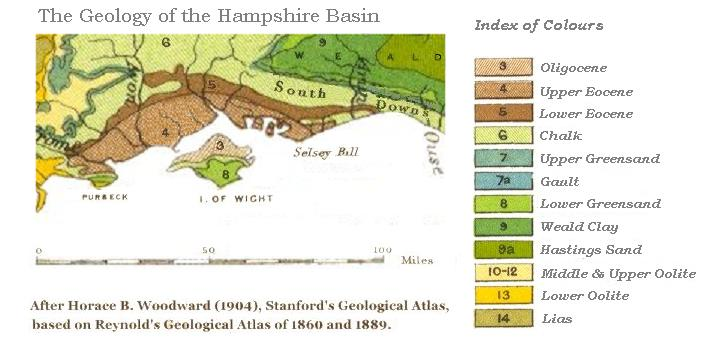
Geological map of the Hampshire Basin

The Hampshire Basin is a geological basin of Palaeogene age in southern England, underlying parts of Hampshire, the Isle of Wight, Dorset, and Sussex. Like the London Basin to the northeast, it is filled with sands and clays of Paleocene and younger ages and it is surrounded by a broken rim of chalk hills of Cretaceous age.

== Extent ==
The Hampshire Basin is the traditional name for the landward section of a basin underlying the northern English Channel and much of central southern England, known more fully as the Hampshire-Dieppe Basin. It stretches a little over 100 miles (160 km) from the Dorchester area in the west to Beachy Head in the east. Its southern boundary is marked by a monocline, the Purbeck Monocline, resulting in a near-vertical chalk ridge which forms the Purbeck Hills of Dorset, running under the sea from Old Harry Rocks to The Needles and the central spine of the Isle of Wight and continuing under the English Channel as the Wight-Bray monocline. The northern limit is the chalk of the South Downs, Salisbury Plain and Cranborne Chase. The basin at its widest is around 30 miles (48 km), north-west to south-east, between Salisbury and Newport, Isle of Wight. The area west of the River Avon is usually known as the Poole Basin.

== Geography ==
The basin includes areas of forest and heath including Wareham Forest, Arne and the New Forest and the large south coast settlements of Bournemouth, Southampton and Portsmouth. The coast has many drowned valleys (rias) including The Solent, Poole Harbour, Southampton Water, Portsmouth Harbour, Chichester Harbour, Langstone Harbour, Pagham Harbour, Yarmouth, Cowes and Bembridge. In addition to the northern half of the Isle of Wight which lies within the basin, the harbours contain inhabited islands including Brownsea Island, Portsea Island, Hayling Island and Thorney Island.

== Drainage ==
The Hampshire Basin has no single dominant river. In former times the Frome and Solent rivers would have drained much of the basin from west to east, fed by tributaries flowing from the north and south. At the end of the last ice age this system was disrupted by rising sea levels, which separated the Isle of Wight from the mainland. Today the western part of the basin drains via the rivers Frome and Piddle into Poole Harbour, and via the Stour and Avon directly to the English Channel. The central part drains into the Solent (directly or via Southampton Water), through the Lymington River, Test, Itchen, Meon, Hamble, Western Yar, Medina and Eastern Yar. The eastern part of the basin is a narrow coastal plain draining into the many harbours via small streams, and is crossed by larger rivers draining the Weald including the Arun and Adur.

== Geology ==
The main basin consists of an asymmetric syncline in the Cretaceous chalk, with a gentle dip southwards from Salisbury Plain terminating abruptly at a near vertical monocline in the south. The chalk surface dips from around 170 metres (560 ft) above sea level west of Winchester to 600 metres (2,000 ft) below sea level at Newport, before rising abruptly to around 200 metres (660 ft) above sea level in parts of the central hills of the Isle of Wight and the Purbeck Hills. The chalk can be visualised as a thin layer draped over rigid blocks of older rocks at depth, which have moved vertically due to the Alpine Orogeny.

Beneath the chalk the geology is complex. It is believed that a series of major blocks separated by faults trending NW-SE is fragmented into smaller blocks by numerous east-west trending faults; one such block acts as a trap for the Wytch Farm oil field. These blocks have moved vertically relative to each other during late Palaeozoic and Mesozoic times, resulting in considerable variations in the thickness of the various formations deposited over them before the chalk. Rocks of Lower Greensand (Aptian) age were deposited over an eroded surface, which ranges from Great Oolite (Early Jurassic Bathonian) to Weald Clay (mid-Cretaceous Hauterivian) in age. The chalk itself varies considerably in thickness, with the results of a marine transgression progressing across into Dorset from the east. There is evidence that the top of the Upper Greensand to the west is the same age as the oldest chalk in the Isle of Wight.

Above the chalk the basin contains Palaeogene sediments ranging from Thanetian (Palaeocene) age to Rupelian (Oligocene) age. The oldest beds, the Lambeth Group ('Reading Beds') and Thames Group ('London Clay') outcrop in narrow bands towards the perimeter of the basin, from the coast at Studland, around the perimeter of the Dorset heathlands, north and east past Romsey, swinging southeast past Eastleigh and eastwards towards Chichester, Worthing and Shoreham-by-Sea. Within this rim, over the greater part of the basin is an outcrop of younger Eocene deposits, the Bagshot, Bracklesham and Barton beds. The youngest, Oligocene beds (Bouldnor Formation) only occur on the northern Isle of Wight; the Headon Hill beds of the New Forest, formerly classified as Oligocene, are now regarded as late Eocene.

The simple basin structure is complicated by localised folding. A smaller outcrop of Palaeocene and Eocene deposits occurs in a small syncline to the south-east of Salisbury. An anticline to the north of Portsmouth results in the significant chalk ridge of Portsdown Hill within the younger sediments; the London Clay to the north contains the Forest of Bere. A similar structure further east causes chalk to outcrop between Bognor Regis and Worthing, separated from the chalk of the South Downs by a belt of Reading Beds and London Clay continuing from Havant through Chichester and south of Arundel to the coast at Lancing.

It is likely that the London and Hampshire basins were initially part of a single larger area of deposition covering the whole of southeast England during the Palaeocene. The two basins were progressively separated by the emergence of the Weald-Artois Anticline during the Eocene. By the Oligocene the London Basin was wholly dry land, and only a small part of the Hampshire Basin, centred on the modern Solent, was an area of marine deposition.

== See also ==
- Poole Basin - the western part of the Hampshire Basin
