= List of schools in Hampshire =

This is a list of schools in Hampshire, England.

== State-funded schools ==
=== Primary schools ===
- Abbotswood Junior School, Totton
- Abbotts Ann CE Primary School, Abbotts Ann
- Alderwood School, Aldershot
- All Saints CE Junior School, Fleet
- All Saints CE Primary School, Winchester
- Alton Infant School, Alton
- Alver Valley Infant and Nursery School, Rowner
- Alver Valley Junior School, Rowner
- Alverstoke CE Junior School, Alverstoke
- Alverstoke Community Infant School, Alverstoke
- Amport CE Primary School, Amport
- Andover CE Primary School, Andover
- Andrews' Endowed CE Primary School, Holybourne
- Anstey Junior School, Alton
- Anton Infant School, Andover
- Anton Junior School, Andover
- Appleshaw St Peter's CE Primary School, Ragged Appleshaw
- Ashford Hill Primary School, Ashford Hill
- Ashley Infant School, Ashley
- Ashley Junior School, Ashley
- Awbridge Primary School, Awbridge
- Balksbury Infant School, Andover
- Balksbury Junior School, Andover
- Barncroft Primary School, Havant
- Bartley CE Junior School, Bartley
- Barton Farm Primary Academy, Winchester
- Barton Stacey CE Primary School, Winchester
- Beaulieu Village Primary School, Beaulieu
- Bedenham Primary School, Gosport
- Bentley CE Primary School, Bentley
- Berewood Primary School, Waterlooville
- Berrywood Primary School, Hedge End
- Bidbury Infant School, Bedhampton
- Bidbury Junior School, Bedhampton
- Binsted CE Primary School, Binsted
- Bishop's Waltham Infant School, Bishop's Waltham
- Bishop's Waltham Junior School, Bishop's Waltham
- Bishopswood Infant School, Tadley
- Bishopswood Junior School, Tadley
- Blackfield Primary School, Blackfield
- Boorley Park Primary School, Botley
- Bordon Infant School, Bordon
- Bordon Junior School, Bordon
- Bosmere Junior School, Havant
- Botley CE Primary School, Botley
- Braishfield Primary School, Braishfield
- Bramley CE Primary School, Bramley
- Bransgore CE Primary School, Bransgore
- Breamore CE Primary School, Breamore
- Brockenhurst CE Primary School, Brockenhurst
- Brockhurst Primary School, Gosport
- Broughton Primary School, Broughton
- Burghclere Primary School, Burghclere
- Buriton Primary School, Buriton
- Burley Primary School, Burley
- Burnham Copse Primary School, Tadley
- Bursledon CE Infant School, Bursledon
- Bursledon Junior School, Bursledon
- Buryfields Infant School, Odiham
- The Butts Primary School, Alton
- Cadland Primary School, Holbury
- Calmore Infant School, Totton and Eling
- Calmore Junior School, Totton and Eling
- The Cambridge Primary School, Aldershot
- Castle Hill Infant School, Basingstoke
- Castle Hill Primary School, Basingstoke
- Castle Primary School, Portchester
- Catherington CE Infant School, Catherington
- Chalk Ridge Primary School, Brighton Hill
- Chandler's Ford Infant School, Chandler's Ford
- Charles Kingsley's CE Primary School, Eversley
- Chawton CE Primary School, Chawton
- Cherbourg Primary School, Eastleigh
- Cheriton Primary School, Cheriton
- Cherrywood Community Primary School, Farnborough
- Chiltern Primary School, Basingstoke
- Church Crookham Junior School, Fleet
- Clanfield Junior School, Clanfield
- Clatford CE Primary School, Goodworth Clatford
- Cliddesden Primary School, Cliddesden
- Colden Common Primary School, Colden Common
- Compton All Saints' CE Primary School, Compton
- Copythorne CE Infant School, Copythorne
- Cornerstone CE Primary School, Whiteley
- Cove Infant School, Cove
- Cove Junior School, Cove
- Cranford Park CE Primary School, Yateley
- The Crescent Primary School, Eastleigh
- Crofton Anne Dale Infant School, Stubbington
- Crofton Anne Dale Junior School, Stubbington
- Crofton Hammond Infant School, Stubbington
- Crofton Hammond Junior School, Stubbington
- Crondall Primary School, Crondall
- Crookham CE Infant School, Church Crookham
- Cupernham Infant School, Romsey
- Cupernham Junior School, Romsey
- Curdridge Primary School, Curdridge
- Denmead Infant School, Denmead
- Denmead Junior School, Denmead
- Dogmersfield CE Primary School, Dogmersfield
- Droxford Junior School, Droxford
- Durley CE Primary School, Durley
- East Meon CE Primary School, East Meon
- Ecchinswell and Sydmonton CE Primary School, Ecchinswell
- Eling Infant School and Nursery, Eling
- Elson Infant School, Gosport
- Elson Junior School, Gosport
- Elvetham Heath Primary School, Elvetham Heath
- Emsworth Primary School, Emsworth
- Endeavour Primary School, Andover
- Fair Oak Infant School, Fair Oak
- Fair Oak Junior School, Fair Oak
- Fairfield Infant School, Havant
- Fairfields Primary School, Basingstoke
- Farnborough Grange Nursery & Infant Community School, Farnborough
- Fawley Infant School, Fawley
- The Ferns Primary Academy, Farnborough
- Fleet Infant School, Fleet
- Fordingbridge Infant School, Fordingbridge
- Fordingbridge Junior School, Fordingbridge
- Four Lanes Community Junior School, Chineham
- Four Lanes Infant School, Chineham
- Four Marks CE Primary School, Four Marks
- Foxhills Infant School, Ashurst
- Foxhills Junior School, Ashurst
- Freegrounds Infant School, Hedge End
- Freegrounds Junior School, Hedge End
- Frogmore Infant School, Frogmore
- Frogmore Junior School, Frogmore
- Front Lawn Primary Academy, Leigh Park
- Froxfield CE Primary and Pre-School, High Cross, Froxfield and Privett
- Fryern Infant School, Chandler's Ford
- Fryern Junior School, Chandler's Ford
- Gomer Infant School, Alverstoke
- Gomer Junior School, Alverstoke
- Grange Community Junior School, Farnborough
- Grange Infant School, Rowner
- Grange Junior School, Rowner
- Grateley Primary School, Grateley
- Grayshott CE Primary School, Grayshott
- Great Binfields Primary School, Chineham
- Greatham Primary School, Greatham
- Greenfields Junior School, Hartley Wintney
- Guillemont Junior School, Farnborough
- Hale Primary School, Hale
- Halterworth Primary School, Romsey
- Hamble Primary School, Hamble-le-Rice
- Hambledon Primary School, Hambledon
- Harestock Primary School, Harestock
- Harrison Primary School, Fareham
- Hart Plain Infant School, Cowplain
- Hart Plain Junior School, Cowplain
- Haselworth Primary School, Gosport
- Hatch Warren Infant School, Basingstoke
- Hatch Warren Junior School, Basingstoke
- Hawley Primary School, Blackwater
- Hazel Wood Infant School, Totton
- Heatherside Infant School, Fleet
- Heatherside Junior School, Fleet
- Herne Junior School, Petersfield
- Hiltingbury Infant School, Chandler's Ford
- Hiltingbury Junior School, Chandler's Ford
- Holbrook Primary School, Bridgemary
- The Holme CE Primary School, Headley
- Hook Infant School, Hook
- Hook Junior School, Hook
- Hook-with-Warsash CE Academy, Warsash
- Hordle CE Primary School, Hordle
- Horndean CE Junior School, Horndean
- Horndean Infant School, Horndean
- Hurstbourne Tarrant CE Primary School, Hurstbourne Tarrant
- Hyde CE Primary School, Hyde
- Hythe Primary School, Hythe
- Itchen Abbas Primary School, Itchen Abbas
- John Keble CE Primary School, Hursley
- Kempshott Infant School, Kempshott
- Kempshott Junior School, Kempshott
- Kimpton, Thruxton and Fyfield CE Primary School, Kimpton
- Kings Copse Primary School, Hedge End
- Kings Furlong Infant and Nursery School, Basingstoke
- Kings Furlong Junior School, Basingstoke
- King's Somborne CE Primary School, Stockbridge
- Kings Worthy Primary School, Kings Worthy
- Kingsclere CE Primary School, Kingsclere
- Knight's Enham Junior School, Andover
- Knights Enham Nursery and Infant School, Andover
- Knightwood Primary School, Chandler's Ford
- Langrish Primary School, Stroud
- Lee-On-the-Solent Infant and Nursery School, Lee-on-the-Solent
- Lee-On-the-Solent Junior School, Lee-on-the-Solent
- Leesland CE Infant School, Gosport
- Leesland CE Junior School, Gosport
- Liphook CE Junior School, Liphook
- Liphook Infant School, Liphook
- Liss Infant School, Liss
- Liss Junior School, Liss
- Lockerley CE Primary School, Lockerley
- Locks Heath Infant School, Locks Heath
- Locks Heath Junior School, Locks Heath
- Long Sutton CE Primary School, Long Sutton
- Longparish CE Primary School, Longparish
- Lydlynch Infant School, Totton
- Lymington CE Infant School, Lymington
- Lymington Junior School, Lymington
- Manor CE Infant School, Holbury
- Manor Field Infant School, Brighton Hill
- Manor Field Junior School, Brighton Hill
- Manor Infant School, Cove
- Manor Junior School, Cove
- Marchwood CE Infant School, Marchwood
- Marchwood Junior School, Marchwood
- Marlborough Infant School, Aldershot
- Marnel Community Infant School, Basingstoke
- Marnel Junior School, Basingstoke
- Mayhill Junior School, Odiham
- Medstead CE Primary School, Medstead
- Mengham Infant School, Hayling Island
- Mengham Junior School, Hayling Island
- Meonstoke CE Infant School, Meonstoke
- Merdon Junior School, Chandler's Ford
- Merton Infant School, Basingstoke
- Merton Junior School, Basingstoke
- Micheldever CE Primary School, Micheldever
- Milford-on-Sea CE Primary School, Milford-on-Sea
- Mill Hill Primary School, Waterlooville
- Mill Rythe Infant School, Hayling Island
- Mill Rythe Junior School, Hayling Island
- Morelands Primary School, Purbrook
- Netley Abbey Infant School, Netley
- Netley Abbey Junior School, Netley
- Netley Marsh CE Infant School, Woodlands
- New Milton Infant School, New Milton
- New Milton Junior School, New Milton
- Newlands Primary School, Yateley
- Newtown CE Primary School, Gosport
- Newtown Soberton Infant School, Soberton
- Nightingale Primary School, Eastleigh
- North Baddesley Infant School, North Baddesley
- North Baddesley Junior School, North Baddesley
- North Farnborough Infant School, Farnborough
- North Waltham Primary School, North Waltham
- Northern Infant School, Portchester
- Northern Junior School, Portchester
- Norwood Primary School, Eastleigh
- Nursling CE Primary School, Nursling
- Oakfield Primary School, Totton
- Oakley CE Junior School, Oakley
- Oakley Infant School, Oakley
- Oakridge Infant School, Basingstoke
- Oakridge Junior School, Basingstoke
- Oakwood Infant School, Hartley Wintney
- Old Basing Infant School, Old Basing
- Oliver's Battery Primary School, Oliver's Battery
- Orchard Infant School, Dibden Purlieu
- Orchard Junior School, Dibden Purlieu
- Orchard Lea Infant School, Fareham
- Orchard Lea Junior School, Fareham
- Otterbourne CE Primary School, Otterbourne
- Our Lady and St Joseph RC Primary School, Pennington
- Overton CE Primary School, Overton
- Owslebury Primary School, Owslebury
- Padnell Infant School, Cowplain
- Padnell Junior School, Cowplain
- Park Gate Primary School, Park Gate
- Park Primary School, Aldershot
- Park View Primary School, Basingstoke
- Parsonage Farm Nursery and Infant School, Farnborough
- Peel Common Primary School, Gosport
- Pennington CE Primary School, Pennington
- Petersfield Infant School, Petersfield
- Petersgate Infant School, Clanfield
- Pilgrims' Cross CE Primary School, Andover
- Pinewood Infant School, Farnborough
- Portway Infant School, Andover
- Portway Junior School, Andover
- Potley Hill Primary School, Yateley
- Poulner Infant School and Nursery, Poulner
- Poulner Junior School, Poulner
- Preston Candover CE Primary School, Preston Candover
- The Priory Primary School, Tadley
- Purbrook Infant School, Purbrook
- Purbrook Junior School, Purbrook
- Queens Inclosure Primary School, Waterlooville
- Ranvilles Infant School, Fareham
- Ranvilles Junior School, Fareham
- Red Barn Community Primary School, Portchester
- Redlands Primary School, Fareham
- Riders Federation, Leigh Park (Formerly Riders Junior School and Riders Infant School)
- Ringwood CE Infant School, Ringwood
- Ringwood Junior School, Ringwood
- Roman Way Primary School, Andover
- Romsey Abbey CE Primary School, Romsey
- Romsey Primary School, Romsey
- Ropley CE Primary School, Ropley
- Rowlands Castle St John's CE Primary School, Rowlands Castle
- Rowledge CE Primary School, Farnham
- Rowner Infant School, Rowner
- Rowner Junior, Rowner
- Rownhams St John's CE Primary School, Rownhams
- Rucstall Primary School, Basingstoke
- St Alban's CE Primary School, Havant
- St Anne's RC Primary School, South Ham
- St Anthony's RC Primary School, Titchfield
- St Bede CE Primary School, Winchester
- St Bede's RC Primary School, Basingstoke
- St Bernadette's RC Primary School, Cove
- St Columba CE Primary School, Fareham
- St Faith's CE Primary School, Winchester
- St Francis CE Primary School, Valley Park
- St James' CE Primary School, Emsworth
- St James' CE Primary School, West End
- St John The Baptist CE Primary School, Titchfield
- St John The Baptist CE Primary School, Waltham Chase
- St John The Baptist RC Primary School, Andover
- St John's CE Primary School, Basingstoke
- St John's, Gosport CE Primary School, Gosport
- St Joseph's RC Primary School, Aldershot
- St Jude's RC Primary School, Fareham
- St Lawrence CE Primary School, Alton
- St Luke's CE Primary School, Sway
- St Mark's CE Primary School, Farnborough
- St Mark's CE Primary School, Hatch Warren
- St Martin's East Woodhay CE Primary School, East Woodhay
- St Mary Bourne Primary School, St Mary Bourne
- St Mary's Bentworth CE Primary School, Bentworth
- St Mary's CE Junior School, Old Basing
- St Mary's RC Primary School, Gosport
- St Matthew's CE Primary School, Blackmoor
- St Michael and All Angels CE Infant School, Lyndhurst
- St Michael's CE Infant School, Aldershot
- St Michael's CE Junior School, Aldershot
- St Patrick's RC Primary School, Farnborough
- St Peter's CE Junior School, Farnborough
- St Peter's RC Primary School, Waterlooville
- St Peter's RC Primary School, Winchester
- St Swithun Wells RC Primary School, Chandler's Ford
- St Thomas' CE Infant School, Woolton Hill
- St Thomas More's RC Primary School, Bedhampton
- Sarisbury CE Junior School, Sarisbury Green
- Sarisbury Infant School, Sarisbury Green
- Scantabout Primary School, Chandler's Ford
- Selborne CE Primary School, Selborne
- Shakespeare Infant School, Eastleigh
- Shakespeare Junior School, Eastleigh
- Shamblehurst Primary School, Hedge End
- Sharps Copse Primary And Nursery School, Havant
- Sheet Primary School, Sheet
- Sherborne St John CE Primary School, Sherborne St John
- Shipton Bellinger Primary School, Shipton Bellinger
- Silchester CE Primary School, Silchester
- Sopley Primary School, Bransgore
- South Baddesley CE Primary School, South Baddesley
- South Farnborough Infant School, Farnborough
- South Farnborough Junior School, Farnborough
- South View Infant and Nursery School, Basingstoke
- South View Junior School, Basingstoke
- South Wonston Primary School, South Wonston
- Southwood Infant School, Southwood
- Sparsholt CE Primary School, Sparsholt
- Springwood Infant School, Waterlooville
- Springwood Junior School, Waterlooville
- Stanmore Primary School, Stanmore
- Steep CE Primary School, Steep
- Stockbridge Primary School, Stockbridge
- Stoke Park Infant School, Bishopstoke
- Stoke Park Junior School, Bishopstoke
- Stoneham Park Academy, North Stoneham
- Sun Hill Infant School, New Alresford
- Sun Hill Junior School, New Alresford
- Swanmore CE Primary School, Swanmore
- Tadley Community Primary School, Tadley
- Talavera Infant School, Aldershot
- Talavera Junior School, Aldershot
- Tavistock Infant School, Fleet
- Tiptoe Primary School, Tiptoe
- Titchfield Primary School, Titchfield
- Tower Hill Primary School, Farnborough
- Trosnant Infant School, Leigh Park
- Trosnant Junior School, Leigh Park
- Tweseldown Infant School, Church Crookham
- Twyford St Mary's CE Primary School, Twyford
- Upham CE Primary School, Upham
- Uplands Primary School, Fareham
- Velmead Junior School, Fleet
- Vernham Dean Gillum's CE Primary School, Vernham Dean
- Vigo Primary School, Andover
- Wallisdean Infant School, Fareham
- Wallisdean Junior School, Fareham
- Wallop Primary School, Nether Wallop
- Warren Park Primary School, Leigh Park
- Waterside Primary School, Hythe
- Weeke Primary School, Weeke
- Wellington Community Primary School, Aldershot
- Wellow School, West Wellow
- Wellstead Primary School, Hedge End
- West Meon CE Primary School, West Meon
- West Tytherley CE Primary School, West Tytherley
- Western CE Primary School, Winchester
- Western Downland CE Primary School, Rockbourne
- Westfields Infant School, Yateley
- Westfields Junior School, Yateley
- The Westgate School, Winchester
- Weyford Nursery and Primary Academy, Bordon
- Wherwell Primary School, Wherwell
- Whitchurch CE Primary School, Whitchurch
- Whiteley Primary School, Whiteley
- Whitewater CE Primary School, Rotherwick
- Wickham CE Primary School, Wickham
- Wicor Primary School, Portchester
- Wildground Infant School, Dibden Purlieu
- Wildground Junior School, Dibden Purlieu
- William Gilpin CE Primary School, Boldre
- Winklebury Infant School, Winklebury
- Winklebury Junior School, Winklebury
- Winnall Primary School, Winnall
- Woodcot Primary School, Bridgemary
- Woodcroft Primary School, Waterlooville
- Woodlea Primary School, Whitehill
- Woolton Hill Junior School, Woolton Hill
- Wootey Infant School, Alton
- Wootey Junior School, Alton

=== Secondary schools ===
- Alderwood School, Aldershot
- Amery Hill School, Alton
- Applemore College, Dibden Purlieu
- The Arnewood School, New Milton
- Bishop Challoner Catholic Secondary School, Basingstoke
- The Blue Coat School, Basingstoke
- Bohunt School, Liphook
- Bohunt Farnborough, Farnborough
- Bridgemary School, Gosport
- Brighton Hill Community School, Basingstoke
- Brookfield Community School, Sarisbury Green
- The Burgate School, Fordingbridge
- Calthorpe Park School, Fleet
- Cams Hill School, Fareham
- Clere School, Burghclere
- The Costello School, Basingstoke
- Court Moor School, Fleet
- Cove School, Cove
- The Cowplain School, Cowplain
- Cranbourne School, Basingstoke
- Crestwood Community School, Boyatt Wood
- Crofton School, Stubbington
- Crookhorn College, Waterlooville
- Danebury School, Stockbridge
- Deer Park School, Hedge End
- Eggar's School, Holybourne
- Everest Community Academy, Basingstoke
- Fareham Academy, Fareham
- Frogmore Community College, Yateley
- Hamble School, Hamble-le-Rice
- Harrow Way Community School, Andover
- Havant Academy, Havant
- The Hayling College, Hayling Island
- Henry Beaufort School, Harestock
- The Henry Cort Community College, Fareham
- Horndean Technology College, Waterlooville
- Hounsdown School, Totton
- The Hurst School, Baughurst
- John Hanson Community School, Andover
- King's Academy Bay House, Gosport
- King's Academy Brune Park, Gosport
- Kings' School, Winchester
- The Mountbatten School, Romsey
- New Forest Academy, Holbury
- Noadswood School, Dibden Purlieu
- Oaklands Catholic School, Waterlooville
- Oakmoor School, Bordon
- Park Community School, Havant
- Perins School, New Alresford
- The Petersfield School, Petersfield
- Portchester Community School, Portchester
- Priestlands School, Pennington
- Purbrook Park School, Purbrook
- Ringwood School, Ringwood
- Robert May's School, Odiham
- The Romsey School, Romsey
- Swanmore College, Swanmore
- Testbourne Community School, Whitchurch
- Testwood School, Totton
- Thornden School, Chandler's Ford
- Toynbee School, Chandler's Ford
- The Vyne Community School, Basingstoke
- Warblington School, Warblington
- The Wavell School, Farnborough
- The Westgate School, Winchester
- Wildern School, Hedge End
- Winton Community Academy, Andover
- Wyvern College, Fair Oak
- Yateley School, Yateley

=== Special and alternative schools ===
- The Ashwood Academy, Basingstoke
- The Austen Academy, Basingstoke
- Baycroft School, Stubbington
- The Bridge Education Centre, Eastleigh
- Coppice Spring Academy, Basingstoke
- Dove House School, Basingstoke
- The Eaglewood School, New Milton
- Forest Park School, Totton
- Glenwood School, Emsworth
- Greenwood School, Dibden
- Heathfield Special School, Fareham
- Henry Tyndale School, Farnborough
- Hollywater School, Bordon
- Icknield School, Andover
- The Key Education Centre, Gosport
- Lakeside School, Chandler's Ford
- Limington House School, Basingstoke
- LWS Academy, Sarisbury Green
- Maple Ridge School, Basingstoke
- The Mark Way School, Andover
- Norman Gate School, Andover
- Oak Lodge School, Dibden Purlieu
- Osborne School, Winchester
- Prospect School, Havant
- Rachel Madocks School, Cowplain
- Riverside Community Special School, Purbrook
- Rowhill School, Aldershot
- St Francis Special School, Fareham
- Samuel Cody Specialist Sports College, Farnborough
- Saxon Wood School, Rooksdown
- Shepherds Down Special School, Compton
- Smannell Field School, Andover
- The Waterloo School, Waterlooville
- Wolverdene Special School, Andover

== Independent schools ==
=== Primary and preparatory schools ===
- Cheam School, Headley
- Daneshill School, Stratfield Turgis
- Durlston Court School, Barton on Sea
- Farleigh School, Andover
- Forres Sandle Manor School, Fordingbridge
- Grantham Farm Montessori School, Baughurst
- Grey House Preparatory School, Hartley Wintney
- Horris Hill School, Newtown
- Inwoods Small School, Bramdean
- Kingscourt School, Catherington
- Norman Court School, West Tytherley
- The Pilgrims' School, Winchester
- Princes Mead School, Kings Worthy
- St Neot's School, Eversley
- Sherborne House School, Chandler's Ford
- Stroud King Edward VI Preparatory School, Romsey
- Thorngrove School, Highclere
- Twyford School, Twyford
- Walhampton School, Walhampton
- West Hill Park School, Titchfield
- Woodhill Preparatory School, Botley
- Yateley Manor School, Yateley

=== Senior and all-through schools ===
- Alton School, Alton
- Ballard School, New Milton
- Bedales School, Steep
- Boundary Oak School, Fareham
- Brockwood Park School, Bramdean
- Churcher's College, Petersfield
- Ditcham Park School, Petersfield
- Embley, Wellow
- Farnborough Hill, Farnborough
- Hurst Lodge School, Blackwater
- The King's School, Fair Oak
- Lord Wandsworth College, Long Sutton
- Meoncross School, Fareham
- Moyles Court School, Ringwood
- New Forest Small School, Lyndhurst
- Rookwood School, Andover
- St Michael's School, Burghclere
- St Nicholas' School, Church Crookham
- St Swithun's School, Winchester
- Salesian College, Farnborough
- Sherfield School, Sherfield on Loddon
- Winchester College, Winchester

=== Special and alternative schools ===
- Bere Clinic School, Waterlooville
- Clay Hill School, Lyndhurst
- Compass Community School Hampshire, Medstead
- Coxlease School, Lyndhurst
- Dibden Park School, Dibden
- Elysian Animal Assisted Therapy and Leaning CIC, Liss
- Fair Ways School, Swanwick
- GLADE School, Totton
- Grateley House School, Grateley
- The Green Room School, Kingsley
- Hill House School, Boldre
- Inclusion School, Basingstoke
- Jubilee School, Waterlooville
- Kingsgate School, Fareham
- Light Years School, Fareham
- The Loddon School, Sherfield on Loddon
- Napier School, Aldershot
- New Forest School, Fawley
- Releasing Potential School, Havant
- St Edward's School, Sherfield English
- Southampton Priory Hospital School, Marchwood
- Southlands School, Boldre
- Tadley Court School, Tadley
- Treloar School, Holybourne
