= List of schools in Basingstoke and Deane =

Schools in Basingstoke and Deane.

== State funded ==
=== Children's centres ===
All centres are run by SureStart.

- Buttercups Children's Centre
- Honeycomb Children's Centre
- Octopus Children's Centre
- Pebbles Children's Centre
- Westside Children's Centre

=== Primary/first schools ===
- Ashford Hill Primary School
- Bishopswood Infant School
- Bishopswood Junior School
- Bramley Church of England Primary School
- Burghclere Primary School
- Burnham Copse Primary School
- Castle Hill Infant School
- Castle Hill Primary School
- Chalk Ridge Primary School
- Chiltern Primary School
- Chineham Park Primary School
- Cliddesden Primary School
- Ecchinswell and Sydmonton C E Primary School
- Fairfields Primary School
- Four Lanes Community Junior School
- Four Lanes Infant School
- Great Binfields Primary School
- Hatch Warren Infant School
- Hatch Warren Junior School
- Kempshott Infant School
- Kempshott Junior School
- Kings Furlong Infant School and Nursery
- Kings Furlong Junior School
- Kingsley Church of England Primary School
- Manor Field Infant School
- Manor Field Junior School
- Marnel Community Infant School
- Merton Infant School
- Merton Junior School
- North Waltham Primary School
- Oakley Church of England Junior School
- Oakley Infant School
- Oakridge Infant School
- Oakridge Junior School
- Old Basing Infant School
- Overton C E Primary School
- Park View Infant School
- Park View Junior School
- Preston Candover Church of England Primary School
- The Priory Primary School
- Rucstall Primary School
- Sherborne St John Church of England Primary School
- Silchester Church of England Primary School
- South View Infant School
- South View Junior School
- St Anne's Catholic Voluntary Aided Primary School
- St Bede's Catholic Voluntary Aided Primary School
- St John's Church Of England Voluntary Aided Primary School
- St Mark's Church Of England Primary School
- St Martin's East Woodhay C E Voluntary Aided Primary School
- St Mary Bourne Primary School
- St Mary's Church of England Junior School, Old Basing
- St Thomas' Church of England Infant School, Woolton Hill
- Tadley Community Primary School
- Whitchurch C E Primary School
- Winklebury Infant School
- Winklebury Junior School
- Woolton Hill Junior School

=== Secondary schools ===
- Aldworth School
- Bishop Challoner Catholic Secondary School
- Brighton Hill Community School
- The Clere School And Technology College
- The Costello School
- Cranbourne School
- Everest Community Academy
- The Hurst School
- Testbourne Community School
- The Vyne Community School

=== Special schools ===
- Coppice Spring Academy
- Dove House School
- Limington House School
- Maple Ridge School
- Saxon Wood School

== Independent schools ==
=== Primary/first schools ===
- Daneshill School

=== Independent special schools ===
- The Loddon School

=== Independent primary/secondary schools ===
- The Costello School
- Sherfield School

== Further education colleges ==
- Basingstoke College of Technology
- Queen Mary's College
