= Totton College =

Further education college in Totton, Southampton, Hampshire, New England

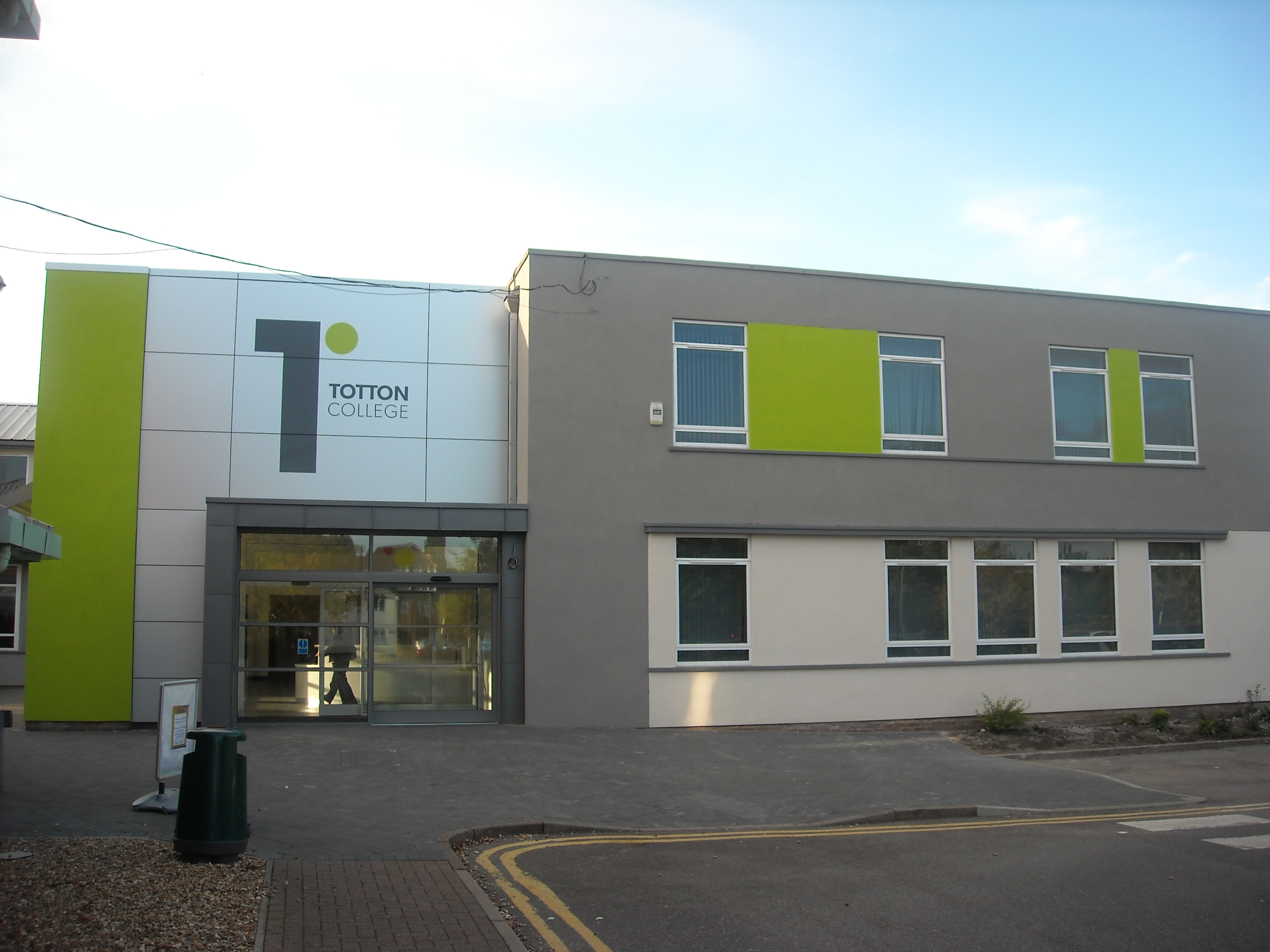
- The Water Lane entrance of the college.

Location
- Water Lane; Totton, Southampton, Hampshire, SO40 3ZX; England; 50.92099°N 1.50805°W

Information
- Type: Further education college
- Motto: Be Who You Want To Be
- Established: 1955; 71 years ago
- Local authority: Hampshire County Council
- Department for Education URN: 130699 Tables
- CEO: Campbell Robb
- Principal: Elise Temple
- Gender: Coeducational
- Age: 16+
- Enrolment: 1,400 full-time, 5,000 part-time as of 2012
- Website: www.totton.ac.uk

Totton College is a further education college located in Totton, Hampshire, providing vocational courses and apprenticeships for 16–18-year-olds, and for young people up to the age of 25 who have an EHCP. These include BTECs, NVQs, GCSEs and Access courses. Courses are also available to students aged 14 - 16 who are not currently in full-time education and benefit from additional hands-on experience and training in addition to their mainstream learning.

Opening in 1955 as Totton Grammar School, it became a sixth-form college in 1969 and continued to expand its campus from the late 1980s onwards. Its main campus is off Water Lane in Totton, but it also has another other campus in Calmore Industrial Estate for its Motor Vehicle unit. The college previously offered a range of A-level courses but these were stopped from September 2015. The college merged with social justice charity, Nacro, in December 2015.

== History ==
=== Totton Grammar School ===
Totton Grammar School opened as a secondary school in the spring term of 1955 and was run by the Hampshire County Council. The school actually started with a first year intake in September, but, as the building was not yet ready, all the students had to be bussed to Eastleigh County High School, as nearer schools were operated by Southampton and not Hampshire CC. All 45 were taught as a single class, mainly by a Miss Stevens. This was split into 2 classes on the opening of the school building, when Mr Stevens (no relation) became Head.

As with many other Grammar Schools, entry to the first year, or first form, was conditional on passing the national 11-Plus examination, normally at the age of 11 or 12. With a nationally fixed school-leaving age of 16, pupils generally went on to complete their O-level examinations in the fifth form. After that, the more academically-inclined pupils from any secondary school in the area could apply to stay on for a further two years, in what were known as the lower-sixth and upper-sixth forms, to sit A-levels.

In reference to the public school system, the first five forms were split into four houses, made up of one class per year, named Ash, Beech, Holly and Oak. Each one was given a colour (red, yellow, blue or green respectively) and was used as the competitive focus of sports days, quizzes, competitions, theatrical and musical events.

=== Totton College ===
When the government decided to change the secondary school system and to phase out the grammar schools, the decision was made for Totton Grammar school to convert itself to Totton Sixth Form College, and then to simply Totton College. The conversion started in 1969, the first Autumn without a first form, and was completed four years later, the first Autumn without a fifth form and hence with no lower school. The college became independent of the local authority in 1993.

At this point, the college started to expand outwards from the original school buildings with additional surrounding facilities. The Recreation Centre was built in 1988, accompanied by the Rugby Clubhouse for Tottonians Rugby Club in the late 1990s and the new Learning Resources Centre in 1998. At this point the college was starting to expand and required more teaching space. In addition to the rooms in the LRC, the new South Wing and Calmore Road entrance was constructed in 2003 and the college acquired the Hanger Farm site which was opened as an arts venue in 2004. The CoVE building for Foundation studies was constructed in 2006, the new student atrium in 2010 and a new building for Media and Hairdressing in 2012. The latest addition was a new entrance hall area which was completed in Summer 2013.

The college experienced a difficult changeover of principal in 2011, as demonstrated by an Ofsted report in September 2011 that reduced the college's status from the previous 'Good' in 2008 to 'Inadequate'. The college appealed the decision at the time but has since undertaken major changes in structure.

In 2015, it emerged that Totton College was in serious financial difficulties and was seeking a merger with another institution. In April it was announced that Totton College would no longer offer A-levels from September 2015 following the failure of take-over negotiations with Eastleigh College. In June 2015, it was announced that the college would merge with the social justice charity Nacro. The addition of Totton College to Nacro was announced as the second largest not-for-profit merger 2015/16 by The Good Merger Index.

== Organisation ==
=== Leadership ===
Nacro's Director and Principal of Education, Elise Temple, is the current Principal of Nacro Education, supported by Hannah Avoth as Vice Principal and Campus Lead. Prior to this, Dr Maxine Room CBE was Interim Campus Principal from October 2017, following previous Campus Principal Derek Headrige, who joined the college in April 2016. In April 2015 the interim Principal was Jo Landles. He was supported by Jo Landles, Vice Principal; Rob Dunford, Assistant Principal for Enterprise, Innovation and Business Development; and Alex Richards, Assistant Principal for College Services.

The college is governed by a Board of Governors that comprise the leadership team, members of staff, members of the public and parents and elected members from Totton College Students' Union who represent the student body.

=== Faculties ===
The college now organises its courses and programmes into four core areas. Each area is supported by dedicated facilities and a defined leadership structure. As of September 2025, these areas are:

Vocational – Art & Design, Beauty Therapy & Hairdressing, Business, Care, Construction, Digital Skills & Media, Hospitality & Catering, Motor Vehicle, Music, Sport, Uniformed Public Services, Travel & Tourism.

Apprenticeships – Early Years Practitioner, Early Years Educator and Hair Professional. Apprenticeships are offered at Level 2 and Level 3, combining workplace training with on-site workshops and assessments.

Skills for Life – Everyday Living Skills, Life, Independence and Social Skills, Futures, Independence and Work, Practical Work Skills, Progress to Work/Life, Vocational Work Skills, Vocational Studies, and Vocational Gateway.

Pathways – Pathway to Engagement, Pathways to Education, Pathways to Employment, Pathways: Junctions and Supported Internship.

== Facilities ==
=== Water Lane ===
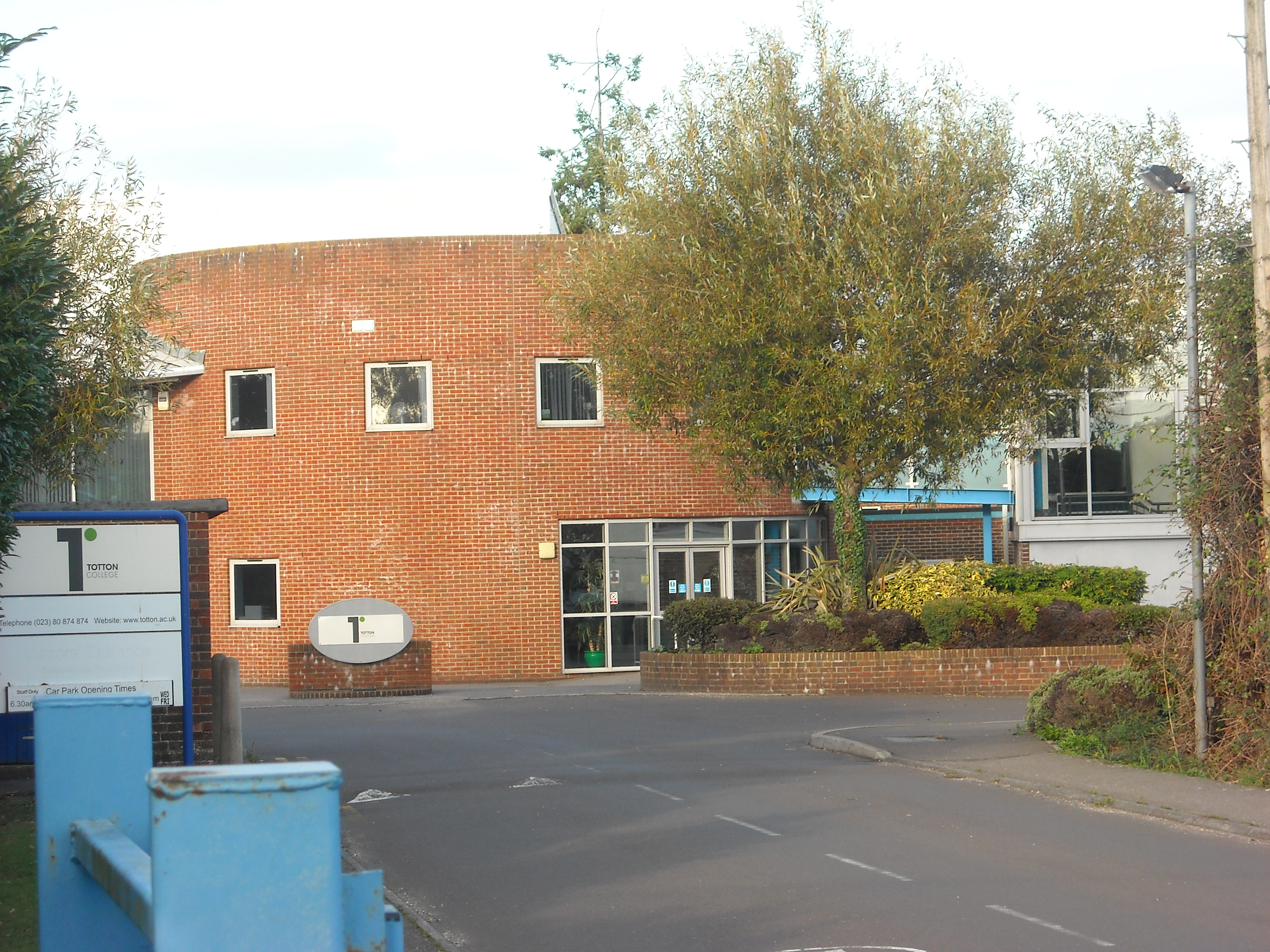
Totton College's Calmore Road entrance and South Wing as seen in September 2013.

The College's main campus is on the corner of Water Lane and Calmore Road. It is centered on a square courtyard, three sides part of the 1955 buildings and the final side, the South Wing, added in 2003. The north east, north west and south east corners of the quadrangle contain adjoining blocks and buildings. The North East corner has the Entrance atrium linking the Administration wing, the North West contains the student atrium connecting the CoVE building and the South East corner houses the Student lounge and refectory. Both the Student atrium and Refectory are student social areas and contain outlets of Costa Coffee. In addition to this main quadrangle, three buildings lie outside the rest of the buildings: the Learning Resource Centre to the North, the Recreation Centre to the East and the Media and Salon block to the West.

Other teaching aids include the newly created facilities for the Media department in the Media block. The campus is fully accessible and the Foundation rooms in The Cove are dedicated to the learning and support of students with learning disabilities.

The Recreation Centre, currently known as Totton Health and Leisure, is on site and is accessible to both students and members of the public. Run by the New Forest District Council, it houses a 70 workstation Gym, a 25m swimming pool, a 12m learner pool, a sports hall and a dance studio. Other publicly accessible facilities include the Opus Salon, which offers cheap hair and beauty treatment for everyone while providing experience for the students studying those courses.

=== Hanger Farm ===
The Hanger Farm Arts Centre is a facility in West Totton, formally managed by Totton College, and hosts a variety of events from drama, comedy, theatre and can be hired out for weddings or corporate use. Plans for the £1.5 million redevelopment of the farm into an arts centre began in 1999, was built over 2003 and opened in November 2004 following problems with the builder going into administration. It utilises the old eighteenth century barn of the farm and split it into three: meeting room at one end, a lounge and bar area and the theatre itself taking up half the barn. It is equipped with retractable seating and so the room can be used for both audience and floor events.

=== Motor Vehicle Unit ===
Totton College also operates another site across the local area. The college operates a Motor Vehicle Centre at Trinity Court on the nearby Calmore Industrial Estate, for teaching students in Motor Vehicle skills, which was opened in 2010.

== Transport ==
The Totton College campus has parking outside by the Water Lane entrance or Calmore Road entrance, the college encourages those travelling from further afield to use bus and rail services where possible. The main college campus is located on the route of the Bluestar 11 route between Southampton and West Totton. The nearest train station to the college is Totton railway station.

== See also ==
- List of schools in Hampshire
- List of further education colleges in Hampshire
- National Union of Students (United Kingdom)
