= List of further education colleges in Hampshire =

This article lists all the further education colleges in Hampshire, England. This list is part of a comprehensive list of schools in Hampshire, England. Hampshire County Council (HCC) organises the local education authority (LEA) schools into nine administrative areas.

== Sixth form and further education ==
This section includes sixth form colleges, secondary schools with sixth forms and FE inspections in higher education institutions.

- Alton College (Further education college)
- Andover College (Further education college)
- Applemore College (Secondary school and sixth form)
- The Arnewood School (Secondary school and sixth form)
- Barton Peveril College (Further education college)
- Basingstoke College of Technology (Further education college)
- Bay House School (Secondary school and sixth form)
- Brockenhurst College (Further education college)
- The Burgate School and Sixth Form Centre (Secondary school and sixth form)
- Eastleigh College (Further education college)
- Fareham College (Further education college)
- Farnborough College of Technology (Further education college)
- Farnborough Sixth Form College (Further education college)
- Havant College (Further education college)
- Minstead Training Project (Further education college)
- New Forest Academy (Secondary school and sixth form)
- Oaklands Catholic School (Secondary school and sixth form)
- Peter Symonds College (Further education college)
- Portsmouth Grammar School (Primary, secondary school and sixth form)
- Queen Mary's College, (Further education college)
- Ringwood School (Secondary school and sixth form)
- Sixth Form College Farnborough (Further education college)
- South Downs College (Further education college)
- Sparsholt College Hampshire (Further education college)
- St Vincent College (Further education college)
- Totton College (Further education college)
- Treloar College (Further education college)
- University of Winchester (Higher Education institution) (Further Education inspected only)
- Yateley School (Secondary school and sixth form)

== See also ==
- List of schools in Hampshire
