= Rebecca George =

British information technologist

Rebecca Gay George CBE FBCS (born 1961) is a former President of the British Computer Society and head of Deloitte's Public Sector practice; she is active in encouraging girls and women to participate in technology and IT.

== Early life ==
George was born in Basingstoke, England, in the Shrubbery, the local maternity hospital. Her father, Garth, was a nuclear physicist born in South Africa, who moved to the UK in 1949. Her mother, Elizabeth George, had been a social worker, and was a teacher who later became one of the first women ordained into the Church of England. She has two younger brothers, Matthew and Adam.

George went to school in Basingstoke, Fairfields Primary School, Harriet Costello comprehensive secondary school, and then the Sixth Form College Queen Mary's College, Basingstoke. She played the violin with the Hampshire County Youth Orchestra, and flew for the first time at 17 to Australia, on tour with the orchestra. Rebecca George read English Language and Literature at St Hugh's College, Oxford, which was an all-women college at the time. At St Hugh's College, she ran the drama society for three years and also taught herself to use the college computer, a Honeywell, so that she could earn money by typing up Fine Art students' theses. While she was at Oxford her Sixth Form College head-master suggested that she applied for a Rotary Foundation Scholarship, which she won. She used the scholarship to go to Boston University in the US and take a Master of Science in Broadcasting, specialising in Cable and Satellite systems. Rebecca George married in 1991 and has two sons. Her husband gave up work to bring up their sons when they were 1 and 3.

== Professional life ==
George worked in cable TV in the early 1980s in the US and UK, including for one of Robert Maxwell’s companies, SelecTV (US TV channel). Realising that cable and satellite TV was not taking off in the UK as fast as she had hoped, she joined a management consultancy, Spicer and Pegler for three years to broaden her range of skills. In 1988 she joined IBM as a sales rep, at the time IBM were just entering the professional services market. George stayed at IBM for nearly 20 years, in a range of roles in sales, HR and business process engineering. She worked for two years in the US in the mid-1990s, and for a year in France later on. George's focus has always been transforming business processes enabled by IT. In 2001, she started working with the Public Sector as the UK government was starting its digital journey. In 2006, she joined Deloitte as a Partner, in their Public Sector business. Initially, she worked with Central Government Departments, and in 2011 she took over Deloitte's UK Healthcare Practice.

In 2016, she led Deloitte's UK Healthcare Practice and was the Global lead for Public Sector Health and Social Services, in addition to being Deloitte's lead Partner for Healthcare in the UK, Europe, Middle East, and Africa. She specialised in clinical transformation enabled by technology and has a particular interest in improving patient outcomes in cancer and diabetes. As of March 2019, she leads Deloitte's Public Sector practice across 13 European countries. It was while she was working in the USA that she was inspired to get involved in a range of diversity initiatives, including increasing the participation of women in IT. Her passion for diversity has continued ever since. She has led or been involved with initiatives to encourage and support women in IT at every level – school projects, university applications and courses, graduate recruitment schemes, early career development, maternity leave and returners, executive promotion and retention, and board participation.

== Honour and other awards and roles ==
George was appointed Officer of the Order of the British Empire (OBE) in 2006 for services to IT and for her work supporting the Egan Review of sustainable community skills. A Fellow of the BCS, she was in 2013 chair of the BCS Policy and Public Affairs Board, and was elected as BCS Vice President and BCS Trustee in 2014 She became a Freeman of the City of London and Liveryman of the Worshipful Company of Information Technologists in October 2015. She was voted the 20th "Most Influential Women in IT" in 2014 and again in 2015 in Computer Weekly.

George was one of the 30 women identified in the BCS Women in IT Campaign in 2014. and was then featured in the e-book of these 30 women in IT, "Women in IT: Inspiring the next generation" produced by the BCS, The Chartered Institute for IT, as a free download e-book, from various sources.

She was appointed Commander of the Order of the British Empire (CBE) in the 2023 New Year Honours for services to diversity in the technology profession.
