= Osborne School =

Osborne School may refer to:

- Osborne School (Lake Worth, Florida), listed on the National Register of Historic Places in Palm Beach County, Florida
- Osborne School (Sandusky, Ohio), listed on the National Register of Historic Places in Erie County, Ohio
- Osborne School, Winchester, a special school in Winchester, England
