= Crookham Village =

Village in Hampshire, England

Coordinates: 51.274052°N 0.861053°W

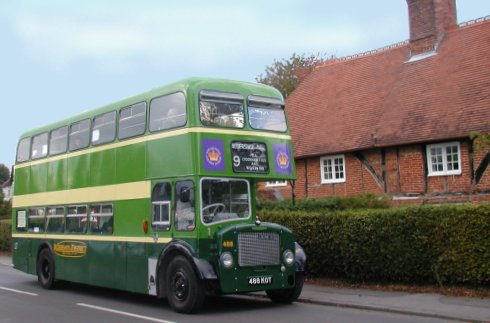
- A preserved 1960s Aldershot and District Traction Company bus (a Dennis Loline III) passes an old cottage in Crookham Village

- Location within Hampshire
- Population: 4,044 (2021 Census)
- OS grid reference: SU792524
  - London: 42 mi (68 km)
- Civil parish: Crookham Village
- District: Hart
- Shire county: Hampshire
- Region: South East
- Country: England
- Sovereign state: United Kingdom
- Post town: FLEET
- Postcode district: GU51, GU52
- Dialling code: 01252
- Police: Hampshire and Isle of Wight
- Fire: Hampshire and Isle of Wight
- Ambulance: South Central
- UK Parliament: North East Hampshire
- Website: Crookham Village Parish Council

Crookham Village is located south-west of Fleet, in northeast Hampshire, England and lies within the Hart District.

== History ==
Crookham (formerly Crokeham) dates back at least as far as the Domesday Book, although Crookham Village and Church Crookham did not become separate entities until the founding of the Christ Church in 1840. It is this church for which Church Crookham is named. Whilst Church Crookham has become largely subsumed in the urban dormitory town of Fleet, Crookham Village lies across the Basingstoke Canal from its neighbour, in a more rural setting.

The village centre has evolved around scattered ancient cottages, many of which are timber-framed. Agriculture and horticulture are important industries, and hops were grown and kiln-dried in the parish until 1974. Crookham was formerly noted for brick making and potteries which produced coarse red ware of the flower-pot-type. A traditional Mummers play is performed outside two of the public houses and on the village green each Boxing Day.

== Notes of Interest ==
The Basingstoke Canal passes through Crookham Village, and a wharf once existed at the historic former Chequers public house, now rebuilt and renamed The Exchequer. Here, timber was loaded and coal unloaded. A picnic area is now at the site, and the towpath provides is used by walkers. Another local pub, the Fox and Hounds (now reckoned to be in Church Crookham or Fleet), was host to the Fleet Folk club from the 1960s until 2001 when redevelopment work at the pub removed the venue. The club was run independently of the pub management in a separate function room and gained a reputation for featuring high quality musicians in the tiny room, often early appearances by artists later to become famous. The Spice Merchant (formerly the Black Horse) is the village's other pub.

One of the old houses to the south-west of the village is claimed to have been formerly King Henry VIII's holiday home, where he stayed during the hunting season to hunt deer (the namesake of the district of Hart).

Between 1963 and 1965, Crookham was home to future US astronaut Al Worden while he served on secondment to the Empire Test Pilot School at nearby Farnborough. In 1971 he became one of only 24 men to have flown to the moon when he served as Command Module Pilot of Apollo 15.

=== Twin towns ===
Crookham Village is twinned with Lévignen, France. Groups of families from one town cross the Channel for weekend stays with families from the other, alternating between visiting and hosting each year.
