= Peter Marchbank =

British conductor

Peter Marchbank, is a British conductor. He studied Music at Cambridge University and joined the BBC in 1969, where he was appointed Senior Producer of the BBC Philharmonic Orchestra in 1977. He has conducted orchestras across Europe, the Americas, Africa, and Australia.

== Biography ==
Peter Marchbank studied Music at Cambridge University, was briefly the Music Master at Queen Mary's School for Boys, Basingstoke and then joined the BBC in 1969. In 1977, he was appointed Senior Producer of the BBC Philharmonic Orchestra. In 1991, he joined the Orchestre National de Lille.

In Britain, Peter Marchbank has conducted the Northern Sinfonia and the Orchestra of the Swan. Overseas, he has conducted major orchestras in Australia, Bulgaria, Colombia, Costa Rica, the Czech Republic, Ecuador, Egypt, France, Germany, Lithuania, Norway, Panama, Poland, Portugal, Romania, South Africa, Sweden, Turkey, Ukraine and Venezuela.
