= Church Crookham =

Village and parish in Hampshire, England

Coordinates: 51.264°N 0.840°W

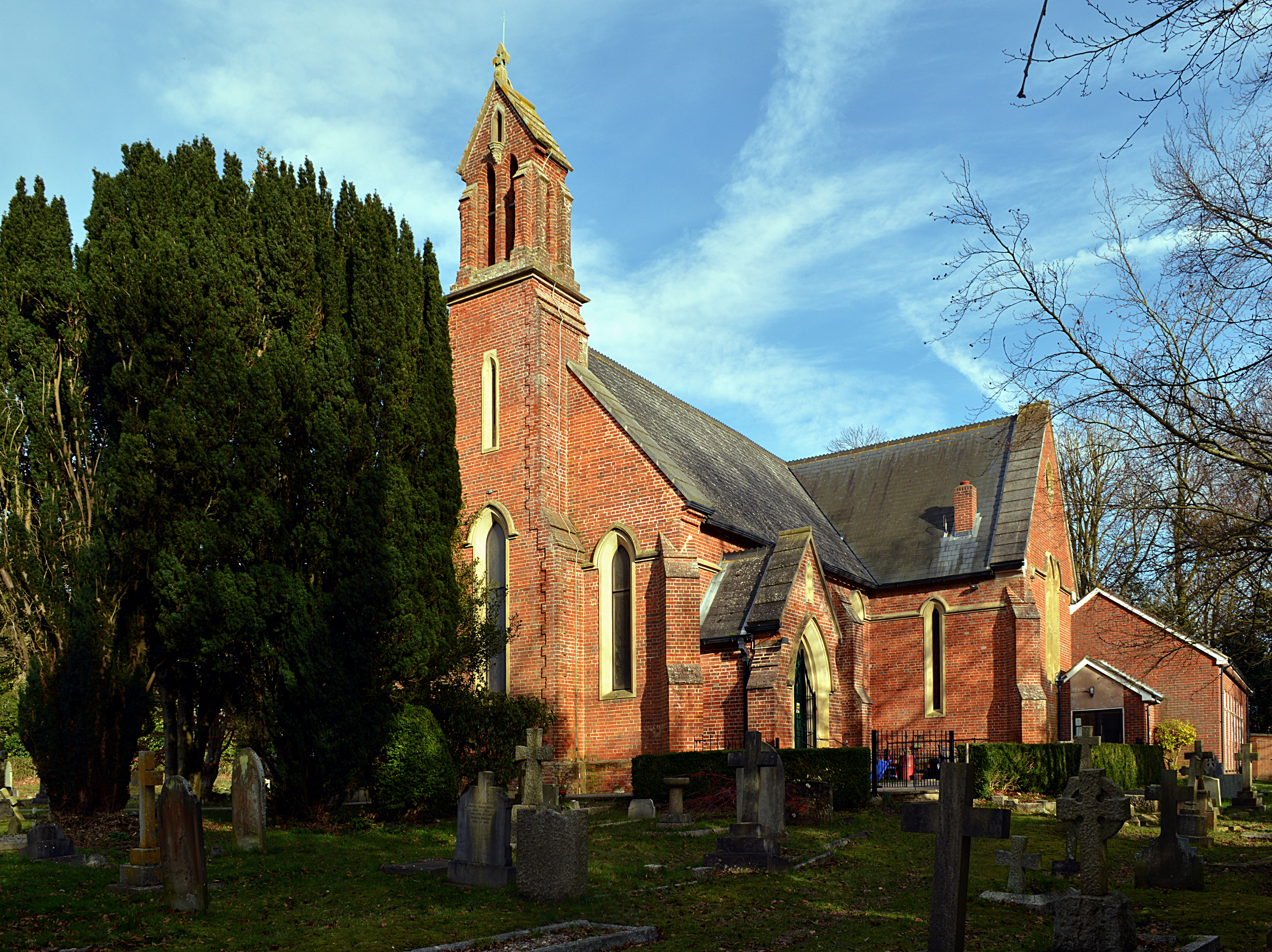
- Christ Church

- Location within Hampshire
- Area: 4.38 km^{2} (1.69 sq mi)
- Population: 11,002 (2021)
  - Density: 2,512/km^{2} (6,510/sq mi)
- OS grid reference: SU810523
- Civil parish: Church Crookham
- District: Hart
- Shire county: Hampshire
- Region: South East
- Country: England
- Sovereign state: United Kingdom
- Post town: FLEET
- Postcode district: GU52
- Dialling code: 01252
- Police: Hampshire and Isle of Wight
- Fire: Hampshire and Isle of Wight
- Ambulance: South Central
- UK Parliament: North East Hampshire
- Website: www.churchcrookham.org.uk

Church Crookham is a large suburban village and civil parish, contiguous with the town of Fleet, in northeast Hampshire, England. It is 38 miles (61 km) west-southwest of London. Formerly a separate village, it figures as a southern suburb of Fleet.

== History ==
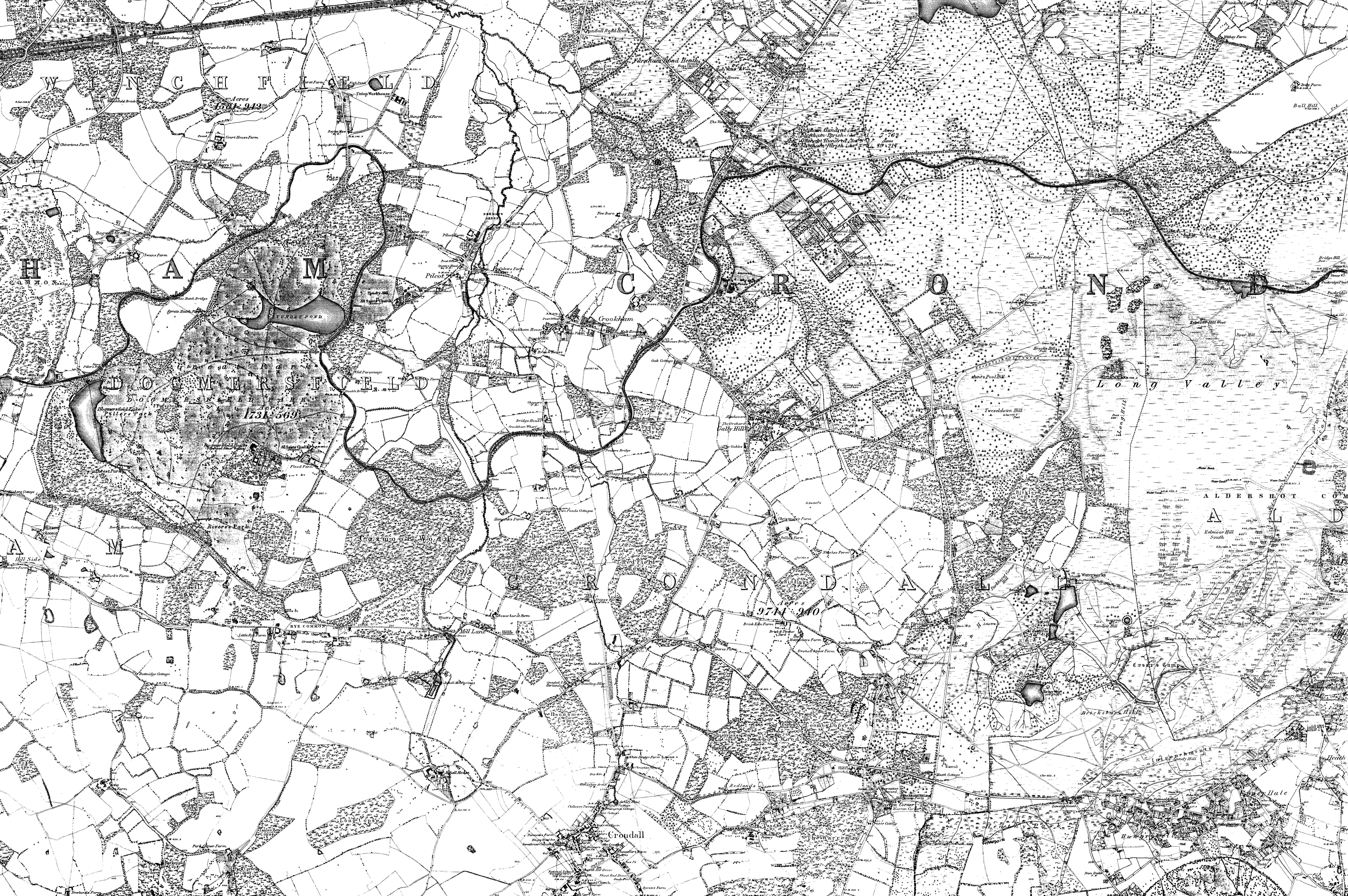
The west and central thirds and Crookham Village in about 1870. Click for broader map and to enable varied magnification.

Crookham (in many of the earliest records, Crokeham) dates back at least as far as the Domesday Book, though Church Crookham, including Crookham Village (its west part in traditional terms), was a hamlet until the first and only Anglican church was built in 1840. This is dedicated to Christ and for which Church Crookham is named – and to reflect all of the local land's ecclesiastical freehold farms and manors until the dissolution of the monasteries, as there is a Crookham in Berkshire and in Northumberland. In the 13th to 14th centuries, the De Burgh family held notable lands in Crookham of (under) the Prior and Convent of Saint Swithun, Winchester. During this time, one of the family saw a confirmation (re-grant) and was bailiff of the priory, in 1257. One of his grandsons passed all the lands of his mother in the "hamlets" of "Crookham" and "Velmeads" to another such grandson.

The parent sprawling parish of Crondall (in Crondall Hundred) was mostly rural at this time, with the 1831 edition of Samuel Lewis's Topographical Dictionary of England, which used the census returns to assess that Crookham had 623 inhabitants and not even mentioning the (at the time) much smaller Fleet. Other than Crondall tithing, this parish in 1800 consisted of four other tithings, Crookham (otherwise Church Crookham), Ewshot, Swanthorpe, and portions of Dippenhall (partly in Surrey, in Farnham Hundred). The soil is sandy here and in Ewshot, but is chalky in Swanthorpe and has some clay in other tithings.

Crookham was made its own church parish in 1842; Fleet was (before in this parish) in 1863. The same zones gained civil parishes counterpart statuses in 1894. The canal has served as the traditional divide of the two since Fleet was separated into its own church parish. In the centre west of Church Crookham is the Anglican church that continues to serve both the suburb and the older Crookham Village to the west. The ecclesiastical parish is roughly a broad rectangle with the church at the true centre.

Forestry was significant in eastern Crookham with several 'old copse enclosures' and areas of 'woodland'. A few of the neediest poor were housed in almshouses, by request of Isabelle Cottrell of Bath.

In 1903, the noted large homes and their owner-occupiers were:

Richard Moreton, DL	Crookham House
Frederick George Chinnock	Dinorben Court
A. J. F. Nugent	Gally Hill
J. Brandon	Redfields
Edgar Figgess	Court Moor
C. Lacy	Basingbourne

In 1903, the commercial crops were corn and root vegetables. Defunct hop farming is noted. This saw a revival ending in 1974 (see Crookham Village).

=== The Second World War ===
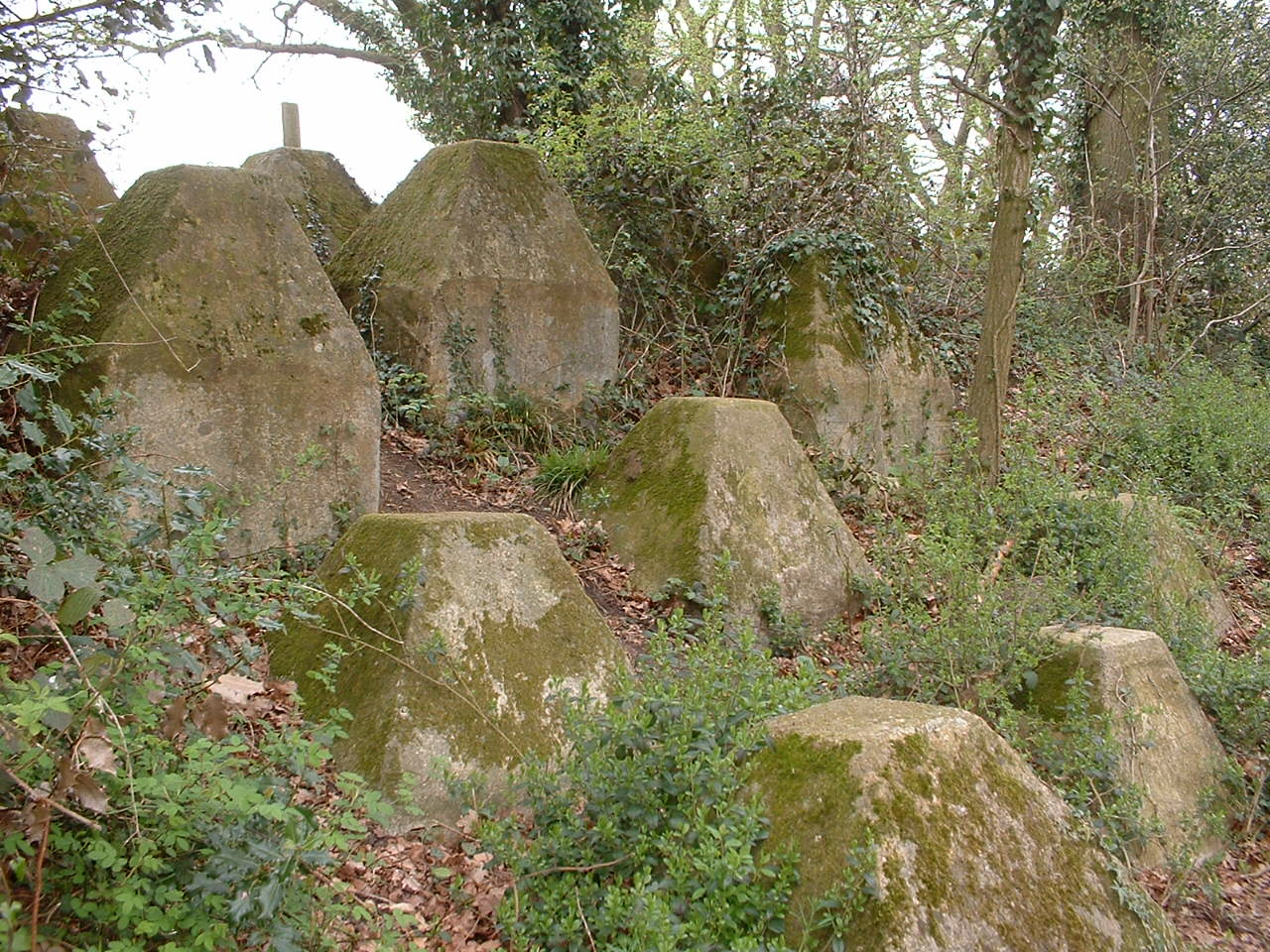
Dragons teeth at Crookham Wharf on the Basingstoke Canal.

Church Crookham lies on GHQ Line – the most important of a number of fortified stop lines constructed as a part of British anti-invasion preparations of World War II – and was at one of the most heavily fortified sections of that line.

=== Notable large newer neighbourhoods ===
In Crookham (a term only used in historic studies and as a local shorthand) southwest of Church Crookham and southeast of Crookham Village is Zebon Copse, over two hundred homes built in the late 1980s. A much larger development followed in the early 2010s at Crookham Park, on the former Queen Elizabeth Barracks site.

== Economy ==
=== Past notable employers and innovators ===
Vertu mobile phones were made at its Crookham headquarters until the business folded in 2014. The head office of Ferranti Thomson Sonar Systems was on the Redfields Industrial Estate until 2004.

==== Tobacco plantation and growers association ====
Church Crookham hosted Britain's only commercially successful tobacco plantation, which produced among other brands "Blue Pryor" cigarettes and pipe tobacco. Whole-process growing and manufacturing ended in 1938.

Redfields hosted the British Pioneer Tobacco Growers Association (BPTGA) after World War II. Tobacco was grown there, cured and a commercial brand 'Trowards Rayon D'or' was produced alongside the main purpose of supplying plants to members, curing and shredding their leaves then returning for their smoking. Charles Baggs served as the general manager, and Admiral Sir Clement Moody was among members. A BBC film was made during the 1950s entitled Tobacco Road, which featured the Redfields site and their site in nearby Crondall. The BPTGA closed after the death of owner Troward but Baggs supplied plants and cure the members' product some time after. The BPTGA employed twenty to thirty local staff. The site is now Redfields Garden Centre, save for Redfields House, which is now part of the buildings of St Nicholas' School.

=== Present notable employers and innovators ===
HSES Group's headquarters are in the suburb.

== Politics and administration ==
Map of the parish wards forming Church Crookham.

As currently drawn for the purpose of electing particular councillors to the District Council, approximately Church Crookham constitutes two (Crookham East, and Crookham West and Ewshot) of the 11 wards of the Hart District. Per the Hart District Council (Reorganisation of Community Governance) (Church Crookham) Order 2018, the parish is further divided into the parish wards of Crookham East, Gally Hill and Queen Elizabeth.

== Notes of interest ==
Motorists entering Fleet from the south and west are met with signs welcoming them to Church Crookham, whereas those entering the town from the north and east are welcomed to Fleet instead.

The Basingstoke Canal bounds the northeast and briefly the northwest of Church Crookham. Across this are modern outer neighbourhoods of Fleet.

The English poet John Keble was a regular visitor to Church Crookham's Christ Church.

Replaced by housing (Crookham Park) and landscaping from 2012, the British Army's 1938 to 2000 Queen Elizabeth Barracks was quite central in the parish.

=== Tweseldown race course ===
Tweseldown race course is a point-to-point horse racing track. This racing track was used for the eventing steeplechase in the 1948 London Olympics.

=== Filming location ===
Church Crookham has hosted scenes for several films. These include the 2002 James Bond movie Die Another Day, which used woodland and flat ground between the village and Aldershot to represent the demilitarised zone between North and South Korea. Church Crookham was also one of several English towns and villages (others including nearby Aldershot, Farnham, and Chobham) that served as filming locations for the 2006 movie Children of Men.

== Education ==
For a list of local schools, see the list of Hampshire schools.
