= Queen Mary's School for Boys, Basingstoke =

Location
- Vyne Road; Basingstoke, Hampshire, RG21 5PB; England; 51.274°N 1.089°W

Information
- Type: Grammar school
- Motto: Spiritum Nolite Extinguere
- Established: 1556
- Closed: 1970
- Local authority: Hampshire
- Gender: Boys
- Age: 11 to 18
- Fate: Became The Vyne Community School

Queen Mary's School for Boys (QMSB) was a maintained (state funded) grammar school in Basingstoke, Hampshire, England for boys aged 11–18. The school existed between 1556 and 1970 and was latterly funded by the Hampshire County Council Education Authority.

== Foundation ==
Queen Mary's School for Boys, Basingstoke, owed its origin to Queen Mary in 1556, when the pre-existing Chantry Chapel of the Holy Ghost, Basingstoke, was reopened as the Holy Ghost School, with the priest able to teach ten boys of the town. The Chapel had previously been closed during the reign of King Edward VI. The Holy Ghost School survived the death of Queen Mary in 1558, remaining at the Chapel until a purpose-built structure was erected on Worting Road, Basingstoke, in 1870. The first Schoolmaster was endowed in 1559 (at 12 pounds a year), to be quickly replaced by numerous others. In 1592, after Queen Elizabeth I visited the Chapel, the school was more in the hands of these masters than of the priest, but the Chapel became Crown property. For centuries the school provided basic education in Latin and numerical skills to young boys from the town, and just a few dozen of them at a time. Until well into the 19th century, the town's population was only partially literate as schooling was not yet a legal requirement for all children.

== New building ==
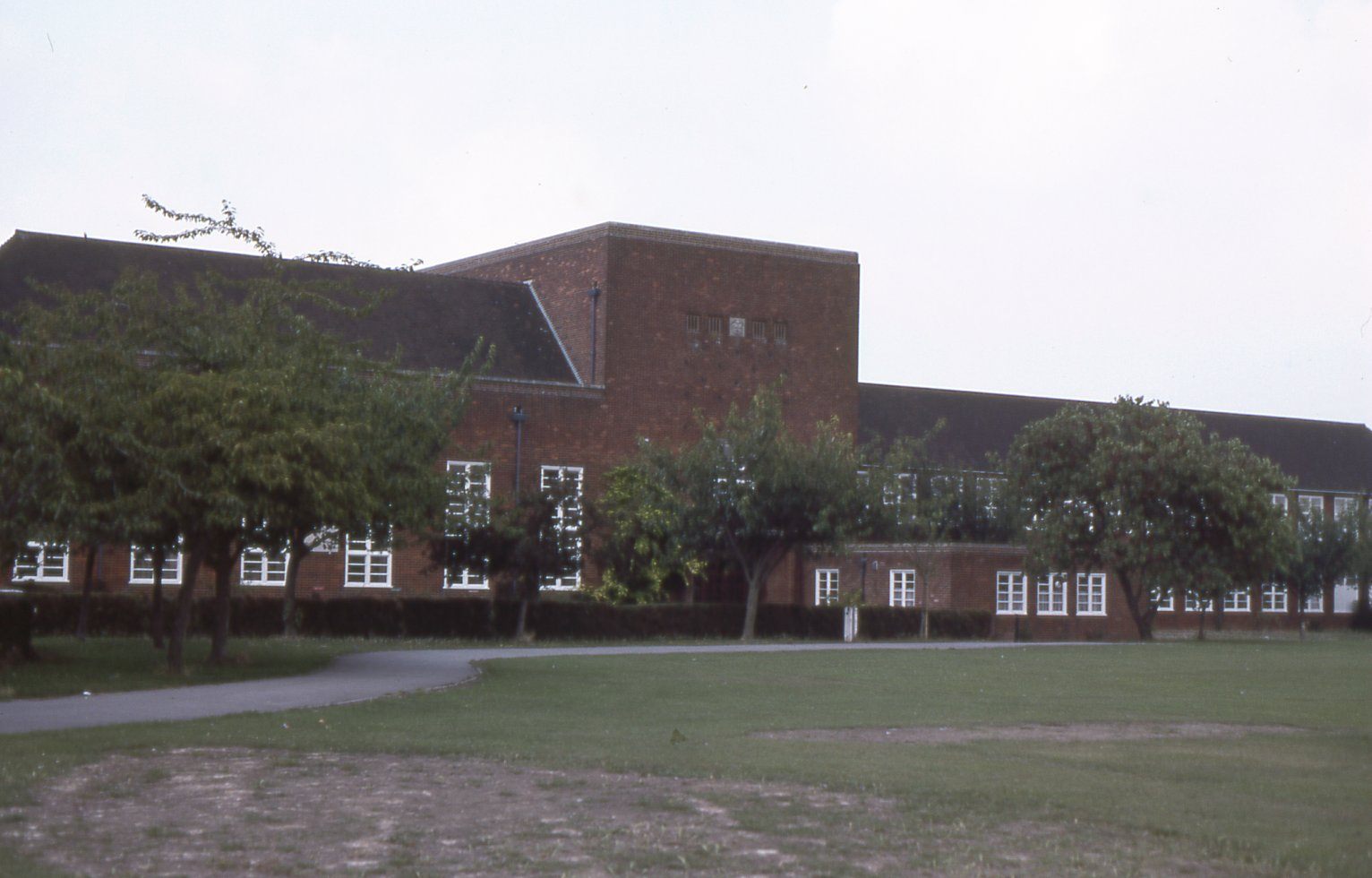
Queen Mary's School for Boys, Basingstoke – 1938 building

In 1938, the school moved to Vyne Road, Basingstoke, in a newly constructed building in the functional, modernist style of brick architecture of the period. A "Junior School" block, in a subsequent style was opened in 1965. In imitation of the independent schools, Queen Mary's School for Boys had Houses; pupils were assigned to Chapel, Sandys, White or Vyne, with Inter-House sports fixtures. House colours were as follows: Chapel – maroon with light blue, Sandys – scarlet with white, White – green with white, and Vyne – amber with black. Chapel house was named after the Holy Ghost Chapel where the school had originated. Sandys house was named after the Sandys local noble family. White house was named after Gilbert White, a noted local naturalist and writer and Vyne House drew its name from a nearby eponymous Elizabethan country estate.

== Traditions ==
=== Uniform ===
The school uniform was a black blazer, grey trousers, and white shirt for Senior Boys and a grey shirt for Junior Boys, worn with the school tie which had broad pale blue and navy blue diagonal stripes. The school badge was a white dove descending on a black background, with the letters Q.M.S.B. beneath. A subfusc suit could also be worn in place of the blazer and grey trousers, but latterly the habit had declined. Boys in the lower school, up to 4th form, wore a black peaked cap with a silver emblem of the dove descending. Sub-prefects wore blue ties with a silver dove emblem and a cap trimmed with silver cord, while full prefects wore a blue tie with a gold dove emblem. Full prefects also had a silver tassel on their school caps.

=== Motto ===
The school motto was, Spiritum Nolite Extinguere, (Never extinguish the Spirit), which was also the title of the school song.

== Activities ==
Not all boys at the school lived in Basingstoke. After World War II students came by bus from as far away as Whitchurch and Tadley.

For some years there was a Young Farmers' Club that attracted boys with a rural background.

During the winter and spring terms, the school played rugby, football, hockey, and basketball; in summer, the sports were cricket, lawn tennis, and athletics, as well as swimming in the unheated open-air swimming pool.

There was a Combined Cadet Force, (CCF), with a small field gun and ex-British Army Lee–Enfield SMLE No.4 0.303 rifles stored fairly securely on the premises, together with Bren guns. The army section also had a 2-inch mortar and 3.5-inch rocket launcher, together with six Sten guns. The RAF section of the Combined Cadet Force had access to a catapult-launched single seat training glider.

After World War II the school produced an annual Shakespeare play, under the direction of the English master, Mr J.H.C. Byrnes, until his retirement. One year they toured schools in Denmark with "The Merchant of Venice". Byrnes's final production of Hamlet, presented at the school in 1963, toured to Denmark and Sweden in the summer of 1964. Brian Theodore Ralph in the eponymous role went on to study at the Guildhall School of Music and Drama and enjoyed a successful career in the theatre.

Also after World War II the school maintained a symphony orchestra and gave public performances under the direction of the modern languages master, Mr Dennis R. Stephens (who had a M.A. in Fine Arts from Oxford). After his retirement, Mr Stephens recalled that "it was a happy school".

The number of boys in the school, in the last years of its separate existence, was about 650, with three forms of entrance, each of about 20–25 children per class. Their numbers had doubled since the end of the War. Pupils took "O" Levels at the age of 16, and those who stayed on into the Sixth Form, took "A" Levels at the age of 18. Latin was taught to all Junior boys; Ancient Greek was still taught in the Sixth Form, although to a very small number of pupils, as of the academic year 1967–68. French and German were regularly taught too.

== Former teachers ==
The school had two refugee-teachers: Miss Strauss, from Vienna, who taught Latin, and Mr. Hermann, a liberal-minded German. In 1960-64 the music master was Ernest Warburton who later became editor of music at the BBC.

The last headmaster, Mr W.H. Rhodes M.A. (Oxon.) (c. 1924–2005)^{1} and the last deputy-headmaster, Mr. J. J. Evans M.A. (Cantab.) had both been classics masters. The music master, Mr. Peter Marchbank M.A. (Cantab.), left the school in 1969, to take up a career in conducting and radio broadcasting with the BBC in Manchester. The senior geography teacher, Mr. Eric G. Stokes, had had a notable wartime RAF career, having gained, amongst other decorations, the Distinguished Flying Cross and bar, and attaining the rank of wing commander. Mr Stokes became the school archivist with Ron Crossman, an RE teacher and former head boy of the School. A chemistry teacher, George Holmes O.B.E., was an A.C.F. full colonel. He had been awarded the Cadet Forces Medal and the Special Constabulary Long Service Medal, with a number of clasps.

== Merger with Charles Chute School ==
In September 1970, as part of the programme to make most UK maintained schools comprehensive, and abolish 11+ selection, Queen Mary's School merged with the Charles Chute Secondary Modern School, a secondary modern school which had been built next door. The combined schools became known initially as Queen Mary's and Charles Chute School. The first headmaster of the combined school was Wilfred Harry Rhodes, who was the last headmaster of Queen Mary's School for Boys. The name of the comprehensive school was later changed to The Vyne School, latterly becoming The Vyne Community School, which remains to this day a co-educational maintained school for the 11–16 age group. The "Queen Mary's" name was transferred to the 16–18 Sixth Form College in Cliddesden Road, Basingstoke, Queen Mary's College.

== Notable alumni ==
- John Arlott, a national celebrity as a BBC radio and television cricket commentator, who spoke with a slow, carefully controlled voice, noted for its Hampshire accent
- Gordon Coppuck, racing car designer
- John Freeman Dunn, Liberal MP 1923-1924 for Hemel Hempstead
- Paul Hockings, author, filmmaker, and professor emeritus of anthropology at the University of Illinois
- John James (c 1673 – 15 May 1746), architect
- Martin Read, chairman of the Senior Salaries Review Body and Wincanton plc
- Revd. Gilbert White (1720–1793), village parson and pioneer naturalist
- George Wigg, an Army officer, later a Labour MP, junior minister, and a life peer
- Alderman George W. Willis, founder of the Willis Museum and a one-time mayor of Basingstoke. [4]
