= Henry Tyndale School =

Location
- Ship Lane; Farnborough; Hampshire, GU14 8BX; England
- Coordinates: 51.30228°N 0.74464°W

Information
- Type: Community special school
- Local authority: Hampshire
- Department for Education URN: 131559 Tables
- Ofsted: Reports
- Headteacher: Rob Thompson
- Gender: Co-educational
- Age: 2 to 19
- Website: http://www.henrytyndale.hants.sch.uk/

Henry Tyndale School is a special school located in Farnborough, Hampshire, England, catering for pupils of all academic ages (2-19). The main building accommodates 100 pupils up to Year 11, with a further 15 pupils in a purpose-built Sixth form college.

== OFSTED inspections ==
In May 2009, following a periodic Ofsted inspection, the school received an "Outstanding" assessment, building on the assessment of "Good with Outstanding Features" in 2006.

In December 2011, the "Outstanding" assessment was confirmed.

== Awards ==
- Enhanced Healthy Schools Status (July 2009)

In addition, the school is working towards

- Sing Up - Silver Award

=== South and South East in Bloom - School Grounds ===
- 2009 - Gold Award and Overall Winner
- 2008 - Gold Award
