= Lévignen =

- Commune
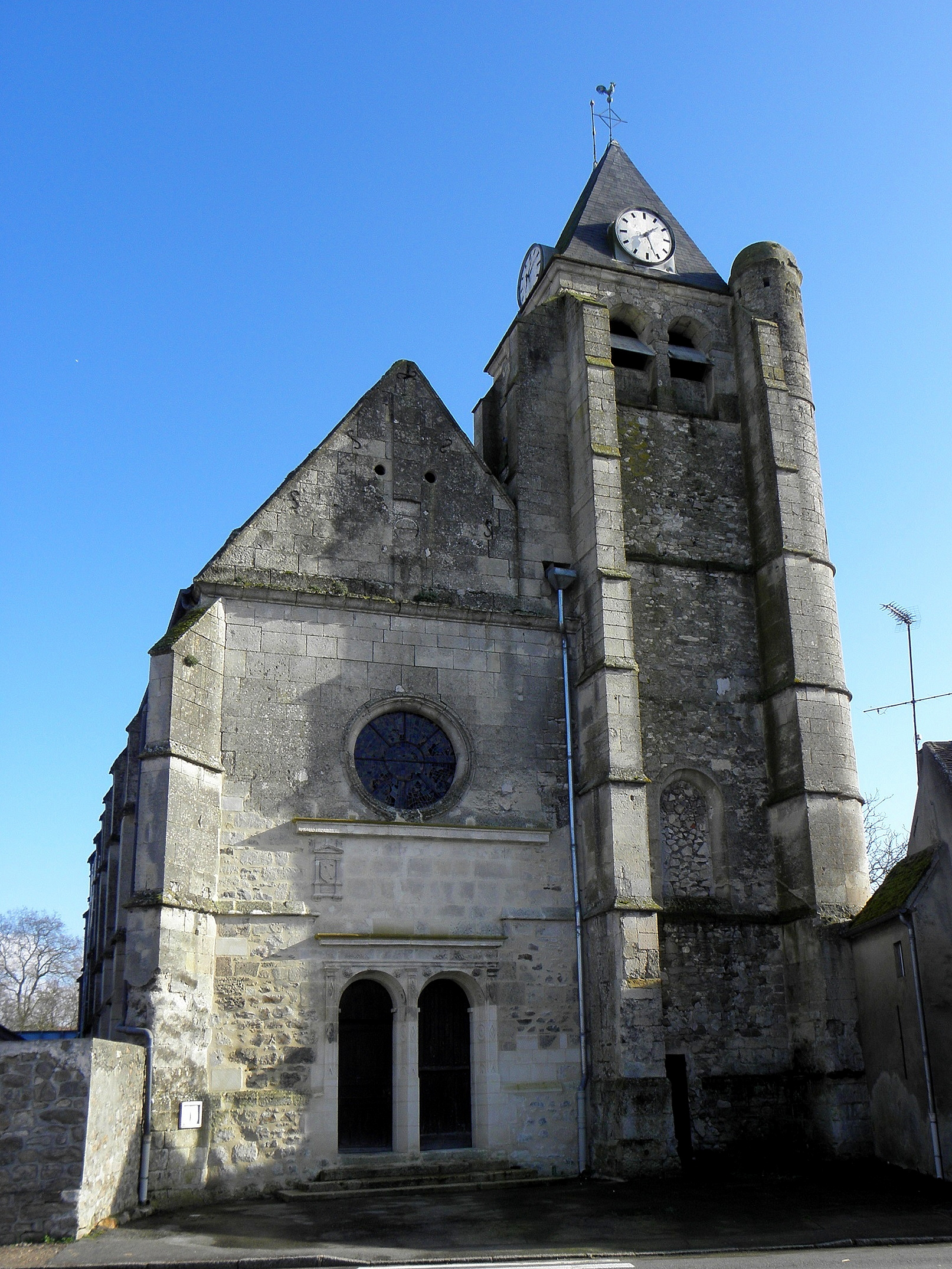
- The church in Lévignen
- Location of Lévignen
- Location within France Location within Hauts-de-France
- Coordinates: 49°11′52″N 2°54′54″E
- Country: France
- Region: Hauts-de-France
- Department: Oise
- Arrondissement: Senlis
- Canton: Nanteuil-le-Haudouin
- Intercommunality: Pays de Valois

Government
  - Mayor (2020–2026): Christophe Germain
- Area^{1}: 13.9 km^{2} (5.4 sq mi)
- Elevation: 111 m (364 ft)
- Highest elevation: 156 m (512 ft)
- Lowest elevation: 98 m (322 ft)
- Population (2023): 1,014
  - Density: 72.9/km^{2} (189/sq mi)
- Time zone: UTC+01:00 (CET)
  - Summer (DST): UTC+02:00 (CEST)
- INSEE/Postal code: 60358 /60800
- ^{1} French Land Register data, which excludes lakes, ponds, glaciers > 1 km^{2} (0.386 sq mi or 247 acres) and river estuaries.

Lévignen (French pronunciation: [leviɲɑ̃]) is a commune in the Oise department in northern France.

== International relations ==
Lévignen is twinned with:

- Crookham Village, United Kingdom

== See also ==
- Communes of the Oise department
