= Robert Kirby-Harris =

British physicist

- Born: 12 June 1952 (age 74)
- Education: University of Kent; Lancaster University
- Known for: Chief Executive of the Institute of Physics 2005–2012
- Scientific career
- Fields: Physics
- Workplaces: Royal Navy (1977–1985)

Bob Kirby-Harris (born 12 June 1952) is a former Secretary General of the International Union of Pure and Applied Physics and Chief Executive of the Institute of Physics.

== Early life ==
Harris went to Ashford Grammar School (now The Norton Knatchbull School.) He gained a 1st Class BSc in Theoretical Physics in 1973 from the University of Kent. In 1947 at Clare College, Cambridge, he gained an MA in Applied Maths and Theoretical Physics. From the University of Sussex he gained a PGCE (Secondary schools) in 1975. From Plymouth Polytechnic he gained a DMS in 1985. From Lancaster University he gained a PhD in Higher Education Policy in 2003.

== Career ==
=== School teacher ===
He was a school teacher from 1975 to 1977 at Wakeford School (now called Havant Academy) in Havant, Hampshire.

=== Royal Navy ===
In 1977 he joined the Royal Navy becoming an instructor and a Lieutenant Commander in 1982. From 1977 to 1979 he was a lecturer in Maths and Electronics at the Royal Navy Weapons Engineering School at Fareham (HMS Collingwood). From 1980 to 1983 he was based at Chatham, and from 1983 to 1985 he was a Senior Maths Lecturer at the Royal Naval Engineering College (RNEC Manadon) at Plymouth.

=== Academic administration ===
He has previous held posts as university manager at Middlesex University and the University of Namibia.

Since 2008 he has been the Secretary General of the International Union of Pure and Applied Physics. He was Chief Executive of the Institute of Physics between 2005 and 2012.

== Personal life ==
In 1979 he married Abigail Mee and they have two sons.
