= Test Valley School =

Danebury School
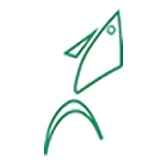

Location
- Roman Road; Stockbridge, Hampshire, SO20 6HA; England; 51.1134°N 1.50233°W

Information
- Type: Community School
- Motto: Kindness, Excellence, Resilience & Empowerment
- Established: 1961
- Local authority: Hampshire
- Department for Education URN: 116426 Tables
- Ofsted: Reports
- Executive Headteacher: Jo McKeown
- Head of School: Nikki Goodridge
- Gender: Coeducational
- Age: 11 to 16
- Houses: Griffin, Phoenix, centur
- Colour: Blue
- Website: https://www.danebury.hispmat.org/

Danebury School (previously Test Valley School) is a comprehensive secondary school located in Stockbridge, Hampshire, England. Due to its rural location, it has a wide catchment area, with significant numbers of students travelling from Andover, Wherwell, Romsey, The Wallops and other small villages near to Stockbridge.

The school is a member of the HISP Multi-Academy Trust, having joined on 1 February 2024. The school was renamed to Danebury School upon joining the trust.

== Exam Results ==
5 GCSEs at A*–C: 64% (2012)

5 GCSEs at A*–C: 69% (2014)

5 GCSEs at A*–C: 67% (2015)

In 2018, 57% of pupils achieved 5 or more 9–4 grades, compared to a 60% national average. 38% of pupils achieved grade 5 (a strong pass) in both maths and English, compared to a 40% national average.

== Ofsted ==
In 2022, the school was rated Inadequate in all categories by Ofsted. Since then, there has been a change in headship with the previous Headteacher, Caroline Lowing, leaving the school and Nikki Goodridge replacing her. The school has since undertaken School Improvement work with the assistance of the academy trust.
