= St Nicholas' School, Hampshire =

St Nicholas' School

Location
- Redfields Lane; Fleet, Hampshire, GU52 0RF; England; 51.2502°N 0.8531°W

Information
- Type: Private day school
- Religious affiliation: Church of England
- Established: 1935
- Local authority: Hampshire
- Department for Education URN: 116518 Tables
- Chair of Governors: Stephen Mellor
- Headmistress: Olwen Wright
- Gender: Girls
- Age: 3 to 16
- Enrolment: 370~
- Website: st-nicholas.hants.sch.uk

St Nicholas' School is a private day school for girls in Church Crookham, a village at the southern edge of Fleet, Hampshire, England. The school educates girls from the age of 3 to 16, and boys from age 3 to 7.

== History ==
St Nicholas' School was founded in 1935 and moved to its present 30-acre site in 1996. As the school grew, the original Victorian house has been extended, adapted and additional accommodation built. The school became a charitable trust in 1966. The school maintains the Christian ethos of its foundation, whilst welcoming pupils of all faiths and of none.
