= The Vyne Community School =

Location
- Vyne Road; Basingstoke, Hampshire, RG21 5PB; England; 51.2740°N 1.08908°W

Information
- Type: Comprehensive; Community School
- Established: 1970
- Local authority: Hampshire
- Department for Education URN: 116440 Tables
- Ofsted: Reports
- Gender: Coeducational
- Age: 11 to 16
- Website: http://www.vyne.hants.sch.uk

The Vyne Community School is a coeducational community school in Basingstoke, England for young people aged 11–16, and still occupies the site of the former Queen Mary's School for Boys, in Vyne Road, Basingstoke. It is a specialist school for the Performing Arts.

== History ==
The school was created out of the merger of two pre-existing schools, Queen Mary's School for Boys, Basingstoke a selective grammar school, also known as QMSB, and Charles Chute Secondary Modern School, which occurred in 1970. Initially the school was known as Queen Mary's & Charles Chute School, and was the result of the U.K. Government's policy in the 1960s to make all maintained (state funded) schools comprehensive. In the first instance the school remained a single sex institution, becoming coeducational in 1971–72. The name "Queen Mary's" was later transferred to the Queen Mary's College, a Sixth Form College, in Cliddesden Road, Basingstoke. The school was thereupon renamed The Vyne School, in commemoration of the links that both schools had to The Vyne, a property owned by the National Trust for Places of Historic Interest or Natural Beauty, former home of the Sandys and Chute families, just north of Basingstoke.

In 1997 The School was used as a filming location in the LGBT Coming of age film Get Real (film).

== Facilities ==
The Vyne is the only school in Basingstoke to have a Combined Cadet Force (CCF).

== Notable alumni ==
- Kit Symons - Professional association football manager and former Welsh international footballer. Former manager of Crystal Palace, Colchester United and Fulham.
- Steve Hewlett - Professional ventriloquist and Britain's Got Talent finalist.
- Monty Don - British broadcaster and lead presenter of the BBC gardening television series Gardeners' World since 2003.
