= Southlands School =

Location
- Southlands School; Vicar's Hill, Boldre, Lymington, Hampshire, S041 5QB; England
- Coordinates: 50°46′28″N 1°32′23″W

Information
- Type: Independent Specialist School (Unapproved) and Children’s Home
- Religious affiliation: None
- Established: 1971
- Local authority: Hampshire County Council
- Department for Education URN: 116564 Tables
- Ofsted: Reports
- Principal: Alison Priddle
- Proprietor: Cambian Asperger Syndrome Service Limited
- Gender: Mixed
- Age: 7 to 19
- Enrolment: 37
- Capacity: 64
- Website: https://www.cambiangroup.com/specialist-education/our-schools/asperger-schools/southlands-school/

Southlands School is a specialist school and children's home, located in the parish of Boldre, near Lymington, Hampshire, England. Established in 1971, as an independent school, it currently operates under the Cambian Group.

On 12 May 1987 Southlands, historically known as Vicars Hill House, became a grade II listed building.

In 1995, Southlands established itself as the first residential specialist school in the United Kingdom for students with a diagnosis of Asperger syndrome. In 2014, after expanding its residential provisions, Southlands registered as a children's home.

Since its withdrawal from approval as an independent specialist school under section 41 of the Children and Families Act 2014, the school can no longer be subject to a request for it to be named in an Education, Health and Care plan.

== Controversies ==
In September 2019, the school was examined by the Independent Inquiry into Child Sexual Abuse; the school's children's home was later judged as 'Inadequate' by Ofsted.

In July 2022, an English teacher at the school was banned from teaching indefinitely after she was accused of failing to maintain professional boundaries. The teacher had asked to be alone with a pupil and had contacted the pupil's mother under the pseudonym Tom Jones.
