= Baycroft School =

Special school in Hampshire, England

Coordinates: 50.8217°N 1.2053°W

Information
- Department for Education URN: 116617 Tables
- Ofsted: Reports
- Head teacher: Marijke Miles
- Gender: Mixed
- Age: 11 to 16
- Enrollment: 193 (2025 )
- Capacity: 150
- Website: www.baycroftschool.com

Baycroft School is a special needs secondary school in Stubbington, Hampshire, England, near Fareham and Gosport. Baycroft School is a day, community special school for secondary-aged students, who experience learning difficulties and autism.

Baycroft School is in partnership with the Pioneer Teaching Alliance to raise standards and to help students in the local community.
