= Havant Academy =

Location
- Wakefords Way; Leigh Park; Havant, Hampshire, PO9 5JD; England
- Coordinates: 50.8763°N 0.9706°W

Information
- Type: Academy
- Motto: Ready, Respectful, Safe
- Department for Education URN: 136156 Tables
- Ofsted: Reports
- Head teacher: Vicki Dillon-Thiselton
- Gender: Mixed
- Age: 11 to 16
- Houses: Loyalty, Ambition, Unity, Respect
- Website: http://www.havant-tkat.org/

Havant Academy is a mixed secondary school located in the Leigh Park area of Havant in the English county of Hampshire. The school is situated at the edge of Staunton Country Park.

== History ==
Previously known as Wakeford Comprehensive School and latterly Staunton Park Community School, it gained specialist Sports College status and was renamed Staunton Community Sports College. It then became a foundation school administered by Hampshire County Council. The school converted to academy status on 1 September 2010 and was renamed Havant Academy, becoming the first academy in Hampshire. It is sponsored by the Kemnal Academies Trust (TKAT).

In 2013, Ofsted stated that "The academy is making reasonable progress towards the removal of special measures." Havant Academy was rated 'Good' in most aspects in its Ofsted report of June 2015.

As of February 2025, Havant Academy has declined into being 'Inadequate' once again in Ofsted standards.

== Qualification Offerings ==
Havant Academy offers GCSEs, BTECs and other vocational courses as programmes of study for pupils.

== Notable former pupils ==
- Graham Stokes, music executive and musician

== Notable former staff ==
- Robert Kirby-Harris, Secretary General of the International Union of Pure and Applied Physics
