= Coppice Spring Academy =

The Coppice Spring Academy

Location
- Pack Lane; Basingstoke, Hampshire, RG22 5TH; England
- Coordinates: 51.2489°N 1.1207°W

Information
- Type: Special school; Academy
- Trust: Catch22 Multi Academies Trust
- Department for Education URN: 141187 Tables
- Ofsted: Reports
- Headteacher: David O'Neill
- Gender: Coeducational
- Age: 11 to 16
- Website: https://www.thecoppicespringacademy.org.uk/

The Coppice Spring Academy (formerly Grangeside School) is a coeducational secondary school located in Basingstoke for students with behavioural, emotional and social difficulties (BESD). This includes students with learning difficulties, attention deficit and hyperactive disorders, and compulsive disorders. In January 2016 there were 53 students on roll of which 40 were boys; the school takes students from the whole of Hampshire. It has 13 full-time teachers and 6 support assistants.

== History ==
Coppice Spring School was formerly known as Basingstoke School Plus. Before its name change (to Grangeside School) it had been beset by problems, involving an Ofsted rating of "unsatisfactory" in 2006. Results improved under a temporary headteacher but when it became a secondary school in 2010 a new headteacher had to be appointed. However, in 2011 a further Ofsted inspection revealed severe deficiencies, notably in quality of teaching, student performance and attendance, and the school was given a Notice to Improve. In 2012 the school was inspected again and little improvement was found as students were "either ... not attending lessons or too much teaching is inadequate. When students are in school, some miss lessons or refuse to undertake the work set for them ... (their) behaviour is inadequate overall". The school was therefore placed into special measures. The headteacher of the school left after this report and was replaced with the current incumbent. In June 2013 a monitoring report suggested that improvements had been made, although not enough to remove the school from its category.

In 2014, Grangeside School converted to academy status and was renamed to Coppice Spring Academy.

== Qualifications ==
Students study the standard National Curriculum and where appropriate are entered for GCSEs or equivalent qualifications. For the most recent results available (2012), 7% of students achieved the standard level of 5 GCSE equivalents including Maths and English, although 50% gained five or more GCSE or equivalent passes and 86% achieved at least one qualification.
