= Everest Community Academy =

Location
- Oxford Way; Basingstoke, Hampshire, RG24 9UP; England; 51.2852°N 1.0974°W

Information
- Type: Academy
- Established: 2007
- Department for Education URN: 145125 Tables
- Ofsted: Reports
- Principal: Alison Reid
- Gender: Coeducational
- Age: 11 to 16
- Website: www.everestcommunityacademy.org

Everest Community Academy is a coeducational secondary school with academy status, in Basingstoke, Hampshire. The school is part of the Bourne Education Trust. Everest is one of ten secondary schools serving Basingstoke and Deane.

== School history ==
The school was previously called John Hunt of Everest School. It moved site to a new building and changed name in 2007.

The Headteacher from 2007, and from the opening of the school as an academy in 2011, was Julie Rose. She left in 2014 and was succeeded by Nick Price who led the school for 3 years until 2017. Alex Russell oversaw the school until 2018 when Hannah Dibden took over. Mary Rome became interim headteacher in 2023.

When plans were announced to turn the predecessor school into an academy under the sponsorship of Academies Enterprise Trust (AET) there was local opposition, including a petition against the proposal signed by 400 parents. The local authority gave £27m in order to rebuild the school.

In summer 2017 Everest Community Academy was re-brokered by the Regional Schools Commissioner and left AET to become part of the Bourne Education Trust.

== Ofsted inspections ==
As of 2020, the school's most recent inspection by Ofsted was in February 2020, with an outcome of Good.

== Admissions ==
The school's pupil admissions number is 150 per year group.

== Facilities ==
The school was a new build in 2007 with modern sports and performing arts facilities. It shares the site with a leisure centre.
