= Eastleigh College =

College in Hampshire, UK

Coordinates: 50.962°N 1.359°W

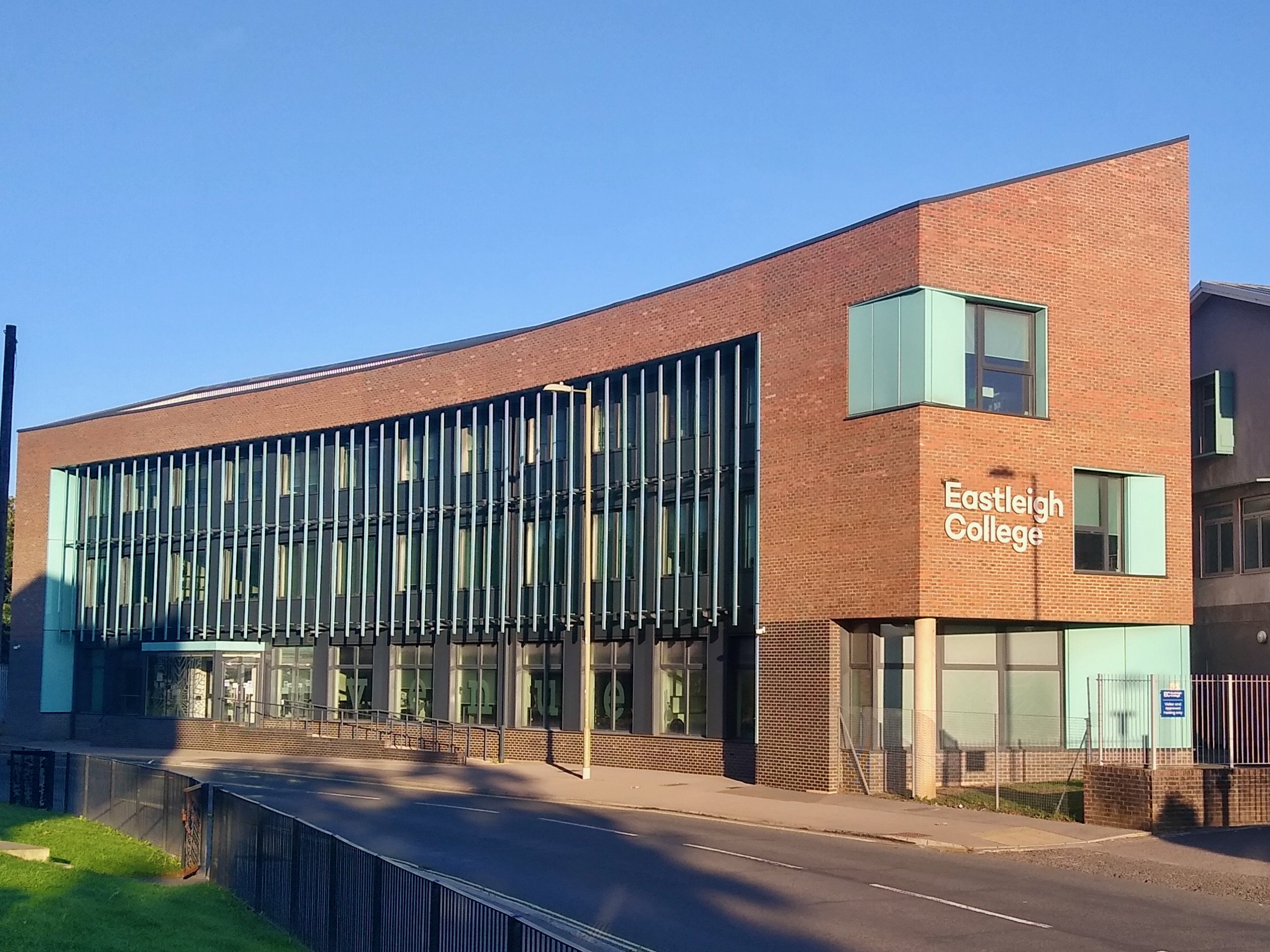
- Type: Further education
- Established: Over 50 years
- Chief Executive and Principal: Paul Cox
- Students: 22,000 students
- Location: Eastleigh, England
- Campus: Chestnut Avenue, Eastleigh
- Website: www.eastleigh.ac.uk

Eastleigh College in Eastleigh, Hampshire is a further education college providing technical and professional training and apprenticeships to school leavers, in addition to part-time professional courses and part-time leisure courses for adults.

With over 9,000 apprentices in learning, the college was ranked the best in Hampshire for learner achievement (and within the top 10 FE and Sixth Form colleges nationally), and named the third largest college provider of adult apprenticeships in England.

In 2018 the college was criticised for sub-contracting much of its provision.

In 2018 a merger between Eastleigh College and Southampton City College was announced but fell through last minute. A consultation on another merger between the two colleges together with Fareham College was launched in March 2023, with the merger proceeding in August that year to form the South Hampshire College Group.

== Campus ==
The college has recently undergone a £12 million redevelopment project, which includes a new training kitchen and professional restaurant for Catering students; new facilities for Art, Design & Media; new training salons and a commercial Hair & Beauty Salon for Hair and Beauty students; and a new Advanced Technology Centre with facilities for Computer Science, Construction and Engineering.

== Ofsted judgements ==
Ofsted inspected Eastleigh College four times between the introduction of the four point scale (Outstanding, Good, Satisfactory / Requires Improvement, Inadequate) in 2005 and the merger in 2023. The results of these inspections were Good in 2006, Outstanding in 2012, Good again in 2018 and Requires Improvement in 2022.
