= Osborne School, Winchester =

Coordinates: 51.071345°N 1.317930°W

Osborne School
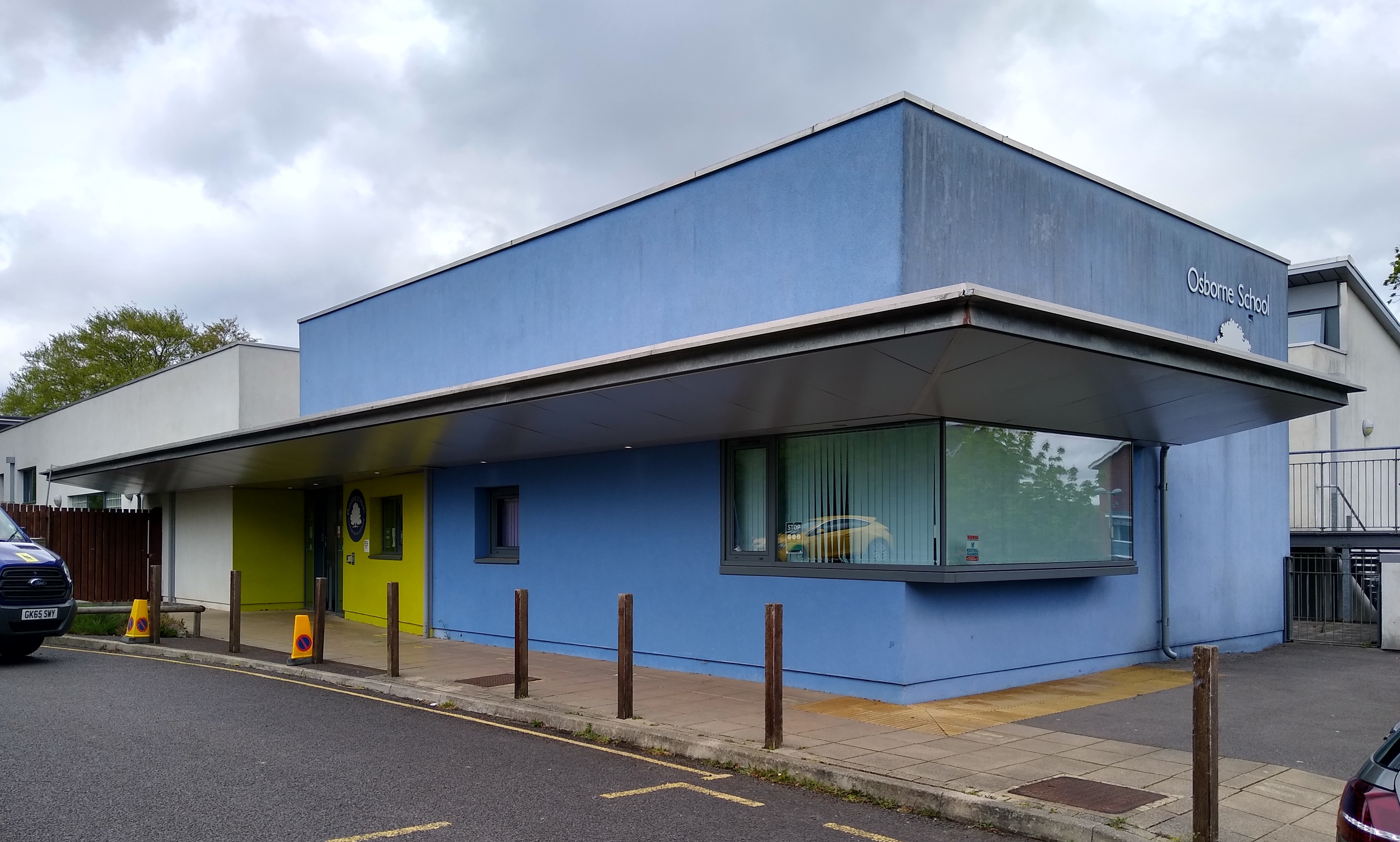

Location
- Athelstan Road; Winchester, Hampshire, SO23 7GA; England

Information
- Type: Community special school
- Motto: "Opportunities In Learning"
- Established: 2004
- Local authority: Hampshire
- Department for Education URN: 116511 Tables
- Ofsted: Reports
- Headteacher: Sonia White (née O'Donnell)
- Gender: Mixed
- Age: 11 to 19
- Enrolment: 217 as of June 2025
- Website: https://osborneschoolwinchester.com/

Osborne School is a community special school in Winchester, England. The school has 16 classes in the main school. The residential unit, which had 2 classes for pupils aged 16 and over, was converted in 2016 to a day service with a total of 7 classrooms and a light and sound room. Each class has up to 12 pupils and has support from at least 1 Learning Support Assistant, in addition to the class teacher. The school receives support from a speech and language therapy service and an occupational therapy service. The school also uses a music therapist and physiotherapy. It has a specialised unit for pupils on the autistic spectrum.

== History ==
In September 2003, the school was created after the closure and amalgamation of two schools for learners with moderate learning difficulties and children with severe learning difficulties.

In November 2015 the school's band "Rubik's Cube" performed at the Youth Prom in the Royal Albert Hall.
