= Farnborough, Hampshire =

Town in Hampshire, England

Coordinates: 51°17′N 0°45′W

Farnborough
- Town
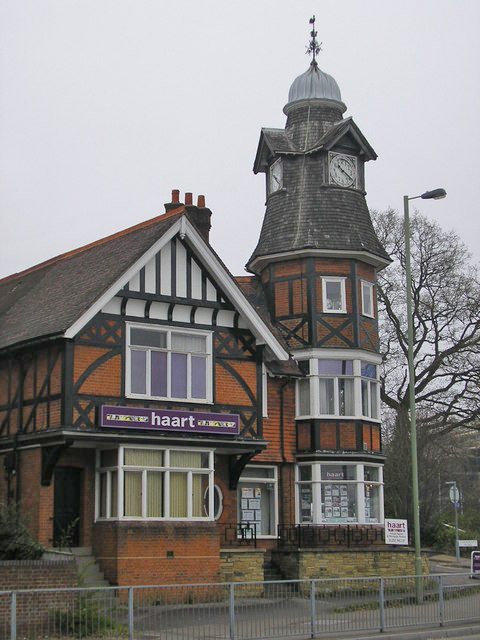
- Clock Tower

- Location within Hampshire
- Population: 60,652
- OS grid reference: SU871554
- District: Rushmoor
- Shire county: Hampshire
- Region: South East
- Country: England
- Sovereign state: United Kingdom
- Post town: FARNBOROUGH
- Postcode district: GU14
- Dialling code: 01252, 01276
- Police: Hampshire and Isle of Wight
- Fire: Hampshire and Isle of Wight
- Ambulance: South East Coast
- UK Parliament: Aldershot

Farnborough is a town located in the Rushmoor district of Hampshire, England. It has a population of around 60,652 as of the 2021 census and is an important centre of aviation, engineering and technology. The town is probably best known for its association with aviation, including Samuel Cody, Farnborough Airport, the Farnborough International Airshow, Royal Aircraft Establishment and the Air Accidents Investigation Branch.

== History ==
=== Pre-history and early settlements ===
The earliest evidence of human settlement around Farnborough dates back thousands of years. Archaeologists have uncovered flint tools and other artefacts from the Mesolithic period, indicating the presence of hunter-gatherer communities in the area over 8,000 years ago. During the Neolithic period, the region saw increasing agricultural activity and the development of more permanent settlements. Excavations have revealed the remains of several prehistoric enclosures and barrows within the boundaries of modern-day Farnborough, suggesting it was home to thriving communities in the 4th-2nd millennia BC. The area continued to be inhabited throughout the Bronze Age and Iron Age, with hillforts, field systems and other archaeological evidence indicating the presence of larger, more organised settlements. One notable site is Caesar's Camp, an Iron Age hillfort, located just north of the modern town.

The Roman conquest of Britain in the 1st century AD brought major changes to the local landscape. The Devil's Highway, a key Roman road, passed through what is now Farnborough, linking the provincial capital of Calleva Atrebatum (modern-day Silchester) with the coastal port of Portus Adurni (Portchester). Numerous Roman artefacts and building remains have been discovered within the town, suggesting it was home to a small rural settlement during the Roman period.

=== Saxon Farnborough ===
Following the end of Roman rule in the early 5th century, the area was gradually absorbed into the emerging Anglo-Saxon kingdoms. The modern name Farnborough derives from the Old English "Ferneberga", meaning "fern-covered hill".

Farnborough is first recorded in the Domesday Book of 1086, where it is listed as a small hamlet within the larger manor of Crondall. At this time, the settlement was held by the Norman lord, Odin de Windesores, who owned 3 hides of land there. The Domesday entry suggests Farnborough was a relatively insignificant rural village in the late 11th century, with a population estimated at 50-100 people.

Over the following centuries, Farnborough remained a modest agricultural settlement, its economy based around subsistence farming, woodland management and small-scale industry. The manor passed through the hands of various noble families, including the de Farnborough and de Sherborne dynasties.

=== The rise of Farnborough ===
Farnborough began to grow and develop more rapidly from the late 18th century onwards, driven by improved transportation links and its proximity to the expanding metropolis of London. The construction of the London and South Western Railway in the 1830s, with a station at Farnborough, greatly enhanced the town's accessibility and connectivity. This, combined with its healthy climate and picturesque rural setting, attracted an influx of wealthy London commuters and helped transform Farnborough into more of a suburban residential area.

From 1830 to 1850, Farnborough's population grew from around 400 to over 800, as new housing developments and services were established to cater for the expanding middle-class community. The town's focal point shifted from the historic village core to the area around the railway station, with the construction of new churches, schools, shops and other amenities.

=== The aviation era arrives ===
The most transformative event in Farnborough's history came in 1905, when the Royal Engineers moved from Aldershot with their School of Ballooning, to use the open space of Laffan's Plain for development and trials. They were joined by Samuel Cody in 1906, who came to demonstrate his man-lifting kites; he persuaded them to let him build an aeroplane. Cody became the first person to fly in a powered aircraft in Great Britain in 1908. A full-scale replica of this Army Aeroplane No 1 now exists in a pavilion alongside the original Balloon School Headquarters building, now home to the Farnborough Air Sciences Trust (FAST) Aviation Museum.

With the growth of aircraft related activity, the Army Balloon Factory became the Royal Aircraft Factory under civilian control. In 1912, with the formation of the Royal Flying Corps, the headquarters of the Balloon School became the headquarters of the Royal Flying Corps and is now known as Trenchard House. The name of the Royal Aircraft Factory had to be changed in 1918, when the Royal Air Force was formed, becoming the Royal Aircraft Establishment (RAE). This led to Farnborough becoming a globally significant centre for aeronautical research and development.

The establishment of the RAE, and the influx of skilled engineers and technicians it brought, had a profound impact on Farnborough's subsequent growth and character. Major aerospace companies such as Supermarine, Handley Page and De Havilland were attracted to set up factories and facilities in the area, further cementing the town's reputation as a hub of British aviation.

In the decades following the Second World War, Farnborough continued to expand rapidly, with the development of major new business parks, light industrial estates and residential areas to accommodate the growing population. The town also became renowned globally as the host of the biennial Farnborough International Airshow, one of the world's largest and most important aerospace trade events.

== Geography and climate ==
=== Topography and geology ===
Farnborough is located in the north-eastern corner of the county of Hampshire, near to the border with Surrey. The town occupies a valley setting, with the main urban area situated between the River Blackwater to the east and higher ground to the west. The topography gradually rises from the valley floor, reaching a maximum elevation of around 90 metres (300 feet) above sea level on the fringes of the town.

Geologically, Farnborough lies on a foundation of London Clay, overlain by deposits of sandy and gravelly Bagshot Beds from the Eocene epoch. The town's soils are generally free-draining and infertile, which historically limited the agricultural potential of the land.

Farnborough forms part of the wider Blackwater Valley conurbation, which includes the neighbouring towns of Aldershot, Camberley, Yateley, Sandhurst and Frimley.

The only naturally occurring significant flowing water, within Farnborough, is Cove Brook.

=== Climate ===
Farnborough experiences a temperate oceanic climate (Köppen climate classification Cfb), typical of south-eastern England. Summers are generally warm and dry, with average daily high temperatures around 22 °C (72 °F). Winters are mild, with average highs of 8 °C (46 °F) and lows around 2 °C (36 °F).

Rainfall is normally distributed fairly evenly throughout the year, with an annual average of around 760 millimetres (30 in). The driest periods are usually April–May and the wettest are October–November. Snowfall occurs occasionally in winter, but heavy and prolonged snowstorms are uncommon due to the town's relatively low elevation and southern latitude.

The Met Office has a weather station at Farnborough Airport, which has been operating since 1914.

Climate data for South Farnborough (1991–2020)
Month	Jan	Feb	Mar	Apr	May	Jun	Jul	Aug	Sep	Oct	Nov	Dec	Year
Record high °C (°F)	15.1 (59.2)	18.9 (66.0)	22.8 (73.0)	27.3 (81.1)	32.2 (90.0)	32.2 (90.0)	36.0 (96.8)	36.2 (97.2)	31.7 (89.1)	27.8 (82.0)	19.4 (66.9)	15.6 (60.1)	36.2 (97.2)
Mean daily maximum °C (°F)	8.0 (46.4)	8.5 (47.3)	11.3 (52.3)	14.4 (57.9)	17.7 (63.9)	20.7 (69.3)	22.9 (73.2)	22.4 (72.3)	19.4 (66.9)	15.2 (59.4)	11.0 (51.8)	8.4 (47.1)	15.0 (59.0)
Daily mean °C (°F)	4.8 (40.6)	5.0 (41.0)	7.0 (44.6)	9.4 (48.9)	12.6 (54.7)	15.5 (59.9)	17.7 (63.9)	17.3 (63.1)	14.6 (58.3)	11.2 (52.2)	7.5 (45.5)	5.1 (41.2)	10.7 (51.3)
Mean daily minimum °C (°F)	1.6 (34.9)	1.4 (34.5)	2.7 (36.9)	4.4 (39.9)	7.5 (45.5)	10.4 (50.7)	12.5 (54.5)	12.2 (54.0)	9.7 (49.5)	7.3 (45.1)	4.0 (39.2)	1.9 (35.4)	6.3 (43.3)
Record low °C (°F)	−14.4 (6.1)	−16.7 (1.9)	−11.0 (12.2)	−6.7 (19.9)	−5.0 (23.0)	0.4 (32.7)	2.8 (37.0)	0.6 (33.1)	−1.1 (30.0)	−6.7 (19.9)	−9.4 (15.1)	−14.2 (6.4)	−16.7 (1.9)
Average precipitation mm (inches)	73.3 (2.89)	53.2 (2.09)	46.0 (1.81)	48.8 (1.92)	46.5 (1.83)	49.3 (1.94)	46.2 (1.82)	57.5 (2.26)	59.4 (2.34)	79.0 (3.11)	82.6 (3.25)	73.0 (2.87)	714.7 (28.14)
Average precipitation days (≥ 1.0 mm)	12.2	10.4	9.4	9.0	8.0	8.0	7.7	8.9	8.5	11.7	12.5	11.8	118.0
Mean monthly sunshine hours	52.3	74.5	120.1	171.1	196.6	188.8	211.6	195.3	149.0	109.9	64.7	55.0	1,588.9
Source 1: Met Office
Source 2: Starlings Roost Weather

== Governance ==
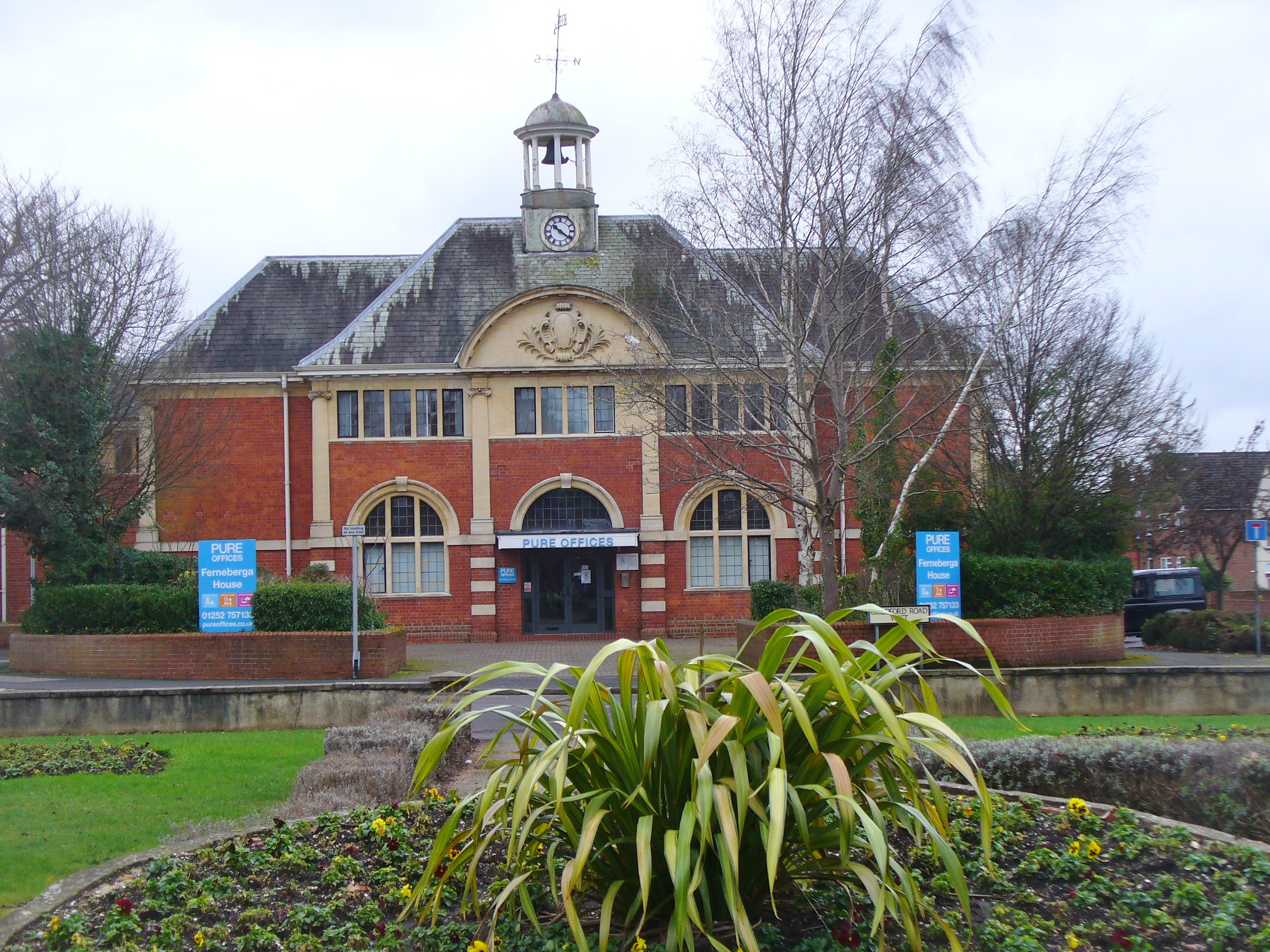
The former Farnborough Town Hall

=== Local government ===
Farnborough falls under the jurisdiction of Rushmoor Borough Council, the local government authority for the borough of the same name. The borough is divided into eight electoral wards, each represented by three councillors on the borough council.

At the time of writing, the Labour Party is in control of the council following significant gains in the May 2024 local elections.

=== National government ===
Farnborough lies within the Aldershot parliamentary constituency. Since the 2024 general election, the local Member of Parliament has been Alex Baker of the Labour Party.

=== Borough ===
Farnborough is part of the Borough of Rushmoor, along with Aldershot.

It contains eight wards, each with three elected borough councillors. Until 2011, there were nine wards; however, following the Electoral boundary reviews, Grange and Mayfield wards were merged to create Cherrywood ward.

=== County ===
Farnborough is represented on Hampshire County Council by three divisions, each with a single elected representative.

- Farnborough North: Roz Chadd (Conservative)
- Farnborough South: Adam Jackman (Conservative)
- Farnborough West: Rod Cooper (Conservative)

== Twin towns ==
Rushmoor is twinned with the following towns:

- Dayton, Ohio, United States (since 2019)
- Gorkha Municipality, Nepal (since 2020)
- Meudon, France (since 1974)
- Oberursel, Germany (since 1989)
- Rzeszów, Poland (since 2019)
- Sulechów, Poland (since 2001).

== Demography ==
=== Population ===
The table below shows the historical population growth of Farnborough since the early 19th century, based on census data:

19th Century		20th/21st Centuries	
Year	Population	Year	Population
1801	702	1901	2,383
1811	793	1911	3,464
1821	816	1921	4,232
1831	856	1931	5,447
1841	879	1951	7,760
1851	910	1961	11,277
1861	1,081	1971	16,608
1871	1,299	1981	24,721
1881	1,576	1991	33,896
1891	1,970	2001	50,020
		2011	57,486

=== Ethnic composition ===
According to the 2011 census, Farnborough's ethnic composition was:

- White: 87.2%
- Asian/Asian British: 7.9%
- Mixed/multiple ethnic groups: 2.6%
- Black/African/Caribbean/Black British: 1.3%
- Other ethnic groups: 0.9%.

The town has a lower proportion of ethnic minority residents compared to the national average for England, likely reflecting its historical demographic as a predominantly white suburban settlement. However, the data does indicate a gradual diversification of Farnborough's population in recent decades.

=== Languages ===
English is by far the most widely spoken language in Farnborough, with 90.3% of residents reporting it as their main language in the 2011 census. "Other languages" account for 8.1% of the population.

== Religion ==
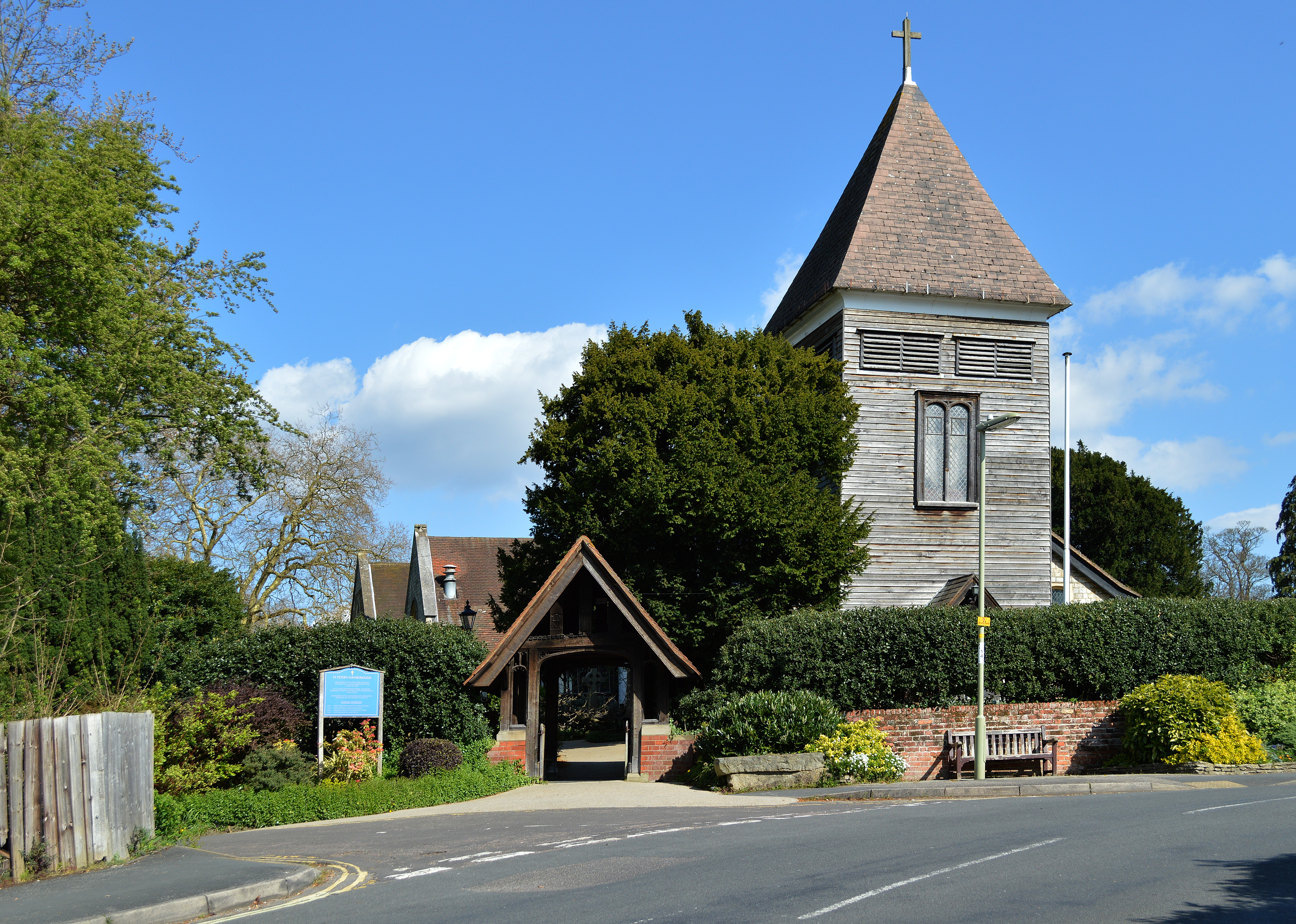
St Peter's Church, Farnborough

The Church of England has a significant presence in Farnborough, with several notable places of worship. The oldest is St Peter's Church, parts of which date back to the 12th century. The current building was largely reconstructed and expanded during the 19th century, though it retains some original medieval features.

In addition to St Peter's, other Anglican churches in the town include St Mark's, built in 1881, and the more modern St Martin's Church, consecrated in 1978.

The Roman Catholic faith also has a strong presence in Farnborough, centred around St Michael's Abbey. This imposing church and monastery complex was constructed in the late 19th century at the behest of the Empress Eugénie, widow of Napoleon III, who lived in the town. St Michael's Abbey is home to a community of Benedictine monks and serves as a pilgrimage site, housing the tombs of Napoleon III and the Prince Imperial.

In addition to the Christian denominations, Farnborough is also home to a small Muslim community centred around an Islamic centre established in the late 20th century. There are no purpose-built mosques within the town itself, though proposals for new facilities have been the subject of local controversy and planning disputes over the years.

== Economy and employment ==
=== Economic profile and trends ===
Farnborough has a relatively prosperous and affluent economic profile compared to many other parts of the UK. Data from the 2011 census shows that the town has a higher than average proportion of residents employed in managerial, professional and technical occupations.

The median annual household income in Farnborough was estimated at £47,000 as of 2020, significantly above the national average. This reflects the town's high concentration of well-paid jobs in the aerospace, technology and financial services sectors.

Unemployment rates in Farnborough have historically been low, averaging around 3-4% in recent years, compared to national figures of 4-5%. The town also has a highly skilled workforce, with over 40% of residents holding degree-level qualifications or above.

However, like many town centres across the UK, Farnborough has experienced some challenges in recent years when it comes to the health of its traditional retail sector. The rise of on-line shopping and changing consumer habits have led to increasing vacancy rates and declining footfall in the town's main shopping areas.

In response, Rushmoor Borough Council has developed plans for a major redevelopment of Farnborough's town centre. This £100 million+ project, set to be delivered over the coming decade, aims to transform the retail and leisure offer, with the construction of new cinema, restaurant and residential units. The goal is to reposition the town centre as a more vibrant, mixed-use destination that can better adapt to the evolving retail landscape.

=== Sustainability and the environment ===
The town was designed as a Clean Air Zone in 2021, which introduced stricter emissions standards for vehicles entering the area. This forms part of a broader strategy by Rushmoor Borough Council to improve local air quality and reduce Farnborough's carbon footprint.

== Transport ==
=== Railway ===
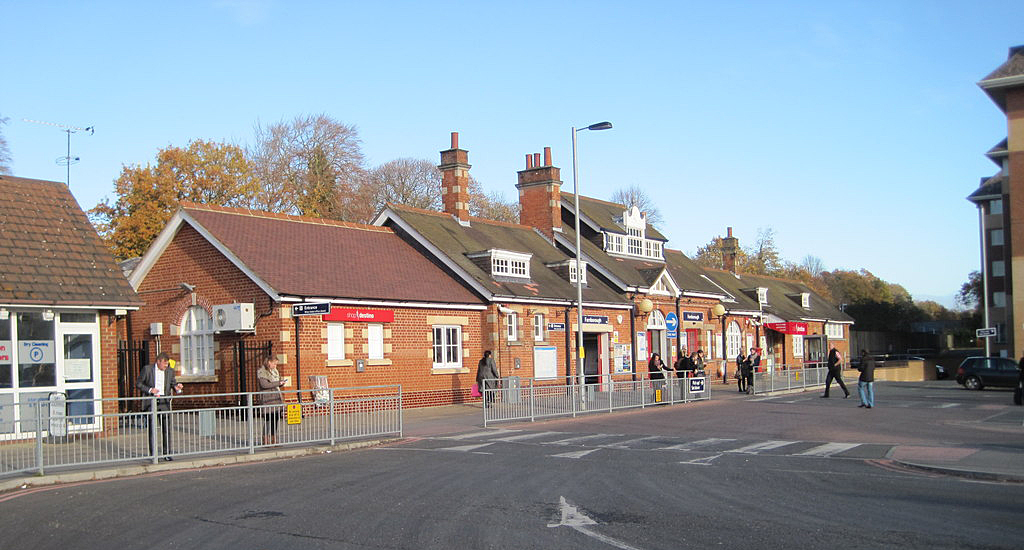
Farnborough Main's station building

Farnborough has two railway stations:

- Farnborough (Main) is the busier of the two, situated in the town centre. South Western Railway operates services on the South West Main Line between London Waterloo and Basingstoke.
- Farnborough North is a stop on the North Downs Line. Great Western Railway runs services linking Reading and Gatwick Airport.

Journey times from Farnborough to London Waterloo range from around 35 minutes to 55 minutes, depending on the service. Connections to other major centres like Reading, Guildford and Aldershot are also available, though some routes may require a change of train.

The town's rail links have been criticised by some residents and local leaders as being relatively slow and inconvenient compared to other commuter towns in the South East. A 2017 infrastructure assessment commissioned by Rushmoor Borough Council noted that many Farnborough residents choose to drive to faster rail stations like Brookwood, Farnborough (Main) and Sunningdale to access quicker services to London.

=== Buses ===
Bus services are operated predominantly by Stagecoach South, with routes connecting the town to Aldershot, Camberley, Cove, Frimley and Southwood.

=== Roads ===
Farnborough is near to several arterial routes serving the South of England:

- The M3 motorway runs along the northern edge of Farnborough, with junctions 4 and 4a providing access to the town.
- The A325 runs north–south through the centre of the town, connecting it to neighbouring Aldershot to the south and Frimley to the north. The A331 Blackwater Valley Relief Road links Farnborough to the wider Blackwater Valley area, including Camberley and Yateley.
- Other roads serving the town include the A30, which runs parallel to the M3 and provides an alternative route to London and the west, and the B3411 and B3015 which link the town to surrounding villages and settlements.

=== Air ===
Farnborough has air transport connections centred on Farnborough Airport. It is a business aviation hub, catering primarily to charter flights rather than scheduled commercial passenger services. It hosts the biennial Farnborough International Airshow, one of the world's largest aerospace trade events.

It also serves as the home of the Air Accidents Investigation Branch, the UK's specialist air accident investigation authority.

Heathrow Airport, the UK's busiest international hub, is around 18 miles (29 km) to the north-east, while Gatwick Airport is approximately 25 miles (40 km) to the east. Both can be accessed via the nearby M3 motorway.

=== Active travel ===
Farnborough has made efforts in recent years to improve sustainable transport options for residents, with initiatives to promote walking, cycling and public bus services.

A network of cycleways and shared pedestrian/cycle paths has been developed, including a £1.2 million route linking Blackwater station to the Watchmoor business park. Additionally, a new secure bike storage facility was opened in the town centre in 2021 to encourage active travel.

== Education ==
=== Primary and secondary schools ===
The town's primary schools include Cove, Bohunt, St Peter’s CofE Junior School and St Patrick's Catholic Primary Schools.

At the secondary level, Farnborough is home to three non-selective, co-educational comprehensive schools: Cove, Bohunt and The Wavell Schools.

In addition to these state-maintained schools, Farnborough also has two independent Roman Catholic secondary schools: Farnborough Hill (girls' school) and Salesian College (boys' school). Both of these selective, single-sex institutions offer education up to sixth form level.

=== Further and higher education ===
Farnborough is home to two prominent further education institutions:

- The Sixth Form College, Farnborough, is a large state-funded sixth form college that draws students from across the local area. It offers a wide range of A-level, vocational and technical qualifications, with around 4,000 enrolments annually. The college was classified as Outstanding by Ofsted in 2021, and regularly achieves above-average results at A-level and has new facilities for subjects such as creative arts, science and sport.
- Farnborough College of Technology specialises in further education for students aged 16–18 as well as higher education programmes for adults. The college has strong connections to industry, providing vocational qualifications across various technical fields in association with awarding bodies. It is designated as a Centre of Vocational Excellence (CoVE) and has expertise in aerospace, digital technologies and construction. Farnborough College operates from a 100-acre campus, with facilities including engineering workshops, computer suites and a wind tunnel.

In collaboration with the University of Surrey, Farnborough College also runs the University Centre Farnborough which offers foundation degrees and full bachelor's degrees in subjects like project management, cyber security and paramedic science. The centre has its own learning resource centre.

== Sport and recreation ==
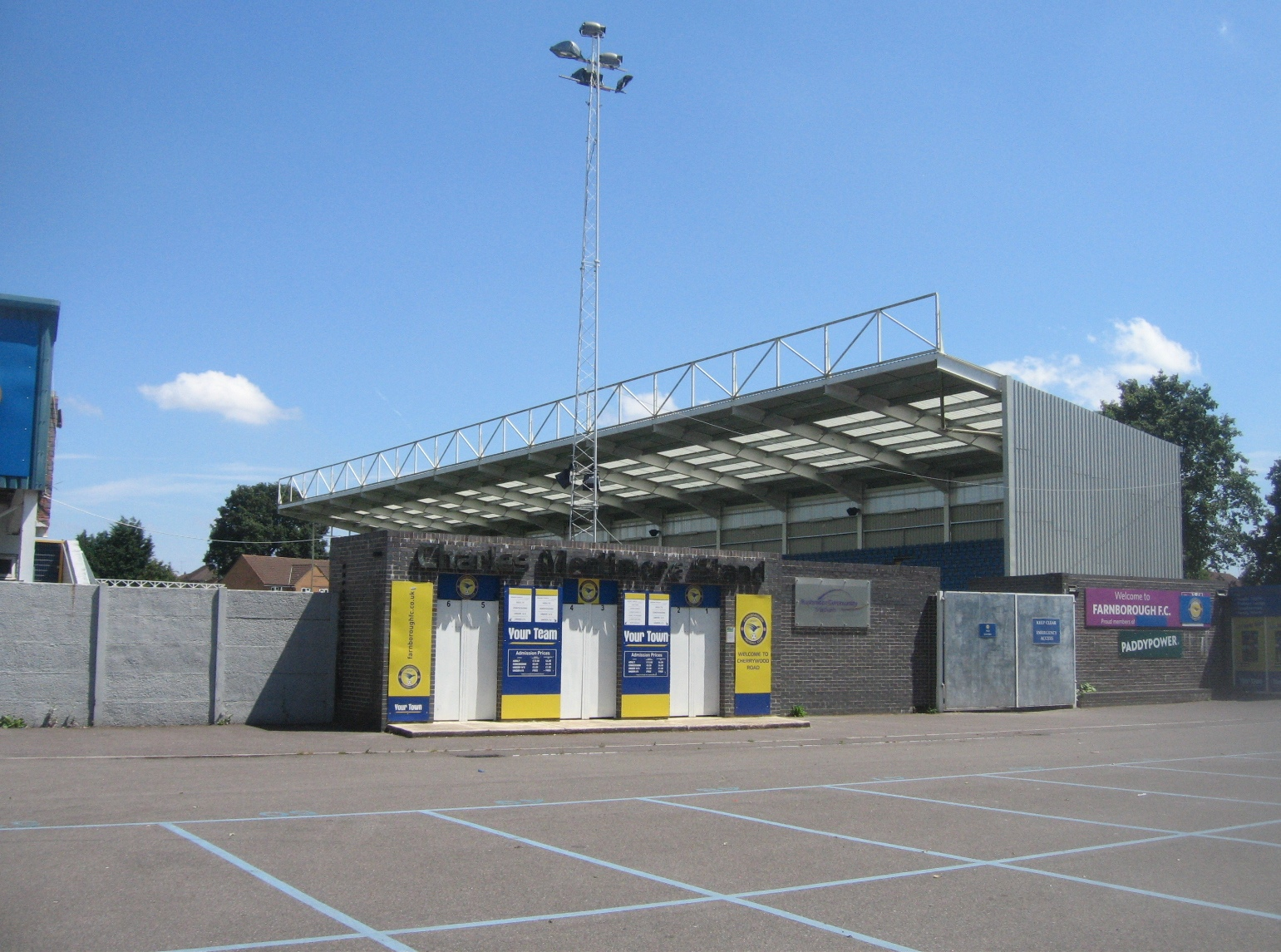
Cherrywood Road

The town's rugby union club, Farnborough RFC, was established in 1915 and has long been a fixture of the local sporting scene. The club's current home ground is at Tile Barn Close and it fields teams across various levels of the Hampshire leagues.

Farnborough FC plays at Cherrywood Road in the National League South. The club has a long and storied history, dating back to the late 19th century; it has occasionally gained national prominence, most notably when they reached the fourth round of the FA Cup in 2003, where they were narrowly defeated by Arsenal at Highbury.

Other sports catered for in the town include cricket, with Cove Cricket Club playing in the Morrant Thames Valley Cricket League, and hockey, where the Camberley and Farnborough Hockey Club represents the local area. There are also tennis clubs, a cycling club and facilities for various other recreational activities.

== Arts and entertainment ==
Farnborough has a varied cultural offering, with a range of arts, entertainment and leisure facilities catering to local residents and visitors.

Farnborough is also home to several museums and heritage attractions that celebrate the town's rich aviation history. The Farnborough Air Sciences Trust (FAST) operates a museum dedicated to the legacy of the Royal Aircraft Establishment, with exhibits on the development of British aeronautical technology. Visitors can also explore the historic wind tunnels on the former RAE site, which have been preserved as listed buildings.

== Notable people ==
- Fernand Cabrol, monk and scholar became Prior and, later, Abbot at the Benedictine abbey
- Robbe De Hert, Belgian film director, was born in Farnborough
- Empress Eugenie, her husband Napoleon III and son Louis Napoleon are entombed in the crypt at Saint Michael's Abbey. It was only Eugenie who was a resident of Farnborough
- Arthur English lived in Farnborough for a period
- Composer Percy Fletcher lived in Farnborough during the 1920s, when he was working in London as a theatre composer and conductor
- In 1922, T. E. Lawrence (Lawrence of Arabia) was posted to RAF Farnborough for a photography course, it is thought he lived in Farnborough for 6 weeks
- Christopher Lillicrap, children's TV presenter and writer
- Arthur Pendragon, a leading Neo-Druid activist, was brought up in Farnborough and had his primary residence there for much of his adult life.
- Anne Robinson went to school in Farnborough
- Shaun Udal, former Middlesex County Cricket Club captain, who also played for Hampshire and at international level for England, was born and raised here
- Actress Janet Wright was born in Farnborough before moving to Canada as a child.
- All 3 members of Remember Monday (Charlotte Steele, Holly-Anne Hull and Lauren Byrne), who represented the United Kingdom in the Eurovision Song Contest 2025, attended college in Farnborough.

== See also ==
- Basingstoke Canal
- List of schools in Hampshire
- List of further education colleges in Hampshire
