= The Costello School =

Location
- Crossborough Hill, London Road; Basingstoke, Hampshire, RG21 4AL; England
- 51.2617°N 1.0789°W

Information
- Type: Academy
- Motto: Enjoy, Respect, Achieve.
- Established: 1908
- Founder: Harriet Costello
- Local authority: Hampshire County Council
- Trust: Bohunt Education Trust
- Department for Education URN: 138287 Tables
- Ofsted: Reports
- Head teacher: Andrew Conway
- Gender: Mixed
- Age range: 11–16
- Enrolment: 1,164 (2025)
- Capacity: 1,200
- Houses: Attenborough; Parks; Turing; Ali; Austen
- Website: www.costelloschool.co.uk

The Costello School is an 11–16 mixed secondary school with academy status in Basingstoke, Hampshire, England.

Originally (in 1908), the school opened as Basingstoke High School for girls. When it became a co-ed in 1972, it became Harriet Costello Secondary School. But was later renamed Costello Technology College after gaining specialist Technology College status. The school was converted to academy status on 1 July 2012 and was renamed The Costello School. Before becoming an academy, it was a community school under the direct control of Hampshire County Council. The school continues to coordinate with Hampshire County Council for admissions. The school, as of 1 September 2018, is now part of the multi-academy trust (MAT) Bohunt Education Trust.

== Notable alumni ==
- Elizabeth Hurley, actress and model.
- Tom Rees, ex-England rugby union footballer.
