= Queen Mary's College, Basingstoke =

Queen Mary's College

Location
- Cliddesden Road; Basingstoke, Hampshire, RG21 3HF; 51°15′22″N 1°5′16″W

Information
- Former name: Shrubbery Secondary Modern Girls School; Queen Mary's Grammar School for Boys
- Type: Sixth Form College
- Religious affiliation: None
- Opened: 1556 (founding school); 1972 (6th form college)
- Local authority: Hampshire
- Trust: North Hampshire Education Alliance
- Department for Education URN: 130700 Tables
- Principal: Mark Henderson
- Gender: Coeducational
- Age: 16+
- Enrolment: 2600
- Website: www.qmc.ac.uk

Queen Mary's College (QMC) is a sixth form college in Basingstoke, Hampshire, England. Its history may be traced back to the former grammar school Queen Mary's School, founded in 1556 in the northern part of Basingstoke. The college is housed in the former school buildings of the Shrubbery All Girls secondary modern, which date back to the early 1950s.

As of 2019, the college is managed and run as an academy, by the single academy trust North Hampshire Education Trust.

== Site ==
The college was opened in 1972. Most of the college's classrooms are housed in a single two-storey widespread main building, with a few smaller buildings providing most of the rest of the teaching space. ICT & Art (and related subjects) are housed in The Allen Building, a £6m 3-storey teaching block completed in 2005. Science, English, Modern Foreign Languages and Foundation Learning takes place in a multimillion-pound teaching block called The Spectrum, which was completed during the later part of 2009, with the first lessons taking place at the beginning of January 2010. The building was officially opened by quantum physicist Jim Al-Khalili on Friday 23 April 2010. Drama and Music are located in the Central Studio, which plays host to a number of shows and performances all year round. In 2021, one floor of an existing building was converted to provide space for the new Esports BTEC qualification offered at the college.

=== QM Sports Centre ===
QM Sports Centre is located on the main college campus and, although open to the general public, is widely used by the college both as a sports centre and for educational reasons, with all physical education taking place here. The centre's main facilities are a 630 square metres (6,800 sq ft) hall and a 23 metres (75 ft) swimming pool. The centre itself also incorporates a fitness centre and viewing gallery and also makes use of the college's various football, rugby and artificial turfed pitches.

=== Central Studio ===
Central Studio is a professional theatre located on the college campus. While the college's various departments use the facilities of Central Studio, including the bar, theatre, dance studio and recording facilities the building itself is often used to host various professional productions and concerts. In 2009, Central Studio put on a production of 'The Laramie Project', a play about an American youth who was killed for his sexuality. Westboro Church planned to picket outside the college in protest, but were banned from the UK as a precaution against inciting hatred.

In 1978 Peter Cushing was present at the official opening of Central studio where students presented a number of theatrical and musical performances.

One of the short plays performed was called The British Education Game, written and performed by the Drama students.

== Curriculum ==
Queen Mary's College offers AS and A-level courses in 40 different subjects, as well as several vocational courses and BTEC national diplomas.

The college has approximately 2400 students (the majority aged between 16 and 19) enrolled on full-time courses. It also offers a range of Adult Education opportunities, and has over 1000 students enrolled on part-time courses. The majority of students come from the Basingstoke and Deane & Hart areas.

== Notable alumni ==
- Sarah Beeny – broadcaster
- Christian Brassington – actor
- James Bye – actor
- Shelley Conn – actress
- Monty Don – horticulturist
- E. O. Higgins – writer and podcaster
- Elizabeth Hurley – actress
- Jeff Minter – video game designer
- Kathy Smallwood-Cook – Olympic sprinter
- Alex Thomson – journalist
- Ramon Tikaram – actor
- Tanita Tikaram – singer/songwriter
