= UK Rock Challenge =

Former performing arts competition

The Rock Challenge logo

The UK Rock Challenge was the British arm of the Rock Eisteddfod Challenge. The Rock Challenge was an anti-drug and crime-prevention event that took the form of a friendly performing arts competition for schools and colleges. Originating in Australia in the 1980s, it reached the United Kingdom after inspector Mark Pontin of Hampshire saw it in 1995 and was so impressed that he persuaded Hampshire's constabulary to form a joint venture with Tony Barron, chairman of the Hampshire Education Committee and Peter Coles, UK Rock Challenge's chief executive. Together, they introduced it in Hampshire and found joint funding to support it.

The first UK event took place in Portsmouth Guildhall in Portsmouth in 1996 and involved 11 schools and around 750 young people. Rock Challenge then expanded into many additional areas across the UK. In 2016, there were 49 days of events. The event stopped abruptly in 2019.

== The event ==
The premise of the Rock Challenge is that each school puts together an 8-minute dance and drama production on a theme of their choice set to a soundtrack of commercially available music. Over the course of months/weeks schools create their production and finally bring it to an event day held at a professional venue where they spend the day rehearsing and preparing for an evening show where parents, peers, community members, and invited guests attend. During the evening, a panel of judges give verbal feedback on each performance and also score each piece based on strict criteria. Performances are judged on:

Performance Judge Marks:

- Choreography (out of 10)
- Performance Skill (out of 10)
- Soundtrack (out of 10)

Production Judge Marks:

- Hair and Make-up (out of 10)
- Costume (out of 10)
- Lighting (out of 10)

Drama and Design Judge Marks:

- Drama (out of 10)
- Set Design and Function (out of 10)
- Concept (out of 10)

Each judge also gives the performance a mark for 'Overall Impact' out of 5.

At the end of the evening, a prize ceremony is held where a number of awards are presented along with the announcement of the top-scoring schools.

== The Rock Challenge message ==
The core message of the Be Your Best Rock Challenge is to show young people how they can achieve a 'natural high' on life rather than with the use of drugs, alcohol and tobacco - the concept is that through participation in the event at a professional venue with a professional production and technical crew, the students are helped in the belief that they can achieve a high on life rather than relying on substances. This is emphasised during the event where everyone is warned that if anyone is caught smoking, taking drugs or drinking alcohol the individual/s concerned will be asked to leave and their team will be deducted two overall ranking places (making it impossible for them to win or go further in the competition).

Participation in the Rock Challenge has shown to have many positive effects on participants, schools, and communities, including:

- Self-esteem
- Teamwork skills
- Anti-social behaviour
- Truancy rates
- Curriculum links
- Teacher-student relations
- School-community relations

== Concept, history and Australian origins ==
Rock Challenge has been running in the UK since 1996 (see above) and has been running as the Rock Eisteddfod Challenge in Australia since 1980 (see History in Rock Eisteddfod Challenge page) and has reached out across the world to New Zealand (Stage Challenge), Japan (Rock Challenge Japan), Germany, South Africa (ARA Be Your Best Rock Challenge) and UAE (set up by the British Be Your Best Rock Challenge). Rock Challenge also had a short and small stay in the US, but there has been no known activity since the confirmation of two events for 2004.

Just like in the UK, since its inception in Australia the events have grown in popularity, so much that the National Finals are shown on the Nine Network over a period of weeks on a Saturday Morning (after being previously recorded live). This television coverage has been happening since the early 1990s, but since the UK launch in 1996 it still does not have any major media coverage there.

The most famous participant of Rock Challenge in the UK was the actress Emma Watson from the Harry Potter franchise. She participated twice, once in 2006 and once as the Rock Challenge leader in 2007 with her school in Oxford.

== Competition format ==
Rock Challenge is split into 2 age brackets:

J Rock J Rock started in the UK in 2005 for participants aged 7–11. Many J Rock events are not full competitions based on the desires of the local schools and sponsors.

Rock Challenge Rock Challenge is for participants aged 11–18. As of 2004, Rock Challenge has been split into 2 competition divisions; the Open and the Premier divisions: In the 'Open' Division:

- Open Division schools take part in heats across the country. Schools that win their heat (plus many that place 2nd) progress to the Regional Open Grand Final (North or South depending on the heat location).
- Due to the increasing number of teams entering, there are 2 Open Grand Finals ('A' and 'B') for each region.
- In most cases each Open Grand Final winner (and one of the schools that places second) is promoted to the Premier Division for the following year (if one of the Premier Division schools chooses not to participate in any given year, their Premier Final space may be awarded to the other school that places 2nd at the Open Grand Final or possibly the school that placed 3rd behind the 2nd place promoted school).
- Throughout the heats and finals, schools also compete for awards which merit the teams' performances in certain aspects of the piece - these range from hair and make up to video performance.

In the 'Premier' Division:

- In each region there are 12 Premier Division schools in any given year.
- In the majority of cases, Premier schools are required to showcase their performance before competing at the Regional Premier Grand Final.
- Premier schools compete against each other in the region's Premier Grand Final where they will compete for ranking places and awards (as per the Open Division).
- To remain in the Premier Division, schools are required to place in the top nine at the Regional Final, which, added together with the winners and runners-up from the Open Grand Finals, gives you the Premier Schools for the following year.

From 2007, National Awards have also been awarded, judged nationally by a panel of judges new and independent from those at the live events, announcing each division's top schools for each criterion.

Scottish Grand Final As of 2012, schools participating in Scottish events will compete at heats for a place in the Scottish Grand Final held in Dundee. Should a school win the Scottish Grand Final two years in succession they will be given the option of competing in the Northern Region Premier Division for the following year. Should a school win the Scottish Grand Final three years in succession they will be automatically moved into the Northern Region Premier Grand Final for the following year.

National Grand Final In 2009 the UK's first National Grand Final was held at the Sheffield Arena. This consisted of the top 5 schools from each Premier Final along with the top scoring first place from the Open finals (one from the North and one from the South) giving twelve schools: Sandown High School from Sandown, Isle of Wight won this event with their performance 'Cursed' after winning their Open Grand Final.

In 2012 the second UK Rock Challenge National Grand Final was held at the Milton Keynes Theatre, Milton Keynes: Kings Langley School, Hertfordshire won this event with their performance entitled 'Swift as a shadow short as any dream.'.

== Events and venues ==
Since 1996, the Tour has been to many venues around the country and as Rock Challenge has become larger, so have the venues. Even just in the first year it grew from one night and one event to 8 venues and 11 nights.

With the planned National Grand Final, it would bring the biggest ever venue ever used by the Rock Challenge team in the UK, The Sheffield Arena with a capacity up to 12,500 seated (downgraded to 4000 seats for Final).

As of 2012 the events will have taken place in the following towns/cities across the UK:

• Aberdeen • Arbroath • Basingstoke • Belfast • Bournemouth • Bradford • Brighton • Carlisle • Crawley • Croydon • Derby • Dundee • Eastbourne • Grantham • Grimsby • Hackney • Hemel Hempstead • Hull • Inverness • Leeds • Lincoln • London (central) • Manchester • Margate • Milton Keynes • North Finchley • Portsmouth • Reading • Rotherham • Sheffield • Skegness • Southampton • St Albans • Stevenage • York

== Results ==
Since its inception in 1996, many UK Rock Challenge events have taken place up and down the nation; below is a full chronological list of results (announced places) from the first event to the present day:

== 1996 ==
1996 Be Your Best Rock Challenge
Portsmouth Guildhall, Portsmouth, Hampshire

1st Place	Victory-Land Children's Theatre Group, Southsea, Hampshire	Things that go bump in the night
2nd Place	Park Community School, Leigh Park, Hampshire	
3rd Place	Cantell School, Southampton, Hampshire	

Awards:

Cantell School, Southampton, Hampshire	Most Outstanding Set Design and Staging
King Richard School, Portsmouth, Hampshire	Most Outstanding Backstage Crew
Mayville High School, Southsea, Hampshire	Most Outstanding Concept
Brune Park Community School, Gosport, Hampshire	Most Outstanding Lighting Design
Portsmouth YMCA, Portsmouth, Hampshire	Most Outstanding Make-up
Victory-Land Children's Theatre Group, Southsea, Hampshire	Most Outstanding Costume Most Outstanding Soundtrack
The Wavell School, Farnborough, Hampshire	Most Outstanding Choreography

== 1997 ==
1997 Be Your Best Croydon Rock Challenge
Ashcroft Theatre, Croydon, Surrey
Wednesday, 26 February

1st Place	Hurstmere Boys Secondary School, Sidcup, Kent	British Bulldog
2nd Place	Eltham Hill Secondary School, Eltham, Greenwich	Dance Until Dawn
3rd Place	Thomas Tallis School, Kidbrooke, Greenwich	Spiritual High

Awards:

Chislehurst and Sidcup, Sidcup, Kent	The Purrfect Pounce	Best Hair and Make-up BT Award for Most Entertaining Performance; Metropolitan Police Award for Best Stage Crew
Eltham Hill Secondary School, Eltham, Greenwich	Dance Until Dawn	Night and Day Award for Best Concept
Hurstmere Boys Secondary School, Sidcup, Kent	British Bulldog	Tacking Drugs Together Award for Best Costume Design Award for Best Soundtrack; Award for Best Choreography
St Thomas More, West Grinstead, West Sussex	Title unknown	Greenwich Safer Cities Award for Best Set Design and Staging Award for Best Lighting Design
Thomas Tallis School, Kidbrooke, Greenwich	Spiritual High	
The Welling School, Welling, Kent	They Don't Really Care About Us	Greenwich Borough Council Award for Best Drama Skills Encouragement Award

1997 Get Real Be Your Best Portsmouth Rock Challenge Day One
Portsmouth Guildhall, Portsmouth, Hampshire
Tuesday, 4 March

1st Place	Park Community College, Leigh Park, Hampshire	Step Back in Time
2nd Place	City of Portsmouth Girls’ School, Portsmouth, Hampshire	Fit for Life
3rd Place	Crookhorn Community School, Waterlooville, Hampshire	A Devil of a Dream

Awards:

Brune Park Community College, Gosport, Hampshire	Is This The World We've Created?	Sony Award for Best Soundtrack Gosport Borough Council Award for Best Lighting Design
City of Portsmouth Girls’ School, Portsmouth, Hampshire	Fit for Life	Portsmouth Safer Cities' Award for Best Set Design and Staging
Crookhorn Community School, Waterlooville, Hampshire	A Devil of a Dream	Wella Award for Best Hair and Make-up Portsmouth City Council Award for Best Choreography
Frogmore Community College, Yateley, Hampshire	Title unknown	Night and Day Award for Best Concept
King Richard School Team One, Portsmouth, Hampshire	Love at Third Sight	Hampshire Constabulary Award for Best Stage Crew Hampshire Police Authority Student Leadership Award
Park Community College, Leigh Park, Hampshire	Step Back in Time	Tackling Drugs Together Award for Best Costume Design Hampshire County Council Award for Best Drama Skills
St Luke's C of E School, Southsea, Hampshire	They Have Landed	Hampshire Police Authority Encouragement Award Hampton Trust Performers' Performers Award
Victory-Land Theatre School, Southsea, Hampshire	Do You Believe In Magic?	BT Award for Most Entertaining Performance Producer's Award for Excellence

1997 Get Real Be Your Best Portsmouth Rock Challenge Day Two
Portsmouth Guildhall, Portsmouth, Hampshire
Thursday, 5 March

1st Place	King Richard School Team One, Portsmouth, Hampshire	We are the Future
2nd Place	Ratton School, Eastbourne, East Sussex	Lady Heroin
3rd Place	Tideway School, Newhaven, East Sussex	A Taste of Honey

Awards:

King Richard School Team Two, Portsmouth, Hampshire	We are the Future	Portsmouth Safer Cities Award for Best Set Design and Staging Hampton Trust Performers' Performers Award; Gosport Borough Council Award for Best Lighting Design
Mayville High School, Southsea, Hampshire	Hooray for Hollywood	Tackling Drugs Together Award for Best Costume Design
Portsmouth YMCA, Portsmouth, Hampshire	Feel the Rhythm	Wella Award for Best Hair and Make-up Producer's Award for Excellence
Ratton School, Eastbourne, East Sussex	Lady Heroin	Portsmouth City Council Award for Best Choreography Sony Award for Best Soundtrack
St Edmund's Catholic School, Portsmouth, Hampshire	Title unknown	BT Award for Most Entertaining Performance
Tideway School, Newhaven, East Sussex	A Taste of Honey	Night and Day Award for Best Concept
Wildern School Team One, Hedge End, Hampshire	Girl Power	Hampshire Constabulary Award for Best Stage Crew Hampshire Police Authority Student Leadership Award
Wildern School Team Two, Hedge End, Hampshire	A Space to Grow	Hampshire County Council Award for Best Drama Skills

1997 Get Real 2CR FM Be Your Best Bournemouth Rock Challenge
Bournemouth Pavilion, Bournemouth, Dorset
Friday, 7 March

1st Place	The Purbeck School, Wareham, Dorset	Psychedelia
2nd Place	Youth Dance On	A Day on the Bridge
3rd Place	Corfe Hills School, Poole, Dorset	Famous People

Awards:

The Bicknell School, Bournemouth, Dorset	Our Story	Night and Day Award for Best Concept 2CR FM Award for Best Soundtrack
Corfe Hills School, Poole, Dorset	Famous People	Award for Best Drama Skills BT Award for Most Entertaining Performance
Highcliffe School, Christchurch, Dorset	Aspects of American Culture	Tackling Drugs Together Award for Best Costume Design Award for Best Lighting Design
Oakmead College of Technology, Bournemouth, Dorset	Dance to the End of the Line	Performers' Performers Award
The Purbeck School, Wareham, Dorset	Psychedelia	Award for Best Hair and Make-up Dorset Police Award for Best Stage Crew; Bournemouth Borough Council Award for Best Choreography
Youth Dance On	A Day on the Bridge	Award for Best Set Design and Staging

1997 Get Real 2-Ten FM Be Your Best Basingstoke Rock Challenge
The Anvil Theatre, Basingstoke, Hampshire
Wednesday, 12 March

1st Place	Wavell School Team One, Farnborough, Hampshire	Dreamers Cafe
2nd Place	Wavell School Team Two, Farnborough, Hampshire	Games Without Frontiers
3rd Place	The Hurst Community School, Baughurst, Hampshire	Dance in the 20th Century

Awards:

Fort Hill Community School, Basingstoke, Hampshire	Kaleidescope	BT Award for Most Entertaining Performance Hampshire Police Authority Encouragement Award
The Hurst Community School, Baughurst, Hampshire	Dance in the 20th Century	Night and Day Award for Best Concept Sony Award for Best Soundtrack; Award for Best Lighting Design
Richard Aldworth School, Basingstoke, Hampshire	Be The Best You Can Be	Wella Award for Best Hair and Make Up Hampton Trust Performers' Performers Award
Wavell School Team One, Farnborough, Hampshire	Dreamers Cafe	Tackling Drugs Together Award for Best Costume Design Hampshire Constabulary Award for Best Stage Crew
Wavell School Team Two, Farnborough, Hampshire	Games Without Frontiers	Award for Best Set Design and Staging Basingstoke & Deane Borough Council Award for Best Choreography; Hampshire County Council Award for Best Drama Skills

1997 Get Real Be Your Best Southampton Rock Challenge
Southampton Guildhall, Southampton, Hampshire
Friday, 14 March

1st Place	Cantell Secondary School, Southampton, Hampshire	That's Entertainment
2nd Place	Alderman Quilley School, Eastleigh, Hampshire	Our Beautiful Neighbourhood
3rd Place	Osborne Middle School, East Cowes, Isle of Wight	Staying Alive

Awards:

Cantell Secondary School, Southampton, Hampshire	That's Entertainment	Tackling Drugs Together Award for Best Costume Design Southampton Council Award for Best Choreography; Hampshire County Council Award for Best Drama Skills; BT Award for Most Entertaining Performance
Osborne Middle School, East Cowes, Isle of Wight	Staying Alive	Award for Best Set Design and Staging
Alderman Quilley School, Eastleigh, Hampshire	Our Beautiful Neighbourhood	Wella Award for Best Hair and Make Up Hampshire Constabulary Award for Best Stage Crew
Redbridge Community School, Southampton, Hampshire	From Hatred to Hate	Night and Day Award for Best Concept Sony Award for Best Soundtrack
Woodlands Community College, Southampton, Hampshire	Life's Journey	Hampshire Police Authority Award for Best Lighting Design Performers' Performers Award

1997 Lifestyle Be Your Best Hull Rock Challenge
Hull New Theatre, Hull
Wednesday, 19 March

1st Place	Baysgarth School, Barton-Upon-Humber, North Lincolnshire	Title unknown
2nd Place	Driffield School, Driffield, East Riding of Yorkshire	Title unknown
3rd Place	Lindsey School, Cleethorpes, North East Lincolnshire	Title unknown

Awards:

Baysgarth School, Barton-Upon-Humber, North Lincolnshire	Title unknown	BT Award for Most Entertaining Performance
Driffield School, Driffield, East Riding of Yorkshire	Title unknown	Night and Day Award for Best Concept Prince's Trust Award for Best Drama Skills
Hornsea School, Hornsea, East Riding of Yorkshire	Title unknown	Foundation for Sports and the Arts Award for Best Choreography Encouragement Award
Howden School, Howden, East Riding of Yorkshire	Title unknown	Provident Finance Award for Best Hair and Make-up Tackling Drugs Together Award for Best Costume Design
Lindsey School, Cleethorpes, North East Lincolnshire	Title unknown	Award for Best Set Design and Staging
South Hunsley School, Melton, East Riding of Yorkshire	Title unknown	Award for Best Soundtrack Humberside Police Award for Best Stage Crew
Withernsea High School, Withernsea, East Riding of Yorkshire	Title unknown	Lifestyle Award for Best Lighting Design Performers' Performers Award

1997 Be Your Best Fox FM Oxford Rock Challenge
Apollo Theatre, Oxford, Oxfordshire
Friday, 11 April

1st Place	Peers School, Oxford, Oxfordshire	The Other Side of Life
2nd Place	King Alfred's School East, Wantage, Oxfordshire	The Party
3rd Place	Matthew Arnold School, Oxford, Oxfordshire	Space

Awards:

King Alfred's School East, Wantage, Oxfordshire	Example	Fox FM Award for Best Soundtrack Award for Best Lighting Design; BT Award for Most Entertaining Performance
King Alfred's School West, Wantage, Oxfordshire	The Best of the 60s, 70s, 80s and 90s	Encouragement Award Student Leadership Award; Performers' Performers Award
Matthew Arnold School, Oxford, Oxfordshire	Space	Tackling Drugs Together Award for Best Costume Design Student Leadership Award
Peers School, Oxford, Oxfordshire	The Other Side of Life	Award for Best Hair and Make-up Night and Day Award for Best Concept; Thames Valley Police Award for Best Stage Crew
Sparkle Stage Set	Dancing in the Street	Oxford Safer Cities Award for Best Set Design and Staging Award for Best Choreography; Award for Best Drama Skills

1997 Be Your Best The Pulse Bradford Rock Challenge
St George's Hall, Bradford, West Yorkshire
Monday, 14 April

1st Place	The Ridings School, Halifax, West Yorkshire	Bad Press
2nd Place	Thornton Grammar School, Bradford, West Yorkshire	Drugs and Rave
3rd Place	Merlyn Rees High School, Leeds, West Yorkshire	Walls and Bridges

Awards:

Buttershaw High School, Bradford, West Yorkshire	Peer Pressure	Provident Finance Award for Best Hair and Make-up Night and Day Award for Best Concept; The Pulse of West Yorkshire Award for Best Soundtrack
Merlyn Rees High School, Leeds, West Yorkshire	Walls and Bridges	Award for Best Set Design and Staging West Yorkshire Police Award for Best Drama Skills
Queensbury School, Bradford, West Yorkshire	HIV and the Blood	Tackling Drugs Together Award for Best Costume Design Award for Best Lighting Design; Encouragement Award
The Ridings School, Halifax, West Yorkshire	Bad Press	Award for Best Choreography Award for Best Stage Crew
Thornton Grammar School, Bradford, West Yorkshire	Drugs and Rave	BT Award for Most Entertaining Performance Performers' Performers Award

1997 Be Your Best The Pulse Rock Challenge Northern Grand Final
St George's Hall, Bradford, West Yorkshire
Tuesday, 15 April

1st Place	Merlyn Rees High School, Leeds, West Yorkshire	Walls and Bridges
2nd Place	Driffield School, Driffield, East Riding of Yorkshire	Title unknown
3rd Place	South Hunsley School, Melton, East Ridings of Yorkshire	Title unknown

Awards:

Baysgarth School, Barton-Upon-Humber, North Lincolnshire	Title unknown	Provident Financial Award for Best Hair and Make-up Prince's Trust Award for Best Lighting Design
Driffield School, Driffield, East Riding of Yorkshire	Title unknown	Foundation for Sport and the Arts Award for Award for Best Choreography
Lindsey School, Cleethorpes, North East Lincolnshire	Title unknown	BT Award for Most Entertaining Performance Performers' Performers Award
Merlyn Rees High School, Leeds, West Yorkshire	Walls and Bridges	West Yorkshire Police Award for Best Drama Skills
The Ridings School, Halifax, West Yorkshire	Bad Press	Night and Day Award for Best Concept The Pulse of West Yorkshire Award for Best Soundtrack; Lifestyle Award for Best Stage Crew
South Hunsley School, Melton, East Ridings of Yorkshire	Title unknown	Tackling Drugs Together Award for Best Costume Design
Thornton Grammar School, Bradford, West Yorkshire	Drugs and Rave	Best Set Design and Staging Encouragement Award

1997 Be Your Best Get Real Rock Challenge Southern Grand Final
Portsmouth Guildhall, Portsmouth, Hampshire
Thursday, 17 April

1st Place	Ratton School, Eastbourne, East Sussex	Lady Heroin
2nd Place	Wavell School Team Two, Farnborough, Hampshire	Games Without Frontiers
3rd Place	King Richard School Team Two, Portsmouth, Hampshire	We are the Future

Awards:

Cantell Secondary School, Southampton, Hampshire	That's Entertainment	Hampshire County Council Award for Best Drama Skills
City of Portsmouth Girls’ School, Portsmouth, Hampshire	Fit for Life	Tackling Drugs Together Award for Best Costume Design; Student Leadership Award
Hurstmere Boys Secondary School, Sidcup, Kent	British Bulldog	Night and Day Award for Best Concept; Southampton City Council Encouragement Award
King Richard School Team Two, Portsmouth, Hampshire	We are the Future	Hampshire Constabulary Award for Best Lighting Design
Park Community College, Leigh Park, Hampshire	Step Back in Time	BT Award for Most Entertaining Performance; Hampton Trust Performers' Performers Award
Peers School, Oxford, Oxfordshire	The Other Side of Life	Hampshire Police Authority Award for Best Stage Crew
The Purbeck School, Wareham, Dorset	Psychedelia	Shockwaves Award for Best Hair and Make-up
Ratton School, Eastbourne, East Sussex	Lady Heroin	Portsmouth City Council Award for Best Choreography
Wavell School Team One, Farnborough, Hampshire	Dreamers Cafe	Sony Award for Best Soundtrack
Wavell School Team Two, Farnborough, Hampshire	Games Without Frontiers	Safer Cities Award for Best Set Design and Staging

== 1998 ==
1998 Get Real 2-Ten FM Be Your Best Basingstoke Rock Challenge
The Anvil, Basingstoke, Hampshire
Tuesday, 2 March

1st Place	The Wavell School, Farnborough, Hampshire	Life - But not as we know it
2nd Place	Fort Hill Community School Team Two, Basingstoke, Hampshire	The Dance Expresses Our Lives
3rd Place	The Hurst Community School, Baughurst, Hampshire	Earth Spirit

Awards:

Churchfield School, Swindon, Wiltshire	All Different All Equal	Hampshire County Council Award for Best Drama Skills; Hampshire Police Authority Encouragement Award
Fort Hill Community School Team Two, Basingstoke, Hampshire	The Dance Expresses Our Lives	Hampshire Probation Service Award for Best Costume Design; 2 Ten FM Award for Best Soundtrack
Fort Hill Community School Team Three, Basingstoke, Hampshire	Death and Rebirth	Motorola Award for Best Concept; Basingstoke and North Hampshire DAT Award for Achievement in Drug Awareness; Daihatsu Award for Best Lighting Design
The Hurst Community School, Baughurst, Hampshire	Earth Spirit	Hampton Tryst Performers’ Performers Award; Basingstoke and Deane Borough Council Award for Best Set Design and Staging; Hampshire Training and Enterprise Council Award for Student Leadership
Richard Aldworth School, Basingstoke, Hampshire	Self Image	Wella Award for Best Hair and Make-up
The Wavell School, Farnborough, Hampshire	Life - But not as we know it	BT Award for Most Entertaining Performance; British Aerospace Award for Best Choreography; Hampshire Constabulary Award for Best Stage Crew

1998 Get Real Be Your Best Southampton Rock Challenge
Southampton Guildhall, Southampton, Hampshire
Thursday, 5 March

1st Place	Wildern School Seniors, Hedge End, Hampshire	Treading the Fine Line
2nd Place	Osborne Middle School, East Cowes, Isle of Wight	Millennium Dance
3rd Place	Brune Park School	Title unknown

Awards:

Alderman Quilley School, Eastleigh, Hampshire	Dare to be different	Best Set Design and Staging
Brune Park School	Title unknown	Best Hair and Make-up; Hampshire Training and Enterprise Council Award for Student Leadership; Southampton and SW Hampshire DAT Award for Achievement in Drug Awareness
Osborne Middle School, East Cowes, Isle of Wight	Millennium Dance	Hampshire Probation Service Award for Best Costume Design; Gosport Borough Council Award for Best Choreography
Redbridge School, Southampton, Hampshire	Title unknown	Best Soundtrack; Southampton City Council Award for Best Concept; Hampshire Constabulary Award for Best Stage Crew; Daihatsu Award for Best Lighting Design
Ryde High School, Ryde, Isle of Wight	James Bond - A Bond for Life	Eastleigh Borough Council Award for Best Drama Skills; Hampton Trust Performers’ Performers Award
Wildern School Juniors, Hedge End, Hampshire	Title unknown	Hampshire Police Authority Encouragement Award
Wildern School Seniors, Hedge End, Hampshire	Treading the Fine Line	BT Award for Most Entertaining Performance

1998 Get Real 2CR FM Be Your Best Bournemouth Rock Challenge
Bournemouth Pavilion, Bournemouth, Dorset
Friday, 6 March

1st Place	Highcliffe School, Christchurch, Dorset	Africa
2nd Place	The Purbeck School, Wareham, Dorset	Fatal Fashion
3rd Place	Carter School, Poole, Dorset	Choices

Awards:

Arnewood School, New Milton, Hampshire	Choose Life - The New Future	Best Costume Design; Dorset Police Award for Best Stage Crew; Daihatsu Award for Best Lighting Design
Carter School, Poole, Dorset	Choices	BT Award for Most Entertaining Performance
Glenmoor School, Bournemouth, Dorset	Global Peace	Performers’ Performers Award; Police Partnership Trust Award for Best Concept
Highcliffe School, Christchurch, Dorset	Africa	Best Set Design and Staging
Lytchett Minster School, Poole, Dorset	Cognition	Best Hair and Make-up; Borough of Poole Award for Best Drama Skills
Martin Kemp-Welch School, Poole, Dorset	Danger Disguised	Encouragement Award
Oakmead College of Technology, Poole Dorset	Heaven and Hell	2CR FM Award for Best Soundtrack; Producer's Award for Student Leadership
The Purbeck School, Wareham, Dorset	Fatal Fashion	Best Choreography

1998 Get Real Be Your Best Portsmouth Rock Challenge Day One
Portsmouth Guildhall, Portsmouth, Hampshire
Monday, 9 March

1st Place	The Hayling School, Hayling Island, Hampshire	Our Lives
2nd Place	Mayville High School	007 Girl Power
3rd Place	City of Portsmouth Girls' School, Portsmouth, Hampshire	Out of a Picture

Awards:

The Blandford School, Blandford Forum, Dorset	Title unknown	Best Hair and Make-up
City of Portsmouth Girls' School, Portsmouth, Hampshire	Out of a Picture	Hampshire Probation Award for Best Costume Design; Portsmouth and South East Hampshire DAT Award for Achievement in Drug Awareness
The Hayling School, Hayling Island, Hampshire	Our Lives	Best Choreography; Portsmouth City Council Award for Best Concept
King Richard School, Portsmouth, Hampshire	Title unknown	Encouragement Award; Daihatsu Award for Best Lighting Design
Mayville High School	007 Girl Power	BT Award for Most Entertaining Performance
St Edmund's Catholic School, Portsmouth, Hampshire	Title unknown	Hampton Trust Performers’ Performers Award; Best Set Design and Staging
South Downs College, Waterlooville, Hampshire	Title unknown	Best Soundtrack; Portsmouth Safer Cities Award for Best Drama Skills; Hampshire Training and Enterprise Council Award for Student Leadership; Hampshire Constabulary Award for Best Stage Crew

1998 Get Real Be Your Best Portsmouth Rock Challenge Day Two
Portsmouth Guildhall, Portsmouth, Hampshire
Tuesday, 10 March

1st Place	Park Community School, Leigh Park, Hampshire	Sisters Are Doin' It
2nd Place	Crookhorn School, Waterlooville, Hampshire	Wheel of Fortune
3rd Place	King Richard School, Portsmouth, Hampshire	Title unknown

Awards:

City of Portsmouth Girls’ School, Portsmouth, Hampshire	Title unknown	Portsmouth Safer Cities Award for Best Drama Skills; Best Set Design and Staging; Portsmouth and South East Hampshire DAT Award for Achievement in Drug Awareness
Crookhorn School, Waterlooville, Hampshire	Wheel of Fortune	-
Frogmore Community College, Yateley, Hampshire	Title unknown	Hampshire Probation Award for Best Costume Design; Hampshire Police Authority Encouragement Award
King Richard School, Portsmouth, Hampshire	Title unknown	Best Soundtrack
Park Community School, Leigh Park, Hampshire	Sisters Are Doin' It	BT Award for Most Entertaining Performance; Best Choreography
St Luke's School, Southsea, Hampshire	Title unknown	Best Hair and Make-up; Hampton Trust Performers’ Performers Award; Portsmouth City Council Award for Best Concept; Hampshire Constabulary Award for Best Stage Crew
Stonar School, Cottles Park, Wiltshire	Title unknown	Hampshire Training and Enterprise Council Award for Student Leadership; Daihatsu Award for Best Lighting Design

1998 Lifestyle Be Your Best Hull Rock Challenge
Hull New Theatre, Hull
Tuesday, 17 March

1st Place	Cottingham School, Cottingham, East Riding of Yorkshire	It Ain't What You Do It's The Way That You Do It
2nd Place	Baysgarth School, Barton-Upon-Humber, North Lincolnshire	Good v Evil
3rd Place	Driffield School, Driffield, East Riding of Yorkshire	Hope
4th Place	Newland School for Girls, Hull	Metamorphosis

Awards:

Baysgarth School, Barton-Upon-Humber, North Lincolnshire	Good v Evil	Best Hair and Make-up; Daihatsu Award for Best Lighting Design
Cottingham School, Cottingham, East Riding of Yorkshire	It Ain't What You Do It's The Way That You Do It	BT Award for Most Entertaining Performance; Performers’ Performers Award
Driffield School, Driffield, East Riding of Yorkshire	Hope	British Aerospace Award for Best Set Design and Staging
Hornsea School, Hornsea, East Riding of Yorkshire	Title unknown	Best Soundtrack; Encouragement Award
Howden School, Howden, East Riding of Yorkshire	Title unknown	Best Drama Skills
Kingston School, Hull	Title unknown	Lifestyle Award for Best Concept
Newland School for Girls, Hull	Metamorphosis	Foundation for Sport and the Arts Award for Best Choreography; Producer's Award for Student Leadership; Hull and East Riding DAT Award for Achievement in Drug Awareness
Sydney Smith School, Hull	Theme unknown	Best Costume Design; Humberside Police Award for Best Stage Crew

1998 Be Your Best The Pulse Leeds Rock Challenge
Leeds Grand Theatre, Leeds, West Yorkshire
Friday, 20 March

1st Place	John Smeaton School, Leeds, West Yorkshire	Junk
2nd Place	Sowerby Bridge School, Calderdale, West Yorkshire	Life - Is the Grass Greener?
3rd Place	Merlyn Rees High School, Leeds, West Yorkshire	Down but not out
4th Place	City of Leeds School, Leeds, West Yorkshire	Roots of Youth

Awards:

City of Leeds School, Leeds, West Yorkshire	Roots of Youth	Best Concept
Copperfields College, Leeds, West Yorkshire	Title unknown	BT Award for Most Entertaining Performance
John Smeaton School, Leeds, West Yorkshire	Junk	Business in the Community Award for Student Leadership
Matthew Murray School, Leeds, West Yorkshire	Title unknown	Encouragement Award
Merlyn Rees High School, Leeds, West Yorkshire	Down But Not Out	-
Ralph Thoresby School, Leeds, West Yorkshire	Title unknown	Best Soundtrack
Rastrick High School, Rastrick, West Yorkshire	Title unknown	Daihatsu Award for Best Lighting Design
The Ridings School, Halifax, West Yorkshire	Title unknown	Best Set Design and Staging
Ryburn Valley High School, Sowerby Bridge, West Yorkshire	Title unknown	Best Costume Design; West Yorkshire Police Award for Best Stage Crew
St Michael's College, Leeds, West Yorkshire	Title unknown	Best Drama Skills
Sowerby Bridge School, Calderdale, West Yorkshire	Life - Is the Grass Greener?	Performers’ Performers Award; Best Choreography
Thornton Grammar School, Bradford, West Yorkshire	Title unknown	Best Hair and Make-up

1998 Lifestyle Be Your Best Grimsby Rock Challenge
Grimsby Auditorium, Grimsby, North East Lincolnshire
Tuesday, 24 March

1st Place	Matthew Humberstone School, Cleethorpes, North East Lincolnshire	All Things Are Connected
2nd Place	The Lindsey School, Cleethorpes, North East Lincolnshire	Arms Around the World
3rd Place	South Hunsley School Team Two, Melton, East Riding of Yorkshire	Pollution on Planet Earth
4th Place	Woldgate College, Pocklington, East Riding of Yorkshire	Womens Work

Awards:

De Aston School, Market Rasen, Lincolnshire	Feel Free to Scream	Best Soundtrack; South Humber DAT Award for Achievement in Drug Awareness; Encouragement Award; Daihatsu Award for Best Lighting Design
Hessle High School, Hessle, East Riding of Yorkshire	Dance Thru a Decade	BT Award for Most Entertaining Performance; Performers’ Performers Award; Producer's Award for Student Leadership
The Lindsey School, Cleethorpes, North East Lincolnshire	Arms Around the World	Best Drama Skills
Matthew Humberstone School, Cleethorpes, North East Lincolnshire	All Things Are Connected	Best Costume Design; Foundation for Sport and the Arts Award for Best Choreography
South Hunsley School Team One, Melton, East Riding of Yorkshire	Don’t Feed the Plants	Lifestyle Award for Best Concept; Humberside Police Award for Best Stage Crew
South Hunsley School Team Two, Melton, East Riding of Yorkshire	Pollution on Planet Earth	British Aerospace Award for Best Set Design and Staging
Woldgate College, Pocklington, East Riding of Yorkshire	Womens Work	Best Hair and Make-up

1998 Be Your Best Fox FM Oxford Rock Challenge
Apollo Theatre, Oxford, Oxfordshire
Thursday, 26 March

1st Place	Aylesbury High School, Aylesbury, Buckinghamshire	Women
2nd Place	Banbury School, Banbury, Oxfordshire	Tess of the d'Urbervilles
3rd Place	The Misbourne School, Great Missenden, Buckinghamshire	And nothing but the truth

Awards:

Aylesbury High School, Aylesbury, Buckinghamshire	Women	Best Drama Skills
Banbury School, Banbury, Oxfordshire	Tess of the d'Urbervilles	Best Choreography
Headington School, Oxford, Oxfordshire	Dancing Thru the Ages	BT Award for Most Entertaining Performance; Performers’ Performers Award
Hugh Faringdon School, Reading, Berkshire	Bullying Around the World	Buckinghamshire DAT Award for Achievement in Drug Awareness; Daihatsu Award for Best Lighting Design
King Alfred's School West, Wantage, Oxfordshire	Darkness to Light	Best Hair and Make-up; Producer's Award for Student Leadership
Lord William's School, Thame, Oxfordshire	Speed	Thames Valley Partnership Award for Best Concept; Thames Valley Police Award for Best Stage Crew
The Misbourne School, Great Missenden, Buckinghamshire	And nothing but the truth	Best Set Design and Staging
Peers Upper School, Oxford, Oxfordshire	And Nothing But The Truth	Fox FM Award for Best Soundtrack; Encouragement Award
Sir William Ramsay School, Hazlemere, Buckinghamshire	Haunted House	Best Costume Design

1998 Be Your Best Brighton Rock Challenge
The Dome, Brighton
Friday, 27 March

1st Place	Davison High School, Worthing, West Sussex	Tomorrow Never Knows
2nd Place	Ratton School, Eastbourne, East Sussex	Title unknown
3rd Place	St Thomas More School, West Grinstead, West Sussex	Title unknown

Awards:

Beacon School, Crowborough, East Sussex	Title unknown	Best Concept
Davison High School, Worthing, West Sussex	Tomorrow Never Knows	Best Drama Skills; Performers’ Performers Award; Best Choreography; Sussex Police Award for Best Stage Crew
Ratton School, Eastbourne, East Sussex	Title unknown	Best Set Design and Staging
St Thomas More School	Title unknown	Best Hair and Make-up; Best Costume Design; Daihatsu Award for Best Lighting Design
Thomas Tallis School, Kidbrooke, Greenwich	Title unknown	Best Soundtrack; Producer's Award for Student Leadership; Award for Achievement in Drug Awareness; Encouragement Award
Tideway School, Newhaven, East Sussex	Title unknown	BT Award for Most Entertaining Performance

1998 Be Your Best Rock Challenge Southern Grand Final
Portsmouth Guildhall, Portsmouth, Hampshire
Tuesday, 31 March

1st Place	City of Portsmouth Girls' School, Portsmouth, Hampshire	Out of a Picture
2nd Place	Park Community School, Leigh Park, Hampshire	Sisters Are Doin' It
3rd Place	Wildern School Seniors, Hedge End, Hampshire	Treading the Fine Line

Awards:

Aylesbury High School, Aylesbury, Buckinghamshire	Women	Producer's Award for Student Leadership
Banbury School, Banbury, Oxfordshire	Tess of the d'Urbervilles	Best Drama Skills
City of Portsmouth Girls' School, Portsmouth, Hampshire	Out of a Picture	Award for Achievement in Drug Awareness
Crookhorn School, Waterlooville, Hampshire	Wheel of Fortune	Hampshire Constabulary Award for Best Stage Crew
Davison High School, Worthing, West Sussex	Tomorrow Never Knows	Best Choreography
Fort Hill Community School Team Two, Basingstoke, Hampshire	The Dance Expresses Our Lives	Performers’ Performers Award
The Hayling School, Hayling Island, Hampshire	Our Lives	Motorola Award for Best Concept
Highcliffe School, Christchurch, Dorset	Africa	Encouragement Award
Mayville High School	007 Girl Power	Best Set Design and Staging
Osborne Middle School, East Cowes, Isle of Wight	Millennium Dance	BT Award for Most Entertaining Performance
Park Community School, Leigh Park, Hampshire	Sisters Are Doin' It	Best Costume Design
The Purbeck School, Wareham, Dorset	Fatal Fashion	Mitsubishi Award for Best Soundtrack
The Wavell School, Farnborough, Hampshire	Life - But not as we know it	Best Hair and Make-up
Wildern School Seniors, Hedge End, Hampshire	Treading the Fine Line	Daihatsu Award for Best Lighting Design

1998 Lifestyle Be Your Best Grimsby Rock Challenge
Grimsby Auditorium, Grimsby, North East Lincolnshire
Tuesday, 24 March

1st Place	Driffield School, Driffield, East Riding of Yorkshire	Hope
2nd Place	The Lindsey School, Cleethorpes, North East Lincolnshire	Arms Around the World
3rd Place	South Hunsley School, Melton, East Riding of Yorkshire	Pollution on Planet Earth
4th Place	John Smeaton School, Leeds, West Yorkshire	Junk

Awards:

Baysgarth School, Barton-Upon-Humber, North Lincolnshire	Good v Evil	West Yorkshire Police Award for Best Set Design and Staging; Daihatsu Award for Best Lighting Design
City of Leeds School, Leeds, West Yorkshire	Roots of Youth	Best Choreography
Cottingham School, Cottingham, East Riding of Yorkshire	It Ain’t What You Do It’s The Way That You Do It	Best Hair and Make-up; Achievement in Drug Awareness
Driffield School, Driffield, East Riding of Yorkshire	Hope	-
John Smeaton School, Leeds, West Yorkshire	Junk	Performers’ Performers
The Lindsey School, Cleethorpes, North East Lincolnshire	Arms Around the World	Best Soundtrack
Matthew Humberstone School, Cleethorpes, North East Lincolnshire	All Things Are Connected	BT Award for Most Entertaining Performance; Lifestyle Award for Best Stage Crew
Merlyn Rees High School, Leeds, West Yorkshire	Down but not out	Best Drama Skills
Newland School for Girls, Hull	Metamorphosis	Producer's Award for Student Leadership; Humberside Police Encouragement Award
South Hunsley School, Melton, East Riding of Yorkshire	Pollution on Planet Earth	-
Sowerby Bridge School, Calderdale, West Yorkshire	Life - Is the Grass Greener?	Best Costume Design
Woldgate College, Pocklington, East Riding of Yorkshire	Women's Work	Mitsubishi Award for Best Concept

== 1999 ==
1999 Get Real Be Your Best Power FM Portsmouth Rock Challenge Day One
Portsmouth Guildhall, Portsmouth, Hampshire
Monday 1 February

1st Place
Cowes High School, Cowes, Isle of Wight
2nd Place
Park Community School, Leigh Park, Hampshire
3rd Place
Staunton Park Community School, Havant, Hampshire

1999 Get Real Be Your Best Power FM Portsmouth Rock Challenge Day Two
Portsmouth Guildhall, Portsmouth, Hampshire
Tuesday 2 February

1st Place
King Richard Secondary School Team Two, Portsmouth, Hampshire - Smash the Camera
2nd Place
South Downs College, Waterlooville, Hampshire
3rd Place
Mayville High School, Southsea, Hampshire

1999 Get Real Be Your Best 2CRFM Bournemouth Rock Challenge
Bournemouth Pavilion, Bournemouth, Dorset
Wednesday 3 February

1st Place
Corfe Hills School, Poole, Dorset
2nd Place
Blandford School, Blandford Forum, Dorset
3rd Place
The Purbeck School, Wareham, Dorset

1999 Be Your Best London Rock Challenge
Drury Lane Theatre, London
Sunday 7 February

1st Place
Peers Technology College, Oxford, Oxfordshire - The Lost Ones
Joint 2nd Place
The Misbourne School, Great Missenden, Buckinghamshire
Joint 2nd Place
Crickhowell High School, Crickhowell, Powys

1999 Be Your Best Reading Rock Challenge
The Hexagon, Reading, Berkshire
Monday 8 February

1st Place
The Wavell School, Farnborough, Hampshire
2nd Place
Frogmore Community College, Yateley, Hampshire
3rd Place
Fort Hill Community College Team Two, Basingstoke, Hampshire

1999 Be Your Best Fox FM Oxford Rock Challenge Day One
The Apollo Theatre, Oxford, Oxfordshire
Tuesday 9 February

1st Place
The Misbourne School, Great Missenden, Buckinghamshire - UHF
2nd Place
Peers Technology College, Oxford, Oxfordshire
3rd Place
Stantonbury Campus, Milton Keynes, Buckinghamshire

1999 Be Your Best Fox FM Oxford Rock Challenge Day Two
The Apollo Theatre, Oxford, Oxfordshire
Wednesday 10 February

1st Place
Sir William Ramsay School, Hazlemere, Buckinghamshire
2nd Place
Headington School, Oxford, Oxfordshire
3rd Place
Lord Williams's School, Thame, Oxfordshire

1999 Get Real Be Your Best Power FM Southampton Rock Challenge
Southampton Guildhall, Southampton, Hampshire
Thursday 25 February

1st Place
Osborne Middle School, East Cowes, Isle of Wight
2nd Place
Wildern School Seniors, Hedge End, Hampshire
3rd Place
Cantell Secondary School, Southampton, Hampshire - It's Just an Illusion

1999 Lifestyle Viking FM Be Your Best Hull Rock Challenge
Hull City Hall, Hull
Monday 1 March

1st Place
Driffield School, Driffield, East Riding of Yorkshire
2nd Place
Cottingham High School, Cottingham, East Riding of Yorkshire
3rd Place
South Hunsley School, Melton, East Riding of Yorkshire

1999 Lifestyle Viking FM Be Your Best Grimsby Rock Challenge
Grimsby Auditorium, Grimsby, North East Lincolnshire
Wednesday 3 March

1st Place
Healing Comprehensive School, Healing, North East Lincolnshire
2nd Place
Woldgate School, Pocklington, East Riding of Yorkshire
3rd Place
The Lindsey School, Cleethorpes, North East Lincolnshire

1999 On the Beat Galaxy 102 Be Your Best Manchester Rock Challenge
Bridgewater Hall, Manchester
Tuesday 16 March

1st Place
Astley St Mary's School, Astley, Manchester
2nd Place
George Tomlinson School, Kearsley, Bolton
3rd Place
Stainburn School, Workington, Cumbria

1999 Be Your Best Downtown Radio Belfast Rock Challenge
Waterfront Hall, Belfast
Thursday 18 March

1st Place
Ashfield Girls' High School Belfast
2nd Place
Our Lady of Mercy School, Belfast
3rd Place
St Joseph's School, Belfast

1999 Be Your Best The Pulse Bradford Rock Challenge
St George's Hall, Bradford, West Yorkshire
Monday 22 March

1st Place
City of Leeds School, Leeds, West Yorkshire
2nd Place
Thornton Grammar School, Bradford, West Yorkshire
3rd Place
Ralph Thoresby High School, Leeds, West Yorkshire

1999 Be Your Best Rock Challenge Northern Grand Final
Grimsby Auditorium, Grimsby, North East Lincolnshire
Thursday 24 March

1st Place
South Hunsley School, Melton, East Riding of Yorkshire
2nd Place
Woldgate School, Pocklington, East Riding of Yorkshire
3rd Place
Driffield School, Driffield, East Riding of Yorkshire

1999 Be Your Best Rock Challenge Southern Grand Final
Portsmouth Guildhall, Portsmouth, Hampshire
Saturday 26 March

1st Place
Cantell Secondary School, Southampton, Hampshire - It's Just An Illusion
2nd Place
King Richard School, Portsmouth, Hampshire - Smash the Camera
3rd Place
Ashfield Girls' High School, Belfast

== 2000 ==
2000 Be Your Best Portsmouth Rock Challenge Day One
Portsmouth Guildhall, Portsmouth, Hampshire
Monday 28 February

1st Place
Cowes High School, Cowes, Isle of Wight
2nd Place
King Richard School, Portsmouth, Hampshire
3rd Place
Crookhorn Community School, Waterlooville, Hampshire

2000 Be Your Best Portsmouth Rock Challenge Day Two
Portsmouth Guildhall, Portsmouth, Hampshire
Tuesday 29 February

1st Place
King Richard School, Portsmouth, Hampshire
2nd Place
City of Portsmouth Girls' School, Portsmouth, Hampshire
3rd Place
Mayville High School, Southsea, Hampshire

2000 Be Your Best Southampton Rock Challenge
Southampton Guildhall, Southampton, Hampshire
Thursday 2 March

1st Place
Brune Park Community School, Gosport, Hampshire
2nd Place
Frogmore Community School, Yateley, Hampshire
3rd Place
Wildern School Juniors, Hedge End, Hampshire

2000 Be Your Best Eastbourne Rock Challenge
Eastbourne Congress Theatre, Eastbourne, East Sussex
Wednesday 8 March

1st Place
Ratton School, Eastbourne, East Sussex
2nd Place
Tideway School, Newhaven, East Sussex
3rd Place
Lindfield School, Eastbourne, East Sussex

2000 Be Your Best Bournemouth Rock Challenge
Bournemouth Pavilion, Bournemouth, Dorset
Friday 10 March

1st Place
Lytchett Minster School, Poole, Dorset
2nd Place
Highcliffe School Team One, Christchurch, Dorset
3rd Place
Oakmead College of Technology, Bournemouth, Dorset

2000 Be Your Best Oxford Rock Challenge
Apollo Theatre, Oxford, Oxfordshire
Monday 13 March

1st Place
Peers Technology College, Oxford, Oxfordshire
2nd Place
Lord William's School, Thame, Oxfordshire
3rd Place
Sir William Ramsay School, Hazlemere, Buckinghamshire

2000 Be Your Best Basingstoke Rock Challenge
The Anvil, Basingstoke, Hampshire
Thursday 16 March

1st Place
Wavell School, Farnborough, Hampshire - Hooray for Hollywood
2nd Place
Misbourne School, Great Missenden, Buckinghamshire
3rd Place
St Sampson's School, St Sampson's, Guernsey

2000 Lifestyle Be Your Best Hull Rock Challenge
Hull New Theatre, Hull
Monday 20 March

1st Place
Hornsea School, Hornsea, East Riding of Yorkshire
2nd Place
Cottingham High School, Cottingham, East Riding of Yorkshire
3rd Place
South Hunsley School, Melton, East Riding of Yorkshire

2000 Lifestyle Be Your Best Grimsby Rock Challenge
Grimsby Auditorium, Grimsby, North East Lincolnshire
Wednesday 22 March

1st Place
Hereford School, Westward Ho, North East Lincolnshire
2nd Place
Driffield School, Driffield, East Riding of Yorkshire
3rd Place
Matthew Humberstone School, Cleethorpes, North East Lincolnshire

2000 Be Your Best Croydon Rock Challenge
Ashcroft Theatre, Croydon, Surrey
Monday 27 March

1st Place
Crickhowell High School, Crickhowell, Powys - Actions Speak Louder
2nd Place
Brynmawr School, Brynmawr, Ebbw Vale
3rd Place
The Misbourne School, Great Missenden, Buckinghamshire

2000 Be Your Best Bradford Rock Challenge Day One
St George's Hall, Bradford, West Yorkshire
Wednesday 29 March

1st Place
Ralph Thoresby High School, Leeds, West Yorkshire
2nd Place
John Smeaton High School, Leeds, West Yorkshire
3rd Place
St Michael's College, Leeds, West Yorkshire

2000 Be Your Best Bradford Rock Challenge Day Two
St George's Theatre, Bradford, West Yorkshire
Thursday 30 March

1st Place
City of Leeds School, Leeds, West Yorkshire
2nd Place
Thornton Grammar School, Leeds, West Yorkshire
3rd Place
Stainburn School, Workington, Cumbria

2000 Be Your Best Belfast Rock Challenge
Waterfront Hall, Belfast
Thursday 13 April

1st Place
Ashfield Girls' High School, Belfast
2nd Place
Our Lady of Mercy High School, Belfast
3rd Place
Newbridge Integrated College, Banbridge, County Down

2000 Be Your Best Milton Keynes Rock Challenge
Milton Keynes Theatre, Milton Keynes, Buckinghamshire
Wednesday 3 May

1st Place
Stantonbury Campus, Milton Keynes, Buckinghamshire
2nd Place
Aylesbury High School, Aylesbury, Buckinghamshire
3rd Place
Lord William's School, Thame, Oxfordshire

2000 Be Your Best Rock Challenge Northern Grand Final
Grimsby Auditorium, Grimsby, North East Lincolnshire

1st Place
Ashfield Girls' High School, Belfast
2nd Place
Driffield School, Driffield, East Riding of Yorkshire
3rd Place
Ralph Thoresby High School, Leeds, West Yorkshire

2000 Be Your Best Rock Challenge Southern Grand Final
Portsmouth Guildhall, Portsmouth, Hampshire

1st Place
Crickhowell High School, Crickhowell, Powys - Actions Speak Louder
2nd Place
Stantonbury Campus, Milton Keynes, Buckinghamshire
3rd Place
Wavell School, Farnborough, Hampshire - Hooray for Hollywood

== 2001 ==
2001 Be Your Best Bournemouth Rock Challenge
Bournemouth Pavilion, Bournemouth, Dorset
Monday 26 February

1st Place
Corfe Hills School, Poole, Dorset - It's a Media World
2nd Place
Oakmead College of Technology, Bournemouth, Dorset - Mission Impossible 3
3rd Place
The Blandford School, Blandford Forum, Dorset - Mystical Fantasy

2001 Be Your Best Southampton Rock Challenge Day One
Southampton Guildhall, Southampton, Hampshire
Thursday 1 March

1st Place
Cowes High School, Cowes, Isle of Wight - From Rags to Riches
2nd Place
The Hamble School, Hamble, Hampshire - Disorder and Dance
3rd Place
St Anne's Convent School, Southampton, Hampshire - Television Overload

2001 Be Your Best Southampton Rock Challenge Day Two
Southampton Guildhall, Southampton, Hampshire
Friday 2 March

1st Place
Court Moor School, Fleet, Hampshire - A Better Way - Look To The Future
2nd Place
Lycee 1er Francois, Le Havre, France - Angel?
3rd Place
Wildern School Juniors, Hedge End, Hampshire - Popcorn

2001 Be Your Best Oxford Rock Challenge Day One
Apollo Theatre, Oxford, Oxfordshire
Wednesday 7 March

1st Place
Stantonbury Campus, Milton Keynes, Buckinghamshire - Take the Bull by the Horns
2nd Place
Lord Grey School, Milton Keynes, Buckinghamshire - Out of the Light
3rd Place
Crickhowell High School, Crickhowell, Powys - Carpe Diem - Seize the Moment

2001 Be Your Best Oxford Rock Challenge Day Two
Apollo Theatre, Oxford, Oxfordshire
Thursday 8 March

1st Place
Lord William's School and Chinnor Autistic Unit, Thame, Oxfordshire - The Power of Compulsion
2nd Place
Abingdon College, Abingdon, Oxfordshire - Rehabilitation
3rd Place
Cooper School, Bicester, Oxfordshire - Time Warp

2001 Be Your Best Hemel Hempstead Rock Challenge
Dacorum Pavilion, Hemel Hempstead, Hertfordshire
Wednesday 14 March

1st Place
The Wavell School, Farnborough, Hampshire - Dancing with the Missing
2nd Place
John F Kennedy Catholic School, Hemel Hempstead, Hertfordshire - Take the Power Back
3rd Place
Longdean School, Hemel Hempstead, Hertfordshire - Brave New World

2001 Be Your Best Portsmouth Rock Challenge Day One
Portsmouth Guildhall, Portsmouth, Hampshire
Monday 19 March

1st Place
St Luke's School, Portsmouth, Hampshire - Street Life
2nd Place
Priory School, Portsmouth, Hampshire - Communication Through The Ages
3rd Place
King Richard School Team One, Portsmouth, Hampshire - Are You Scared Yet?

2001 Be Your Best Portsmouth Rock Challenge Day Two
Portsmouth Guildhall, Portsmouth, Hampshire
Tuesday 20 March

1st Place
King Richard School Team Two, Portsmouth, Hampshire - Girlz In The Hood
2nd Place
Mayville High School, Southsea, Hampshire - Nightmare!
3rd Place
Osborne Middle School, East Cowes, Isle of Wight - Are You Sitting Comfortably?

2001 Lifestyle Be Your Best Grimsby Rock Challenge
Grimsby Auditorium, Grimsby, North East Lincolnshire
Wednesday 28 March

1st Place
Matthew Humberstone School, Cleethorpes, North East Lincolnshire - Elementary Balance
2nd Place
Healing Comprehensive School, Grimsby, North East Lincolnshire - Awakening
3rd Place
South Hunsley School, Melton, East Riding of Yorkshire - Conquer Your Dark Side

2001 Lifestyle Be Your Best Bridlington Rock Challenge
The Spa, Bridlington, East Riding of Yorkshire
Friday 30 March

1st Place
Driffield School, Driffield, East Riding of Yorkshire - A Native American Legend
2nd Place
Hornsea School, Hornsea, East Riding of Yorkshire - Best of British
3rd Place
Merlyn Rees High School, Leeds, West Yorkshire - A Higher Level

2001 Be Your Best Belfast Rock Challenge
Waterfront Hall, Belfast
Wednesday 4 April

1st Place
Ashfield Girls' High School, Belfast - The Sky's the Limit
2nd Place
Larkin Community College, Dublin - Garden of Life
3rd Place
Belfast Model School, Belfast - Walk of Life

2001 Be Your Best Bradford Rock Challenge Day One
St George's Hall, Bradford, West Yorkshire
Tuesday 24 April

1st Place
John Smeaton Community High School, Leeds, West Yorkshire - Parental Guidance
2nd Place
Copperfields College, Leeds, West Yorkshire - Descent
3rd Place
Earlsheaton Community High School, Dewsbury, West Yorkshire - The Disappeared

2001 Be Your Best Bradford Rock Challenge Day Two
St George's Hall, Bradford, West Yorkshire
Wednesday 25 April

1st Place
City of Leeds School, Leeds, West Yorkshire - Alpha-Omega
2nd Place
Thornton Grammar School, Bradford, West Yorkshire - The Celebration of Creation
3rd Place
Hanson School, Bradford, West Yorkshire - Nightmare

2001 Be Your Best Carlisle Rock Challenge
The Sands Centre, Carlisle, Cumbria
Friday 4 May

1st Place
Stainburn School, Workington, Cumbria - High Kicking
2nd Place
Peterhead Academy, Peterhead, Aberdeenshire - U.S.A. OK/No Way!
3rd Place
Whitehaven School, Whitehaven, Cumbria - Silva

2001 Be Your Best Croydon Rock Challenge
Ashcroft Theatre, Croydon, Surrey
Wednesday 9 May

1st Place
Davison High School, Worthing, West Sussex - Outraged
2nd Place
Brynmawr School, Brynmawr, Ebbw Vale - War
3rd Place
St Thomas More School, West Grinstead, West Sussex - Life in London

2001 Be Your Best Rock Challenge Southern Region Grand Final
Portsmouth Guildhall, Portsmouth, Hampshire
Monday 21 May

1st Place
King Richard School Team Two, Portsmouth, Hampshire - Girlz In The Hood
2nd Place
The Wavell School, Farnborough, Hampshire - Dancing with the Missing
3rd Place
Davison High School, Worthing, West Sussex - Outraged

2001 Be Your Best Rock Challenge Northern Region Grand Final
Grimsby Auditorium, Grimsby, North East Lincolnshire
Saturday 26 May

1st Place
Ashfield Girls' High School, Belfast - The Sky's the Limit
2nd Place
Thornton Grammar School, Bradford, West Yorkshire - The Celebration of Creation
3rd Place
Driffield School, Driffield, East Riding of Yorkshire - A Native American Legend

== 2002 ==
2002 Be Your Best Aberdeen Rock Challenge
Aberdeen Exhibition and Conference Centre, Aberdeen, Aberdeenshire
Wednesday 13 February

1st Place
Peterhead Academy, Peterhead, Aberdeenshire - When The Boat Comes In
2nd Place
Westhill Academy, Aberdeen, Aberdeenshire - Tribes
3rd Place
Mackie Academy, Stonehaven, Kincardineshire - The Good, The Bad and the Sixties!

2002 Be Your Best Southampton Rock Challenge Day One
Southampton Guildhall, Southampton, Hampshire
Wednesday 27 February

1st Place
Cowes High School, Cowes, Isle of Wight - Elemental
2nd Place
Staunton Park Community School, Havant, Hampshire - Newsflash – Teenagers out of Control!
3rd Place
Solent Middle School, Cowes, Isle of Wight - Exhibiting the Future

2002 Be Your Best Southampton Rock Challenge Day Two
Southampton Guildhall, Southampton, Hampshire
Thursday 28 February

1st Place
Ryde High School, Ryde, Isle of Wight - Caped Fear
2nd Place
Highcliffe School Team Two, Christchurch, Dorset - Love and Rejection
3rd Place
Lycee Francois Premier, Le Havre, France - Nobody’s Perfect

2002 Be Your Best Southampton Rock Challenge Day Three
Southampton Guildhall, Southampton, Hampshire
Friday 1 March

1st Place
Regents Park Juniors, Southampton, Hampshire - Around the World in 8 Minutes
2nd Place
Wildern School Seniors, Hedge End, Hampshire - Rodeo Rock
3rd Place
St Sampson's Secondary School, St Sampson's, Guernsey - Sweets Ain’t What They Seem To Be!

2002 Be Your Best Portsmouth Rock Challenge Day One
Portsmouth Guildhall, Portsmouth, Hampshire
Tuesday 5 March

1st Place
Crickhowell High School, Crickhowell, Powys - The Shape of Things To Come
2nd Place
Park Community School, Leigh Park, Hampshire - P.O.P (Product or People)
3rd Place
King Richard School Team One, Portsmouth, Hampshire - Corrida de Toros

2002 Be Your Best Portsmouth Rock Challenge Day Two
Portsmouth Guildhall, Portsmouth, Hampshire
Wednesday 6 March

1st Place
City of Portsmouth Girls’ School, Portsmouth, Hampshire - Cry Freedom
2nd Place
Frogmore Community College Team A, Yateley, Hampshire - Faces of Conflict
3rd Place
Mayville High School, Southsea, Hampshire - A Changing World

2002 Be Your Best Oxford Rock Challenge Day One
Apollo Theatre, Oxford, Oxfordshire
Thursday 7 March

1st Place
Cheney School, Oxford, Oxfordshire - Dreams or Nightmares
2nd Place
Headington School, Oxford, Oxfordshire - Human Cloning
3rd Place
Cranbourne School - The Rhythm Has My Soul

2002 Be Your Best Oxford Rock Challenge Day Two
Apollo Theatre, Oxford, Oxfordshire
Friday 8 March

1st Place
Sir William Ramsay School, Hazlemere, Buckinghamshire - The Outsider
2nd Place
Abingdon and Witney College, Abingdon, Oxfordshire - Rouge
3rd Place
Brynmawr School, Brynmawr, Ebbw Vale - ”The Drugs Don’t Work”

2002 Be Your Best Bournemouth Rock Challenge
Bournemouth Pavilion, Bournemouth, Dorset
Monday 11 March

1st Place
Highcliffe Lower School, Christchurch, Dorset - Mind Games
2nd Place
Highcliffe Team A, Christchurch, Dorset - Always Remember
3rd Place
Rossmore Community College, Poole, Dorset - Choice of Direction

2002 Be Your Best Crawley Rock Challenge
The Hawth Theatre, Crawley, West Sussex
Monday 11 March

1st Place
Davison High School, Worthing, West Sussex - Ad Extremum
2nd Place
Bognor Regis Community College, Bognor Regis, West Sussex - Hatch, Match and Despatch
3rd Place
Filsham Valley School, St Leonard's-on-Sea, East Sussex - What’s Your Talent?

2002 Be Your Best Croydon Rock Challenge
Ashcroft Theatre, Croydon, Surrey
Thursday 14 March

1st Place
Frogmore Community College Team B, Yateley, Hampshire - Hand of Hope
2nd Place
Wavell School, Farnborough, Hampshire - Destiny
3rd Place
The Misbourne School, Great Missenden, Buckinghamshire - O’mnis Saga

2002 Be Your Best Bradford Rock Challenge Day One
St George's Hall, Bradford, West Yorkshire
Tuesday 19 March

1st Place
Thornton Grammar School, Bradford, West Yorkshire - Antony and Cleopatra
2nd Place
Buttershaw High School, Bradford, West Yorkshire - The Same World - But A World Apart
3rd Place
Hanson School, Bradford, West Yorkshire - One Vision

2002 Be Your Best Bradford Rock Challenge Day Two
St George's Hall, Bradford, West Yorkshire
Wednesday 20 March

1st Place
South Leeds Art College, Leeds, West Yorkshire - Dreams
2nd Place
Matthew Humberstone School, Cleethorpes, North East Lincolnshire - Don't Stop the Carnival
3rd Place
St Joseph's RC College, Bradford, West Yorkshire - Take a Trip

2002 Lifestyle Be Your Best Bridlington Rock Challenge
The Spa, Bridlington, East Riding of Yorkshire
Friday 12 April

1st Place
Hornsea School, Hornsea, East Riding of Yorkshire - Perseverance Pays
2nd Place
Driffield School, Driffield, East Riding of Yorkshire - The Fire of London
3rd Place
South Hunsley School, Melton, East Riding of Yorkshire - The Chinese Years

2002 Lifestyle Be Your Best Grimsby Rock Challenge
Grimsby Auditorium, Grimsby, North East Lincolnshire
Monday 15 April

1st Place
Healing Comprehensive, Grimsby, North East Lincolnshire - A Higher State of Innocence
2nd Place
Hereford Technology School, Grimsby, North East Lincolnshire - Celebrate South Africa
3rd Place
Matthew Humberstone School, Cleethorpes, North East Lincolnshire - Don't Stop the Carnival

2002 Lifestyle Be Your Best Hull Rock Challenge
Hull Ice Arena, Hull
Wednesday 17 April

1st Place
Archbishop Thurstan School, Hull - Just Be Yourself
2nd Place
Andrew Marvell School, Hull - The Time Machine
3rd Place
St Mary's College, Hull - A Woman's World

2002 Be Your Best Hemel Hempstead Rock Challenge
Dacorum Theatre, Hemel Hempstead, Hertfordshire
Thursday 25 April

1st Place
Kings Langley School, Kings Langley, Hertfordshire - Know Your Limits
2nd Place
Vandyke Upper School, Leighton Buzzard, Bedfordshire - Through the Eyes of a Child
3rd Place
Aylesbury High School, Aylesbury, Buckinghamshire - Under Pressure

2002 Be Your Best Belfast Rock Challenge
Waterfront Hall, Belfast
Monday 29 April

1st Place
Ashfield Girls' High School, Belfast - There's Only One You
2nd Place
Ballee Community High School, Ballymena, County Antrim - Get Connected
3rd Place
Holy Trinity College, Cookstown, County Tyrone - Oblivion Interrupted

2002 Be Your Best Carlisle Rock Challenge
The Sands Centre, Carlisle, Cumbria
Friday 3 May

1st Place
Stainburn School, Workington, Cumbria - The Power Within
2nd Place
Rhyddings High School, Oswaldtwistle, Lancashire - Herstory
3rd Place
Cockermouth School, Cockermouth, Cumbria - Looking for a Way Out

2002 Be Your Best Rock Challenge Southern Region Grand Final
Portsmouth Guildhall, Portsmouth, Hampshire
Friday 17 May

1st Place
Ryde High School, Ryde, Isle of Wight - Caped Fear
2nd Place
Sir William Ramsay School, Hazlemere, Buckinghamshire - The Outsider
3rd Place
City of Portsmouth Girls' School, Portsmouth, Hampshire - Cry Freedom

2002 Be Your Best Rock Challenge Northern Region Grand Final
Barbican Centre, York
Friday 17 May

1st Place
Thornton Grammar School, Bradford, West Yorkshire - Antony and Cleopatra
2nd Place
Hornsea School, Hornsea, East Riding of Yorkshire - Perseverance Pays
3rd Place
Ashfield Girls' High School, Belfast - There's Only One You

== 2003 ==
2003 Be Your Best Aberdeen Rock Challenge
Aberdeen Exhibition and Conference Centre, Aberdeen, Aberdeenshire
Thursday 13 February

1st Place
Torry Academy, Aberdeen, Aberdeenshire - Choose Life
2nd Place
Peterhead Academy, Peterhead, Aberdeenshire - G.M.
3rd Place
Oldmachar Academy, Bridge of Don, Aberdeenshire - Sounds Like Teen Spirit

2003 Be Your Best Bournemouth Rock Challenge
Bournemouth Pavilion, Bournemouth, Dorset
Monday 3 March

1st Place
Lytchett Minster School, Poole, Dorset - To the Land of Milk and Honey
2nd Place
Highcliffe School D.C., Christchurch, Dorset - Yomigaeru
3rd Place
Oakmead College of Technology, Bournemouth, Dorset - Into the World of Temptation

2003 Be Your Best Southampton Rock Challenge Day One
Southampton Guildhall, Southampton, Hampshire
Wednesday 5 March

1st Place
Barton Peveril College, Eastleigh, Hampshire - Freedom of Expression
2nd Place
Lycee Francois Premier, Le Havre, France - The One Who Stole the Light
3rd Place
St Vincent College, Gosport, Hampshire - Adverts Reaction

2003 Be Your Best Southampton Rock Challenge Day Two
Southampton Guildhall, Southampton, Hampshire
Thursday 6 March

1st Place
Hamble School, Hamble, Hampshire - Image
2nd Place
Richard Aldworth School, Basingstoke, Hampshire - Overcoming the Barricades
3rd Place
Brune Park Community College, Gosport, Hampshire - Unity Through Music

2003 Be Your Best Southampton Rock Challenge Day Three
Southampton Guildhall, Southampton, Hampshire
Friday 7 March

1st Place
Cantell School, Southampton, Hampshire - On the Eighth Day
2nd Place
Cowes High School, Cowes, Isle of Wight - Re-Volution
3rd Place
Regents Park School Juniors, Southampton, Hampshire - The Power of Imagination

2003 Be Your Best Crawley Rock Challenge Day One
The Hawth, Crawley, West Sussex
Monday 10 March

1st Place
Wavell School, Farnborough, Hampshire - Legacy
2nd Place
Davison High School for Girls, Worthing, West Sussex - 8 Percent!
3rd Place
Bognor Regis Community College, Bognor Regis, West Sussex - Legends

2003 Be Your Best Crawley Rock Challenge Day Two
The Hawth, Crawley, West Sussex
Tuesday 11 March

1st Place
Tideway School, Newhaven, East Sussex - Splish Splash
2nd Place
Bexhill High School, Bexhill-on-Sea, East Sussex - Unknown Destiny
3rd Place
Filsham Valley School, St Leonard's-on-Sea, East Sussex - Where 2 Now?

2003 Be Your Best Croydon Rock Challenge
Ashcroft Theatre, Croydon, Surrey
Thursday 13 March

1st Place
Frogmore Community College, Yateley, Hampshire - Life's a Circus
2nd Place
Brynmawr School, Brynmawr, Ebbw Vale - War With No Winners
3rd Place
Crickhowell High School, Crickhowell, Powys - Every Picture Tells a Story

2003 Be Your Best Bradford Rock Challenge Day One
St George's Hall, Bradford, West Yorkshire
Wednesday 19 March

1st Place
South Leeds Arts College, Leeds, West Yorkshire - Elements of Power
2nd Place
Buttershaw High School, Bradford, West Yorkshire - Enigma
3rd Place
Earlsheaton High School, Dewsbury, West Yorkshire - Street Harmony

== 2018 ==
The National Final of the 2018 Tour was held in Rotherham on 14 July. First place was awarded to LeAF Studio, Bournemouth, with their theme 'Through Innocent Eyes', a take on the story of The Boy in the Striped Pyjamas and offered education on the events of the Holocaust through performance. The finale of their 8-minute performance saw scenery close in front of students, revealing harrowing numbers of those killed in concentration camps based on their citizenship, faith or sexual orientation, and the message 'DIFFERENCES SHOULD NOT DIVIDE US'.

== See also ==
- Rock Eisteddfod Challenge
