= John Gilderdale =

Church of England clergyman and religious writer

The Reverend John Gilderdale
- Vicar of Stourton Caundle
- Diocese: Salisbury

Personal details
- Born: 1802
- Died: 25 September 1864 (aged 61–62)
- Denomination: Anglican

John Gilderdale (1802–1864) was an Anglican divine.

== Life ==
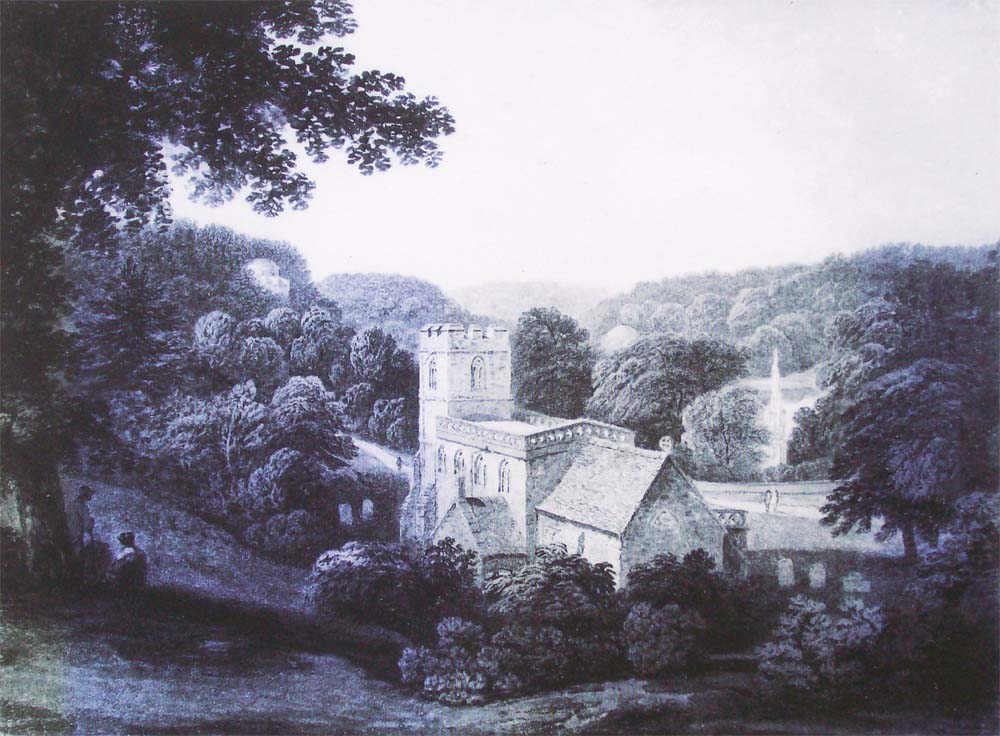
St. Peter's Church, Stourton Caundle

John Gilderdale was educated at Howden Grammar School in Yorkshire. His tastes were early disposed towards a seafaring life, but he eventually adopted a literary and scholastic profession. On the completion of his schooling he matriculated from St. Catharine's Hall, Cambridge, where he graduated BA in 1826, proceeded to his degree of MA in 1830, and to that of BD in 1853. He proceeded "ad eundem" in the University of Oxford on 25 June 1847.

After leaving Cambridge, he was appointed lecturer of the parish church of Halifax, Yorkshire, through the influence of Thomas Musgrave, archdeacon of Craven, which office he held from 1842 to 1847. This office he resigned on being presented to the living of Walthamstow. In 1848 he became curate of Upper Clapton, London, and from 1849 to 1863 he became the third headmaster was of Forest School, Walthamstow, where he successfully halted the decline in student enrollment. By his wife, Rebecca, he had at least one child. His son, John Smith Gilderdale, was also a teacher at the school.

Gilderdale was made incumbent of Stourton Caundle, Dorsetshire, in 1863, and died there on 25 September 1864.

== Works ==
1. An Essay on Natural Religion and Revelation, considered with regard to the legitimate use and proper limitation of Reason, London, 1837, 8vo. This work is dedicated to William Dealtry, rector of Clapham and chancellor of the diocese of Winchester.
2. A Course of Family Prayers for one month, with Short Forms for several occasions, dedicated to the Ven. Charles Musgrave, Prebendary of York and Vicar of Halifax. London, 1838, 12mo.
3. A Letter to Lord Brougham on National Education, London, 1838, 8vo.
