= Matt King (cricketer) =

English cricketer (born 1994)

Personal information
- Full name: Matthew John King
- Born: 25 February 1994 (age 32); Basingstoke, Hampshire, England
- Batting: Right-handed
- Bowling: Right-arm fast-medium

Domestic team information
- Years: Team
- 2013–2014: Hampshire (squad no. 31)

Career statistics
| Competition | List A |
|---|---|
| Matches | 2 |
| Runs scored | 8 |
| Batting average | 8.00 |
| 100s/50s | –/– |
| Top score | 8 |
| Balls bowled | 48 |
| Wickets | 0 |
| Bowling average | – |
| 5 wickets in innings | – |
| 10 wickets in match | – |
| Best bowling | – |
| Catches/stumpings | –/– |
- Source: Cricinfo, 21 July 2025

Matthew John King (born 25 February 1994) is an English former cricketer.

King was born in Basingstoke in February 1994. He was educated in Basingstoke at Fort Hill Community School. He was member of the cricket academy at Hampshire, King made his senior debut for Hampshire in a List A one-day match against Bangladesh A at the Rose Bowl in 2013, which Hampshire won by 8 runs; he was dismissed for 8 runs by Robiul Islam in Hampshire's innings of 223 all out, while with his right-arm fast-medium bowling, he bowled three wicketless overs. He made a further one-day appearance for Hampshire in 2014, playing against Sri Lanka A, again going wicketless. King subsequently toured the United Arab Emirates with the Marylebone Cricket Club Young Cricketers in 2015, who played a number of first-class counties in pre-season friendly matches. After a period playing club cricket for Weybridge in Surrey, King joined Basingstoke and North Hants in 2016, a club where he had spent his youth.

== External list ==
- Matt King at Cricinfo
