= CBEC =

CBEC may refer to:

- Central Board of Excise and Customs, India
- Casterton Business and Enterprise College, Stamford, Lincolnshire, England
- CBEC-FM, a re-broadcaster of CBCS-FM in Ontario, Canada
- Cranbourne Business and Enterprise College, Basingstoke, Hampshire, England
