= Crestwood Community School =

School in Eastleigh, Hampshire, England

Location
- Shakespeare Road; Boyatt Wood; Eastleigh, Hampshire, SO50 4FZ; England
- 50.9788°N 1.3612°W

Information
- Type: Community school
- Local authority: Hampshire
- Department for Education URN: 116445 Tables
- Ofsted: Reports
- Head Teacher: Krista Dawkins
- Gender: Coeducational
- Age: 11 to 16
- Enrolment: 1,310 as of December 2022
- Colours: Burgundy and Blue/Gold
- Website: http://crestwood.hants.sch.uk/

Crestwood Community School (known as Crestwood College prior to its name change in August 2017) is a coeducational secondary school, located in Eastleigh in the English county of Hampshire. Crestwood is a split-site school, operating two campuses on Shakespeare Road and Cherbourg Road.

It is a community school administered by Hampshire County Council, which coordinates the school's admissions. The school specialises in Business and Enterprise.

Crestwood Community School offers GCSEs and BTECs as programmes of study for pupils.

The school operates two SEN resourced provisions: a Specific Learning Difficulties provision on the Shakespeare Road campus and a Social, Emotional and Mental Health (SEMH) needs provision on the Cherbourg Road campus. The SEMH provision is delivered in partnership with Cherbourg Primary School.

In March 2016, it was announced that the nearby Quilley School would be closed and that Crestwood would expand — as of September 2016 — to deliver 11–16 education across two sites.

== Notable former pupils ==
- Scott Mills, radio DJ
