= Boyatt Wood =

Village and civil parish in Hampshire, England

Coordinates: 50.98°N 1.36°W

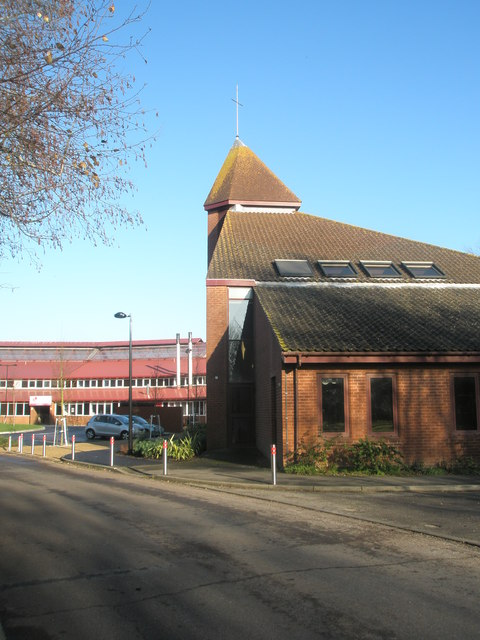
- St Peter's Church

- Location within Hampshire
- Area: 2.067 km^{2} (0.798 sq mi)
- Population: 7,333 (2024 estimate)
  - Density: 3,548/km^{2} (9,190/sq mi)
- Civil parish: Eastleigh Town
- District: Eastleigh
- Shire county: Hampshire
- Region: South East
- Country: England
- Sovereign state: United Kingdom
- Police: Hampshire and Isle of Wight
- Fire: Hampshire and Isle of Wight
- Ambulance: South Central

Boyatt Wood is a small residential area north-west of Eastleigh in Hampshire, England named locally after the wooded area to the south of Boyatt Lane which connects the area to the village of Otterbourne. On 1 April 2021 it became a civil parish, In 2024 the parish had an estimated population of 7333. being formed from the unparished area of Eastleigh. On 1 April 2026 the parish was abolished and merged with Eastleigh Town.

St Peter's Church is an Anglican parish church in the area. Boyatt Wood Allotment Site contains 61 gardening plots.

A local secondary school, Crestwood Community School, was where Scott Mills was taught.

One amateur football team, the Boyatt Wood FC, has been based in the area since 2012.

National cycle network route 23 runs through Boyatt Wood.
