= Vandyke Upper School =

Location
- Vandyke Road; Leighton Buzzard, Bedfordshire, LU7 3DY; England; 51°56′14″N 0°38′42″W

Information
- Type: Academy
- Motto: Everyone matters
- Established: 1976
- Local authority: Central Bedfordshire Council
- Department for Education URN: 137169 Tables
- Ofsted: Reports
- Head teacher: Leah Ferguson-Moore
- Staff: 150 approx.
- Years offered: 9-13
- Gender: Coeducational
- Age range: 13-18
- Enrolment: 1,500 approx.
- Colour: Burgundy
- Website: www.vandyke.beds.sch.uk

== Lessons ==
Vandyke upper school host a variety of different subjects including,

- English
- Maths
- Science (double)
- Science (triple)
- History
- Geography
- Music
- Design & Technology
- Fashion and Textiles
- Catering
- Etc.

Vandyke Upper School and Community College is an academy school and sixth form in Leighton Buzzard, Bedfordshire, England. As of 2022, there are approximately 1500 students in both the sixth form at Vandyke, and compulsory education.

== History ==
The school was opened in 1976 as a comprehensive school for 13- to 18-year-olds.

During the Ofsted inspection that took place in December 2006, Vandyke Upper School achieved a Grade 2 (Good) rating. The school was inspected again by Ofsted in 2013, the overall result being Grade 3 (Requires improvement). This was primarily attributed to unsatisfactory exam results and mixed quality of teaching. Since this inspection, Ofsted have upgraded the school back to a `good` rating.

== Achievements ==
For several years Vandyke has been a participant of the Rock Challenge, a dance and drama event promoting healthy lifestyles amongst pupils. In 2005 Vandyke achieved Sports College status and was granted £114,000 from the Government's Big Lottery Fund in 2006, providing out of hours sporting activities. In 2007 the school was awarded the Government Charter Mark for excellence in customer service. Vandyke met 63 exacting standards of customer service to qualify for the award. The Government's Key performance indicator, a program that logs school's GCSE and Key Stage Two exam performances, has placed Vandyke's results in the top 25% of schools across the country. According to the log, 61 per cent of Vandyke students attained A* to C grades in their GCSEs in 2007.

== Charity ==
Vandyke Upper School donated forty-eight computers to Kabalega Secondary School, in Uganda. Twelve more computers went to an NGO, the Link Development Community, also of Uganda, who work to improve education within the country. Annually, since 2005, Vandyke has held fund raising events for the charity, Smile Malawi. Smile Malawi is a charity aimed at improving educatory standards for children in Malawi. In 2008 Vandyke Upper School raised over £2000 for Smile Malawi and £3200 in 2017.

== Vandyke Education Trust ==
The Governing Body of Vandyke Upper School is proposing a change of school category from a community school to a foundation school which will acquire a charitable trust to be called the Vandyke Education Trust. This is a new type of school that, while still being part of the local authority, has the opportunity to be supported by a Charitable Trust. To provide continuity and stability for the Trust, the Governors of Vandyke Upper School proposed to formalise, through a Trust, their partnerships with:

- The University of Bedfordshire
- Central Bedfordshire College of FE
- MK Dons Sport and Education Trust
- BEAerospace
- VT Education
- Central Bedfordshire Council
