= Lytchett Minster School =

Location
- Lytchett Minster; Poole, Dorset, BH16 6JD; England
- Coordinates: 50°44′28″N 2°03′31″W

Information
- Type: Foundation school
- Local authority: Dorset
- Department for Education URN: 113863 Tables
- Ofsted: Reports
- Headmaster: Andrew Mead
- Gender: Coeducational
- Age: 11 to 18
- Enrolment: 1400
- Houses: Kimmeridge, Wealden, Portland, Gault, Purbeck, Agglestone
- Website: http://www.lytchett.org.uk/

Lytchett Minster School is a comprehensive school, with about 1,400 students aged 11 to 18, and 100 teachers, in Lytchett Minster, just outside Upton, 4 miles (6 km) from Poole, Dorset, England.

The school uses a house system to arrange the students. The head of house remains the same person for each pupil for the whole first 5 years of school. In the upper school there is no house system.

== Lower school ==
The lower school comprises the compulsory education pupils, years 7 to 11. School pupils wear uniform, whilst sixth formers can wear office-suitable clothing. The uniform includes striped ties, blue and white pinstriped blouses/shirts and a navy blue blazer.

In activities such as sports day, the houses compete for the sports day trophy. There are also inter-house sporting activities, such as football, netball, rugby and other sports. There is a trophy for most of these sporting events, as well as the inter-house chess contest. The houses are named after geological deposits in the local Dorset area. Their names and colours are:

- Wealden - Green
- Kimmeridge - Purple
- Purbeck - Blue
- Portland - Red
- Gault - Yellow
- Agglestone - Amber

The lower school are involved in theatrical productions, such as Godspell and The Sound of Music with the sixth form and years 10 and 11 playing the lead roles. In 2007, all years were involved in a theatrical production of Barnum. In 2009, they performed Alice in Wonderland. There have also been lower school productions such as Ernie's Incredible Hallucinations (2007), Blood Brothers (2008), Oliver! (2009) and Romeo and Juliet (2009) whilst entering the Rock Challenge. In 2010 Lytchett Minster School ran the school production of Chess. Also in early 2011 Lytchett Minster school ran the school production of West Side Story.

== Sixth form ==
The school has a sixth form, years 12 and 13, of students studying for, among others, GCE 'A' Level exams. The sixth form has its own centre, housing the common room, offices of the head and deputy head of sixth form, sixth form staff room and 2 classrooms. There is also a sixth form study room in the school's manor house building which was opened in September 2006; it contains a computer room, work room and small reference library.

The sixth form student structure has a head boy and head girl with 6 deputies in year 13. Each of the 6 deputies chairs a sixth form committee. In the year 2006/7 these committees were; social and common room, lower school liaison, public relations and media, cultural, sports and charity, and fund raising. There is also the sixth form forum which is made up of one elected student from each tutor group, the head boy and girl and the chairperson of the school council.

== Achievements ==
The school uses its arts college status to improve its musical and dramatic performances. The school often scores well in Battle of the bands, a county-wide competition where amateur bands play to impress a crowd and judges. The school also performs in Rock Challenge UK, and has reached as high as 2nd place over the whole of England but has come 1st on many occasions in the sub-category of "Best Costume."

== History ==
=== Manor House ===
In 1890 Baronet and MP Sir Elliott Lees bought land in Dorset and moved into South Lytchett Manor. The Manor was requisitioned in WW2, serving as the battery headquarters of an anti-aircraft defence regiment. It had 29 bedrooms and 13 bathrooms. Ater Sir John Lees' death in 1955, his heir, Sir Thomas Lees, decided to sell rather than renovate, and the Lees family moved to Post Green House, then a farmhouse on the estate. It was bought by the local Council and became Lytchett Minster Secondary Modern School.

=== Fires ===
The school was targeted by an arsonist in June 2000, just before the turn of the academic year. The fire was started in a science lab, and spread (with the aid of the gas filled supply taps to all science labs) to devastate the whole of the science, maths, and humanities blocks, including the school theatre. As the building was completely destroyed, and an investigation had to be undertaken by police and the fire brigade, the school was forced to remain closed, adding an extra two weeks onto the six-week summer holiday. The blocks that were destroyed were replaced with temporary classrooms on the other side of the playing field (known as "the village"). This led to problems, such as the need for travelling time between lessons, to enable pupils to walk the 400 metres (1,300 ft) from the main site to the 'village' without missing education time and also that the government has to pay the land owners to use the land. After many delays, involving disagreements over budget and design, and the discovery of a rare type of protected tree on the site, a new building has recently been completed, which will replace the "village". This building houses the science labs, maths and humanities departments, plus two house areas (Wealden and Kimmeridge).

A fire on 27 December 2012, thought to have been started by a lightning strike, destroyed the school's creative arts block. The resulting classrooms shortage meant students had to take turns attending some classes. Temporary classrooms were provided using portable structures that were used as athlete accommodation at the 2012 Summer Olympics. The creative arts block was eventually rebuilt in March 2016.

=== April 23rd Protest ===
On 23 April 2021, a protest on the school field took place throughout the school day. The protest had been triggered by a video shown to students in tutor where a female member of staff allegedly blamed the length of girls skirts which she believed encouraged "sexual behaviour" from male students. The headmaster would go on to apologise to students and parents on the same day.

== Building plans ==
The building for the new dining hall, science, humanities and maths classrooms started at the end of October 2006. Large areas of the school site were sealed off for building work. On 24 February 2009, students moved into the new building named the MSH Block. On 20 May 2009, there was an open evening for students to show their parents around the new building block.
