= Cranbourne School =

Cranbourne

Location
- Wessex Close; Basingstoke, Hampshire, RG21 3NP; England; 51°15′20″N 1°06′00″W

Information
- Type: Community school
- Motto: Excellence In Everything
- Established: 1967
- Local authority: Hampshire
- Department for Education URN: 116432 Tables
- Ofsted: Reports
- Headteacher: Sarah Conlon
- Staff: 70
- Gender: Coeducational
- Age: 11 to 16
- Enrolment: 987
- Capacity: 1300
- Houses: Andrew Lloyd Webber House, Austen House, Thomson House and White House
- Colours: Navy blue and white, light blue, black
- Website: www.cranbourne.hants.sch.uk

Cranbourne is a co-educational secondary school in Basingstoke, northern Hampshire, England. The school serves Key Stage 3 and Key Stage 4 students between the ages of 11 and 16. The school follows the National Curriculum.

== History ==
Cranbourne was founded as the Cranbourne Bi-Lateral School in 1967 as a bilateral school for 11- to 18-year-olds, on the site of a former nursery. It became a comprehensive school in 1972 following the establishment of Queen Mary's Sixth Form College, It was renamed Cranbourne Business and Enterprise College in September 2004.

Cranbourne (or CBEC) became the first of two Business and Enterprise Colleges in Hampshire in 2004 and has scola architecture refurbished in 2006. CBEC is separated into nine blocks and has a small swimming pool and a three-story science block (C block).

The school changed its name back to Cranbourne (from CBEC) in September 2018.

In July 2023 parts of the school ceased to be used after they were found to be made from reinforced autoclaved aerated concrete and thus potentially at risk of collapse.

== Head Teachers ==
- Mr Willis - 1967-1971
- Mr Duke - 1971-1981
- Terry Ayres - 1981-1997
- Ann Morrison - 1997-2006
- Betty Elikins - 2006-2016
- Malcolm Christian - (Interim) 2016-2018
- Jane Alpin - 2018–2023
- Sarah Conlon - 2023–present

== Amalgamating with Fort Hill Community School ==
At the end of the 2015-2016 academic year, Headmistress Betty Elkins resigned and Jane Aplin took over as Head. There are plans to merge the students of Fort Hill Community School with CBEC's due to low numbers at Fort Hill. At the county councils decision in June 2017, it was recommended and approved that Fort Hill will close on 31 August 2017. All Fort Hill pupils will start at Cranbourne in September 2017.

== Alumni ==
- Shelley Conn, actor
- Alex Thomson, journalist and newscaster
