= Highcliffe School =

Location
- Parkside; Highcliffe, Dorset, BH23 4QD; England; 50°44′48″N 1°43′19″W

Information
- Type: Academy
- Local authority: Bournemouth, Christchurch and Poole
- Department for Education URN: 136763 Tables
- Ofsted: Reports
- Headteacher: Patrick B. Earnshaw
- Gender: Co-educational
- Age: 11 to 18
- Enrolment: 1,535
- Colours: Purple; Black for year 11
- Website: https://www.highcliffe.school/

Highcliffe School is a co-educational secondary school and sixth form located in Highcliffe-on-Sea (near Christchurch) in the English county of Dorset.

== Features ==
The school has a £4,000,000 technology block, ICT and science departments, and plasma TV screens all around the school for displaying messages and announcements.

Building work has finished on a fitness suite, which PE students have access to, containing fitness training machines and weights.

The school Music Department has access to a technology room, which contains computers loaded with Cubase music programs and Sibelius software (a score-writing program). It also features keyboards connected to these computers, acting as speakers and MIDI-input devices.

== Specialism ==
Highcliffe School specialises in languages, and teaches:

- Japanese (as an optional extra curricular subject)
- Spanish
- French
- Chinese (as an optional extra curricular subject)
- Latin (as an optional extracurricular subject)

The school also offers "twilight lessons" for parents and other adults to learn languages after normal school hours.

== Controversies ==
Former teacher Adam Gutteridge was charged with ten counts of sexual assault and jailed for 4 years

On September 2025, a parents newsletter came out addressing online allegations of the school allowing to use litter boxes and identify as animals.

P.earnshaw dismissed these claims, however it still made it to national news outlets.
