= Hornsea School and Language College =

School in the East Riding of Yorkshire, England

Location
- Eastgate; Hornsea, East Riding of Yorkshire, HU18 1DW; England; 53.91388°N 0.17402°W

Information
- Type: Community school
- Motto: Non Nobis Solum Nati (We are not born for ourselves alone)
- Established: 1958
- Department for Education URN: 118082 Tables
- Ofsted: Reports
- Head teacher: S Ostler
- Age: 11 to 18
- Enrolment: 1,252
- Website: https://www.hslc.co.uk

Hornsea School and Language College is situated in the small seaside town of Hornsea in the East Riding of Yorkshire, England. It is a secondary comprehensive and takes pupils from Hornsea and the surrounding area.

The school was built in 1958 on the site of Hornsea House, with 500 pupils. This included an institute of further education. By 1971 the school population had grown to over 1,000 and became a Comprehensive School. It has a student support centre to help students with bullying and social issues. The sixth form college was built on a part of the school playing fields as a self-sufficient building comprising a common room, a library and computer room, a conference room and several teaching rooms.

Hornsea School & Language College achieved specialist Language College status in 2004, and holds the Healthy Schools Award

Alumni

Hornsea School and & Language College has dedicated part of a school corridor to illustrating successful former students.
