= Quilley School =

Location
- Cherbourg Road; Eastleigh, Hampshire, SO50 5EL; England; 50°57′42″N 1°21′40″W

Information
- Type: Community school
- Established: 1963
- Founder: Edward John Quilley
- Closed: 2016
- Local authority: Hampshire
- Department for Education URN: 116425 Tables
- Ofsted: Reports
- Gender: Coeducational
- Age: 11 to 16
- Website: http://www.quilley.hants.sch.uk/

Quilley School, originally called Alderman Quilley, was a secondary school in Eastleigh, Hampshire, England. The enrollment in 2016 was 570 pupils.

The school was founded by Edward John Quilley in 1963, opened in 1964 as a comprehensive mixed secondary school for 11- to 16-year-olds. The Head was Mrs Hayter.

In March 2016 it was announced that the school would be merging with the Crestwood College for Business and Enterprise as of September 2016. Falling enrollment and low exam results over the past three years were cited as the reasons for the merger. The former Quilley site is now the Cherbourg Campus of the merged schools.
