= Matthew Arnold School, Oxford =

Secondary school near Oxford, England

Matthew Arnold School

Location
- Arnolds Way; Oxford, Oxfordshire, OX2 9JE; England; 51°44′35″N 1°18′11″W

Information
- Type: Academy
- Motto: Success For Everyone
- Established: 1958; 68 years ago
- Local authority: Oxfordshire
- Department for Education URN: 142104 Tables
- Ofsted: Reports
- Chair of Governors: Jenny Crewe
- Headteacher: Anthony Broadley
- Gender: Coeducational
- Age: 11 to 18
- Enrolment: c.1300
- Houses: Kraken, Griffin, Dragon, Phoenix
- Website: http://www.maschool.org.uk

Matthew Arnold School is a coeducational secondary school and sixth form located just west of Oxford near Cumnor Hill and Botley and is named after 19th-century poet Matthew Arnold.

The school contains around 1,300 pupils from years 7 to 13, and circa 80 teaching staff. The school catchment area includes Oxford to the west of the railway station, Botley, Cumnor, Binsey, Wytham, and stretches west towards Appleton, Fyfield and Kingston Bagpuize.

Previously a community school founded in 1958 as Matthew Arnold Secondary Modern, it was administered by Oxfordshire County Council. The school was built for a total cost of £125,000 and was opened by Henry Brooke who was then Minister of Housing. In August 2015, following a community consultation, Matthew Arnold School converted to academy status and is now part of the Acer Trust. The school continues to coordinate with Oxfordshire County Council for admissions.
