= Hamble School =

The Hamble School

Location
- Satchell Lane; Hamble, Hampshire, SO31 4NE; England; 50°52′23″N 1°19′36″W

Information
- Type: Community school
- Motto: Achieving Excellence Together
- Established: 1937
- Local authority: Hampshire
- Department for Education URN: 116413 Tables
- Ofsted: Reports
- Chair of Governors: Hannah Craggs
- Headteacher: Louisa Cambridge
- Staff: 128
- Gender: Mixed
- Age: 11 to 16
- Enrolment: 1162
- Houses: Lords; Wembley; Twickenham; Wimbledon
- Website: http://www.thehambleschool.co.uk/

The Hamble School is a secondary school in Hamble-le-Rice, offering education to children between 11-16.

== History ==
The school was founded in 1937, originary to be named 'Butlocks Heath Senior School'. However, before opening the name was changed to 'Hamble Senior School'. The school was opened to increase school places in the area, which was needed due to the significant growth in the local aviation industry. The school continued to grow with the local area.

In 2002, the Hamble Community Sports Complex opened, allowing the school to gain its Sports College status. To reflect this, the name was changed to 'Hamble Community Sports College'. This status was lost in 2011, with the ending of the government programme.

In 2016, the school changed its name to 'The Hamble School'.

== Ofsted ==
The school's most recent inspection was on 14 September 2022. The school was rated as 'Requires Improvement'. This is a fall from the previous inspection in 2017, in which the school was rated 'Good'. As a result, a new Headteacher had been brought in.

== Notable alumni ==
- Danny Ings - footballer, West Ham United
- Dani King - cyclist (Women's Team Pursuit World Champion 2011, 2012 and 2013; Women's Team Pursuit Gold Medallist at London 2012)
