= King's Academy Brune Park =

Location
- Military Road; Gosport, Hampshire, PO12 3BU; England; 50°48′37″N 1°09′27″W

Information
- Type: Academy
- Motto: Toujours Prêt (Always ready)
- Established: 1965
- Local authority: Hampshire
- Trust: King's Group Academies
- Department for Education URN: 144014 Tables
- Ofsted: Reports
- Headteacher: Kerry Payne
- Gender: Coeducational
- Age: 11 to 16
- Enrolment: 1,755
- Houses: Brockhurst, Wallington, Monkton, Gilkicker
- Website: kgabrunepark.uk

King's Academy Brune Park, formerly Brune Park Community School, is a coeducational secondary school on Military Road, Gosport, Hampshire, England.

== History ==
The name comes from the Prideaux-Brune family, who donated the land on which the school is built to the local education authority for the purpose of establishing a school. The school's crest is based on the Prideaux-Brune coat of arms. The motto is toujours prêt (always ready).

The school was opened at its current location in 1965, amalgamating the existing Central School with the Grove Boys' and Girls' Secondary Modern Schools.

Its sixth form was removed in 1987, and replaced by the nearby sixth form colleges St Vincent College and Fareham College.

The Office for Standards in Education, Children's Services and Skills (Ofsted) rated the school as 'inadequate' in June 2016. Following this report, Ofsted placed the school in special measures, In 2017, the school was converted to an academy under the Gosport and Fareham Multi-Academy Trust.

In November 2023, it was announced on the Brune Park website that the Gosport and Fareham Multi-Academy Trust (GFM) was joining the King's Group academies. This included all other schools previously within the GFM, including schools such as Bay House School.

The school's name, uniform, and logo were changed to King's Academy Brune Park in May 2024.
