= The Ridings School =

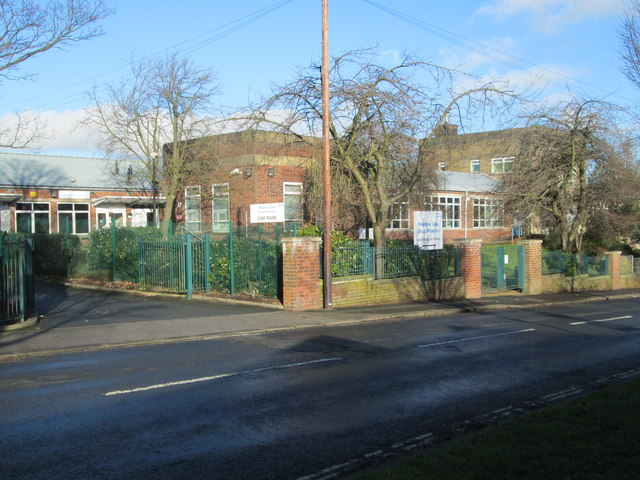
- Former school buildings used as a medical group practice (2014)

Location
- Nursery Lane; Ovenden; Halifax, West Yorkshire, HX3 5SX; England; 53.74039°N 1.88615°W

Information
- Closed: 15 July 2009
- Local authority: Calderdale
- Head teacher: Peter Clark (1996–1997); Anna White (1996–2005); Stuart Todd (2005–2009)
- Age: 11 to 18 (16 After the sixth form centre closed in 2007)
- Houses: Blue, Yellow, Red, Green
- Colours: House coloured shirt, navy jumper (up to 2005); White shirt, navy blue jumper (up to 2009)

The Ridings was a secondary school for ages 11–18 in Ovenden, Halifax, West Yorkshire, England, overseen by the Calderdale local authority. It was created in 1995 when two local secondary modern schools merged. The school was relatively small for its type; as of 2007 it had 537 students, of whom 28 were in the sixth form. Before it became the Ridings school, it was known as The Ovenden High School (which closed on 31 December 1994).

The headteacher, Anna White was rewarded with a CBE in 1999 for improving the school after it had been labelled "Britain's worst school". White then left the role of Headteacher in 2004 which then passed onto Stuart Todd who also had a reputation for improving schools. Along with a new management team, Todd then led the school to record grades.

In 1996 the school received nationwide attention when staff said 60 of its pupils were "unteachable" and school operations were temporarily suspended while the headmaster and other leading staff were replaced. The school subsequently enjoyed greatly improved GCSE examination results; however, its 2005 Ofsted report regarded it as "inadequate" (one grade above "failing") overall, although "well placed to move forward". In the subsequent Ofsted inspection in 2008 however, after being placed in special measures, the school was rated "good".

On 29 October 2007, Calderdale Council announced that the school would be closed down. In the 2008 GCSE results, the school received record grades and record number of students who received five or more GCSEs at grade C or above. In the final year of the Ridings, this was bettered again and the Final prom was held. The final prom for the Ridings School was held at Berties Elland. Headmaster of the school up to the time of closing down was Stuart Todd, along with the deputies Stewart Edgell and Victoria Callaghan.

The school closed on 15 July 2009 and there was speculation that the building would be demolished. However the building has been saved for community use. The top section of the school where the staff room and reception were has been converted into a doctors surgery, and the sports centre is now used for sporting clubs and gym membership. In June 2013 the whole site was leased to the not-for-profit organisation, Threeways, who plan to convert the building into a community hub with fitness, sport and entertainment facilities. Threeways adopted the sports centre and in the first three months since opening have seen a considerable uptake in the use of the centre and involvement of local residents both as volunteers and service users.
