= The Hurst School =

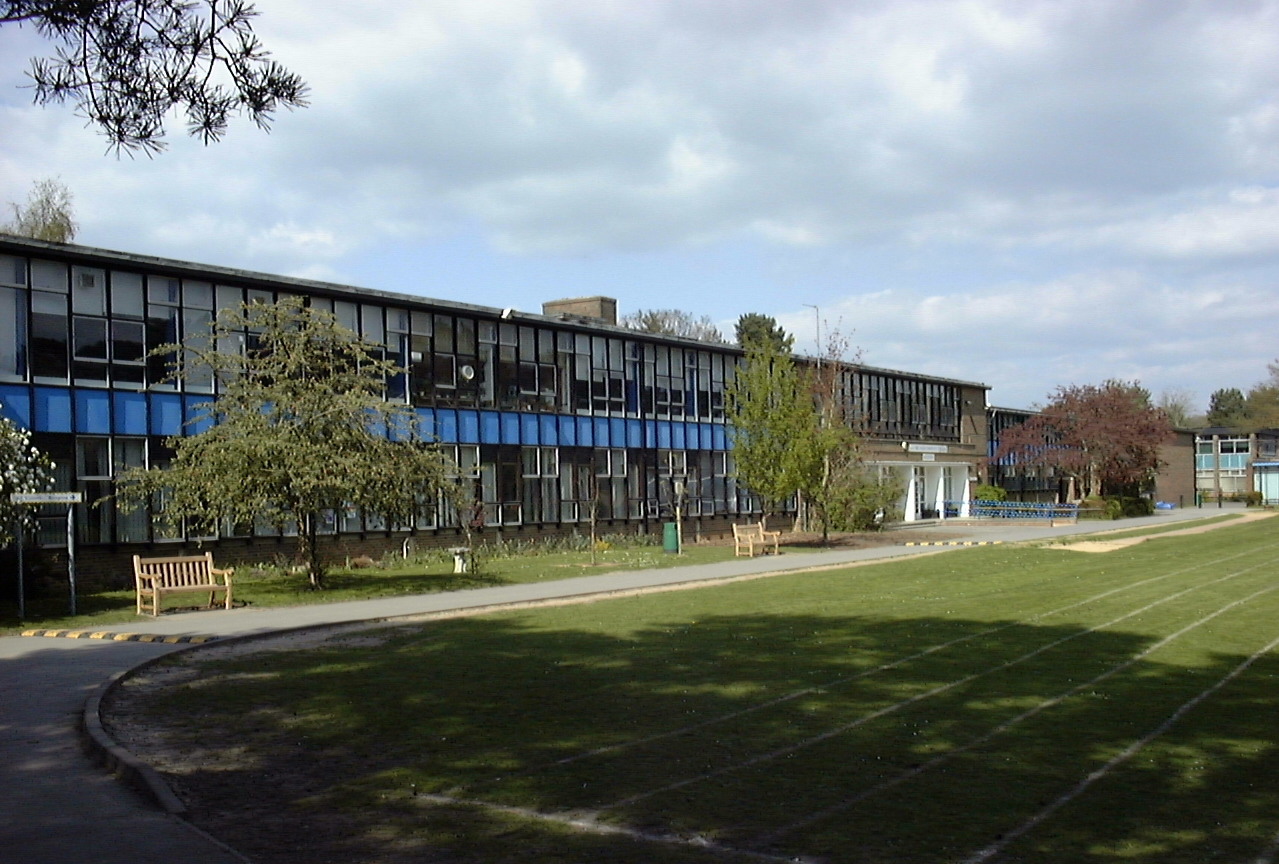

Location
- Brimpton Road, Baughurst; Tadley, Hampshire, RG26 5NL; England
- Coordinates: 51.3578°N 1.1742°W

Information
- Type: Community School
- Motto: Ambition Commitment Excellence Respect Community
- Established: 1957
- Local authority: Hampshire
- Department for Education URN: 116422 Tables
- Ofsted: Reports
- Head teacher: Jayne McLaren
- Gender: Co-educational
- Age: 11 to 16
- Enrollment: 1014 (2025)
- Capacity: 1080
- Website: www.thehurst.school

The Hurst School, previously The Hurst Community College, is a state secondary school in the village of Baughurst, in the county of Hampshire in England. Jayne McLaren is the headteacher. The school has just over 1,000 students.

The school provides secondary education for boys and girls aged from 11 to 16. It is a community school and is run wholly by the local education authority (LEA).

Pupils come from a catchment area which includes the nearby town of Tadley and the villages of Silchester, Bramley, Sherborne St John and Pamber Heath. The school was opened in 1957, under the name Hurst County Secondary Modern School.

== Curriculum ==
The school teaches a variety of subjects which are examined at GCSE level or through BTEC awards. Pupils follow the National Curriculum.

== Performance ==
As of 2025, the school's most recent inspection by Ofsted was in October 2024. This was a short inspection where the school was judged to be 'Good'. The full inspection in May 2015 judged the school as 'Good'.

== Notable former pupils ==
- James Bye, actor
