= Stantonbury School =

Secondary school in Milton Keynes, England

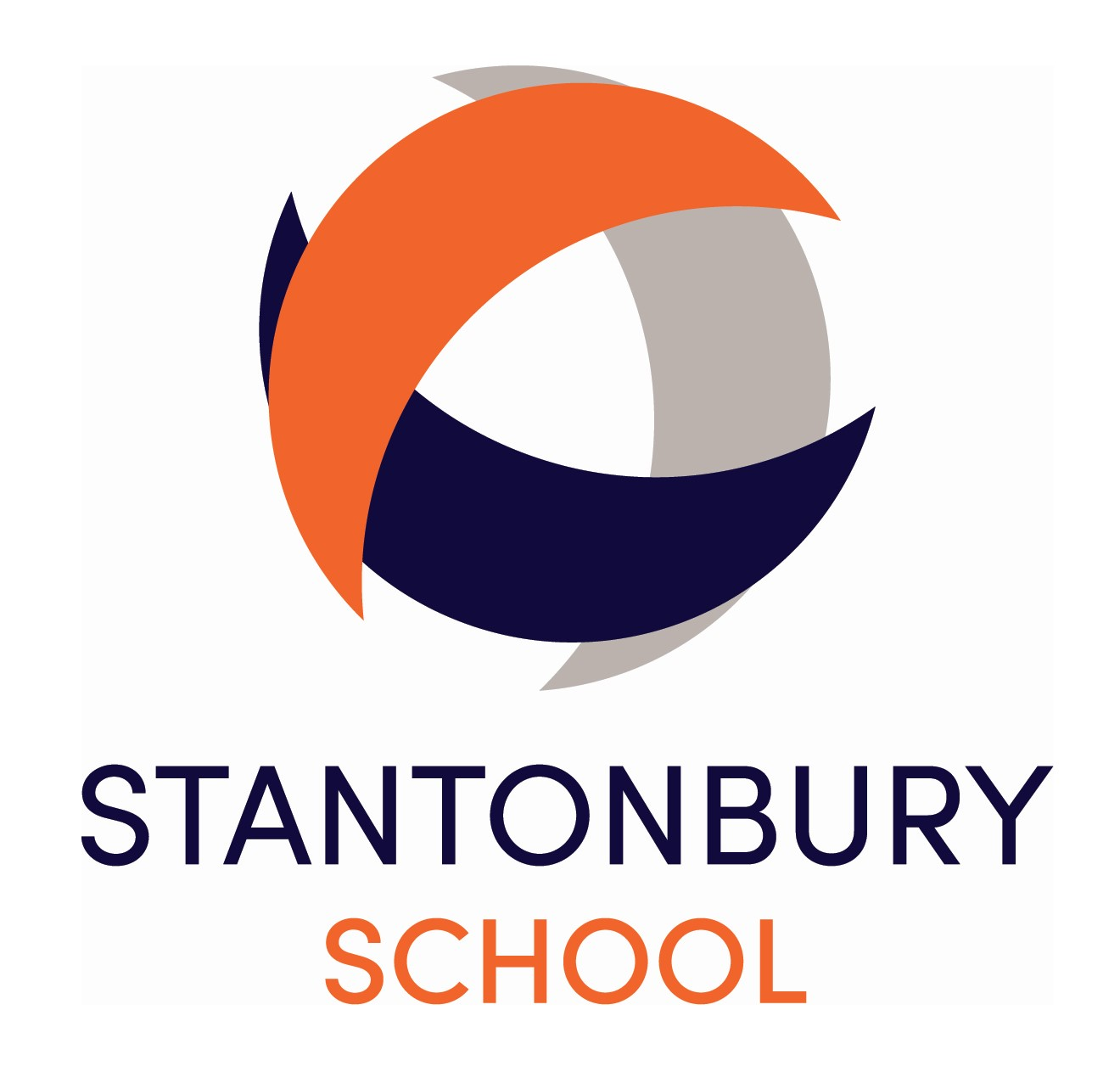

Location
- Purbeck; Milton Keynes, Buckinghamshire, MK14 6BN; England; 52.061°N 0.7727°W

Information
- Type: Comprehensive; Academy
- Established: 1974; 52 years ago
- Founder: Geoff Cooksey
- Local authority: Milton Keynes Council
- Trust: Tove Learning Trust
- Department for Education URN: 148835 Tables
- Ofsted: Reports
- Staff: 341 (2017)
- Gender: Coeducational
- Age: 11 to 19
- Enrolment: 1626
- Capacity: 2669
- Houses: Cooksey (post-16); Dansteed; Grafton; Portway; Saxon
- Website: stantonbury-tove.org.uk

Stantonbury School (formerly known as Stantonbury Campus and Stantonbury International School) is a coeducational secondary school in north Milton Keynes, England, established in 1974. It is the second-largest secondary comprehensive school in the United Kingdom with more than 1,600 school students aged 11–18 (Years 7-13 / US Grades 6-12), as of January 2020. It is part of a community site, with shared facilities including a leisure centre, a theatre, a health centre and a church.

Originally established as two schools (Bridgewater Hall and Brindley Hall), in the late 1980s it was restructured into four halls plus a shared sixth form, and eventually merged into one school. The campus held Arts College status as its specialism under the now discontinued specialist schools programme.

== History ==
Original Stantonbury Campus logo

The Campus logo from 2012 to 2018.

School logo from 2018 to 2021.

The concept for the school developed in the early 1970s with Geoff Cooksey appointed by Buckinghamshire County Council in 1971, where he worked with Tim Brighouse to create the first new secondary school in Milton Keynes since its designation.

Stantonbury Campus was the first secondary school in the country to not require a uniform, but 38 years later the school introduced a uniform for years 7-9 for the September 2012 term following pressure from governors, from Ofsted and growing discipline issues.

The school has a history of educational innovation and has defended the principles of comprehensive education in a climate which has sometimes been hostile to its inclusive and learner-centred ethos.

The original Stantonbury timetable was significantly different to other secondary schools, incorporating long 1 1/4 hr and 2 1/2 hr sessions, and during the 1970s and 1980s, suspending normal timetables every fortnight (later every month) for "Day 10", a day of extra curricular activity which was selected by the student. At the end of each school year, the timetable was suspended for a week for "Week 10".

Stantonbury School is one of the largest comprehensive schools in the country by pupil numbers (Nottingham Academy is the largest since 2009). Having been a 12-to-18 school from its inception, it admitted students in Year 7 from September 2006, following reorganisation of secondary education in Milton Keynes.

Previously a foundation school administered by Milton Keynes Borough Council, in September 2016 Stantonbury Campus was converted to academy status and was renamed Stantonbury International School. From then until the contract was terminated with effect from July 2021, the school was administered by the Griffin Schools Trust, which reduced its performance from satisfactory to inadequate. The school closed as Stantonbury International on 31 August 2021, and reopened on 1 September 2021 under the Tove Learning Trust as "Stantonbury School". All permanent staff were transitioned to the new employer.

== Sixth form ==
The sixth form is based in its own hall in the centre of the campus.

== Achievement and standards ==
A 2018 OFSTED report praised the school's performing arts and physical education programs, and the school has had "specialist" status in the arts since 1998. The school's community theatre is used by a range of national, international and local theatre companies, in conjunction with the school's annual student production and dance/drama performances throughout the year. Students at Stantonbury School participate in regional and national sporting competitions. Beyond sports and arts, students have access to a range of traditional academic subjects and are encouraged to excel not only within the classroom but beyond, as part of a holistic approach to education with an emphasis on educating the whole child.

=== Ofsted termination of Griffin Trust ===
In its December 2018 report, OFSTED rated the school as "Requires improvement". In January 2020, another Ofsted Report rated the quality of education, behavior and attitudes, and leadership and management "inadequate" and placed the school in Special Measures, citing intimidation of pupils and staff, dangerous behaviour, staff overwhelmed and unsupported amongst other issues.

Almost a year after OFSTED's 'special measures' rating, the Department for Education announced that it would (in effect) terminate the Griffin Trust's management of the school with effect from July 2021, saying that the school "would improve more quickly with a stronger trust". Members of Milton Keynes Council argued for the school to be returned to Local Authority control rather than to another multi-school Academy Trust company, pointing out that the school's enrolment has fallen by over 25% since its control by the Griffin Trust. Despite this, the school was taken over by Multi-Academy Trust, Tove Learning Trust in September 2021.

== The Arts ==
Stantonbury Campus has been a specialist Arts College since 1998 and holds the Artsmark Gold mark from the Arts Council of England.
