= Crickhowell High School =

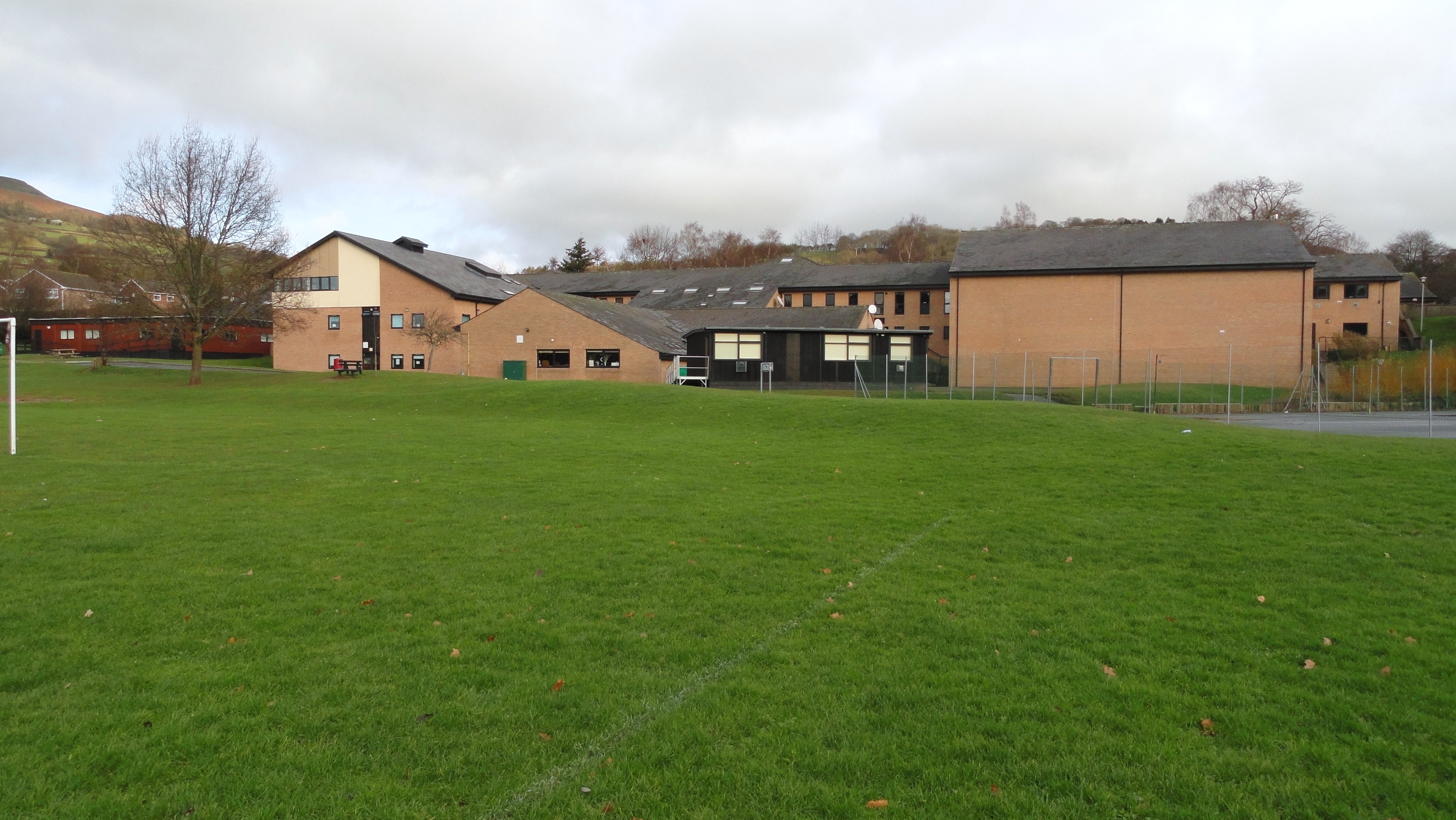

Location
- New Road; Crickhowell, Powys, NP8 1AW; Wales; 51.8610°N 3.1408°W

Information
- Type: Comprehensive School
- Motto: Excellence Through Endeavour
- Established: 1983
- Local authority: Powys
- Head teacher: Marc Yeoman
- Gender: Mixed
- Age: 11 to 18
- Enrolment: 920+
- Language: English
- Houses: 5
- Colours: Black and red
- Website: www.crickhowell-hs.powys.sch.uk

Crickhowell High School is an English medium co-educational secondary school situated in the town of Crickhowell in the county of Powys, Wales, within the Brecon Beacons National Park.

The school was built to meet the needs of the growing community and opened as a new school in 1983. It now has about 920 pupils, but was only originally intended to hold 550. The school attempted to meet the potential overcrowding issues by expanding the main building, installing new IT devices throughout the complex, and building a larger, more modern "6th Form block" for the 180 students studying A/AS levels.

== Exam results ==
In 2005 at GCSE, the percentage of pupils gaining at least five grades A*-C including Mathematics and English had risen from 59% to 79% since the last inspection, compared to a rise of three percentage points nationally. The figure was well above the latest national comparator of 52% and local average of 60%. In 2012 the school saw 93% of students achieve the Level 2 threshold of at least 5 x A-C, significantly up from last year and from 2010; over 30% of all GCSE grades were at A*/A level. Boys have performed on a par with girls at GCSE which goes against the national trend.

At A-Level, in 2005, the percentage of students gaining at least two grades A-C reached 93%, compared to 68% nationally. In 2012 53% of all A Level grades reached A* or A grade.

== Notable alumni ==
- Mark Wallace: Wicketkeeper-batsman for Glamorgan County Cricket Club
