= Woldgate School and Sixth Form College =

Location
- 92 Kilnwick Road; Pocklington, East Riding of Yorkshire, YO42 2LL; England; 53.931720°N 0.765670°W

Information
- Type: Academy
- Motto: Of great merit, character & value
- Established: September 1958
- Local authority: East Riding
- Trust: Wonder Learning Partnership
- Department for Education URN: 143588 Tables
- Ofsted: Reports
- Headteacher: Jonathan Britton (interim)
- Staff: ~100
- Gender: Coeducational
- Age: 11 to 18
- Enrolment: 1,267
- Houses: Thixendale, Millington Dale, Great Givendale, Warrendale, Kirby Underdale
- Website: https://woldgate.co.uk/index.html

Woldgate School and Sixth Form College, more commonly known as Woldgate School, and formerly Woldgate College, is a coeducational secondary school and sixth form on Kilnwick Road in Pocklington, East Riding of Yorkshire, England. It educates approximately 1,200 pupils aged 11 to 18. Until 2017, the school was Local Authority funded, but became an academy in January 2017 and is now part of the Wonder Learning Partnership multi-academy trust. The school received positive report in its latest Ofsted inspection, and was considered a 'good' school until Ofsted ended the use of one-word ratings.

Woldgate School educates pupils from Pocklington and its surrounding villages, which forms a large, mainly rural catchment area.

The school teaching is under the National Curriculum, and includes a Sixth Form.

In early September 2026, Mrs Lauren Adams resigned as headteacher after just nine months in the role. Therefore, trust CEO Mr Jonathan Britton is currently serving as interim headteacher. In addition, Trust Director Mr Gareth Davies is currently serving as interim deputy headteacher following the resignation of Mr Michael Monaghan.

== Facilities ==
Woldgate School was first built in the 1950s, and was expanded multiple times with new buildings being added between then and the 2000s.

In 2021, the school was selected by the Department for Education to be part of the School Rebuilding Programme. Wates Construction, a national construction company, was selected by the Department for Education to design and build the new school site.

The redevelopment plan sees most of the existing buildings demolished, with the exception of the existing music block which is being retained and incorporated into the new site. This music block was built in the 2000s using a grant which the school received after it was awarded specialist status; the building includes a recording studio, rehearsal rooms, classrooms and a dance studio.

Work on the site began in March 2023, with the demolition of the first existing block. Soon after, work on the brand-new Main Teaching Building began. In November 2025, the school moved into the new Main Building, which includes an auditorium, food court, library, laboratories, computer suites and classrooms.

The demolition of all other existing buildings is underway. The construction of the new Sports building has begun and is scheduled for completion in late 2026. The existing music block will also be receiving refurbishment work over the coming months.

The site’s redevelopment also includes an increase of coach and car parking and associated landscaping. The redevelopment was planned in such a way that is ensuring the continuity of facilities for the school during the build process, without the need for temporary accommodation.

The new school buildings are designed to be Net Zero Carbon in Operation and rely heavily on solar energy.

The project’s overall completion date is May 2027.

== Leadership ==
Woldgate School has had six headteachers since opening in 1958.

- HC Vaughan: 1958-1973
- John Brown: 1973-1997
- Jeff Bower: 1997-2015
- Jonathan Britton: 2015-2022, 2026-present
- Luke Sloman: 2022-2026
- Lauren Adams: January-September 2026

In September 2026, Lauren Adams resigned as headteacher after just nine months in the role. Therefore, trust CEO Jonathan Britton is currently serving as interim headteacher. In addition, Trust Director Gareth Davies is currently serving as interim deputy headteacher following the resignation of Michael Monaghan.

== Notable former pupils ==
- Findlay Brown, musician
- Nick Culkin, football player
- Robert E Fuller, wildlife artist
- Michael Woods, football player
