= Leeds City Academy =

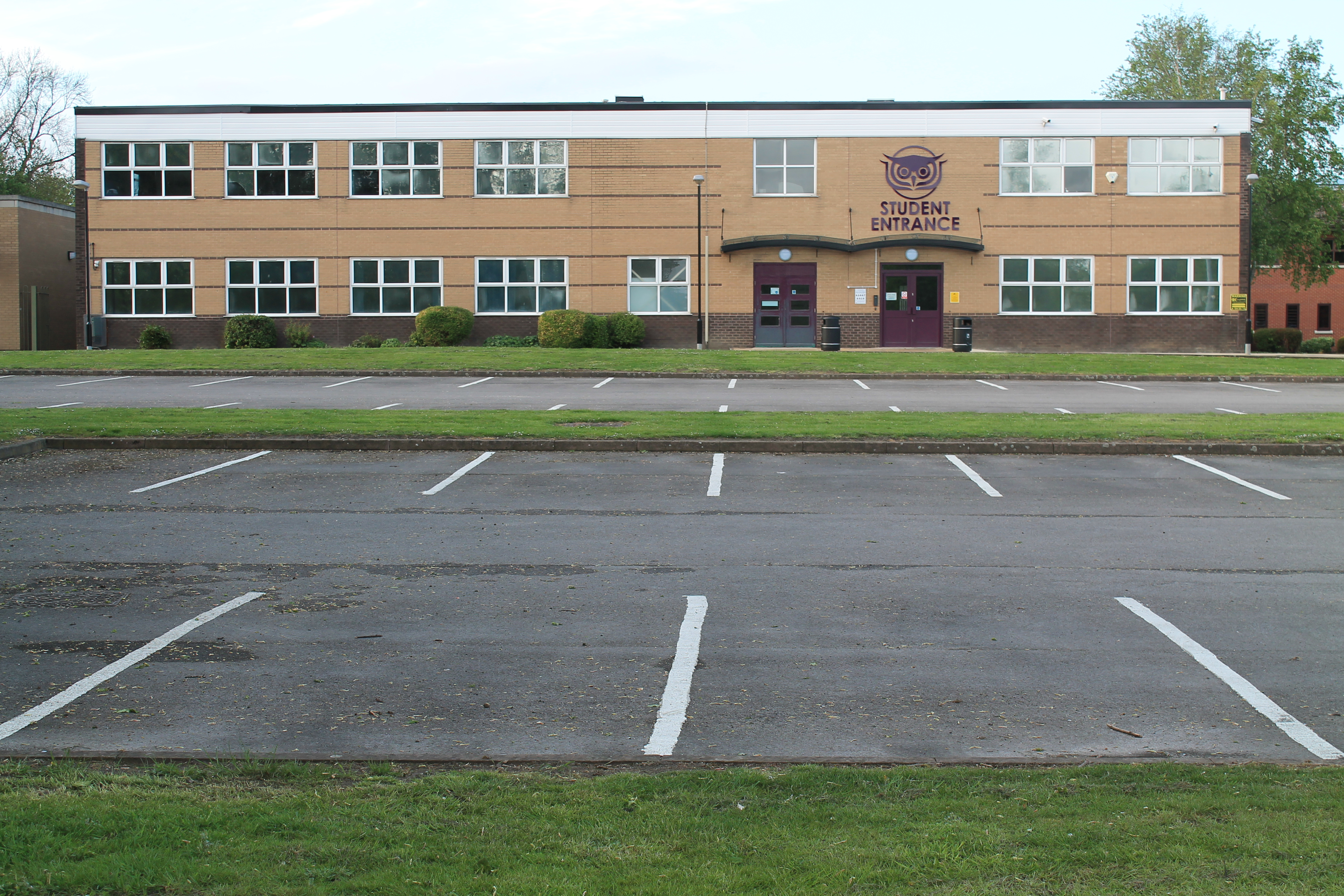

Location
- Bedford Field; Woodhouse Cliff, Leeds, West Yorkshire, LS6 2LG; England; 53.8176°N 1.5586°W

Information
- Type: Academy
- Established: 1900
- Department for Education URN: 139646 Tables
- Ofsted: Reports
- Principal: Richard Chattoe
- Gender: Mixed
- Age: 11 to 16
- Website: http://www.leedscityacademy.org/

Leeds City Academy (formerly City of Leeds School) is a mixed secondary school with academy status, located in Woodhouse, Leeds, West Yorkshire, England. The school building was opened to pupils in 1992, although the City of Leeds School has existed on a different site for over 100 years.

== Governance ==
Leeds City Academy was previously a community school administered by Leeds City Council known as City of Leeds School. City of Leeds School converted to academy status on 1 August 2014 and was renamed Leeds City Academy.

Leeds City Academy is part of a larger academy chain known as White Rose Academies which is sponsored by Leeds City College. Other Schools in the academy chain include Leeds West Academy (acting as lead school) and Leeds East Academy.

== Academic Performance ==
In the last full section 5 Ofsted inspection in April 2013 the school was rated as 'requires improvement'. In May 2017, the school received a 'requires improvement' OFSTED inspection but the report did indicate that the school is rapidly improving.

== Controversy ==
The school featured in the British national news in March 2014, when it was reported that all pupils, whether or not of English origin, would be taught English as a foreign language.
