= Ratton School =

Coordinates: 50.790414°N 0.262859°E

Location
- Park Avenue; Eastbourne, East Sussex; England

Information
- Type: Academy
- Motto: Achieving together
- Local authority: East Sussex County Council
- Specialist: Arts College
- Department for Education URN: 138474 Tables
- Ofsted: Reports
- Executive Headteacher: Gavin Peevers
- Gender: Coeducational
- Age: 11 to 16
- Enrolment: 1196
- Website: http://www.ratton.e-sussex.sch.uk/

Ratton School is a secondary school with academy status in Eastbourne, East Sussex, England.

Communities
Community Name	Colour	Named after
Lighthouse	Red	
Seven sisters	White	
Cuckmere	Blue	
Redout	Red	
Long man	Green	[

All of the communities are named after theatres in London.

== Notable former pupils ==
- Joe Townsend (born 1988), paratriathlete
