= Wildern School =

Location
- Wildern Lane; Hedge End, Hampshire, SO30 4EJ; England; 50.920°N 1.302°W

Information
- Type: Academy
- Motto: Care, Opportunity, Quality
- Established: 1933
- Local authority: Hampshire County Council
- Trust: Wildern Academy Trust
- Department for Education URN: 136654 Tables
- Ofsted: Reports
- Head teacher: Ceri Oakley
- Executive headteacher: Steve Mann
- Gender: Mixed
- Age range: 11–16
- Enrolment: 2,072 (2023)
- Capacity: 2,200
- Houses: Alba; Bedford; Driscoll; Jubilee; Paxton; Sovereign
- Colours: Strawberry red and dark green
- Accreditation: Artsmark Platinum
- Website: www.wildern.org

Wildern School is an 11–16 mixed secondary school with academy status in Hedge End, Hampshire, England. It was formerly a foundation school that was established in 1933 and became an academy in 2011.

== History ==
Wildern School was a foundation school that was established in 1933 and became an academy in 2011. It became a multi-academy trust in 2018.

In 2016, the school made national news when police were called because a student had viewed the UK Independence Party website and an English Defence League video. The school said it had called 101 for advice, acting in line with extremism guidelines, and was referred to a specialist team who made the decision to arrange a meeting with the student and their parent. No further action was taken.

== School performance ==
In 2012, the school was inspected by Ofsted, with a judgement of 'Outstanding'.

As of 2022, the school's most recent Ofsted inspection was in 2022. The report gave the school a judgement of 'Requires improvement'. It was noted that some pupils felt unsafe at school because of the behaviour of other pupils, including bullying behaviour. The report said pupils raised concerns about "discriminatory language becoming normalised among groups of their peers".

In a 2012 report, the school was identified by Ofsted as an example of good practice in the way it teaches modern languages.

The school's Progress 8 benchmark at GCSE in 2019 was above average. The percentage of students at the school entered for the English Baccalaureate was lower than average. The percentage of children achieving Grade 5 or above in English and maths GCSEs was above average.
