= The Purbeck School =

Location
- Worgret Road; Wareham, Dorset, BH20 4PF; England; 50.68269°N 2.12316°W

Information
- Type: Academy
- Established: 1974
- Local authority: Dorset Council
- Trust: The Wessex Multi-Academy Trust
- Department for Education URN: 148737 Tables
- Ofsted: Reports
- Head teacher: Adam Darley
- Gender: coeducational
- Age: 11 to 18
- Enrolment: 992
- Website: http://www.purbeck.dorset.sch.uk

The Purbeck School is a coeducational secondary school and sixth form located in Wareham in the central southern area of Dorset, England, on the Isle of Purbeck.

The organisation of schools in the Purbeck area is based on a comprehensive two-tier system. Children transfer at the age of 11 from eleven Primary Schools (ages 5 to 11) and most of them will then come to The Purbeck School (11 to 16). The school also operates a sixth form which has students ages 16 to 18.

Previously a community school administered by Dorset Council, in May 2022 The Purbeck School converted to academy status. The school is now sponsored by The Wessex Multi-Academy Trust.
