= Driffield School =

Driffield School & Sixth Form

Location
- Manorfield Road; Driffield, East Riding of Yorkshire, YO25 5HR; England; 54°00′31″N 00°25′39″W

Information
- Type: Academy
- Established: 1964
- Trust: The Education Alliance UID:3511
- Department for Education URN: 143854 Tables
- Ofsted: Reports
- CEO: Jonny Uttley
- Executive Principal: Scott Ratheram
- Age: 11 to 18 Houses: Brontë, Mortimer, Johnson and Holtby Former houses: Wilberforce, Fawcett
- Enrolment: 1349 as of March 2020
- Capacity: 1992
- Website: www.driffieldschool.net

Driffield School & Sixth Form is a coeducational comprehensive school which is situated on Manorfield Road in Driffield, in the East Riding of Yorkshire, England. The school has nearly 1400 pupils aged 11–18, who come from rural communities in the Yorkshire Wolds.

== History ==
In the 2011 Ofsted inspection Driffield School & Sixth Form was classed as grade 2, 'good'. Overall effectiveness of post 16 provision was classified as grade 3, 'satisfactory'.

In 2016 Headteacher Simon Jones resigned following a visit from Ofsted, after which the school was placed in 'Special Measures'. The Governing Body of the school then sought support from multi-academy trust The Education Alliance. It converted to an academy on 1 February 2017. Following a rapid period of improvement, Driffield School and Sixth Form was judged as a 'Good' school in all areas under the new Ofsted inspection framework in January 2020.

== Description ==
Driffield School & Sixth Form is an 11–19 comprehensive school with approximately 1,800 students on roll. It is part of The Education Alliance, a growing multi-academy trust, currently consisting of this school, South Hunsley School and Sixth Form College, Malet Lambert School, The Snaith School, Hunsley Primary School, North Cave Church of England Primary School and Yorkshire Wolds Teacher Training.

Before converting it had had a series of deteriorating Ofsted assessments. There have been leadership changes and Ofsted has reported that it is a happy school where students feel safe.

The school has a purpose-built Art and Technology building and a Performing Arts block. The school's North building has had a £1.2 million refurbishment that also led to energy efficiencies. The school accesses the adjacent East Riding Leisure Centre, and the school's facilities are also used by the local community outside school hours.

== Academics ==
The five year curriculum is taught in two key stages: Key Stage 3 in Years 7, 8 and 9 and Key Stage 4 in Years 10 and 11). Students study the core subjects, English, maths and science, alongside a wide range of non-core subjects. All students at Key Stage 3 study an hour of Achieving Personal Excellence (APEX) per week; these lessons focus on aspects of personal, social, health and economic education. They must also do two hours of PE.

In year 9 students proceed to the extended Key Stage 4. They continue to study the core subjects and do three targeted options. All students sit GCSEs at end of year 11. Somestudents are guided into a Vocational pathway where one of their three options will be a BTEC Level 2 in Digital Information Technology, Engineering, Enterprise and Marketing, Health and Social Care or Sports Studies.

The sixth form have separate facilities and a separate dining hall.

== Notable alumni ==
- Charlotte Fry, Olympic medal winning dressage athlete
- Lee Morris, footballer
- Curtis Woodhouse, footballer and boxer
- Mick Woodmansey, drummer
