= Ralph Thoresby School =

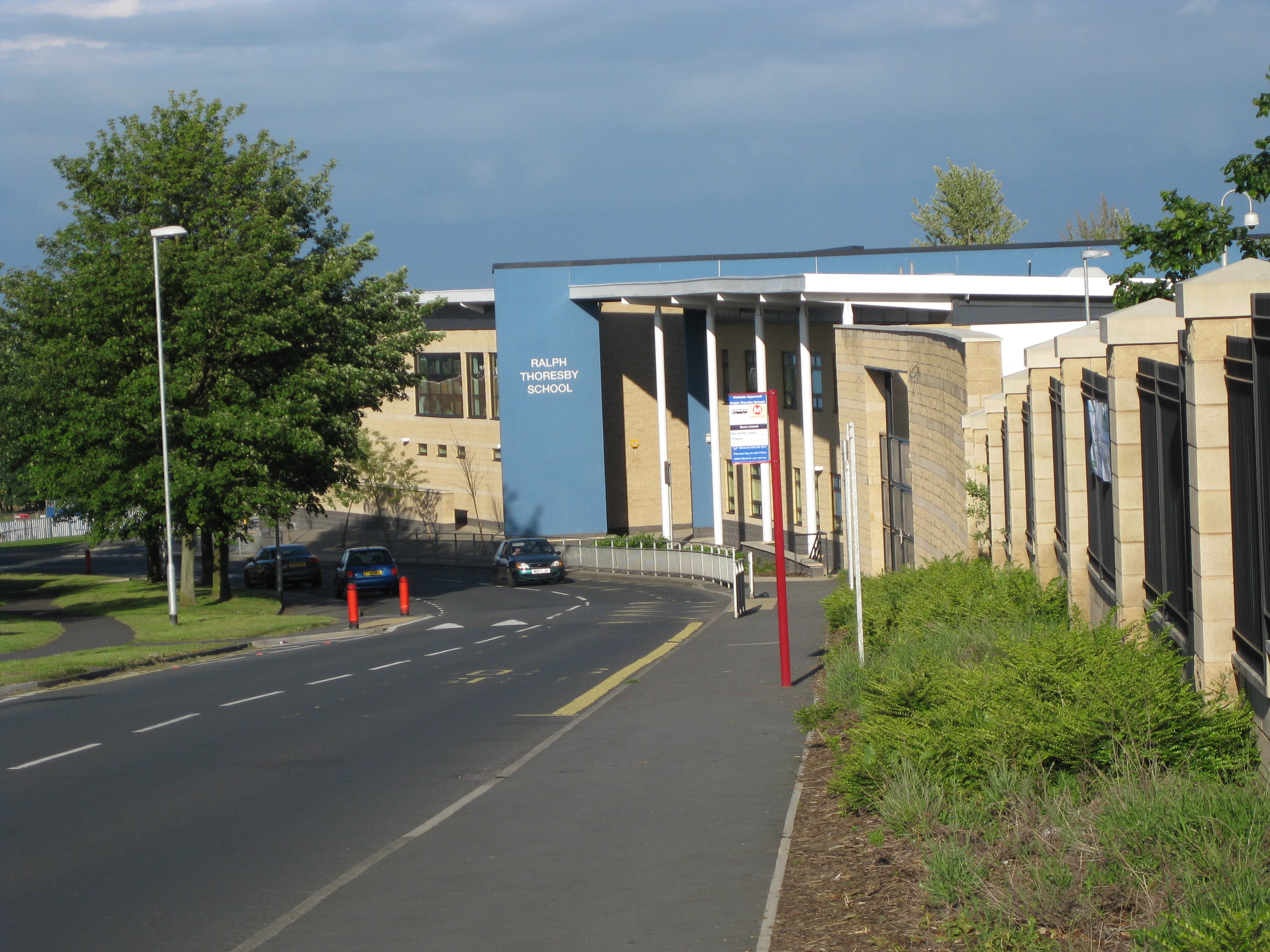

Location
- Holtdale Approach; Holt Park; Leeds, West Yorkshire, LS16 7RX; England; 53.85559°N 1.60739°W

Information
- Type: Foundation school
- Motto: "Ambition and Achievement For All"
- Local authority: Leeds City Council
- Trust: Leeds North West Education Partnership Foundation
- Department for Education URN: 108075 Tables
- Ofsted: Reports
- Headteacher: Will Carr
- Gender: Co-educational
- Age: 11 to 18
- Enrolment: 998
- Capacity: 1049
- Website: http://www.ralphthoresby.com/index.php

Ralph Thoresby School is a foundation secondary school and sixth form located in Holt Park, Leeds, West Yorkshire, England. Named after the antiquarian Ralph Thoresby, the comprehensive school accommodates about 1000 pupils aged between 11 and 18. Ralph Thoresby School is part of the North West Leeds Education Partnership Trust with local Primary Schools. At 6th Form Level the school is part of a partnership arrangement with Lawnswood School. The school provides for pupils with severe physical and visual impairment.

== History ==
The original Ralph Thoresby High School was built on Farrar Lane in 1973 and opened for pupils in 1974, as part of the overall development of Holt Park. The school was situated alongside, and saw use of the facilities of Holt Park Leisure Centre; contained a public library, and a large (228 seat) raked auditorium “community” theatre. It was notably lacking a school hall. The shared spaces, such as the theatre, were counted against the notional teaching space surface area meaning that the school rapidly ran out of actual classroom space. Holt Park Middle School sat adjacent, until being absorbed into Ralph Thoresby High School upon its closure on 31/08/1992.

The first Head Teacher was Dawn Lynes with Derek Webber as her Deputy.

The original school buildings were demolished in 2007 and replaced with the present day Ralph Thoresby School building which incorporates a community library and community theatre. It is adjacent to the Holt Park Active Centre which opened in 2013.

== Ofsted inspection ==
Ralph Thoresby School was inspected by Ofsted in March 2015. The inspectors rated the school Grade 2 (Good) in all areas and for overall effectiveness.

As of 2021, the school's most recent inspection was in 2018, with a judgement of Good.

== Academic performance ==
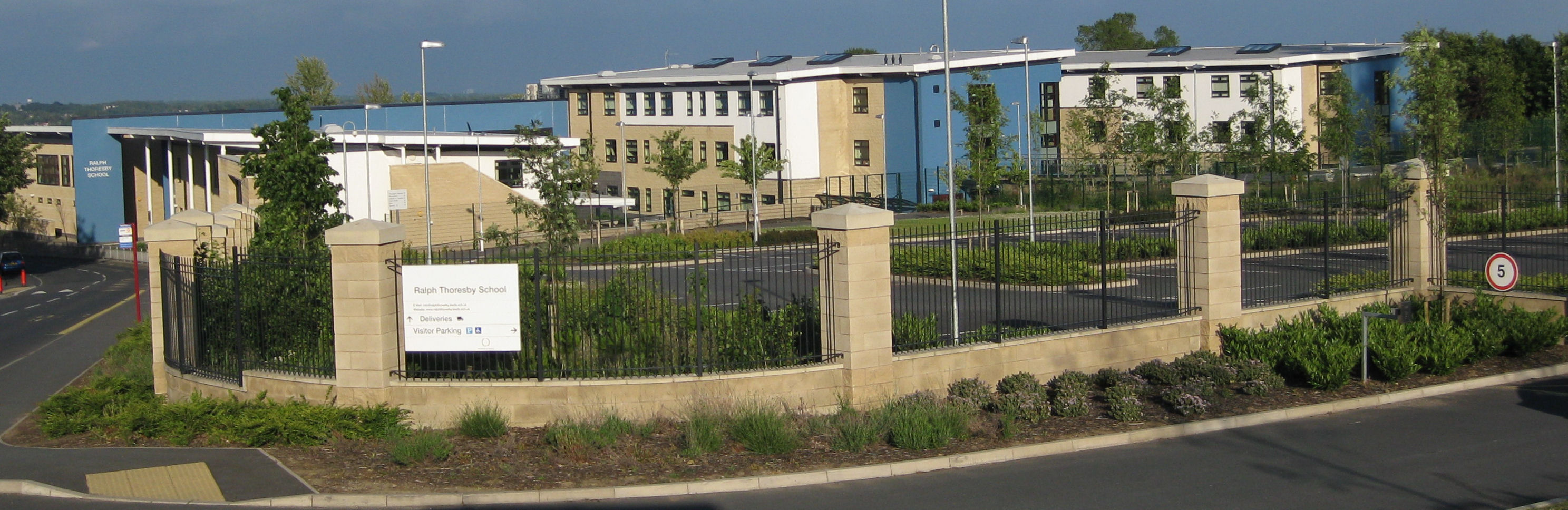
The School viewed from by the Tinshill BT Tower

Results at both Key Stage 4 and Key Stage 5 improved in 2013. At Key Stage 4, 52% of pupils achieved at least 5 grades A*-C including English and Maths (an increase of 5 percentage points since 2012); 87% of students achieved at least 5 A*-C grades in subjects (an increase of 20 percentage points since 2012). In A-level, 45% of pupils achieved A*-A grades and 98% of students achieved A-E grades.
