= Seahaven Academy =

Secondary school in Newhaven, East Sussex, England

Location
- Haven Way; Newhaven, East Sussex, BN9 9TD; England; 50°47′14″N 0°02′27″E

Information
- Type: Academy
- Motto: The best in everyone
- Local authority: East Sussex
- Department for Education URN: 140679 Tables
- Ofsted: Reports
- Staff: 100
- Gender: Mixed
- Age: 11 to 16
- Enrolment: 890
- Colours: Black and Orange
- Publication: 1
- Website: www.seahavenacademy.org.uk

Seahaven Academy (formerly Tideway Comprehensive School) is a secondary school in Newhaven, East Sussex. The school's academic achievements improved considerably when the school joined the United Learning Trust in 2014.

== Fire ==
On 5 April 2005, a large fire occurred at the school's central building. Many of its facilities, including the main hall, the library and 40 classrooms, were severely damaged. A 15-year-old boy was charged with arson, and burglary over the incident, but was later cleared of these charges.

The school site was redeveloped into a single complex following the fire. A time capsule was buried at the school in 2008 to commemorate its restoration.
