= Brynmawr Foundation School =

Coordinates: 51.805°N 3.167°W

Location
- Clydach Dingle; Brynmawr, Ebbw Vale, Blaenau Gwent, NP23 4XT; South Wales

Information
- Motto: Aspiration. Application. Achievement
- Established: nearly 60 years ago
- Local authority: Blaenau Gwent
- Headteacher: Susie Lake
- Gender: Coeducational
- Age: 11 to 16
- Colours: Navy, Red and Green
- Website: https://www.brynmawrfoundationschool.co.uk/

Brynmawr Foundation School (Welsh: Ysgol Sylfaenol Brynmawr) is a secondary school in Brynmawr, Blaenau Gwent, Wales.

== Academic performance ==
In 2016, 98% of pupils entered achieved at least 5 grades A* to C at GCSE level.

== Facilities ==
The sports ground features a 3G Sports pitch, opened in June 2022 by Elliot Dee. The funding for the project was provided by Sport Wales and Blaenau Gwent Council.
