= Howden School =

Location
- Derwent Road; Howden, East Riding of Yorkshire, DN14 7AL; England; 53.749100°N 0.860050°W

Information
- Type: Academy
- Motto: Diligence, Learning and Concord
- Established: 1963
- Trust: The Consortium Academy Trust
- Department for Education URN: 146129 Tables
- Ofsted: Reports
- Head teacher: L Tester
- Gender: Coeducational
- Age: 11 to 16
- Enrolment: 699
- Website: www.howdenschool.net

Howden School is a coeducational secondary school located in Howden in the East Riding of Yorkshire, England.

The school previously specialised in Technology and ICT. Pupils usually attend the school from Year Seven (aged 11 or 12) to Year Eleven (aged 16). The school sixth form department closed around 2010.

Howden School was placed in "Special Measures" following an Ofsted inspection in July 2010. The inspectors said the school was failing to give its pupils an acceptable standard of education, and that those responsible for leading and managing the school were not demonstrating the capacity to secure necessary improvement. The head teacher, Andrew Williams, left and was temporarily replaced by Gary Garghan (Acting Head) and Dave McCready (Executive Head). On 24 September 2011 Howden School was judged to be Grade 3 (satisfactory), by Ofsted and declared to be out of Special Measures. After Garghan left the school, Mr G. Cannon replaced him as headmaster. In the most recent Ofsted inspection the school was rated Good with elements of Outstanding.

Previously a community school administered by East Riding of Yorkshire Council, in September 2018 Howden School converted to academy status. The school is now sponsored by The Consortium Academy Trust.
