= Fort Hill Community School =

Fort Hill Community School & Centre

Location
- Kenilworth Road; Basingstoke, Hampshire, RG23 8JQ; England; 51.271463°N 1.122644°W

Information
- Established: 1977
- Closed: 2018
- Local authority: Hampshire County Council
- Department for Education URN: 116444 Tables
- Ofsted: Reports
- Gender: Coeducational
- Age: 11 to 16
- Website: http://www.forthillcommunityschool.org/

Fort Hill Community School was a coeducational secondary school located in Winklebury, Basingstoke, Hampshire, England.

== Location ==
The school was built within the ramparts of an Iron Age hill fort, Winklebury Ring. Around the school perimeter some of the old ditch site still remains. It is thought that the Celts once established a farming society around this fort.

The school was closed in 2018 and demolition of the site commenced in January 2019.
