= Priestlands School =

Location
- North Street; Pennington; Lymington, Hampshire, SO41 8FZ; England; 50.753°N 1.554°W

Information
- Type: Academy
- Established: 1957
- Local authority: Hampshire
- Department for Education URN: 137129 Tables
- Ofsted: Reports
- Chair of Governors: Kevin Harriman
- Headteacher: Peter Main
- Staff: 100
- Gender: Coeducational
- Age: 11 to 16
- Enrolment: 1,230
- Houses: Avon, Forest, Hurst and Solent
- Colour: Navy Blue
- Website: http://www.priestlands.hants.sch.uk/

Priestlands School is a Mixed-sex education secondary school located in Pennington, Hampshire in southern England. The school serves an area that includes the villages of Beaulieu, Brockenhurst, East Boldre, Hordle, Norleywood, Pilley, South Baddesley, Sway and the towns of Lymington and Milford-on-Sea.

== History ==
The oldest part of the school, built circa 1800, and the grounds were once the home of Rear-admiral John Peyton who commanded HMS Defence at the Battle of the Nile in 1798.

The school was founded in 1957.

Previously a community school and specialist arts college, in August 2011 the school converted to academy status. A 2008 Ofsted inspection assessed the school as Grade 1 (Outstanding). In 2012 it was judged Good. As of 2022, the school's most recent inspection was a short inspection in 2016 which found that the school remains Good.

== World record attempt ==
In 2012 the school attempted to set the world record for most people standing on one leg for two minutes with 892 people. However, a problem with the video resulted in insufficient evidence for the record to be officially recognised. This title is now held by Tesco.

== Walled Garden and environment ==
A student group called "The Eco-Warriors" restored an 18th-century walled garden in the grounds with pigs, bees, and chickens in 2008.

The school achieved Eco-Schools silver in 2012.

== Notable alumni ==
- Adamski, musician
- Birdy, musician
- Josh McQuoid, footballer
- Russell Perrett, footballer
- Joe Quigley, footballer
- Paul Rideout, footballer
- Jordan Rose, footballer
- Sam Vokes, footballer
- Belle Delphine Internet Personality
