= British big cats =

Reports of large non-native feline sightings in Britain

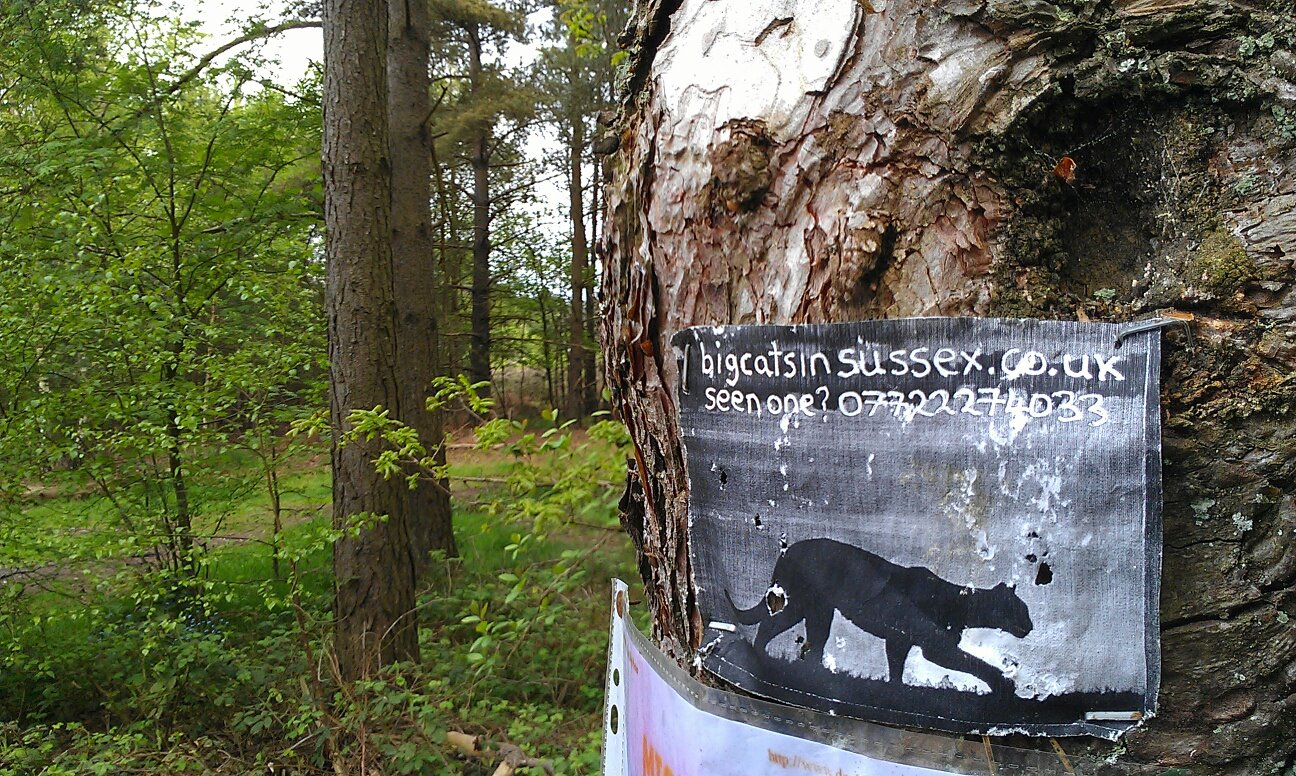
A sign requesting information on big cats in West Sussex.

In British folklore and urban legend, British big cats refers to the subject of reported sightings of non-native, wild big cats in the United Kingdom. Many of these creatures have been described as "panthers", "pumas", or "black cats".

There have been rare isolated incidents of recovered individual animals, often medium-sized species like the Eurasian lynx, although in one 1980 case, a puma was captured alive in Scotland. These are generally believed to have been escaped or released exotic pets that were held illegally, possibly released after the animals became too difficult to manage or after the introduction of the Dangerous Wild Animals Act 1976.

The existence of a population of "true big cats" in Britain, however, especially a breeding population, has been rejected by experts and the British government owing to a lack of convincing evidence for the presence of such animals. Supposed sightings made from a distance have been mostly written off as domestic cats close to the subject being misidentified as a larger animal sighted further away. One folklorist considered such sightings of creatures to be a "media artifact" driven by British journalistic practices in the 1970s and 1980s, while another described it as the result of a situation where "media-generated interest encourages rumour, misinterpretation, and exaggeration".

== Reported sightings and attacks ==
=== Folklore and historical stories ===
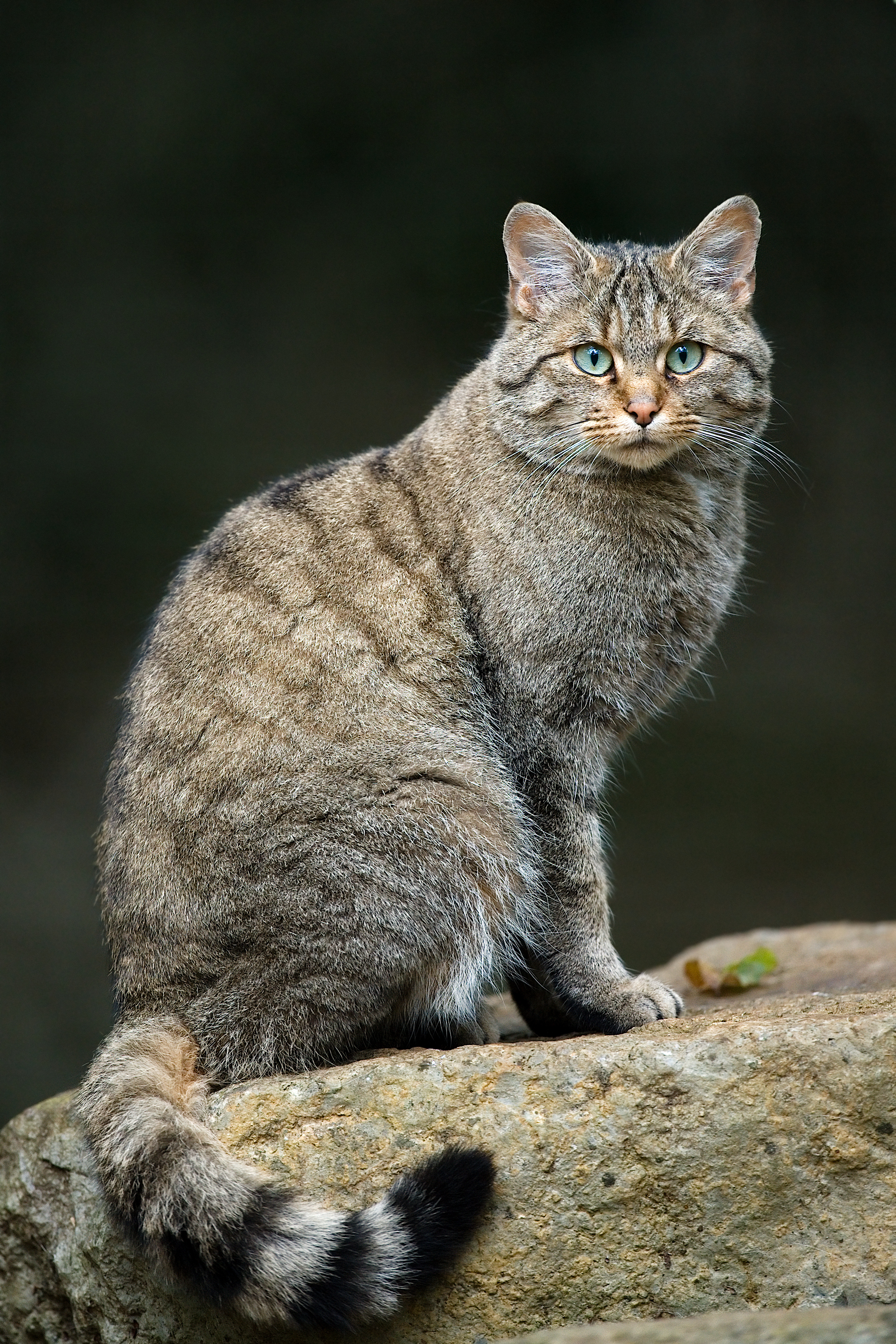
A European wildcat (Felis silvestris silvestris), the Scottish population of which is the only wild cat species known to live in Britain.

A medieval Welsh poem Pa Gwr in the Black Book of Carmarthen mentions a Cath Palug, meaning "Palug's cat" or "clawing cat", which roamed Anglesey until slain by Cei. In the Welsh Triads, it was the offspring of the monstrous sow Henwen.

The folktale of the Stratford Lyon tells of how, in the year 1400, John de Stratford pulled a giant, red, antlered lion from the ground at South Baddesley in the New Forest. The story is first recorded in the marginalia of an 18th-century bible. In the late 20th century, sightings of the lion were recorded in the vicinity of the Red Lion Pub, Boldre.

William Cobbett recalled in his Rural Rides how, as a boy in the 1760s, he had seen a cat "as big as a middle-sized Spaniel dog" climb into a hollow elm tree in the grounds of the ruined Waverley Abbey near Farnham in Surrey. Later, in New Brunswick, he saw a "lucifee" (Canada lynx) and noted that "it seemed to me to be just such a cat as I had seen at Waverley".

=== Contemporary claims ===
Since the early 2000s, there have been several individuals in different parts of the UK claiming to have suffered attacks by supposed big cats, though to date there is no substantive evidence proving these were in fact incidents caused by a non-domestic species of cat. Such claims include that of an eleven-year-old boy in Monmouthshire, a man in southeast London, a 74-year-old woman in the Scottish Highlands, and a man in Cornwall.

Phantom big cats have also formed the basis of several local urban legends within the United Kingdom where unexplained animal deaths, typically livestock, would be blamed on such alleged creatures, like the Beast of Bodmin Moor and the Cotswolds Big Cat. The physical "evidence" to support these claims has typically been determined to have prosaic origins. In the case of the Beast of Bodmin, when a skull found in the River Fowey was presented to the Natural History Museum as proof of its existence, it was determined to have been cut from a leopard skin rug, while in the case of the Cotswolds Big Cat, the only predator DNA that was found was that of foxes.

==== Beast of Exmoor ====
One particular instance of note of this phenomenon is the "Beast of Exmoor" (sometimes referred to as the "Exmoor Beast"). While stories about the Beast of Exmoor originally surfaced in a similar fashion to other local "big cat stories", with sightings of the creature reported as early as 1970, the story came to national prominence in the United Kingdom in 1983 when a South Molton farmer named Eric Ley claimed to have lost over 100 sheep in the space of three months, all of them apparently killed by violent throat injuries. The claim that these livestock had been killed by a mysterious beast led to "nationwide interest", with the Daily Express offering a substantial financial reward for video footage of the creature, while the government took the unusual step of deploying a team of Royal Marine snipers to hunt down (and presumably kill) the creature.

Despite extensive media coverage and both professional and amateur hunting for the creature, one such case involving a cryptozoologist who was rescued two days after having accidentally activated his trap, no large cat has ever been positively identified to explain such incidents as the 1983 livestock slayings, with them now being attributed to other causes like large dogs. Despite the lack of evidence, the Beast of Exmoor persists to some extent in the public imagination, and alleged sightings continue to be reported occasionally around Exmoor long after an escaped exotic pet (such as a leopard or puma) would have died, while one national newspaper reported the discovery of a carcass alleged to be the Beast of Exmoor that was later identified as a dead seal. Beyond these rumours regarding the creature itself, it has been posited by one journalist that the lasting legacy of the urban legend may be as a mythological base that real-life wildlife stories, such as the Emperor of Exmoor, can reference.

== Proven captures and remains ==
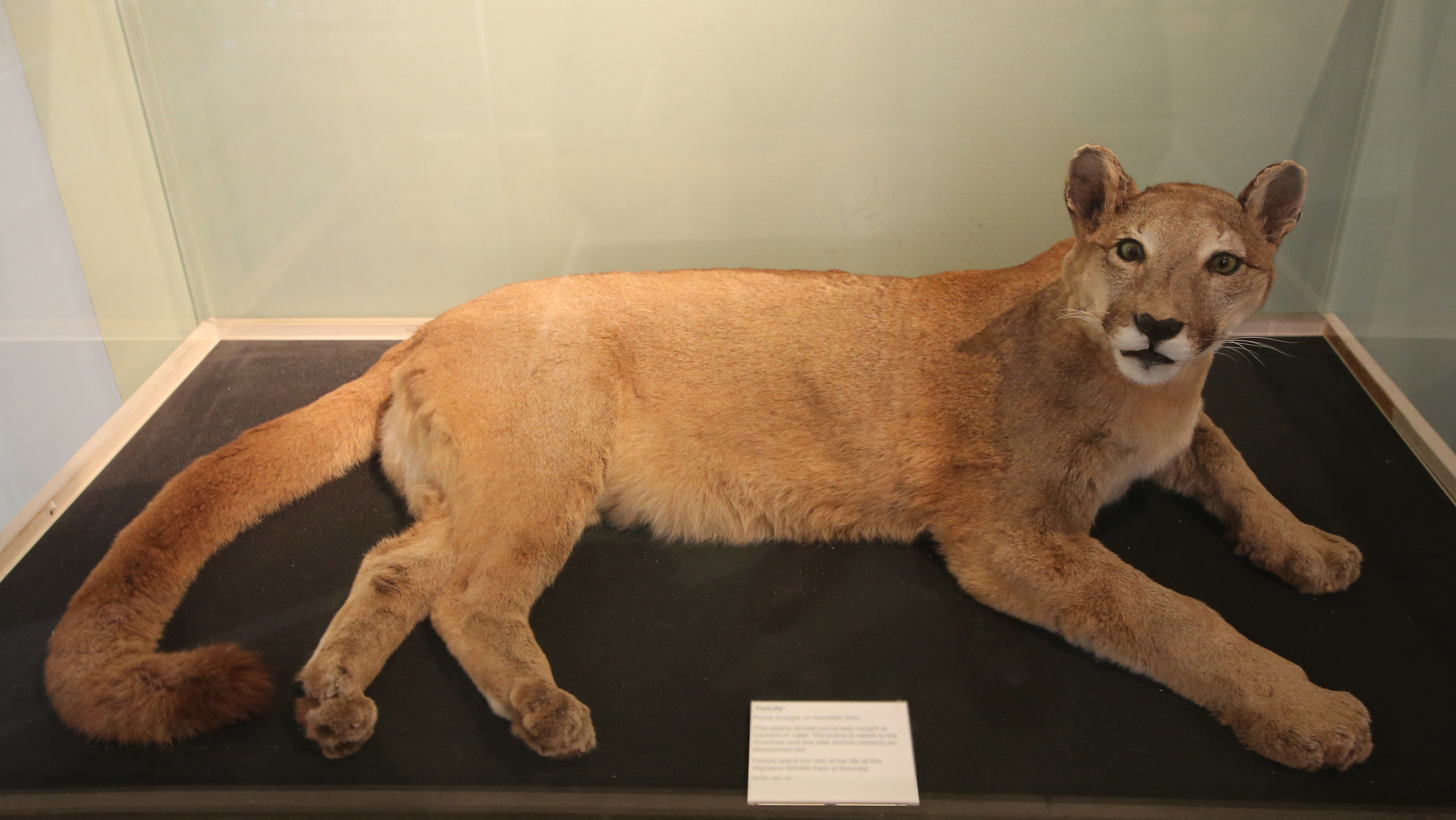
This puma (Puma concolor) was captured in the wild, in Inverness-shire, Scotland, in 1980. It is believed to have been an abandoned pet. It lived the rest of its life in a zoo. After it died, it was stuffed and placed in Inverness Museum.

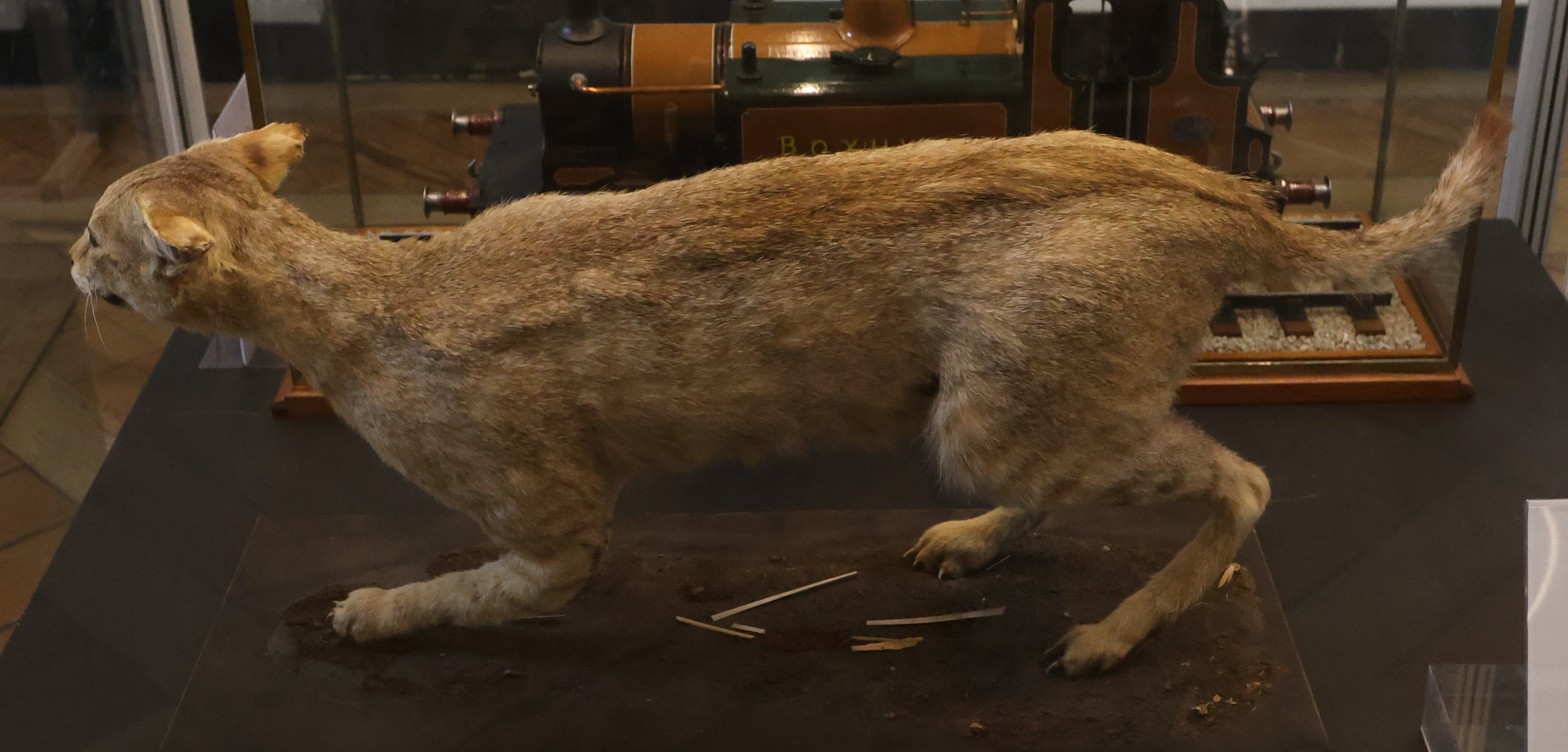
The taxidermied remains of a jungle cat (Felis chaus) killed by a car on Hayling Island

A Canadian lynx shot in Devon in 1903 is now in the collection of the Bristol Museum. Analysis of its teeth suggests that prior to its death, it had spent a significant amount of time in captivity.

In 1980, a puma was captured in Inverness-shire, Scotland, and was subsequently put into the Highland Wildlife Park zoo, being given the name "Felicity". Zoo director Eddie Orbell concluded that the animal had been tamed and might not have been released for long, noting that it enjoyed being tickled.

On two separate occasions, jungle cats have been found dead after being hit by a car, with the most accepted theory being that these are individuals escaped from private ownership.

In 1996, police in Fintona, County Tyrone, Northern Ireland, shot a cat. It was reportedly a caracal, a medium-sized wildcat species found in Africa and Asia, although a police report described it as a lynx.

In a well-reported 2001 case ("the Beast of Barnet"), a young female Eurasian lynx was captured alive by police and vets in Cricklewood, North London, after a chase across school playing fields and into a block of flats. It was placed in London Zoo and given the name "Lara" before ultimately being transferred to a zoo in France to breed. The captured lynx was found to be only 18 months old, although considerably larger than an average domestic cat.

In 2006, the Department for Environment, Food and Rural Affairs published a list of predatory cats typically kept as exotic pets that they know to have escaped in the United Kingdom, although most of these have been recaptured.

On 9 January 2025, two lynx were captured after being sighted in the Drumguish area near Kingussie, Scotland. They were put in quarantine at Highland Wildlife Park with plans to transfer them to Edinburgh Zoo. The lynx are believed to have been illegally released, given their tameness; and bedding was found in a layby near to the area of their capture. The following day, two more lynx were spotted in the same area and are believed to have been linked to the first two.

== See also ==
- Cryptozoology
- List of cryptids
- European wildcat
- Kellas cat, a type of hybrid cat resulting from natural crossbreeding between domestic cats and Scottish wildcats
- The Siege of White Deer Park – children's novel by Colin Dann featuring a big cat hiding in an English wood
