= Portmore =

Portmore may refer to:

- Portmore, Jamaica
  - Portmore United F.C.
- Portmore, a townland in County Antrim, Northern Ireland
- Portmore Lough in Northern Ireland
  - Bonny Portmore, a lament of a large oak which once stood near Portmore Lough
- Portmore, Hampshire
  - Earl of Portmore
