= Mary Girling =

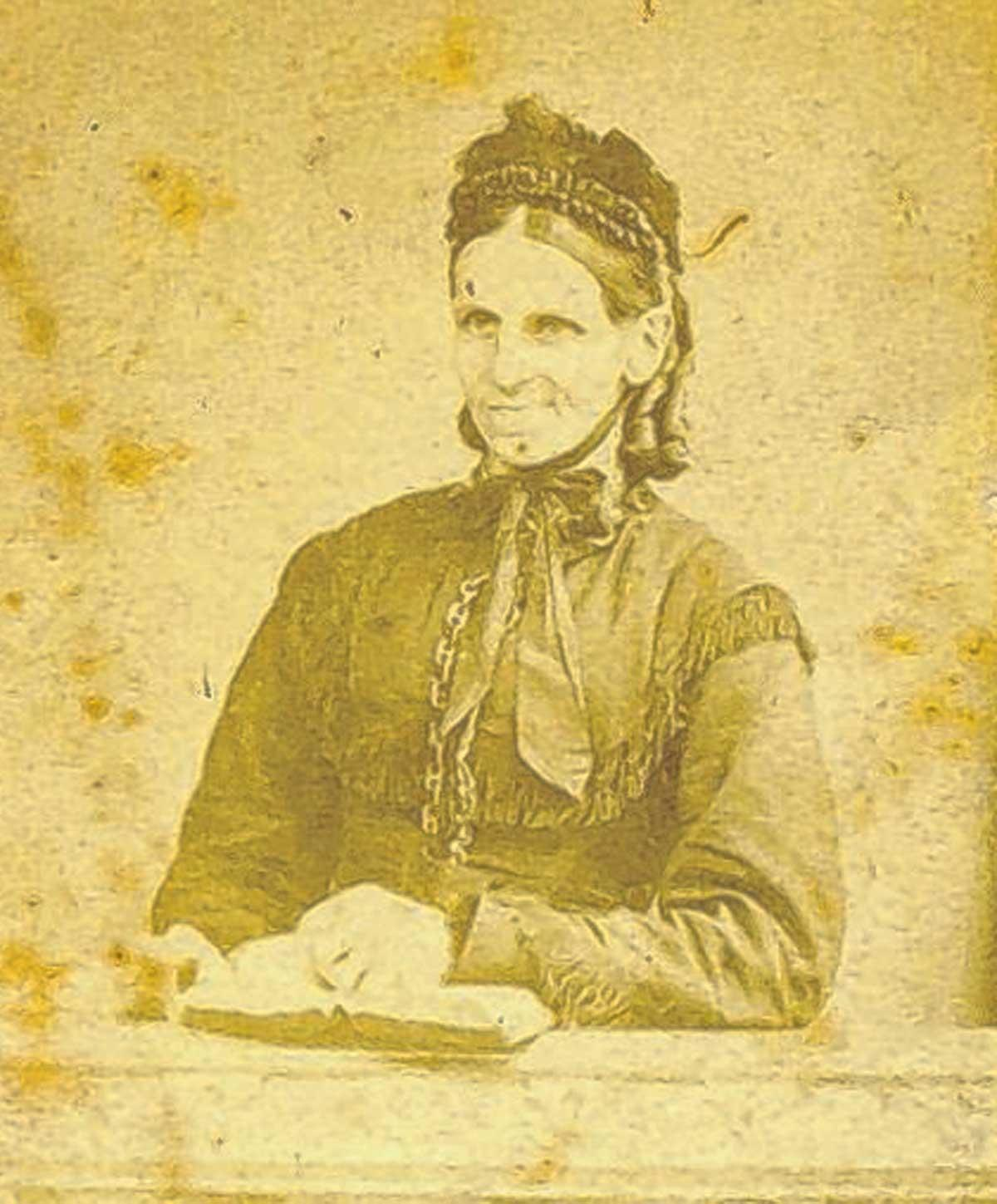
- The only known photograph of Mary Ann Girling
- Born: April 27, 1827; Little Glemham, Suffolk, England
- Died: September 18, 1886 (aged 59); Tiptoe, Hordle, Hampshire, England

Mary Ann Girling (27 April 1827–18 September 1886) was an English religious leader, the founder of the sect called "The People of God", also known as New Forest Shakers.

== Life ==
Girling was the daughter of William Clouting (or Clowting), a small farmer, born in the parish of Little Glemham, Suffolk, on 27 April 1827. She had little formal education, and her letters were full of spelling and grammatical errors, but she was considered to be quite intelligent. When she was 16, she married George Stanton Girling in the Anglican Church. He was first a seaman, then a fitter in an iron foundry, and afterwards a general dealer at Ipswich. She had eight miscarriages and two surviving children.

Girling had a vision of Jesus Christ on Christmas Day 1858; by Christmas 1864, she began to believe that she was a new incarnation of the Deity. One sign of this was in the stigmata which appeared on her hands, feet, and side. She was wont to describe with minute details the extraordinary emotion which overwhelmed her at the moment when she experienced the divine call. From that period she went about proclaiming the new revelation and speaking as with absolute knowledge of hidden mysteries.

She gathered around her a small company of men and women, belonging for the most part to the labouring classes. Their first meeting-place for public worship was at 107 Bridge Road, Battersea, London, where in August 1870 they attracted much attention. They were generally called shakers, but they themselves never accepted that name, but always spoke of their community as the Children of God.

By 1871, Girling had been barred from preaching in the Methodist chapels which she had previously attended. This was likely due in part to her style of preaching—an eyewitness who called her "the high priestess of Jumperism" wrote "the woman prayed volubly, and used her long arms freely in gesticulation…actually screaming in a which I thought might have caused a jump or two." However, it also reflected unease with her increasingly public claims to divinity.

On 2 January 1872, the Children of God removed from London and settled near Hordle in the New Forest, Hampshire, where Miss Julia Wood, a wealthy lady, had purchased for them a residence and a farm, known as New Forest Lodge. Wood gave £2,250 for the property, on which there remained a mortgage of £1,000. Here the community increased to 160 persons, who learnt to regard Mrs. Girling, ‘their mother,’ with tenderness, love, and reverence. She owed her authority over her people to her belief in herself and to her great force of will. Their faith in her endured through cold, hunger, and suffering, and many and repeated misfortunes.

It was believed that they would all live for ever, and that sooner or later everybody would acknowledge the divinity of Mrs. Girling, who would then rule over a peaceful world. She was a tall, lean woman, with an upright carriage, a strong, intelligent countenance, bright eyes, a very good expression, and a rather winning voice. She had scruples against going to law, which afterwards made her an easy prey to her enemies.

The community was industrious, and lived in a state of celibacy. It also followed Girling's prohibitions on trade, leading it to fall into debt and be evicted from New Forest Lodge on 15 December 1874. Girling was subsequently declared insane, though the verdict was overturned; several years later, Miss Wood was also declared insane and spent 24 years in an asylum.

The eviction took place in very severe weather, and the pitiable condition of the people excited much commiseration, particularly following reports that an infant had died of exposure. The community camped on the roadside for two days, when they had notice to leave, and part of the community returned to their homes in various parts of the country. A Mr. Beasley then offered them the use of a shed, where they remained for three weeks, but the place was not large enough for them all to sit down at one time. They next found a friend in the Hon. Auberon E. M. Herbert, who gave them the use of a barn on the Ashley Arnewood farm, Lymington, on the condition that Girling sign an agreement to "prevent any dances without clothes taking place among any of the brothers, sisters or children", reflecting the widespread belief that the Children of God engaged in orgies, witchcraft, and other unsavory practices. After staying in Herbert's barn for five weeks, they removed to a field which they formerly had on lease with New Forest Lodge; when this lease expired they were again turned into the roadway, and there they lived night and day for five weeks.

In 1879, Girling rented a two-acre farm called Tiptoe Farm, near Hordle. Here the community erected a number of wooden huts with canvas roofs, with a larger and superior hut as a place of public worship. The farm became a tourist attraction, with visitors arriving in charabancs on the weekends and buying quantities of beer from the nearby public house.

Girling publicly announced her divinity in a letter to local newspapers in February 1882. The only publication known to survive, however, is a four-page tract entitled The Close of the Dispensation: the Last Message to the Church and the World. It is signed ‘Jesus First and Last (Mary Ann Girling), Tiptoe, Hordle, near Lymington, Hants, 1883.’

In it she says:

I now close this letter with the true and loving declaration that I am the second appearing of Jesus, the Christ of God, the Bride, the Lamb's Wife, the God-mother and Saviour, life from heaven, and that there will not be another.

Latterly the Children of God escaped public notice, except from excursionists visiting the place. The cold and exposure at last told on Mrs. Girling, and she fell ill. During her illness she did not lose faith in what she had preached, and believed that she would never die, but would live until the second coming of Christ.

Girling was diagnosed with cancer of the womb and died at Tiptoe, Hordle, on 18 September 1886 (aged 59), and was buried in Hordle churchyard 22 September. A large crowd turned out for the funeral. Afterwards, those of the community who had friends returned to them, and only six persons were left to occupy the camp at Tiptoe.

Girling left children, among them a younger son, William Girling.

== Legacy ==
According to author Philip Hoare, Girling inspired Andrew Thomas Turton Peterson's interest in spiritualism and mesmerism. During a séance, Peterson claimed to have received the plans for what would become Peterson's Tower in Sway, Hampshire from Sir Christopher Wren.

In the 1870s and 1880s, local newspapers regularly reported "rescues" and escape attempts related to the Children of God, claiming that members of the community were terrified of Girling. "While under Mrs Girling's reign of terror", one was said to have written, "I was not allowed to write to you, or do anything only in strict accordance with her decrees."

Girling has also become the subject of urban legends. In Hampshire and Isle of Wight Folk Tales, author Michael O'Leary reports that in the 1990s, a group of young men who had robbed a service station stashed the money in Hordle churchyard. When one of them returned to claim it, he encountered "the tall, gaunt, angular figure of a woman, wearing a long, black Victorian dress and a large, black bonnet…and she was jumping–up and down–up and down…" The young man fled, and "The police found him the next day, crouching in a foetal position, rocking backwards and forwards, laughing and crying at the same time."
