= Philip Hoare =

English writer

- Born: Patrick Moore; 1958 (age 67–68); Southampton, England, UK
- Occupations: Writer, filmmaker and curator
- Website: www.philiphoare.co.uk

Philip Hoare (born 1958) is a British writer, film-maker and curator. He won the 2009 Samuel Johnson Prize, now known as the Baillie Gifford Prize for Non-Fiction, for his work Leviathan, or the Whale.

== Early life and education ==
Hoare was born Patrick Moore in Southampton. He chose the name Philip Hoare to avoid confusion with astronomer Patrick Moore:

A Roman Catholic, he attended St Mary's Independent School, Southampton on a scholarship. He went on to St Mary's University, Twickenham.

Imagine having to spend your entire life living with people asking: 'You're not that astronomer, are you?' Or: 'Do you play the xylophone?' Another reason was that when I was managing bands I used to review my own bands for the NME and Sounds as Philip Hoare. Philip was my confirmation name; Hoare [was] my mother's maiden name.

== Career ==
=== Music ===
In 1982–83, Hoare ran the record label Operation Twilight, a UK-based subsidiary of the Belgian label Les Disques du Crépuscule.

=== 2009 Samuel Johnson Prize ===
Hoare was the winner of the 2009 Samuel Johnson Prize, now known as the Baillie Gifford Prize for Non-Fiction, for his work Leviathan, or the Whale. The book, which describes a personal and societal fascination with whales, received praise. Jonathan Mirsky, writing for Literary Review, called the book "tremendous".

=== Other work ===
Hoare has recorded podcasts for NPR, VICE and Al Jazeera Media Network. His curatorial work includes Derek Jarman's Modern Nature, and he contributed to the Victoria and Albert Museum's international touring exhibition, David Bowie Is.

Hoare has written articles on whales, including one on the orca 'attacks' off the Iberian Peninsula in 2023. He is special ambassador for Whale and Dolphin Conservation, visiting fellow at the Fine Arts Work Center, Provincetown, and lecturer at the Rhode Island School of Design, Providence.

As a writer, Hoare has represented the British Council in Berlin, Guadalajara, and Moscow.

== Works ==
Hoare is the author of the following works of non-fiction:

- Serious Pleasures: The Life of Stephen Tennant (1990)
- Noël Coward: A Biography (1995)
- Wilde's Last Stand: Decadence, Conspiracy, and the First World War (1997)
- Spike Island: The Memory of a Military Hospital (2000), the story of Netley Hospital in Southampton
- The Ghosts of Netley (2004)
- England's Lost Eden: Adventures in a Victorian Utopia (2005), about Mary Anne Girling and the New Forest Shakers
- Leviathan or, The Whale (2008), which won the 2009 BBC Samuel Johnson Prize for non-fiction
- The Whale: In Search Of The Giants Of The Sea (2010)
- The Sea Inside (2013)
- RisingTideFallingStar (2017)
- Albert and the Whale: Albrecht Dürer and How Art Imagines Our World (2021) (Note: Briefly reviewed in the May 31, 2021 issue of The New Yorker, p.63.)
- William Blake and the Sea Monsters of Love (2025, 4th Estate)

He has also edited The Sayings of Noël Coward (1997).

Hoare has co-authored or contributed to the following publications:

- Essay on the evolution of class in the UK in a British Council pamphlet, Posh: The Evolution of the Traditional British Brand (ed. Sorrel Hershberg, 1999).
- An essay in Linder: Works 1976–2006 (2006), a collection about Linder Sterling.
- Gabriel Orozco (2006), exhibition catalogue and texts, with Mark Godfrey.
- Pet Shop Boys (2006), catalogue and texts, with Chris Heath.
- Introduction to David Austen (2007) (eds. Emma Dean and Michael Stanley).
- Foreword to Made in Southampton (2008), a box-set of prints.
- Provenance (2010), with Angela Cockayne, a response to Wunderkammen.
- Essay, "Something against nothing", in Tania Kovats (2011) (ed. Jeremy Millar).
- Dominion: A Whale Symposium (2012) (eds. Hoare and Angela Cockayne).
- Essay in Malicious Damage: the Defaced Library Books of Kenneth Halliwell and Joe Orton (2013), (ed. Ilsa Colsell).
- Essay in Southampton: A City Lost ... And Found (2013), a collection of drawings by Eric Meadus.
- Record of a discussion between Hoare, Christopher Frayling and Mark Kermode on David Bowie's cultural impact, in David Bowie is the subject (2013) (eds. Victoria Broackes and Geoffrey Marsh).
- Greetings from Darktown : an illustrator's miscellany, a collection of the work of Jonny Hannah, with texts by Hoare, Sheena Calvert and Peter Chrisp (2014).
- Foreword to As is the sea (2014), writing by students from the Royal College of Art (ed. Jessie Bond).
- Another Green World – Linn Botanic Gardens: Encounters with a Scottish Arcadia (2015), photographs by Alison Turnbull, text by Hoare.
