= East End, Hampshire =

Hamlet in Hampshire, England

Coordinates: 50.7750°N 1.4825°W

East End
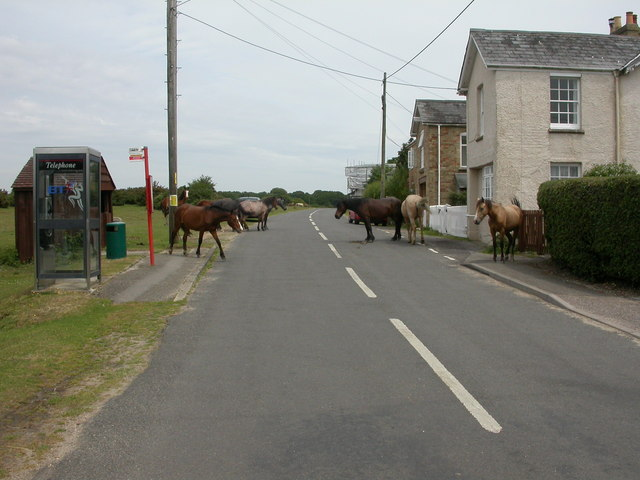
- East End

- Location within Hampshire
- OS grid reference: SZ366974
- Civil parish: East Boldre
- District: New Forest
- Shire county: Hampshire
- Region: South East
- Country: England
- Sovereign state: United Kingdom
- Post town: LYMINGTON
- Postcode district: SO41
- Dialling code: 01590
- Police: Hampshire and Isle of Wight
- Fire: Hampshire and Isle of Wight
- Ambulance: South Central
- UK Parliament: New Forest East

East End is a hamlet in the civil parish of East Boldre in the New Forest National Park of Hampshire, England. Its nearest town is Lymington, which lies approximately 4.2 miles (6.7 km) south-west from the hamlet.

== History ==
Although traditionally within the parish of Boldre, the name of the hamlet apparently derives from the fact that "East End Bridge" was also the easternmost point of the parliamentary borough of Lymington. The bridge in question is built over Crockford Stream which flows into Sowley Pond just to the southeast of East End. An Independent Chapel was built at East End in 1808, later to become Congregational and, subsequently, a United Reformed Church. The small brick building with its tiled roof survives as a commercial establishment. The hamlet of East End was included in the civil parish of East Boldre when the parish was created in 1929.

There is one inn called the "East End Arms". It was bought in the mid-1990s by John Illsley, former bass guitarist of the rock band, Dire Straits.
