= Robin Reilly =

British writer (1928–2016)

David Robin Reilly (3 January 1928 – 29 September 2016) was a British writer.

== Life and career ==
David Robin Reilly was born in Everton, Hampshire on 3 January 1928. He authored works on the Wedgwood company and military history. Reilly served as a senior director of Wedgwood's for 12 years. He died on 29 September 2016, aged 88.

== Works ==
- Portrait Waxes: An Introduction for Collectors (London: Batsford, 1953).
- The Rest to Fortune: The Life of Major-General James Wolfe (London: Cassell, 1960).
- The Sixth Floor (London: Leslie Frewin, 1969).
- Wedgwood: The Portrait Medallions, co-authored with George Savage (London: Barrie & Jenkins, 1973).
- Wedgwood Portrait Medallions: An Introduction (London: Barrie & Jenkins, 1973).
- The British at the Gates: The New Orleans Campaign in the War of 1812 (New York: G. P. Putnam's Sons, 1974). (rev. ed., 2002).
- Pitt the Younger, 1759–1806 (London: Cassell, 1978).
- Wedgwood, two volumes (London: Macmillan, 1989).
- Josiah Wedgwood, 1730–1795 (London: Macmillan, 1992).
- Wedgwood Jasper (London: Thames and Hudson, 1994).
- 'Wondrous surprises', RSA Journal, Vol. 143, No. 5462 (August/September 1995), pp. 82–83.
