= Tiptoe, Hampshire =

Village and parish in Hampshire, England

Coordinates: 50°46′44″N 1°38′17″W

Tiptoe
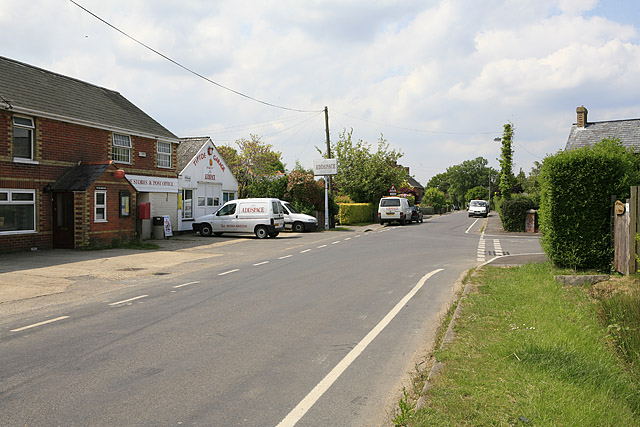
- Tiptoe

- Location within Hampshire
- OS grid reference: SZ256977
- District: New Forest
- Shire county: Hampshire
- Region: South East
- Country: England
- Sovereign state: United Kingdom
- Post town: LYMINGTON
- Postcode district: SO41 6
- Police: Hampshire and Isle of Wight
- Fire: Hampshire and Isle of Wight
- Ambulance: South Central
- UK Parliament: New Forest West

Tiptoe is a small village in the New Forest National Park in Hampshire, England. It lies mostly within the civil parish of Hordle and partly within the civil parish of Sway. It is 1 1/2 miles (2.4 km) west of Sway village, and about 2 miles (3.2 km) northeast of the town of New Milton.

Tiptoe had just under 100 residents in 2007. It has two churches, and a primary school with an associated pre-school. The parish church is dedicated to Saint Andrew and is the daughter church of All Saints’ at Hordle. The Tiptoe Stores and Post Office closed in 2008, despite a campaign to save it. Just outside the village lies the Plough Inn, the premises of which date from about 1630.

== History ==
The name of the village derives from a surname of French origin recorded in the 13th century as "Typetot". A member of the "Tibetot" family is known to have held land in the Barton area in the early 14th century.

Tiptoe achieved some notoriety in the 1880s when Mary Ann Girling and her religious sect of New Forest Shakers erected tents at a farm at Tiptoe in 1879, having been evicted from their previous residence at Forest Lodge, Hordle. Girling believed the Second Coming of Christ would soon occur and that she would live forever. She died at the Tiptoe farm on 18 September 1886.

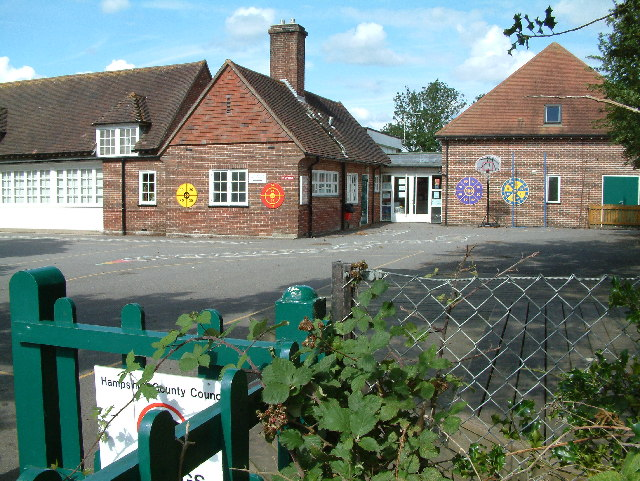
Tiptoe Primary School

A school was built at Tiptoe at the beginning of the 20th century as a replacement for an earlier school in nearby Wootton which burned down in 1914.

St Andrew's Hall on Sway Road, Tiptoe, is a corrugated iron building dating from around 1870. It was initially a chapel at Netley Hospital. It was brought to Tiptoe as a chapel of ease for Hordle Parish Church and is now used as a hall.
