= Peter Barrett (cricketer) =

English cricketer

Personal information
- Full name: Peter Barrett
- Born: 3 June 1955; Winchester, Hampshire, England
- Died: 28 October 1983 (aged 28); Everton, Hampshire, England
- Batting: Left-handed
- Bowling: Unknown

Domestic team information
- Years: Team
- 1975–1976: Hampshire

Career statistics
Competition	First-class	List A
Matches	6	1
Runs scored	138	28
Batting average	12.54	28.00
100s/50s	–/–	0/0
Top score	26	28
Balls bowled	6	0
Wickets	0	–
Bowling average	–	–
5 wickets in innings	–	–
10 wickets in match	–	–
Best bowling	–	–
Catches/stumpings	–/–	–/–
- Source: Cricinfo, 12 December 2009

Peter Barrett (3 June 1955 – 28 October 1983) was an English first-class cricketer.

Barrett was born at Winchester in June 1955. He made his debut in first-class cricket for Hampshire against Yorkshire in the 1975 County Championship. He made five further first-class appearances, the last of which came against Somerset in the 1976 County Championship. In his six matches, he scored 138 runs at an average of 12.54, with a high score of 26. He made his only List A one-day appearance against Essex in the 1976 John Player League. In this match, he scored 28 runs before being dismissed by Stuart Turner.

Outside of county cricket, Barrett played club cricket for Lymington Cricket Club. He was killed on 28 October 1983 at the age of 28 at Everton, Hampshire, when the moped he was riding hit a kerb and he was thrown off into the road.
