= Geoffrey Marsh =

Geoffrey Marsh may refer to:

- Charles L. Grant or Geoffrey Marsh (1942–2006), American writer
- Geoffrey Marsh (museum director) (born 1957), director of the London Theatre Museum, now V&A Theatre Collections
- Geoff Marsh (born 1958), Australian cricketer, coach, and selector

== See also ==
- Jeff "Swampy" Marsh (born 1960), American animator
- Jeffrey Marsh (born 1977), American writer, activist and social media personality
