= Pilley =

Pilley may refer to:

Places

- Pilley, Gloucestershire, England
- Pilley, Hampshire, England
- Pilley, South Yorkshire, England

People

- Cameron Pilley (born 1982), professional squash player
- Dorothy Pilley Richards (1894-1986), prominent female mountaineer
- Teddy (Thaddeus) Pilley (1909-1982), conference interpreter

== See also ==
- Pilley's Island, Newfoundland and Labrador
