= New Forest Shakers =

The New Forest Shakers or Walworth Jumpers (also Children of God, Girlingites or Convulsionists) were a new religious movement created by Mary Anne Girling (or Mary Ann Girling) in the 1870s in England. Originally from Suffolk, Girling preached the Second Coming, celibacy, chastity and communal life.

== In Suffolk ==
Mary Ann Clouting was born in Little Glemham, Suffolk in 1827. She married George Stanton Girling and they had two children. Sometime around 1858, Girling received a vision from Jesus Christ in her Ipswich bedroom. She apparently received a second vision in 1864 informing her that the second coming was at hand. Girling left her husband and children, and travelled around the villages and towns of Suffolk preaching her mission. Within 18 months "Girlingism" had 50 adherents. This ecstatic, esoteric sect claimed that they died with conversion, and were then reborn to eternal life.

== Walworth Jumpers ==
In 1871, having been persecuted and threatened in Suffolk, Girling went to London. She initially fell in with the Peculiar People of Plumstead and preached to them there. She soon fell out with them when she began claiming her own divinity, and she withdrew from their circle taking many of their followers with her. Girling's mission began operating from a railway arch near the Walworth Road, where she preached excitedly before crowds of several thousands, which led to the nickname "the Jumpers of Walworth." Attacked by hostile mobs in London, Girling announced to her followers in 1872 that they were going to move to Hordle in the New Forest in Hampshire.

== New Forest Shakers ==
In January 1873 Girling and her followers arrived in Hordle. They settled in New Forest Lodge, a house which was partially paid for by one of the followers Julia Wood, the remainder being mortgaged. 160 believers gathered there, cultivating vegetables and worshipping. They were prohibited from sexual activity, as well as from economic transactions. They proceeded to farm the land, but Girling forbade the sect to sell either their produce or their labour. The mortgage remained unpaid and on a bitterly cold night of December 1874, in the rain, sleet and snow, 60 women, 35 men and 45 children were evicted. All the furniture was left along a half mile stretch of the road. It included 3 pianos, 77 beds, boxes of eggs, butter and vegetables valued at about £1,000 and worthless by the end of the night.

They were aided by the political philosopher Auberon Herbert, who gave them temporary shelter on his estate in nearby Ashley. Other prominent sympathisers of their plight included liberal politician William Cowper, and local eccentric and spiritualist Andrew Peterson. By February 1875, they had returned to Hordle, camping in a field near New Forest Lodge. They were evicted in 1878, but a local landowner gave them a field in nearby Tiptoe where they set up camp. After this, the sect faded from national prominence. The census of 1881 records 64 people were encamped in the field, but by 1886 the community was reduced to 12 women and 8 men. Girling died from uterine cancer on 18 September 1886 and the sect broke up. Girling was buried in Hordle churchyard.
