= Hordle =

Village and parish in Hampshire, England

Coordinates: 50.7603°N 1.6212°W

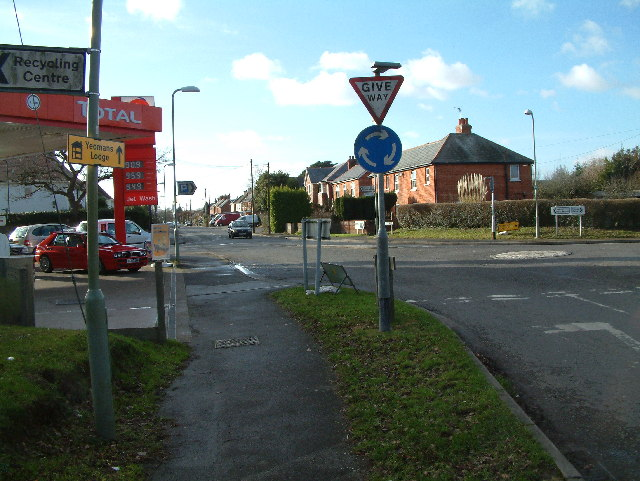
- Looking west along Ashley Lane

- Location within Hampshire
- Population: 5,746 (2021 census)
- OS grid reference: SZ268957
- District: New Forest
- Shire county: Hampshire
- Region: South East
- Country: England
- Sovereign state: United Kingdom
- Post town: Lymington
- Postcode district: SO41
- Dialling code: 01425/01590
- Police: Hampshire and Isle of Wight
- Fire: Hampshire and Isle of Wight
- Ambulance: South Central
- UK Parliament: New Forest West

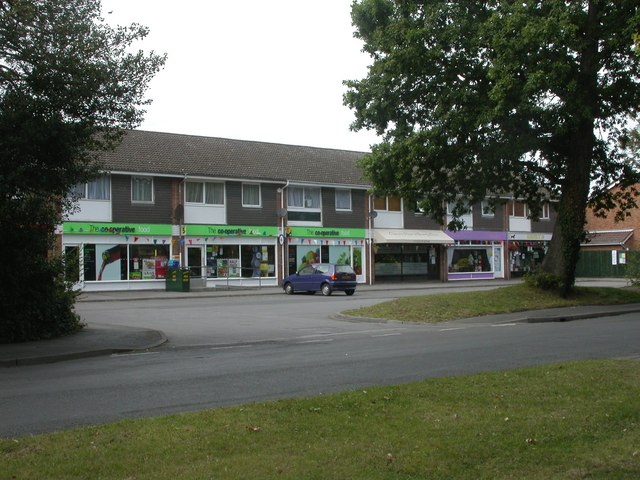
Shopping parade

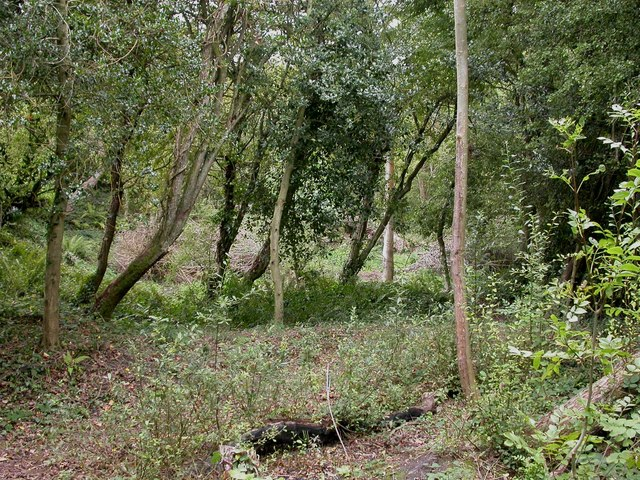
Community woodland on Golden Hill

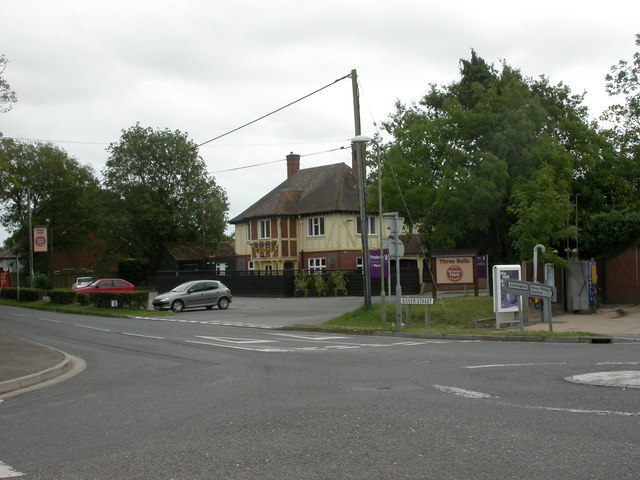
Premier Inn

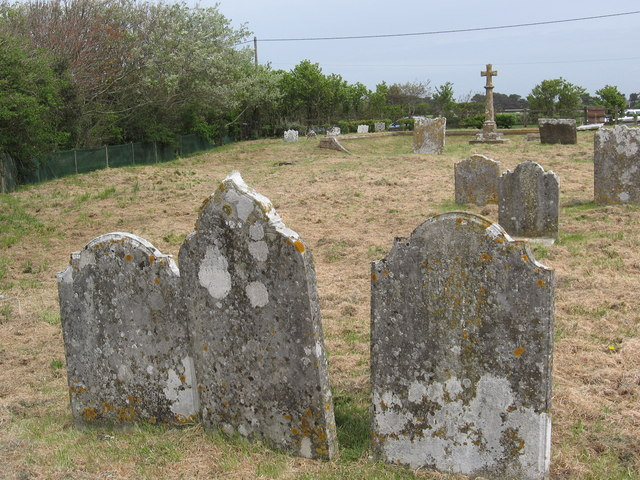
Graveyard at Hordle Cliff, and site of the original church

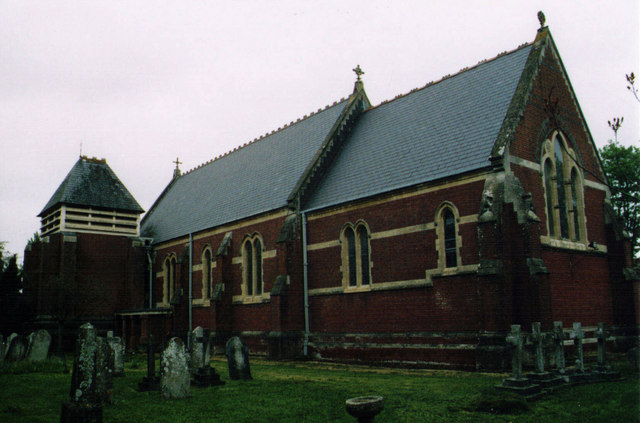
Modern church of All Saints

Hordle is a village and civil parish in the county of Hampshire, England. It is situated between the Solent coast and the New Forest, and is bordered by the towns of Lymington and New Milton. Like many New Forest parishes, Hordle has no village centre. The civil parish includes the hamlets of Tiptoe and Everton as well as part of Downton, and had a population of 5,746 in 2021. The parish was originally much larger, stretching from the New Forest boundary to Hurst Castle.

Hordle has several shops including a pharmacy, and Co-operative Stores. The village also has a primary school, and it did have a pub, The Three Bells, but it closed some years ago. The building is now a hotel. Although there is no pub, there is a cidery, Miners Cider, in Silver Street, where local ciders are available, late into the evening.

== History ==
The name Hordle is generally believed to mean hoard hill – OE hordhyll – (treasure hill), There is no connection with "Golden Hill" which lies on the main road from Hordle to Ashley and which is a Victorian invention as is Silver Street. In modern times, one 4th-century copper coin (of Maximus) has been found in a garden near Golden Hill.

Hordle is listed in the Domesday Book of 1086 when it comprised the manors of Hordle and Arnwood. Hordle manor then belonged to Oidelard, who held it of Ralph de Mortimer. Afterwards held by the de Redvers family, Earls of Devon, it was granted to Pagan Trenchard around 1140. Two separate manors evolved, one the Trenchard Manor and the other that held by Breamore Priory.

The priory manor was afterwards known as the manor of Hordle Breamore. The priory continued to hold the estate up to the Dissolution. In 1537 the estate was granted to Henry Courtenay, 1st Marquess of Exeter and his wife Gertrude. In 1578, however, it belonged to Thomas Carew, who dying that year was succeeded by his son Henry. It passed to his son Henry in 1614, and then to his son George in 1639. It passed through various hands until it was purchased in 1863 by Colonel Frederick Clinton whose family sold the estate in the 1950s.

The manor of Hordle Trenchard was held by Henry Trenchard in the 13th century together with Sharprix (modern Walhampton). His successor John Trenchard was in 1309 described as chief lord of Hordle, and in 1346 the estate belonged to another Henry Trenchard. In 1428 John Trenchard was lord of Hordle, but later in the same year, no doubt after his death, Robert Dingley and John Lisle owned the half fee which had once belonged to him. In 1633 it was again in the hands of a distantly related branch of the Trenchards, Sir Thomas Trenchard, suffering a recovery of the manor of Hordle, which had belonged to his father, Sir George. In 1747 the manor was sold to William Rickman and a few years later it was acquired by Edward Ives, who in 1773 conveyed it to John Missing. It probably merged with the main manor in the 19th century.

The Domesday Book mentions a watermill at Hordle, although this has long since disappeared. An 18th-century watermill is visible nearby at Gordleton, just to the east of the present village. Another 18th-century mill at Efford lies on the border of the parish with Pennington.

With the enclosure of Arnewood Common in the early nineteenth century, the main centre of population moved northwards, away from the coast, and to meet this change the ancient parish church was demolished in 1830 and moved to its present situation close to the now enclosed Downton Common, two miles (3 km) to the north. There was no school in the parish until 1860. In the 1870s, Hordle Grange on Vaggs Lane was, for 3 years, home to the religious sect known locally as the New Forest Shakers. They were eventually evicted from this home and they moved to nearby Tiptoe, where they lived in tents until their leader, Mary Ann Girling, died in 1886.

After about 1920 considerable infilling took place in the parish and this accelerated in the 1950s and 60s leading to a much increased population that largely seeks its livelihood in the neighbouring towns of Lymington and New Milton. The parish population in 1801 was 446 and by 1931 this had increased by a thousand and it has gone on growing ever since. Hordle today, despite considerable growth, still manages to retain its rural character helped by the green belts that separate it from the adjoining parishes. The population of the parish in the 2001 census was 5,271 people.

Buildings of national importance are no longer within the parish boundary. These are Hurst Castle, one of Henry VIII's defensive works, and Sway tower (also known as Arnewood or Peterson's tower) the tallest non-reinforced concrete construction in the world.

=== The church ===
A church is recorded in the cartulary of Christchurch Priory early in the twelfth century. From very early times Hordle was a parochial chapelry of the vicarage of Milford and served by the vicar, until February 1867 when Hordle was declared a vicarage distinct from that of Milford. The old church was pulled down in 1830 being derelict. The site of the old church is at Hordle Cliff, about 2 miles to the south of the present village, and consists only of a graveyard inclosure.

Several illustrations of the old church are preserved at the vicarage and show it to have consisted of chancel, north and south transepts with chapels, nave and central bell turret. The south door at least was of 12th-century date. The present parish church, All Saints, was built in 1872 and succeeded a previous building on the same site dating from 1830. The church's organ case dates to 1877 and was designed by John Francis Bentley.

=== Saltmaking ===
The Domesday Book mentions six saltpans here but the industry declined thereafter and ceased well before the end of the 14th century apart from a saltworks on Hurst Spit.

== Geography ==
The present civil parish is somewhat smaller than the 3,854 acres (15.60 km^{2}) it used to contain, but still includes the hamlets of Tiptoe and Everton. Originally the parish included both Hurst Spit (and Hurst Castle) as well as Sway tower. During the 19th century, Hurst Spit and adjacent areas were transferred to Milford whilst the hamlet of Everton was included in Hordle. Similarly, a northwestern section was transferred to the newly created parish of Sway.

The soils of the parish are based mainly on well drained gravels to the south and clayey loams to the north: the character of the parish is agricultural, although in medieval times a few saltworks were operated on the coast.

A local tradition holds that the original was near the old church and has disappeared into the sea. Although this a myth, there is real and ongoing coastal erosion.

== Demographics ==
Census population of Hordle parish
Census	Population	Female	Male	Households	Source
2001	5,271	2,803	2,468	2,350	
2011	5,654	2,990	2,664	2,528	
2021	5,746	3,022	2,724	2,577	
