= David Bowie Is =

Touring museum exhibition

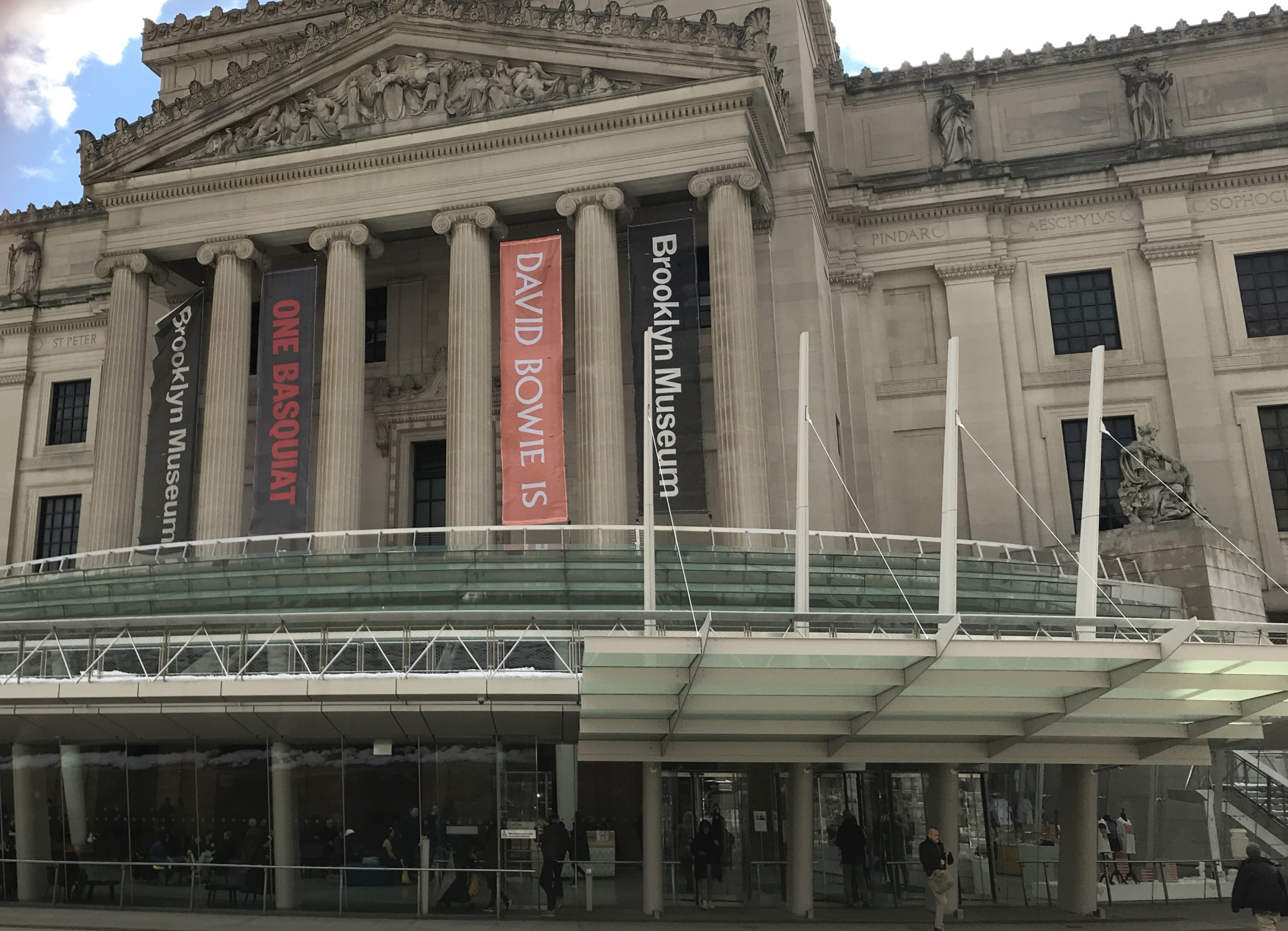
- A view of the Brooklyn Museum in New York flying a David Bowie Is banner in March 2018
- Date: 23 March 2013 – 15 July 2018
- Type: Museum exhibition
- Theme: David Bowie

David Bowie Is was a touring museum exhibition displaying history, artefacts and information about the life, music, films, tours, and art of the English singer-songwriter and actor David Bowie.

The show opened in March 2013 at the Victoria and Albert Museum in London and ended in July 2018 at the Brooklyn Museum in New York City. Over its five-year run, it stopped at 12 museums around the world and attracted over two million visitors. At each museum, the exhibition displayed about 500 objects; often a few hundred were unique to that particular museum. An accompanying documentary film, also titled David Bowie Is, was directed by Hamish Hamilton, Katy Mullan, and Hanif Kureishi.

After the exhibition closed in July 2018, it was announced that in early 2019 a new, virtual version of the exhibition would be released on virtual and augmented reality platforms.

== Background ==
Bowie had retreated from public view following his 2003–04 A Reality Tour in support of his album Reality (2003), and his long hiatus had led journalists to speculate that Bowie had retired from music. Bowie recorded his next album, The Next Day, in secret and released its first single, "Where Are We Now?" on 8 January 2013, his 66th birthday, with no prior announcement. The album itself was released over several dates in different regions, from 8 March in Australia, New Zealand and several European countries to 13 March in Japan. The album went to number one in the UK and number two in the US, and was praised as one of his best albums in decades. In this environment, the David Bowie Is exhibit opened on 23 March 2013.

== Exhibit timeline ==
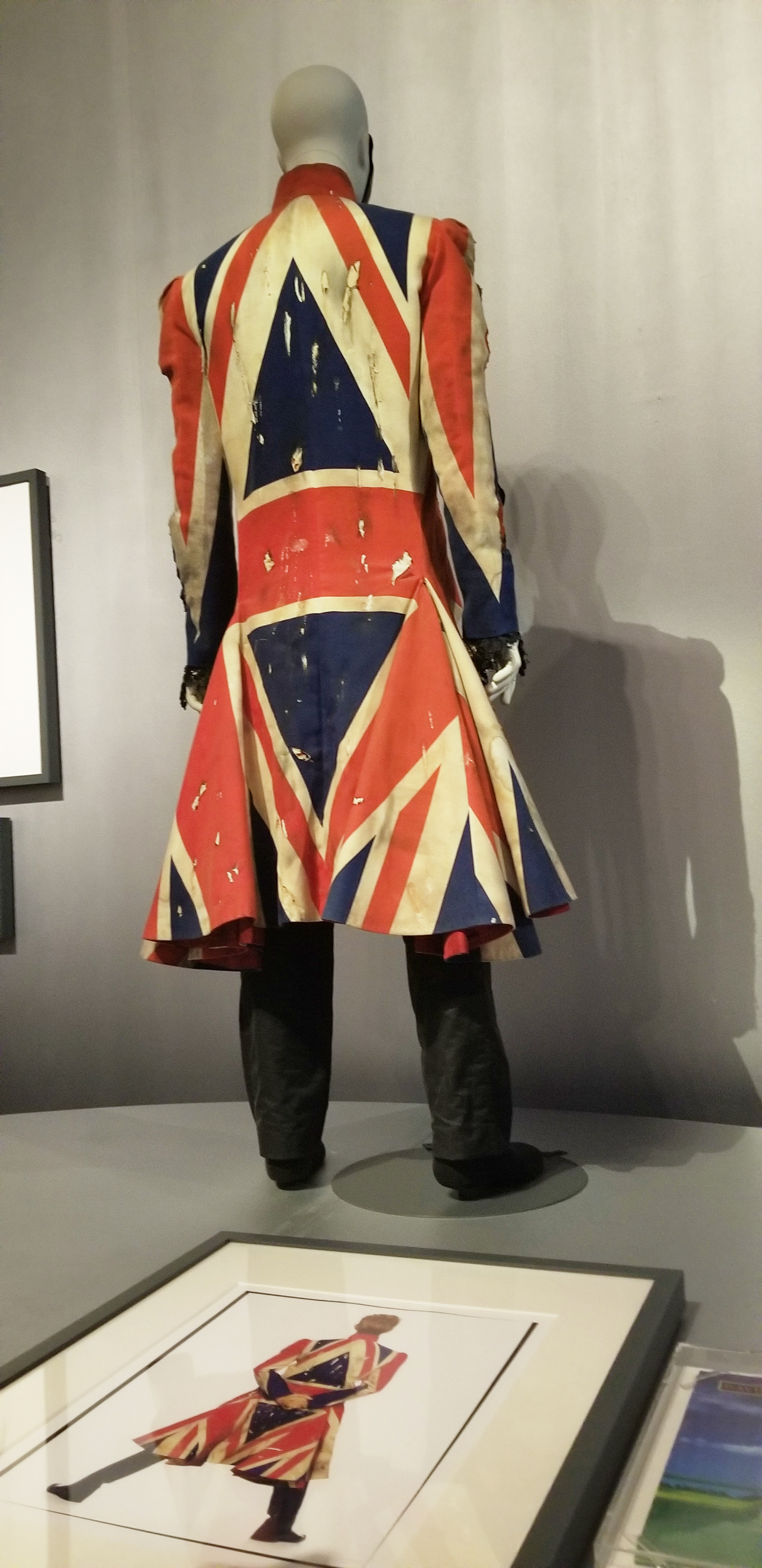
The Union Jack coat, worn by Bowie on the cover of his 1997 album Earthling, on display at the David Bowie Is exhibition in 2018.

Near the end of 2010, an archivist for Bowie's collection contacted the Victoria and Albert Museum (V&A) and asked if they'd be interested in a display. Bowie had saved most of the artefacts, costumes and props from his career, and had almost 75,000 pieces in a private collection.

Bowie allowed Victoria Broackes and Geoffrey Marsh, the V&A museum curators, free access to his archives for the show, although he did not get involved with how the pieces were displayed, nor the narrative of the show itself. Broackes and Marsh said that Bowie was "at the top of a very short list of people the V&A would cover as a single artist," and that Bowie "had one of the most, if not the most, complete archive of any pop music artist" they had ever seen. Broackes said that they got everything they asked for to display, except for items that had gone missing, such as Bowie's dress worn for the cover of his album The Man Who Sold the World (1970).

According to museum directors at the Brooklyn Museum, "David Bowie asked that the exhibit open in London and close here [in New York]". The V&A worked with 59 Productions and Real Studios to design the exhibition.

When the show was first booked at the V&A it was not generally believed that the exhibition would be very successful, but it became the museum's fastest-selling show, with over 300,000 visitors. The success of the show at the V&A resulted in the decision to take the exhibition on tour, and it has sold roughly two million tickets across 11 cities around the world as of March 2018. As of 2018, David Bowie Is holds the record for being the most visited exhibition in the V&A's history.

When Bowie died in early 2016, the museum tour was almost cancelled, with concerns for whether and how the show would go on. There were also discussions as to whether to keep the name in the present tense as David Bowie Is. Instead the duration of the exhibition, which was at the Groninger Museum in the Netherlands at the time, was extended by four weeks to allow grieving fans to attend.

== Exhibition contents ==
A typical stop of the exhibition included around 500 objects, including over 60 performance costumes, handwritten lyrics, and Bowie's own oil paintings. The exhibition was organised thematically rather than chronologically. It included outfits designed by Alexander McQueen, Hedi Slimane, Issey Miyake, Vivienne Westwood and Kansai Yamamoto. There were over 50 video pieces, including television performances, music videos and concert footage. Music journalist Dan Hyman wrote in Rolling Stone of the Chicago exhibition that the retrospective taught him five things about Bowie, namely that Bowie was "a fantastic painter and illustrator", "an avid collector of minutiae", "a style icon", "a tech geek at heart", and "an unflinching self-editor".

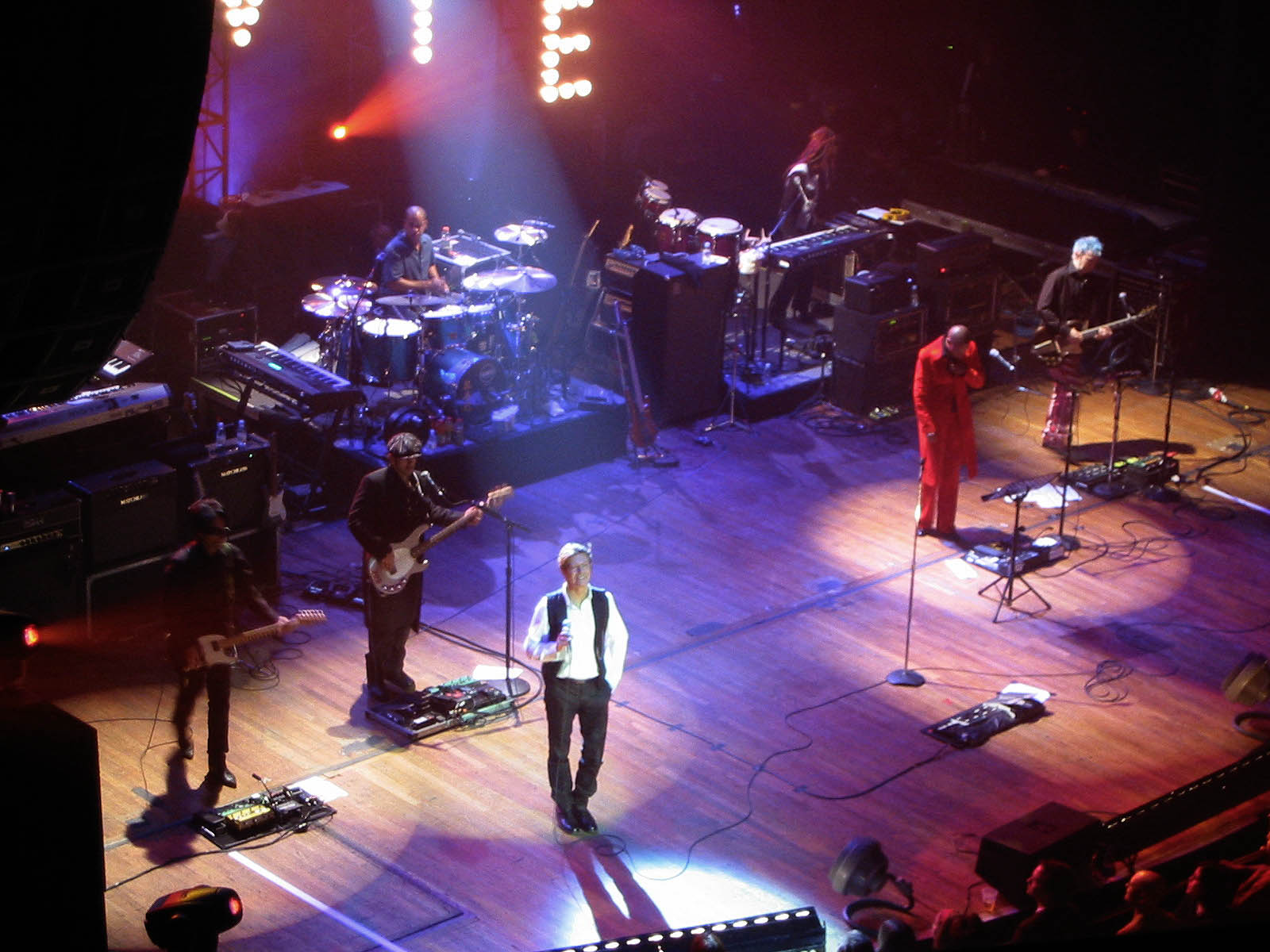
David Bowie on stage during his Heathen Tour in 2002; a portion of the lights' "W","I" and "E" are visible at the top of the picture.

Some museums included items unique to their country or city, reflecting Bowie's connection to the area. For example, in New York, where Bowie lived, Brooklyn Museum's Matthew Yokobosky said "We have the original backdrop from when he performed in The Elephant Man on Broadway, and moments from when he worked on Julian Schnabel's film Basquiat, on the life of New York artist Jean-Michel Basquiat... While most of the Young Americans album was recorded in Philadelphia, "Fame" was actually recorded in New York City. That's how John Lennon just happened to stop by the studio that day. He [Lennon] actually did a drawing for David in the studio and I have that drawing in the show." Yokobosky also spoke about how and why they got the letters "BOWIE" for the exhibition: "The first time I met with Bowie's archivist at the archive, I looked down one of the aisles and saw a photograph of the letter W resting on a case. I asked what it was, and the archivist told me that it corresponded to one of the letters from Bowie's New York marathon tour in 2002, when he played five theaters in five boroughs of the city in five days—and every night they moved these brilliant letters which spelled out his name in light bulbs. Well, I saw that tour in the Beacon Theater, and I just blurted out, 'I want the letters.' They hadn't been seen since that tour, and we spent two months trying to figure out how to get them to work again."

While in Berlin at the Martin-Gropius-Bau museum, the exhibition added pieces from Bowie's time in West Berlin, his collaborations with Iggy Pop, and his Berlin Trilogy: Low (1977), "Heroes" (1977), and Lodger (1979).

When David Bowie Is opened in Tokyo, pieces from Bowie's Japanese collaborator Kansai Yamamoto were highlighted. Yamamoto designed costumes for Bowie during his Ziggy Stardust (1972) and Aladdin Sane (1973) periods.

Scottish artist Paul Robertson contributed "The Periodic Table of Bowie" to the exhibition, a faux–periodic table of artists who have influenced, or were influenced by, Bowie over his career.

The final stop of David Bowie Is at the Brooklyn Museum (2 March to 15 July 2018) saw the release of the album Live In Berlin (1978), as well as a 7" single containing the US single edit of "Time"/"The Prettiest Star". There was also the red vinyl version of iSelect, a 12-song compilation, which had first been made available in this format at the Paris exhibition. Live In Berlin was recorded on 16 May 1978 at the Deutschlandhalle in West Berlin during Bowie's Isolar II Tour.

== Technology ==
The V&A worked with audio company Sennheiser to create a custom audio experience for the exhibition. Originally the curators were nervous to ask visitors to wear headphones, fearing it would isolate them. As visitors walked around the exhibition, the audio changed as they entered "spheres" of Bowie's work, relating to particular events, people or cities where Bowie had worked. The headphones required no interaction; the music and information one heard simply changed as one approached different parts of the exhibition. Producer Tony Visconti, who worked with Bowie for many years, created a unique megamix from the master tapes of more than 60 Bowie songs for the exhibition.

Part of the exhibition included a cavernous room with large video screens displaying various live Bowie performances throughout the years and featuring surround sound, in which visitors were asked to remove their headphones.

== Augmented reality app ==
Announced in 2018, the augmented reality application was released on iOS and android devices on 8 January 2019, coinciding with Bowie's birthday. The actor Gary Oldman, a friend of Bowie's, provides the voice-over for the application, which allows users virtual access to the costumes, videos, handwritten lyrics, and original works of art as seen in the museum show. The application also includes access to "dozens" of items that were not part of the original exhibition.

== Dates of museum shows ==
Museum	Location	Opened	Closed
Victoria and Albert Museum	London, United Kingdom	23 March 2013	11 August 2013
Art Gallery of Ontario (AGO)	Toronto, Ontario, Canada	25 September 2013	27/29 November 2013
Museu da Imagem e do Som (MIS)	São Paulo, Brazil	31 January 2014	20 April 2014
Martin-Gropius-Bau	Berlin, Germany	20 May 2014	24 August 2014
Museum of Contemporary Art	Chicago, United States	23 September 2014	4 January 2015
Philharmonie de Paris	Paris, France	2/3 March 2015	31 May 2015
ACMI	Melbourne, Australia	16 July 2015	1 November 2015
Groninger Museum	Groningen, Netherlands	11/15 December 2015	10 April 2016 (extended by 4 weeks from 13 March due to Bowie's death)
Museo d'Arte Moderna di Bologna (MAMbo)	Bologna, Italy	14 July 2016	13 November 2016
Warehouse Terrada G1 Building	Tokyo, Japan	8 January 2017	9 April 2017
Museu del Disseny de Barcelona (Barcelona Design Museum)	Barcelona, Catalonia, Spain	25 May 2017	15 October 2017
Brooklyn Museum	New York City, United States	2 March 2018	15 July 2018

== See also ==
- David Bowie's art collection
