= Norley Wood =

Hamlet in Hampshire, England

Coordinates: 50.7771°N 1.4960°W

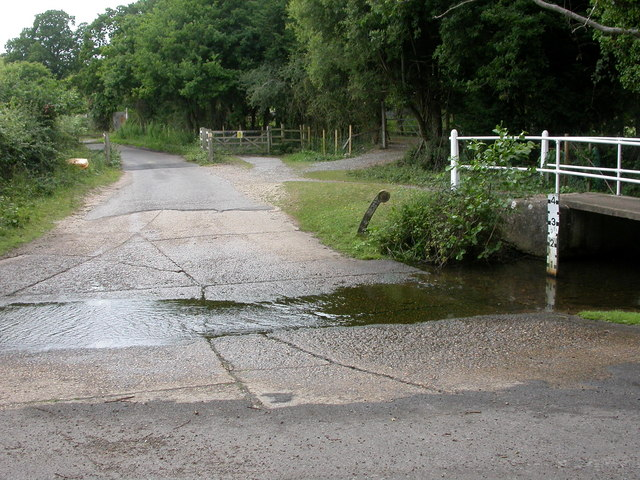
- Ford at Norleywood

- Location within Hampshire
- OS grid reference: SZ356976
- Civil parish: Boldre
- District: New Forest
- Shire county: Hampshire
- Region: South East
- Country: England
- Sovereign state: United Kingdom
- Post town: LYMINGTON
- Postcode district: SO41
- Dialling code: 01590
- Police: Hampshire and Isle of Wight
- Fire: Hampshire and Isle of Wight
- Ambulance: South Central
- UK Parliament: New Forest West

Norley Wood (or Norleywood) is a hamlet in the New Forest National Park of Hampshire, England. It is in the civil parish of Boldre. Its nearest town is Lymington, which lies approximately 3 miles (4.7 km) south-west from the village.
