= Portmore Lough =

Lake near Lough Neagh, Northern Ireland

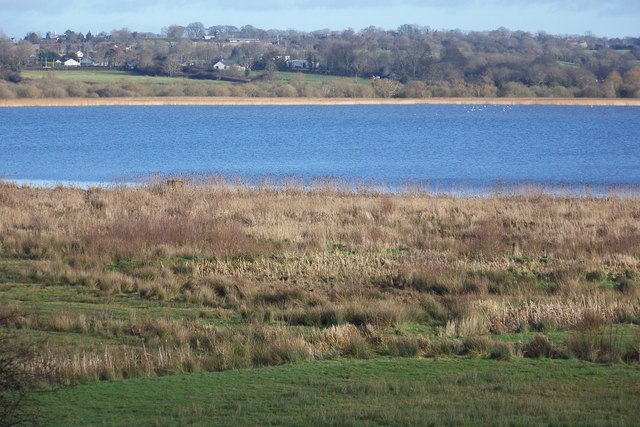

- Location in Northern Ireland
- Location: County Antrim, Northern Ireland
- Coordinates: 54°34′N 6°15′W
- Type: lough
- Surface area: 286 hectares (710 acres)

Portmore Lough (from Irish Loch an Phoirt Mhóir 'lake of the great landing place') is a small lake in southwest County Antrim, Northern Ireland that drains water into nearby Lough Neagh. It is roughly circular and covers an area of 286 hectares (710 acres). The Lough and its shoreland is designated a Ramsar site, a Special Protection Area (SPA) and an Area of Special Scientific Interest (ASSI). The lough is now part of a Royal Society for the Protection of Birds nature reserve.

The lough is near the site of the former Portmore Castle, erected in 1664 and removed in 1761. It is also the presumed location of the Portmore Ornament Tree whose demise in a windstorm of 1760 is lamented in the Irish folk song, Bonny Portmore.

Portmore Lough has the alternative name Lough Beg (Loch Bheag, or "small lake"), not to be confused with the Lough Beg on the Lower Bann.
