= Portmore, Hampshire =

Hamlet in Hampshire, England

Coordinates: 50.773850°N 1.52253°W

Portmore
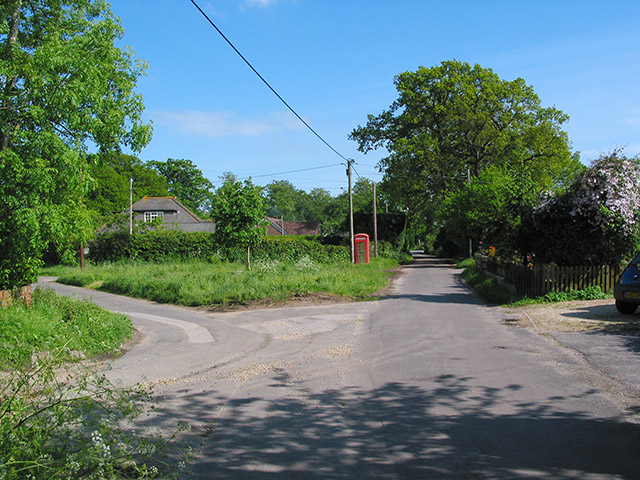
- Portmore

- Location within Hampshire
- OS grid reference: SZ3376497249
- Civil parish: Boldre
- District: New Forest
- Shire county: Hampshire
- Region: South East
- Country: England
- Sovereign state: United Kingdom
- Post town: LYMINGTON
- Postcode district: SO41
- Police: Hampshire and Isle of Wight
- Fire: Hampshire and Isle of Wight
- Ambulance: South Central
- UK Parliament: New Forest West

Portmore is a hamlet in the New Forest National Park of Hampshire, England. It is in the civil parish of Boldre. Its nearest town is Lymington, which lies approximately 1.3 miles (2.7 km) south-west from the village.
