= East Boldre =

Village and parish in Hampshire, England

Coordinates: 50.8011°N 1.4707°W

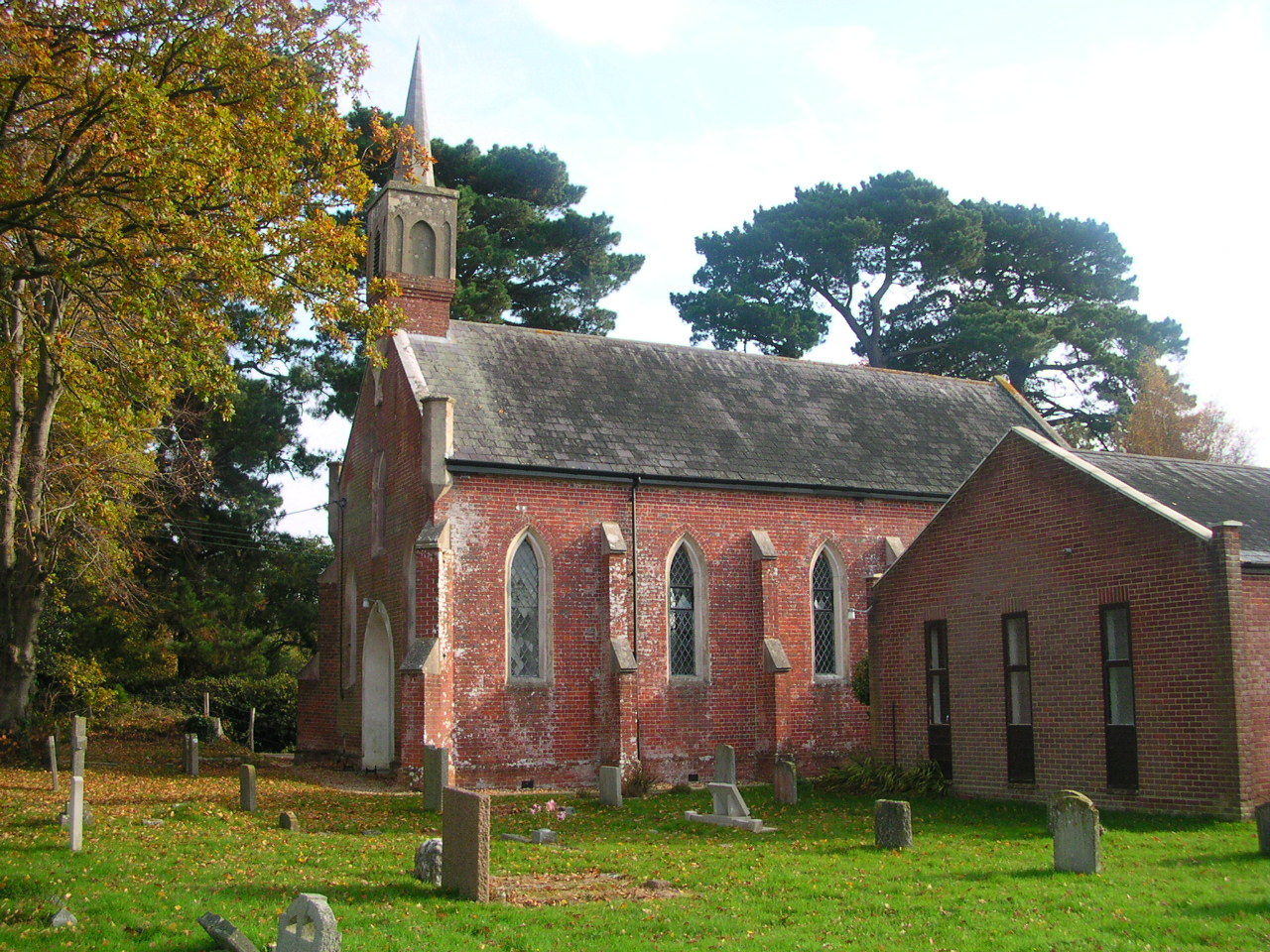
- St. Paul's church, East Boldre

- Location within Hampshire
- Population: 847; 832 (2011 Census)
- OS grid reference: SU374003
- Civil parish: East Boldre
- District: New Forest
- Shire county: Hampshire
- Region: South East
- Country: England
- Sovereign state: United Kingdom
- Post town: BROCKENHURST
- Postcode district: SO42
- Dialling code: 01590
- Police: Hampshire and Isle of Wight
- Fire: Hampshire and Isle of Wight
- Ambulance: South Central
- UK Parliament: New Forest East

East Boldre is a linear village and civil parish situated near Lymington, Hampshire, England. East Boldre is surrounded by the New Forest and forms part of the district of New Forest.

The Anglican parish church is dedicated to St. Paul, and there is a baptist chapel which was founded in 1810. There is a traditional local pub, The Turfcutters Arms, and a post office. The parish includes the adjoining hamlet of East End.

== History ==
People have lived in the East Boldre area since prehistoric times. Over thirty Bronze Age barrows lie within the parish boundaries.

The village of East Boldre was originally a straggling hamlet and was known as Beaulieu Rails. This earlier name reflected the fact that the settlement had grown up along the wooden railings defining the western boundary of the manor and parish of Beaulieu. The residents were described in a parliamentary report in 1834 as "for the most part smugglers and deer-stealers."

The first church was a Baptist church founded in 1810. The Anglican church of St. Paul was built in 1839 but was restored and the chancel added in 1891. The ecclesiastical parish of East Boldre was formed in 1840. There were 650 inhabitants in 1871. The village hall was built in 1917. In 1929 East Boldre Civil Parish was created from the Parish of Boldre.

An airfield was built in East Boldre in 1910. There was a flying school there for two years before the airfield reverted to grazing land. In 1914, one of the sheds on the airfield was taken over by the Royal Flying Corps, and by 1915, the demand for pilots for World War I resulted in a training school called RFC Beaulieu being built. On 24 October 1917, the village post office at East Boldre was accidentally damaged by a British aeroplane, and for six months, the elderly inhabitants had to live under tarpaulins in the house even whilst transacting postal business. The camp was closed in 1919. The airfield identification letters, BEAULIEU, have been restored and are still visible at this location 50°48'25.9"N 1°28'52.7"W

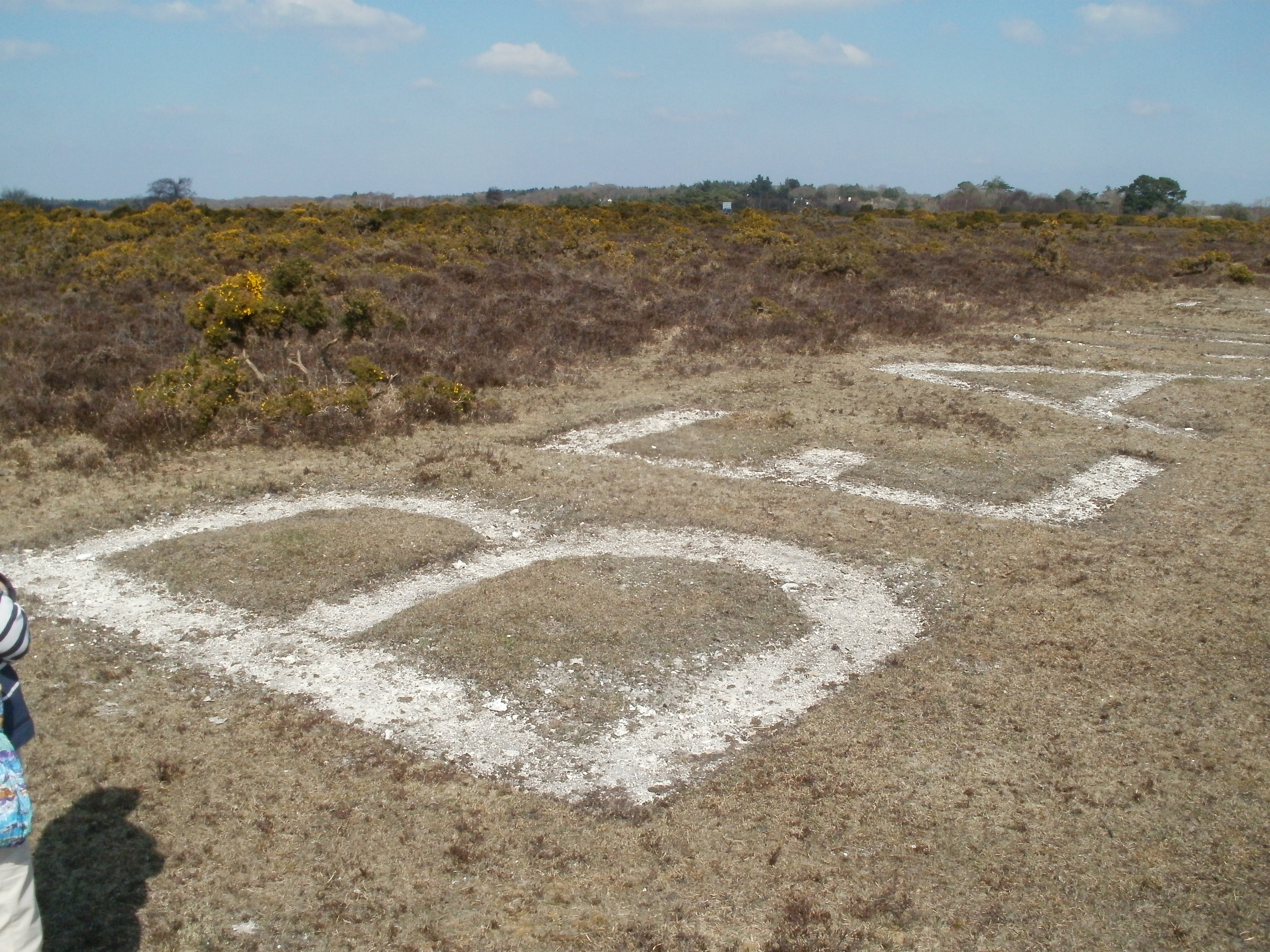
RFC Beaulieu identification letters.

In 1942, during World War II, a three-runway airfield, RAF Beaulieu, was built on the opposite side of the road. It was used by both the Royal Air Force and then later by the United States Army Air Forces. After the war, the Airborne Forces Experimental Establishment (AFEE) came to RAF Beaulieu and used the former airfield as a parachute dropping zone until September 1950. The site was then neglected, and the Air Ministry relinquished control of the land in 1959. Today, model aircraft are flown on the site.

The film director Ken Russell and his fourth wife Elize lived in a thatched cottage in East Boldre. On 3 April 2006, the cottage burned down, destroying most of their possessions, including much of Russell's movie-making equipment. They afterwards moved to nearby Lymington.
