= Bonny Portmore =

Irish traditional folk song

"Bonny Portmore" is an Irish traditional folk song which laments the demise of Ireland's old oak forests, specifically the Great Oak of Portmore or the Portmore Ornament Tree, which fell in a windstorm in 1760 and was subsequently used for shipbuilding and other purposes.

== Background ==
In 1664 an extensive castle was erected at Portmore, near Portmore Lough, County Antrim by Lord Conway, on the site of a more ancient fortress. It contained accommodation for two troops of horse. The site fell into neglect after Conway's death in 1683, and the buildings were removed around 1760. The old oak is believed to have stood on the estate of Portmore Castle.

The melody of this song was first published 1840 in Edward Bunting's Ancient Music of Ireland and was collected from the playing of Ulster harper Daniel Black in 1796. The tune is also known as "Margaret Lavin". The air is probably as old as the time of the O'Neills of Ballinderry, who, due to declining fortunes were forced to sell the property to Lord Conway. The first verse appears to make reference to this sale.

A Scottish version laments the loss of a lover left behind at Portmore, which William Tait identifies with (St. Fillans). (There is also a Portmore Loch in the Scottish Borders). While attributed to Donald Cameron, Burns biographer Alan Cunningham believes it comes from the north of Ireland. Peter Buchan published a version which formed the basis of Burns' "My Heart's in the Highlands".

Canadian singer/songwriter Loreena McKennitt recorded a version of the song on her 1991 album The Visit.

== Lyrics ==
As with most folk songs, there are many variations. This is one version. The first verse can be used as a refrain, or repeated at the end.

O bonny Portmore, I am sorry to see
Such a woeful destruction of your ornament tree
For it stood on your shore for many's the long day
Till the long boats from Antrim came to float it away.

O bonny Portmore, you shine where you stand
And the more I think on you the more I think long
If I had you now as I had once before
All the lords in Old England would not purchase Portmore.

All the birds in the forest they bitterly weep
Saying, "Where shall we shelter or where shall we sleep?"
For the Oak and the Ash, they are all cutten down
And the walls of bonny Portmore are all down to the ground.
