= Battramsley =

Hamlet in Hampshire, England

Coordinates: 50°47′13″N 1°33′43″W

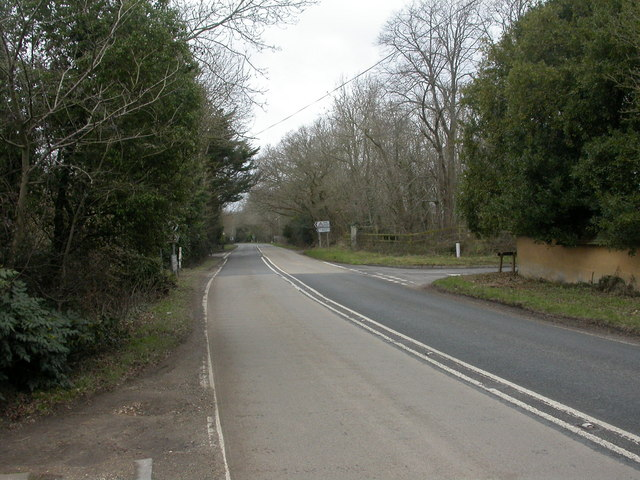
- A337 road at Battramsley Cross

- Location within Hampshire
- OS grid reference: SZ3099
- District: New Forest
- Shire county: Hampshire
- Region: South East
- Country: England
- Sovereign state: United Kingdom
- Post town: LYMINGTON
- Postcode district: SO42
- Dialling code: 01590
- Police: Hampshire and Isle of Wight
- Fire: Hampshire and Isle of Wight
- Ambulance: South Central

Battramsley is a hamlet in the civil parish of Boldre, in the New Forest in Hampshire, England.

== Overview ==
Battramsley is a hamlet located just west of the village of Boldre, on the A337 road between Brockenhurst and Lymington. There is one pub called The Hobler Inn.

== History ==
Battramsley is listed in the Domesday Book of 1086. It had previously been held jointly by Saulf and Alfric. This land was taken into the forest with the exception of 4 acres which Saulf was allowed to retain. Battramsley is again mentioned in 1296 when mention is made of land held by Alice Foucher, from whom it passed to her daughter Margery before 1325.

Record is found of small estates in Battramsley held by various families in the following centuries, but in 1542 the manor of Battramsley was sold to John Mill, purchaser and grantee of other estates in the parish. It remained in this family until the death of Richard Mill without issue in 1613. His wife Mary, who survived him, then married Thomas Wroughton, and they jointly conveyed the manor in 1622 to George Wroughton, probably brother or son.

In 1765 the site of the manor was in the possession of William Buckler. It passed in 1779 to Sir Andrew Hamond, captain in the Royal Navy, who was created a baronet in 1783 for his services in the American War of Independence. The Reverend Charles Kingsley, father of Charles Kingsley, the author, lived at Battramsley House.

A mill in Battramsley is mentioned in 1296, in 1324, and again in 1348, probably the water-mill which passed with the manor to John Mill in 1542, but no later record of it is found.
