= John Stratford (verderer) =

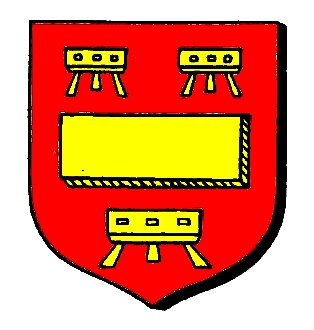
- Coats of Arms of John Stratford
- Born: 1380; England
- Died: 1433; England
- Other names: John Stratforde
- Known for: Stratford Lyon

John Stratford (1380 – July 1433), also known as John Stratforde, was a medieval English verderer and landowner.

John was born into the landed Wessex Stratford Family of Hampshire and Wiltshire, son of Robert Stratford, grandson of Andrew de Stratford. As his father died when he was still in infancy, John was raised as a ward of the King. On reaching 21 John inherited much of his late father's and grandfather's estates in Hampshire and Wiltshire, including a meadow called 'Haresmede' in South Baddesley in the New Forest, and land in Alderstone, Farnham, Chute, Whelpley, Cowesfield, and Winterbourne. He regularly sat as a juror in Inquisitions Post Mortem, and acted as Verderer in the forests of Chute and Milchet in Wiltshire until his death in July 1433.

== Folklore ==
According to local folklore, the village pub in Boldre, the Red Lion, is named after the Stratford Lyon. Supposedly a giant red lion with a wild mane, yellow eyes, large teeth, and huge stag-like antlers, pulled from the ground by John Stratford in his land of Haresmede in the late 14th or early 15th century. There have been recorded sightings of the monster as early as the 18th century, and as recently as the 20th century.
