= Pilley, Hampshire =

Village in Hampshire, England

Coordinates: 50.78244°N 1.53186°W

Pilley
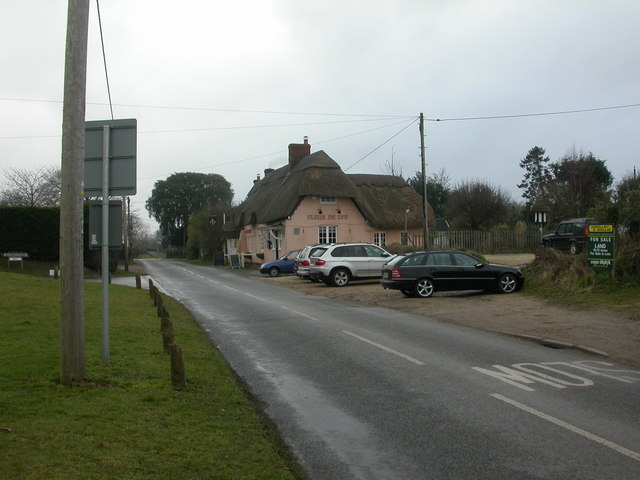
- Pilley, looking towards the Fleur De Lys inn

- Location within Hampshire
- OS grid reference: SZ331982
- District: New Forest
- Shire county: Hampshire
- Region: South East
- Country: England
- Sovereign state: United Kingdom
- Post town: LYMINGTON
- Postcode district: SO42
- Dialling code: 01590
- Police: Hampshire and Isle of Wight
- Fire: Hampshire and Isle of Wight
- Ambulance: South Central
- UK Parliament: New Forest East

Pilley is a small village in the civil parish of Boldre, in the New Forest national park in Hampshire, England. Pilley is located 2 miles north of the port of Lymington.

== Overview ==
Pilley is a village located just east of the village of Boldre, in Hampshire. At the west end of the village is as Pilley Hill and at the east end is Bull Hill. The northern part of the village is known as Pilley Bailey. Pilley is home to Boldre War Memorial Hall, and an Anglican chapel dedicated to Saint Nicholas. The village also has a primary school (named after William Gilpin), and a pre-school.

The village has one inn called the Fleur de Lys. The inn claims to be the oldest in the New Forest, and to have been serving drinks since 1096. A list of landlords going back to 1498 is viewable by the entrance.

== History ==
Pilley is listed three times in the Domesday Book of 1086. Before 1066 the lands had been held by Edric, Alfric Small, and Algar. By 1086, much of the land had been taken into the New Forest with the exception of some land held by Alfric Small and Hugh de Quintin. By 1316 the Pilley family were established here, as Roger de Pilley appears as joint owner with John de Wereburn of the vill of Pilley. During the 15th century record is found of small estates held by various families, and in 1505 the manor was in the possession of Roger Filey, who left as heir a niece Joan, aged nine years. In 1547 John Filey sold the manor to John Mill. It remained in the Mill family into the 17th century, but it then passed through various hands until the late 18th century. Current manorial rights are with and passed down through the Harrison family of Hythe.

== Bull Hill ==
Bull Hill is a small hamlet situated on the south-east side of Pilley.
