= Boldre =

Village and parish in Hampshire, England

Coordinates: 50.7821°N 1.5533°W

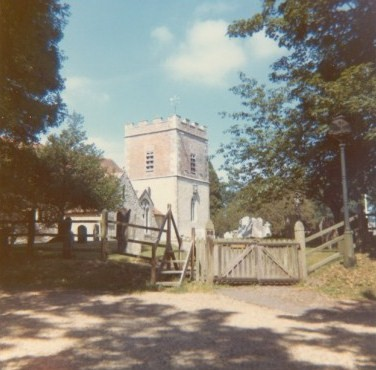
- Boldre in the New Forest

- Location within Hampshire
- Population: 2,003 (2011 Census including Pilley, South Baddesley and Walhampton)
- OS grid reference: SZ315981
- Civil parish: Boldre
- District: New Forest
- Shire county: Hampshire
- Region: South East
- Country: England
- Sovereign state: United Kingdom
- Post town: LYMINGTON
- Postcode district: SO41
- Dialling code: 01590
- Police: Hampshire and Isle of Wight
- Fire: Hampshire and Isle of Wight
- Ambulance: South Central
- UK Parliament: New Forest East

Boldre is a village and civil parish in the New Forest district of Hampshire, England. It is in the south of the New Forest National Park, above the broadening (estuary) of the Lymington River, two miles (3 km) north of Lymington. In the 2001 census, the parish had a population of 1,931, and in the 2011 census, 2,003. The parish has a few campsites and a tourist caravan site, along with visitor parking around its mixed woodland and heath hamlet of Norley Wood.

== Description ==
The parish covers 7,718 acres (31.23 km^{2}) and include the hamlets of Battramsley, Sandy Down, Pilley, Bull Hill, Norley Wood, Portmore, South Baddesley, and Walhampton. It has a church, St. John the Baptist, a Boldre Club, one of the oldest surviving in the forest, a pub-restaurant (the Red Lion), the Church of England-ethos William Gilpin School on Pilley Hill, named after a local Vicar. The old school house in Boldre Lane has a plaque outside and houses a post office.

One hundred years ago, W. H. Hudson, in Hampshire Days, called the countryside north of Lymington, round the villages of Pilley and Boldre, "a land of secret, green, out-of-the-world places." Today, it contains large homes and is more accessible.

== History ==
=== Early and mediaeval ===
The Domesday Book of 1086 contains a substantial entry on the Hundred of Boldre, where it is recorded as "Bouvre". The church replaced an earlier one from the 13th century and a huge iron key which was used by the monks from Beaulieu Abbey is still used to unlock the doors.

=== Gilpin and the picturesque ===
Former residents include William Gilpin, who was the village parson and lived at Vicars Hill. He was famed for his wealth of knowledge about the New Forest, and its flora and fauna. He died in 1804 at the age of 80. He is buried in the churchyard of St. John the Baptist beside an old maple tree, which is inscribed:

In a quiet mansion beneath this stone, secured from the afflictions and still more dangerous enjoyments of life, lie the remains of William Gilpin, sometime vicar of this parish, together with the remains of Margaret his wife....who "await patiently the joy of waking in a much happier place"...Here it will be a new joy to meet several of their good neighbours who now lie scattered in these sacred precincts around them.

=== Comyn's New Forest ===
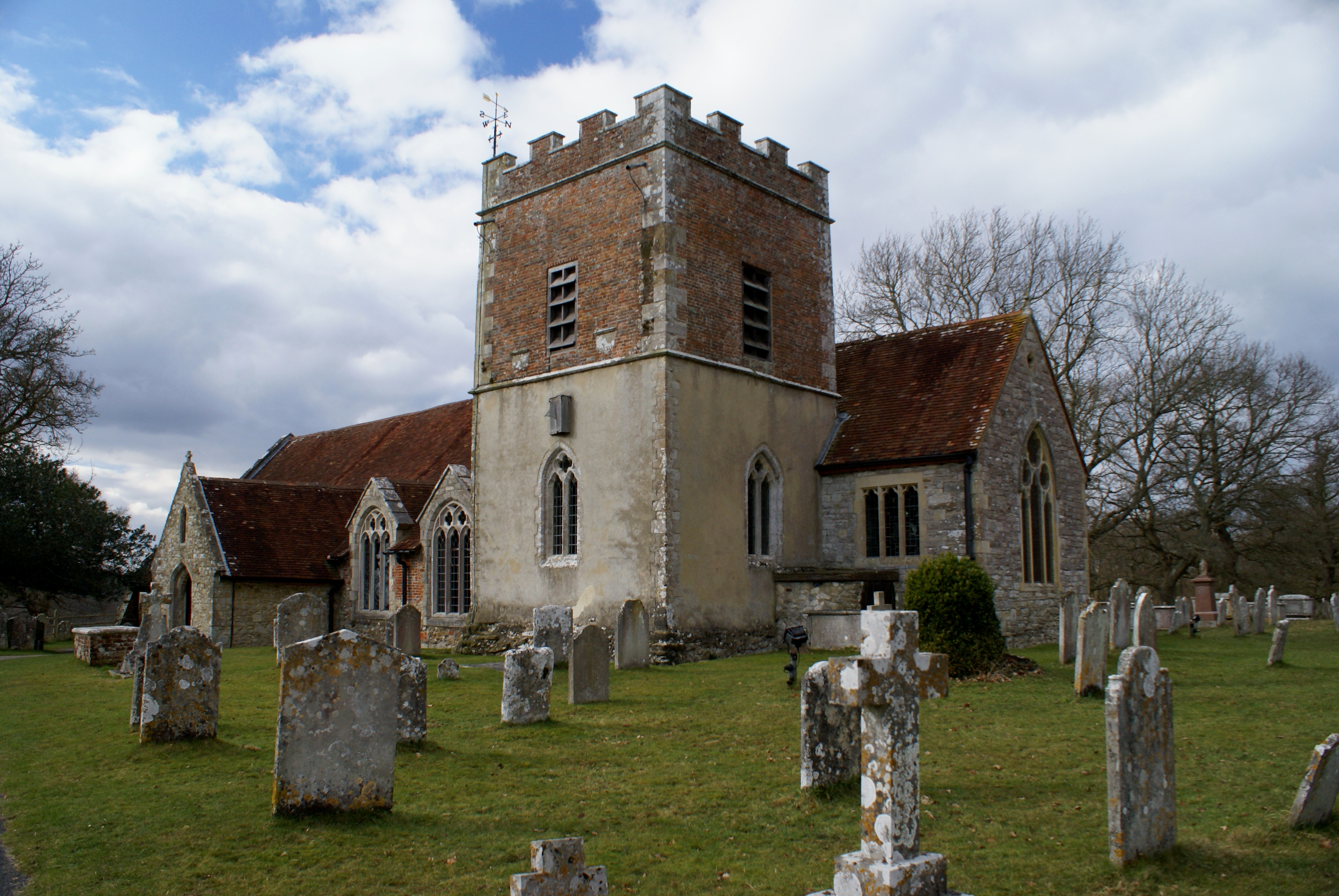
St John the Baptist Church, Boldre

Later, the Rev. Thomas Vialls, was quite absent, but made one of his rare appearances in the parish to conduct the wedding of his curate Henry Comyn and Philadelphia Heylyn in 1815. Comyn, brother of Lord Nelson's chaplain Stephen George Comyn, carried out a comprehensive census and register of the parish in 1817 (which then included Sway), and compiled the notebooks of Boldre. He sought to track the growth of religious dissent of parishioners, especially in a region of considerable conversion to Baptism, reflected in careful recording of Dissenters in his notebooks. The Baptist church at Beaulieu Rails (East Boldre) was founded in 1810 and at Sway in the west of the parish in 1816. He probably saw the Independents and Methodists as waywards Christians but less attractive. The records have been of use to genealogy and socio-religious history.

He also published a book entitled Substance of part of the lectures delivered in the United parishes of Boldre and Brockenhurst, which was printed and published by Galpine of Lymington. The British Library copy contains many amendments in Comyn's own hand and there is also a copy in the University of Southampton Library, Cope Collection.

=== Caroline Southey ===
Another who linked the village with literature was Caroline Bowles, who in 1839 married the Poet Laureate Robert Southey.

=== Hood Association ===
The Church commemorates HMS Hood because Hood's final Admiral Lancelot Holland was a regular worshipper at the church before World War II. The Hood Association attended and promoted an Annual Boldre Service, no longer widely promulgated, but the largest public service of remembrance for the Hood, generally the week before their reunion dinner and service of remembrance always on the Saturday nearest to 24 May.

=== Priest in Prison ===
After World War II, notable vicar John Hayter served the parish, who had spent much of the war as a padre in the ill-treated, malnourished Changi Prison during the Japanese occupation of Singapore. He wrote of his experiences.

== Folklore ==
The local pub, the Red Lion, dates from the 17th century and is named after a creature of local folklore, the Stratford Lyon. Supposedly it was a giant red lion with a wild mane, yellow eyes, large teeth, and huge stag-like antlers, pulled from the ground by verderer John Stratford in a nearby wood named Haresmede in the early 15th century. There have been recorded sightings of the monster as recently as the 20th century.
