= Everton, Hampshire =

Village and parish in Hampshire, England

Coordinates: 50°44′45″N 1°35′35″W

Everton
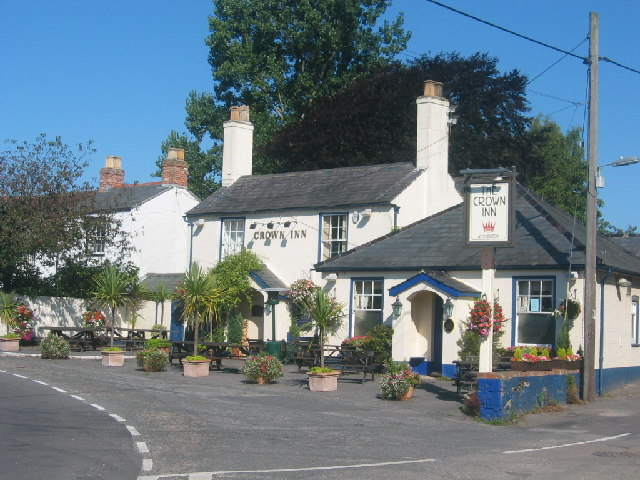
- Crown Inn, Everton

- Location within Hampshire
- OS grid reference: SZ288941
- Civil parish: Hordle
- District: New Forest
- Shire county: Hampshire
- Region: South East
- Country: England
- Sovereign state: United Kingdom
- Post town: LYMINGTON
- Postcode district: SO41
- Dialling code: 01590
- Police: Hampshire and Isle of Wight
- Fire: Hampshire and Isle of Wight
- Ambulance: South Central
- UK Parliament: New Forest West

Everton is a village in the civil parish of Hordle, 2 1/2 miles (4.0 km) west of Lymington, in the English county of Hampshire.

== Overview ==
Everton is at the junction of the A337 and B3058 roads. It is in the southeast of the parish of Hordle. The village has around 760 houses, the majority having been built since 1970. It also has a village shop, a social club, a garden centre, and a large nursery. It has a church dedicated to Saint Mary which is a daughter church of All Saints, Milford on Sea. The village has one pub called The Crown.

== History ==
The earliest deeds which mention Everton (c. 1300) spell the name as Yveletona. The name may be equivalent to that of Yeovilton in Somerset, and made up of two elements: "Gifl" - a Brittonic river name, and "ton" - an Anglo-Saxon word for a farm. Subsequent variants of the name include Yelverton, Yeovilton, Evilton, and Evelton.

From the time of Charles II down to the beginning of the 19th century, Everton was home to three notable Catholic families, succeeding each other at Everton House - Steptoe, White, and Lacy. The first Anglican church was erected in 1896 and was constructed mainly from wood and corrugated iron. This was replaced in 1970 with the present timber-framed and cedar shingle clad church.

Everton saw some action during World War II. On 15 October 1940 at 12:45 pm, a Messerschmitt Bf 109E-1 was shot down at Everton. Less than a year later, at nearby Efford, on 8 July 1941 at 1:25 am, a Heinkel He 111H-3 was shot down by a Bristol Beaufighter, four crew members were killed, but one member of the crew baled out and was captured by members of the local home guard.
