= Andrew Thomas Turton Peterson =

British barrister

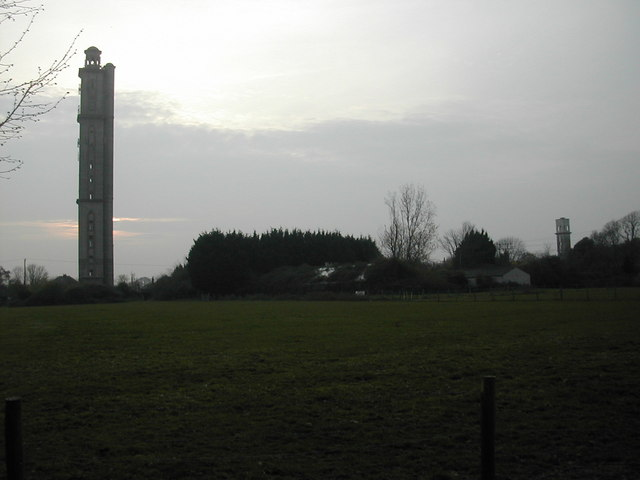
Sway tower, completed in 1886

Andrew Thomas Turton Peterson (1813–1906) was an Anglo-Indian barrister, spiritualist, socialist and amateur architect.

After three years at school, Peterson ran away to sea, working at a salt works in India. Returning to England, he trained as a lawyer and married Charlotte Myers St Clair, daughter of a colonel in the Royal Artillery. In 1846 he left to practice law at the Supreme Court in Calcutta. Retiring in the 1870s, he bought land near Sway, Hampshire, building and extending his house, Arnewood Towers, "from a small villa into a commodious country residence of somewhere near forty rooms, with the necessary outbuildings, built entirely of concrete".

Becoming a convert to spiritualism, Peterson met an uneducated sensitive called William Lawrence. After Lawrence had completed a three-month sentence for fraudulent imposture at Coldbath Fields prison, he became Peterson's personal medium, channelling spirit messages from 'controls' including Pythagoras, Aesop, Aristophanes, Plato, Aristotle, Brutus, Julius Caesar, Buddha, Muhammad, Jesus, Martin Luther, John Knox, Oliver Cromwell, Sir Walter Raleigh, William Shakespeare, Alexander Pope, John Dryden, Jonathan Swift and Thomas Paine. In late 1877 Lawrence also served as the channel for 'Spiritual drawings' from William Blake and Henry Fuseli.

Sir Christopher Wren, through Lawrence, directed Peterson to build a large concrete tower in Sway: foundation work began in 1879, and in 1886 the tower was completed, at a height of 218 feet (66 meters) and a cost of £30,000. It remains the world's tallest non-reinforced concrete structure.

== Works ==
- Essays from the Unseen, delivered through the mouth of W. L., a sensitive, and recorded by A T. T. P., 1885
