= Geoffrey Marsh (museum director) =

Geoffrey David Marsh (born 16 August 1957, in Nottingham, United Kingdom) is an English museum professional who runs the Theatre and Performing Arts department of the Victoria and Albert Museum.

He started his career at the Museum of London and was Project Director for the Imperial War Museum North in Manchester from 1993 to 1999. Previously, he ran the London office of AEA Consulting and has often worked as a consultant for the planning of cultural developments including projects in Australia, Canada, Italy, Belgium and Iraq. He is best known for his exhibitions and has been co-curator for Diaghilev and the Golden Age of the Ballets Russes 1909–1929 (2010), The Story of the Supremes from the Mary Wilson Collection (2008) and You Say You Want A Revolution? Records and Rebels 1966–70 (2017) at the Victoria and Albert Museum. More recently, he has gained much media attention for his David Bowie Is exhibition which he also co-curated. A film of the exhibition, David Bowie is Happening Now, directed by Hamish Hamilton, was released in the UK on 13 August 2013.

His book, Living with Shakespeare, was published in 2021 and examines the actor/playwright/poet's life in the 1590s, when he was living in the parish of St Helen's Bishopsgate. It sheds new light on the influences which may have shaped a great writer as he finished Romeo and Juliet, A Midsummer Night's Dream and The Merchant of Venice while re-establishing his family name, status and reputation.
