= South Baddesley =

Village and parish in Hampshire, England

Coordinates: 50.767661°N 1.50356°W

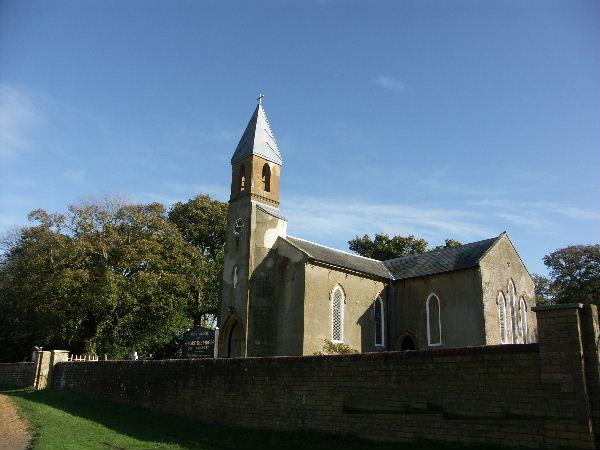
- St. Mary's Church, South Baddesley

- Location within Hampshire
- OS grid reference: SZ3510696570
- District: New Forest
- Shire county: Hampshire
- Region: South East
- Country: England
- Sovereign state: United Kingdom
- Post town: LYMINGTON
- Postcode district: SO41
- Dialling code: 01590
- Police: Hampshire and Isle of Wight
- Fire: Hampshire and Isle of Wight
- Ambulance: South Central
- UK Parliament: New Forest West

South Baddesley is a small village in the civil parish of Boldre in the New Forest National Park of Hampshire, England. It lies 2.3 miles (3.7 km) north-east from Lymington, its nearest town.

== The Groaning Tree of Baddesley ==
In his Remarks on Forest Scenery, published in 1791, local author William Gilpin relates the history of "the groaning-tree of Badesly". He explains how around the year 1750 a local villager in South Baddesley frequently heard a sound like a "person in extreme agony" behind his house. He eventually discovered that the noise emanated from an elm tree. Within a few weeks the fame of the tree was such that people came from far and wide to listen to the tree, including Frederick, Prince of Wales and Princess Augusta. Many explanations were offered, both natural and supernatural for the phenomenon, but no adequate explanation could be found. The groaning continued, intermittently, for "eighteen or twenty months", until the owner decided to bore a hole in the trunk in an attempt to discover the cause. The tree never groaned again, and eventually the tree was deliberately uprooted, but nothing unusual was found.

== The Stratford Lyon ==
Tradition holds that the pub in nearby Boldre, the Red Lion, is named after a creature of local folklore, the Stratford Lyon. Supposedly a giant red lion with a wild mane, yellow eyes, large teeth, and huge stag-like antlers, pulled from the ground by John Stratford (verderer) in a wood in South Baddesley named Haresmede in the late 14th or early 15th century. There have been recorded sightings of the monster as early as the 18th century, and as recently as the 20th century.

== See also ==
- North Baddesley
