= Sway, Hampshire =

Village and parish in Hampshire, England

Coordinates: 50°46′59″N 1°36′00″W

Sway
- Village and civil parish
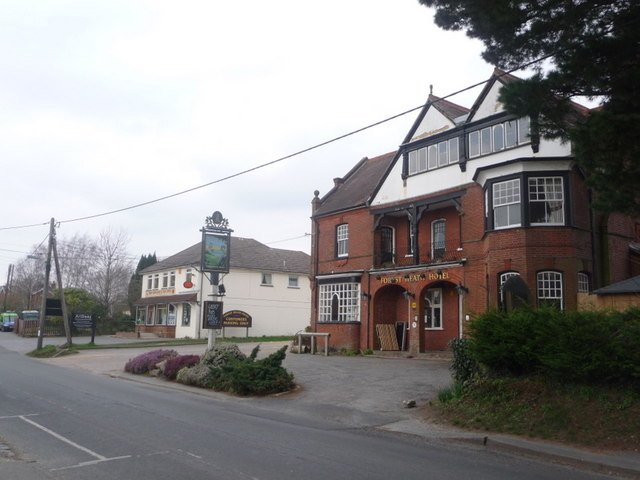
- Sway: Forest Heath Hotel and the post office

- Location within Hampshire
- Population: 3,448 (2001 and 2011 Census')
- OS grid reference: SZ2798
- Civil parish: Sway
- District: New Forest
- Shire county: Hampshire
- Region: South East
- Country: England
- Sovereign state: United Kingdom
- Post town: LYMINGTON
- Postcode district: SO41
- Dialling code: 01590
- Police: Hampshire and Isle of Wight
- Fire: Hampshire and Isle of Wight
- Ambulance: South Central
- UK Parliament: New Forest East

Sway is a village and civil parish in Hampshire in the New Forest national park in England. The civil parish was formed in 1879, when lands were taken from the extensive parish of Boldre. The village has shops and pubs, and a railway station on the South West Main Line from Weymouth and Bournemouth to Southampton and London Waterloo. It is the site of Sway Tower, a 66-metre (217 ft) concrete folly built in the 19th century. The outbuildings of the Grade II listed Forest Heath House are used as artist studios and exhibition space by the charity SPUDWorks.

Sway is on the southern edge of the woodland and heathland of the New Forest. Much of Marryat's novel The Children of the New Forest is set in the countryside surrounding Sway.

== Overview ==
Sway has shops, two pubs, a church, a village hall and a number of restaurants and hotels. There is also a Church of England primary school. The village is home to football clubs, a tennis club, Sway Cricket Club, a fencing club, an archery club, a community choir, 'Sing Sway', and a gardening club. Sway railway station is on the South West Main Line from Weymouth and Bournemouth to Southampton and London Waterloo with train services operated by South Western Railway. From Brockenhurst, one can catch the Lymington branch line services which connect with the ferry to Yarmouth on the Isle of Wight. Sway is twinned with the village of Bretteville, France.

The northern part of the parish contains areas of woodland, heathland, acid grassland, scrub and valley bog, supporting a richness and diversity of wildlife.

== History ==
Sway is a settlement of Anglo-Saxon origin, and its name, from the Old English name Svieia, means "noisy stream" which is a probable reference to the Avon Water. Stone Age implements have been found here and Bronze Age barrows containing funerary urns.

Sway is listed four times in the Domesday Book of 1086. Two hides were held from Roger de Montgomerie, 1st Earl of Shrewsbury, by Fulcoin and Nigel respectively. A certain Edmund at the same date was holding one hide in Sway which Algar had held from King Edward. Romsey Abbey also held one hide in Sway.

Some time before 1150 Hugh de Witteville gave "his whole land of Sway with its men and one mill" to Quarr Abbey, and about the same date Ralph Fulcher donated land at Sway to the same abbey. In the 13th century Christchurch Priory also gained land in Sway, which increased in the 14th century by the grant of land in Sway from John, vicar of Christchurch. Free warren in Sway was granted to the priory in 1384. Romsey Abbey also held land in Sway, afterwards known as the manor of Sway Romsey or South Sway. The Abbess of Romsey was holding land in Sway together with the Abbot of Quarr and the Prior of Christchurch in 1316.

In 1543, at the time of the Dissolution of the Monasteries, the lands possessed by Quarr and Christchurch were granted to Sir John Williams and others, by whom it was subsequently conveyed to John Mill, the purchaser and grantee of much monastic property in the neighbourhood. The combined lands became known as the manor of Sway Quarr. The manor of Sway Romsey (South Sway) remained separate but were also granted at the Dissolution to Sir John Williams and henceforth had the same owners as Sway Quarr. The estate then followed the descent of Battramsley manor until 1627, when it was sold by George Wroughton to John Button of Buckland Lymington, and in 1670 he or his son appeared before the justice seat held at Lyndhurst as the lord of the manor of Sway. Before the end of the 17th century, however, it had passed to Edmund Dummer of Swaythling. It then passed by inheritance into the Bond family who held the estate down to the 19th century.

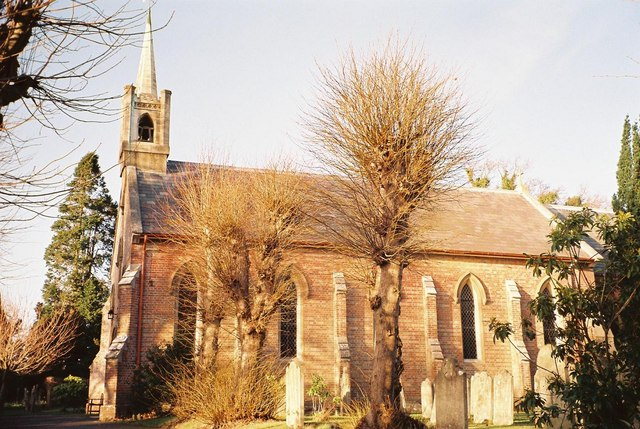
St Luke's Church

One other Domesday Book manor within the parish of Sway is known as Arnewood, which before 1066 had been held by Siward from Earl Tostig. The estate seems to have belong to Christchurch Manor in the 13th and 14th centuries, although one small part of it was held differently and later became joined to the nearby manor of Ashley to become "Ashley Arnewood". In 1384 the Earl of Salisbury and lord of Christchurch sold the manor of Arnewood to Thomas Street. The manor passed through various hands in the following centuries, but by the 19th century it belonged, like the other manors of Sway, to the Bond family.

St Luke's Church was built in 1839. The ecclesiastical parish of Sway was created in 1841. The civil parish of Sway was formed in 1879, when 2,200 acres (8.9 km^{2}) were taken from the extensive parish of Boldre. The railway came to Sway in 1888, when Sway railway station was built.

In the village was Arnewood House (now destroyed by fire) which was the home of the Children of the New Forest in Captain Marryat's book. Marryat also used the surrounding countryside as the setting for the book.

In World War II, an Emergency Landing Ground for aircraft opened in August 1940, when farmland was levelled and cleared just south of the village. It was used by aircraft based at RAF Christchurch for overnight stays to protect them from German attack at Christchurch. The airstrip was also intended to be a decoy airfield intended to trick the Luftwaffe into bombing it; this happened on several occasions. In October 1941, the site was closed and returned to farmland.

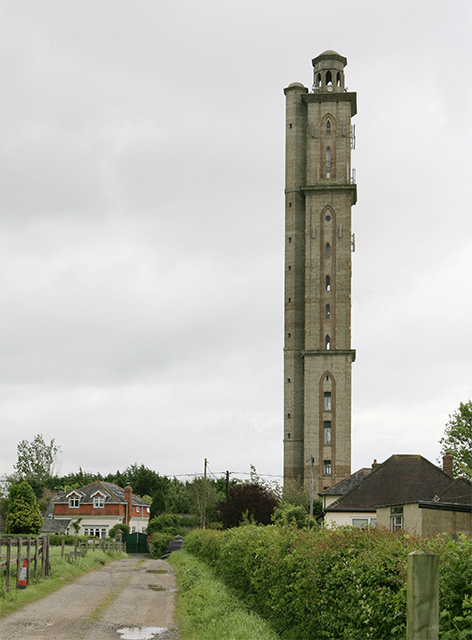
Sway Tower was built by eccentric Yorkshireman Andrew Peterson in 1879

== Sway Tower ==
Sway is perhaps best known for Sway Tower, a folly which stands 66 metres (218 ft) tall at the southern entrance to the village. The building was Grade II* listed in 1975 and is also known as "Peterson's Folly" or "Peterson's Tower".

Built by Andrew Thomas Turton Peterson on his private estate from 1879–1885, both its design and the use of concrete as a building material were influenced by the follies Peterson had seen during his time in India. Peterson—a proponent of spiritualism in his later life—also claimed to be guided by the spirit of Sir Christopher Wren in the building of the tower. It is constructed entirely out of concrete made with Portland cement, with only the windows having iron supports. It was the first major building in Britain to be built entirely from concrete, and it remains the tallest non-reinforced concrete structure in the world.

It was originally designed as a mausoleum, with a perpetual light at the top. However, this was not allowed by Trinity House, as it was thought the light would confuse shipping. It also served to publicise the superiority of Portland cement, even then not fully accepted.

The tower is visible from much of the New Forest, and most of the western Solent. A smaller 15-metre (49 ft) folly, built as a 'prototype', stands in a group of trees to the north of the taller tower. There are many small concrete features (mainly walls) to be found in Milford, Sway and Hordle.

== Forest Heath House and SPUDWorks ==
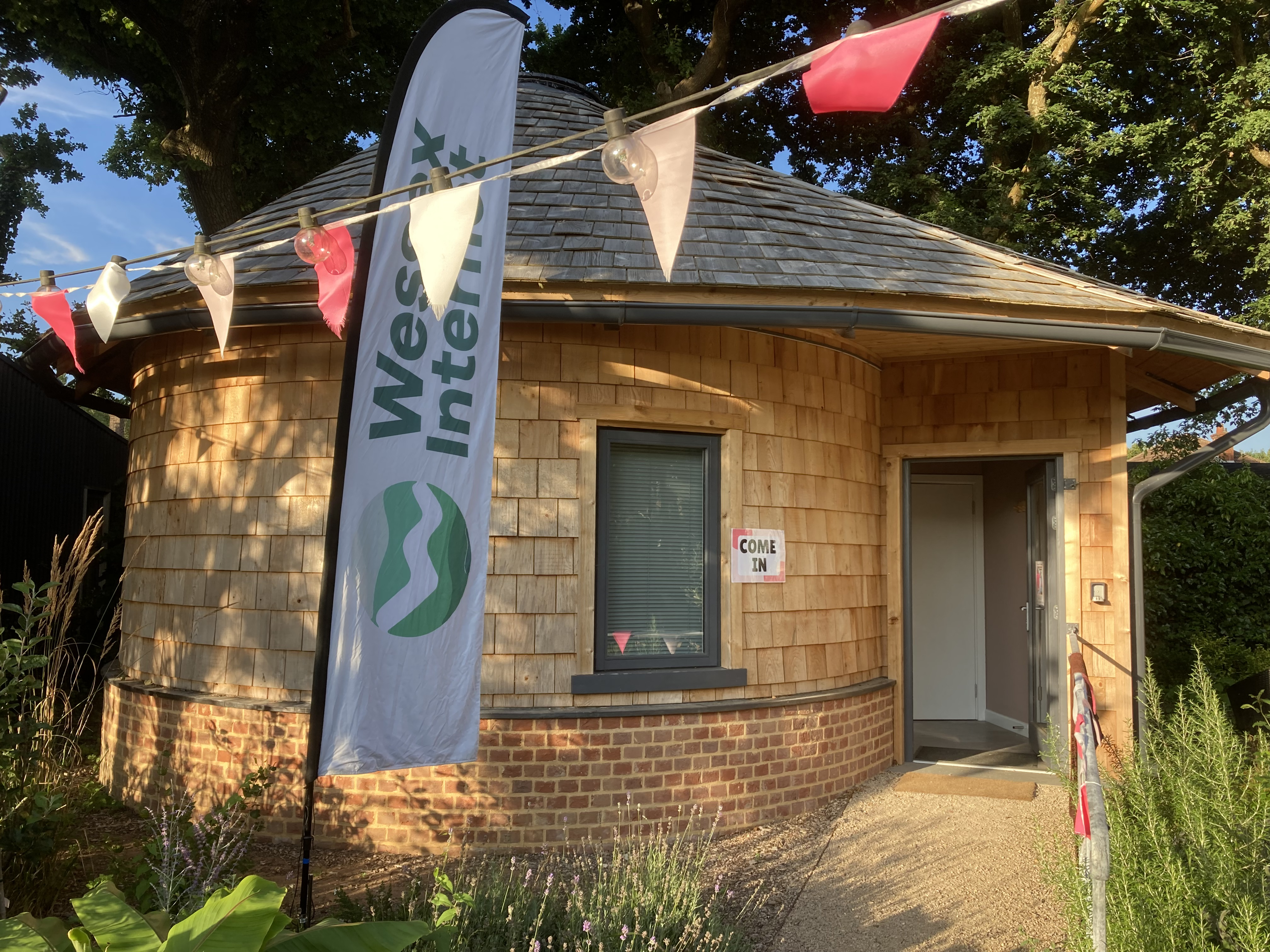
The Living Room at SPUDWorks

Forest Heath House, formerly the Forest Heath Hotel, is a Grade II listed building on Station Road in Sway. The red brick building was constructed as a hotel around 1885, when the railway line to Bournemouth was built. It later operated as a pub, but closed in 2009, was decommissioned, and converted to private apartments.

The outbuildings behind Forest Heath House, as it was renamed, were occupied by ArtSway and later by SPUDworks. SPUD is a registered charity working in the field of art education. They have engaged in a number of art projects throughout the New Forest, such as the Exbury Egg and an anti-litter sculpture. SPUDWorks also built a studio, called The Living Room, in the gardens of Forest Heath House specifically for working with people with dementia. SPUDWorks offers residencies, holds exhibitions and participates in events such as Hampshire Open Studios. One of the artists resident at SPUDWorks is conceptual artist Bob Parks, described as "an interesting artist, a forgotten and peripheral figure from the Los Angeles Performance scene of the 1970s" and "a man who lives art".
