= Bashley =

Bashley may refer to:

- Bashley, Hampshire, a village in Hampshire, England
- Bashley F.C., a football club based at Bashley
- Bashley (Rydal) Cricket Club, a cricket club based at Bashley
