= Milton, Hampshire =

Milton, Hampshire may refer to

- New Milton
- Milton, Portsmouth
