= Ossemsley =

Hamlet in Hampshire, England

Coordinates: 50.7792°N 1.6693°W

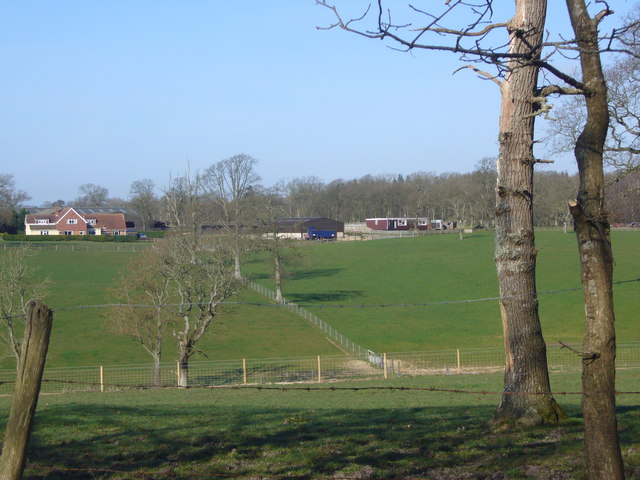
- Ossemsley

- Location within Hampshire
- OS grid reference: SZ234978
- Civil parish: New Milton
- District: New Forest
- Shire county: Hampshire
- Region: South East
- Country: England
- Sovereign state: United Kingdom
- Post town: NEW MILTON
- Postcode district: BH25 5
- Dialling code: 01425
- Police: Hampshire and Isle of Wight
- Fire: Hampshire and Isle of Wight
- Ambulance: South Central
- UK Parliament: New Forest West

Ossemsley is an extended hamlet in the New Forest National Park of Hampshire, England. It lies close to the village of Bashley. The nearest town is New Milton, which lies approximately 1.7 miles (2.4 km) to the south.

== History ==
=== Ossemsley ===
The name Ossemsley probably means "Osmund's wood/clearing". An estate called "Oselei" appears twice in the Domesday Book, but it is listed with places in the Boldre area, so it is thought unlikely to refer to Ossemsley. In 1670 Thomas Stevens is known to have been in possession of "Osmondsley".

=== Ossemsley Manor Estate ===
Ossemsley has never developed into a village, and today it is a scatter of houses in a mix of farmland and woodland. Grade II listed Ossemsley Manor House changed hands a few times during the 19th century before being rebuilt in 1908 for Sir Alfred Cooper. Ossemsley Manor was one of the houses in which Siegfried Sassoon's wife, Lady Hester Gatty, spent her childhood. Sassoon himself is known to have visited Ossemsley Manor in the 1930s. In the lead up to the D-Day invasion of 1944, the battalion of the 2nd Glosters were stationed (in tents) at Ossemsley manor. It is also reported that there was a prisoner-of-war camp at Ossemsley, but its precise location is not certain. In 1982, the manor house was converted into exclusive residential apartments and remains a private residence.
