= New Milton railway station =

Railway station in Hampshire, England

Coordinates: 50.756°N 1.658°W

New Milton
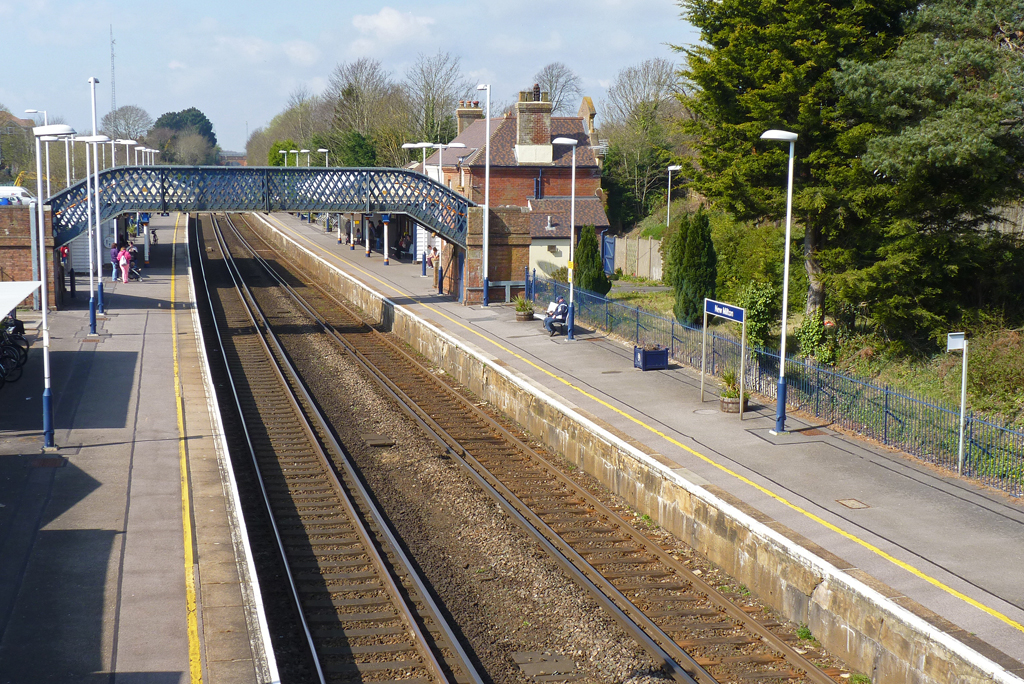
- The two platforms and station building, looking toward Weymouth

General information
- Location: New Milton, District of New Forest; England
- Grid reference: SZ242951
- Managed by: South Western Railway
- Platforms: 2

Other information
- Station code: NWM
- Classification: DfT category C2

History
- Original company: London and South Western Railway
- Pre-grouping: London and South Western Railway
- Post-grouping: Southern Railway

Key dates
- 6 March 1888: Opened

Passengers
- 2020/21: ▼0.162 million
- 2021/22: ▲0.399 million
- 2022/23: ▲0.463 million
- 2023/24: ▲0.518 million
- 2024/25: ▲0.555 million
Location
Notes
- Passenger statistics from the Office of Rail and Road

New Milton railway station serves the market town of New Milton in Hampshire, England. It is 98 miles 44 chains (158.6 km) down the line from London Waterloo station. It also serves nearby places including Milford on Sea, Bashley, Ashley, Hordle and Barton on Sea.

== History ==
The station opened in 1888 as part of the Brockenhurst to Christchurch Branch Railway. It was operated by the London and South Western Railway from 1888 to 1923, by the Southern Railway from 1923 to 1948 and by British Railways from 1948, and from 1982 as part of the Network SouthEast region. From privatisation in 1996 to 2017, all train services were run by South West Trains. Services are now run by South Western Railway.

When it was built there was some discussion on what to call the new station. Milton was suggested, as the closest place, but was discounted as there are a number of places in England with that name. Barton, a short distance away, was also suggested but was decided against for the same reason. It was not until the sub-postmistress set up the sub post office across the road and called it New Milton Sub Post Office that the current name was decided upon.

== Services ==
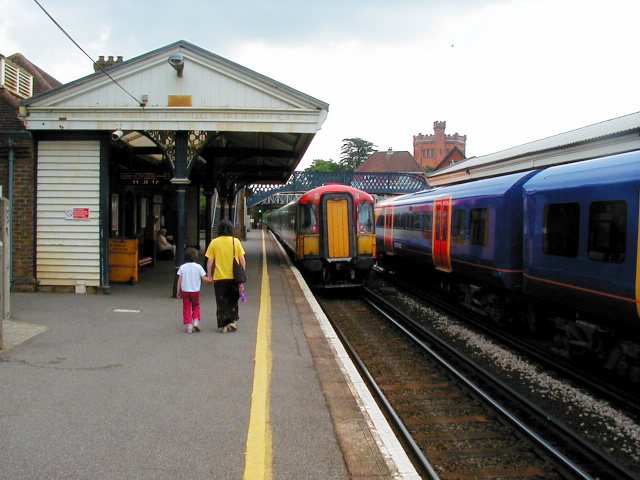
Trains passing at New Milton

The station is able to accommodate trains of up to five coaches (444 or 442 Stock) or six coaches (450 Stock), longer trains only open the doors in the first five or six coaches depending on the type of unit operating the service.

The station is equipped with toilets, a waiting room, bicycle lockers, electronic passenger information screens, a ticket office as well as ticket machines, and has a large pay-and-display car park with 73 spaces for commuters.

All passenger services calling at this station are operated by South Western Railway.

As of February 2022, the following services call here in both directions:

- Monday - Friday
  - 1 train per hour on Weymouth - London Waterloo semi-fast service
  - 1 train per hour on Bournemouth - Winchester stopping service
    - these services are join / split at Southampton Central from the fast Weymouth service giving 2 trains per hour for London in peak hours
- Saturday
  - 1 train per hour on Weymouth - London Waterloo semi-fast service
  - 1 train per hour on Poole - Winchester stopping service
- Sunday
  - 1 train per hour on Weymouth - London Waterloo fast service
  - 1 train per hour on Poole - London Waterloo stopping service

Preceding station	National Rail	Following station
Sway	South Western Railway; London-Weymouth	Hinton Admiral
