= Brockenhurst College =

Coordinates: 50.821°N 1.570°W

- Brockenhurst, Hampshire; United Kingdom

Information
- Other name: 'Brock'
- Type: Further Education
- Motto: inter silvas quarere verum (Latin for "To seek truth amidst the trees")
- Established: 1909
- Principal: Helen Odhams
- Staff: 190 teaching staff
- Enrollment: 2,800 (total; 2006–07); Adult Learning 10,000 (total; 2006–07)
- Campus: Rural
- Website: www.brock.ac.uk

Brockenhurst College is a large tertiary college situated in Brockenhurst, Hampshire. Co-educational since the 1920s, Brockenhurst College accepts students over the age of 16 or year 12 students.

The college has over 2,700 full-time students and over 8,000 part-time adult learners from places such as The New Forest, Bournemouth, Poole, East Dorset, the Waterside area of Southampton, South Wiltshire, Eastleigh, and the Isle of Wight. Brockenhurst College has been an accredited Investors in People since 1996, and in 2004 was awarded by the AoC Beacon Award and is also rated 'Good' by Ofsted.

The types of courses the college provides are professional, vocational and AS/A Level courses, Foundation Degrees and Apprenticeships.

== Campus ==
The College is divided up into A, B, E, M, S and T blocks. In addition to the Main Hall and Foyer, there are also other blocks given full names, such as the Sports Centre, the Hard Brock Café, the Learning Care Centre, and the LRC (Learning Resources Centre).

There is also the Highwood Nursery located between the sports centre and the car park. The college has adult learning centres in Brockenhurst, Lymington and New Milton along with the Hengistbury Head Outdoor Activity Centre and the Marchwood Marine and Construction Centre.

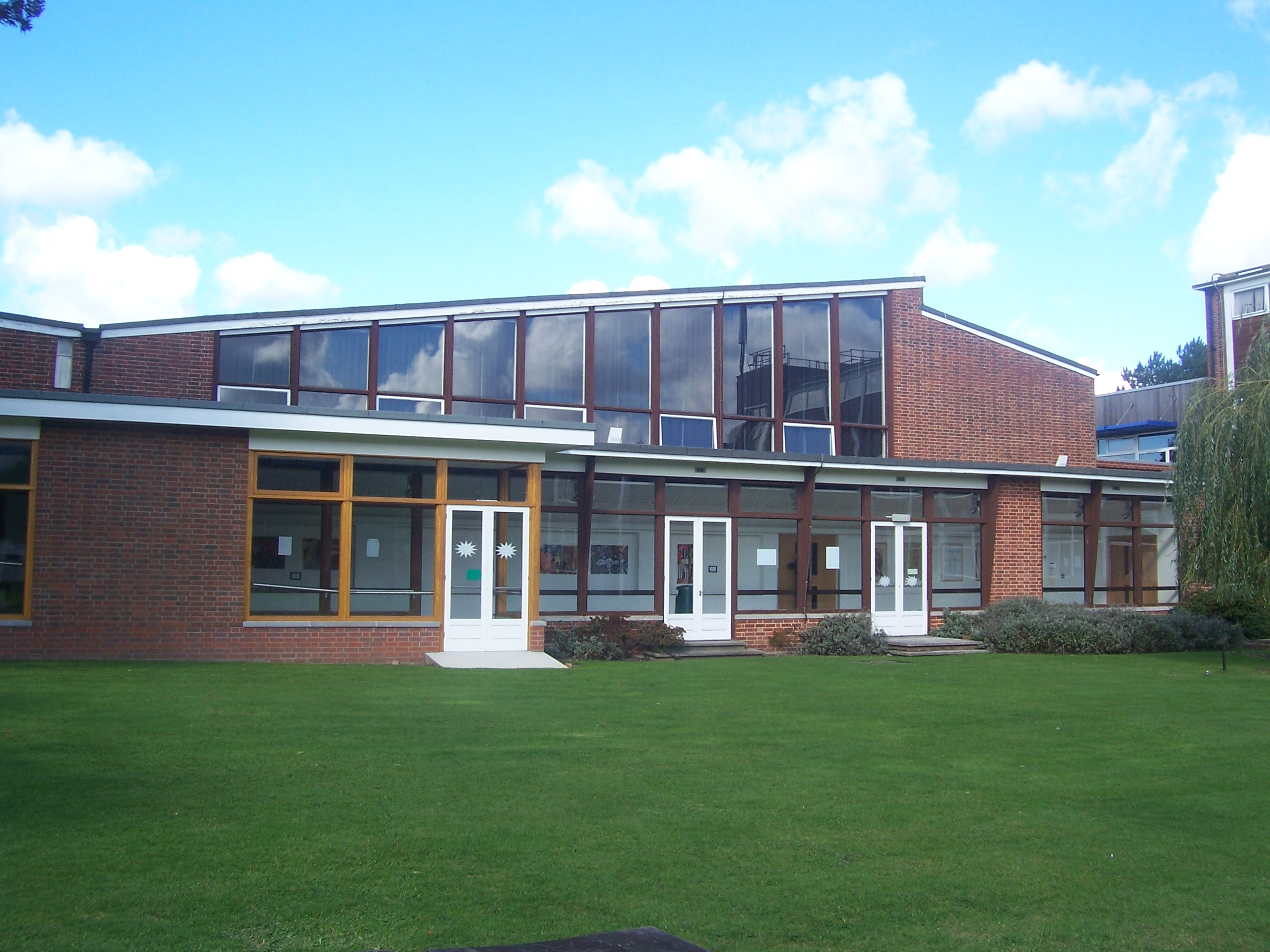
The promenade, with the main hall behind, connecting the M Block with the S Block, A Block and LRC.

M Block

The Main Block is the oldest section of the college which includes the original hall, now called the SEC, used as a secondary room for exams and enrichment programmes. Also within the block, besides the main reception area, are much of the non-teaching staff at Brock as well as the main division offices and the Principal's offices. The offices are also used by Connexions and EMA (Education Maintenance Allowance) attendants located at Student Services. Based also in this block are a team of IT professionals who are in charge of the college network system and maintenance of all college's IT equipment.

Many of the lessons held in this block are Music courses with their own sound rooms and recording studios, Performing Arts and Theatre with their own Performing Arts Centre, Media which also have sound rooms and digital editing suites, Philosophy, Politics, Archeology, History, and Business which has over five computer suits for its study.

A and S Block

A Block contains the Specialist Art Centre, and S is the Sciences Centre complete with three-story building of Biology, Chemistry and Physics laboratories on the ground, first and second floor respectively. Both Chemistry and Biology have student accessible prep rooms frequented by staff. Alongside Physics, a GCSE in Astronomy is also offered. On the bottom floor is the staff room used for morning meetings with the Principal and division heads.

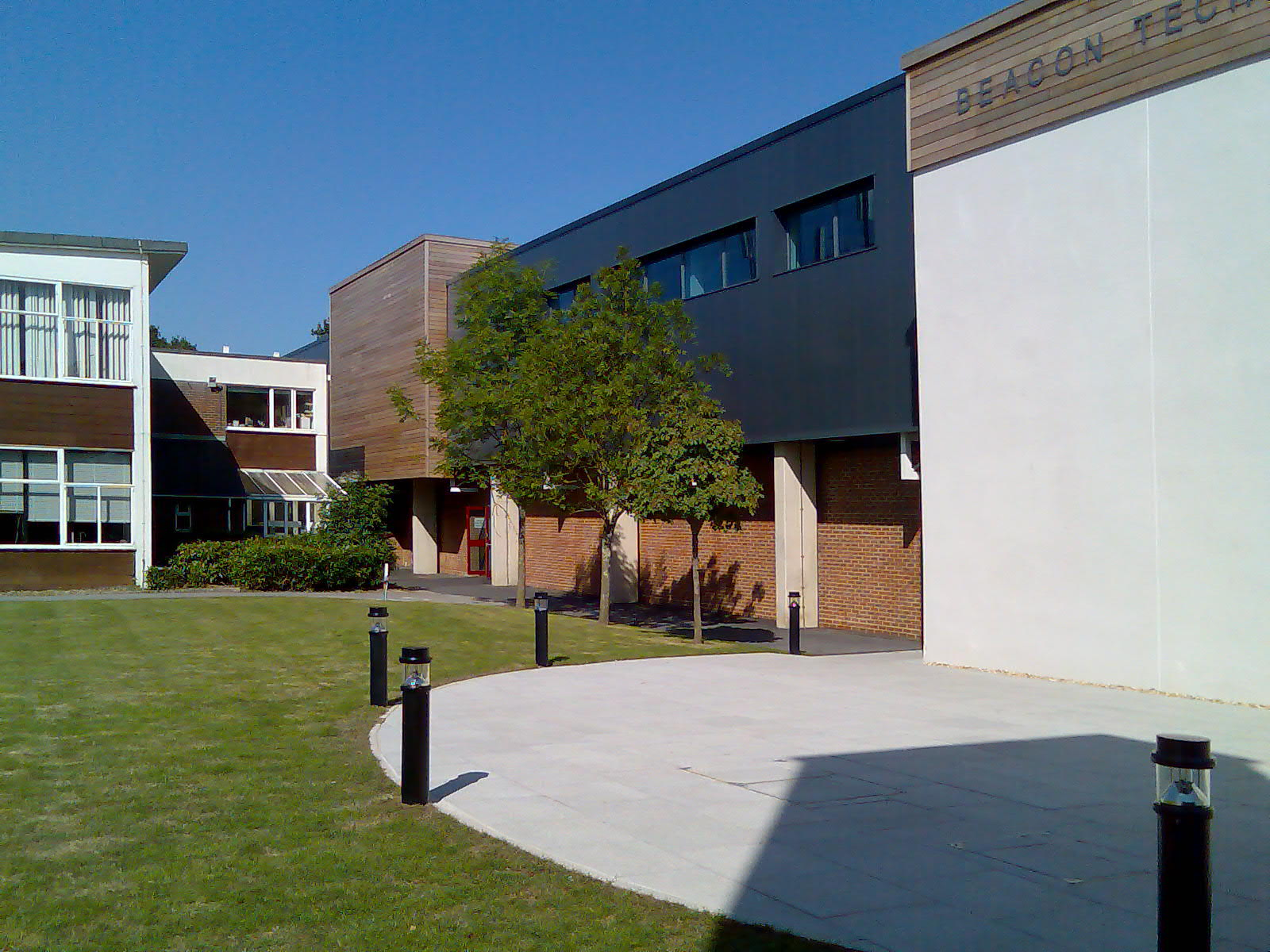
To the right the Beacon Technology Block

B Block

The Beacon Technology Block, named after the college's Beacon Status, contains recording studios, media suites and a photo development lab. All top floor classrooms in the block are fitted with flat screens attached to PCs, and some classrooms are fitted with Apple Mac computers.

On the ground floor of the building are the Training Kitchens and MJ's Restaurant, which is open to the public. Engineering technology facilities and workshops are based in the block, as well as the Graphic Design rooms.

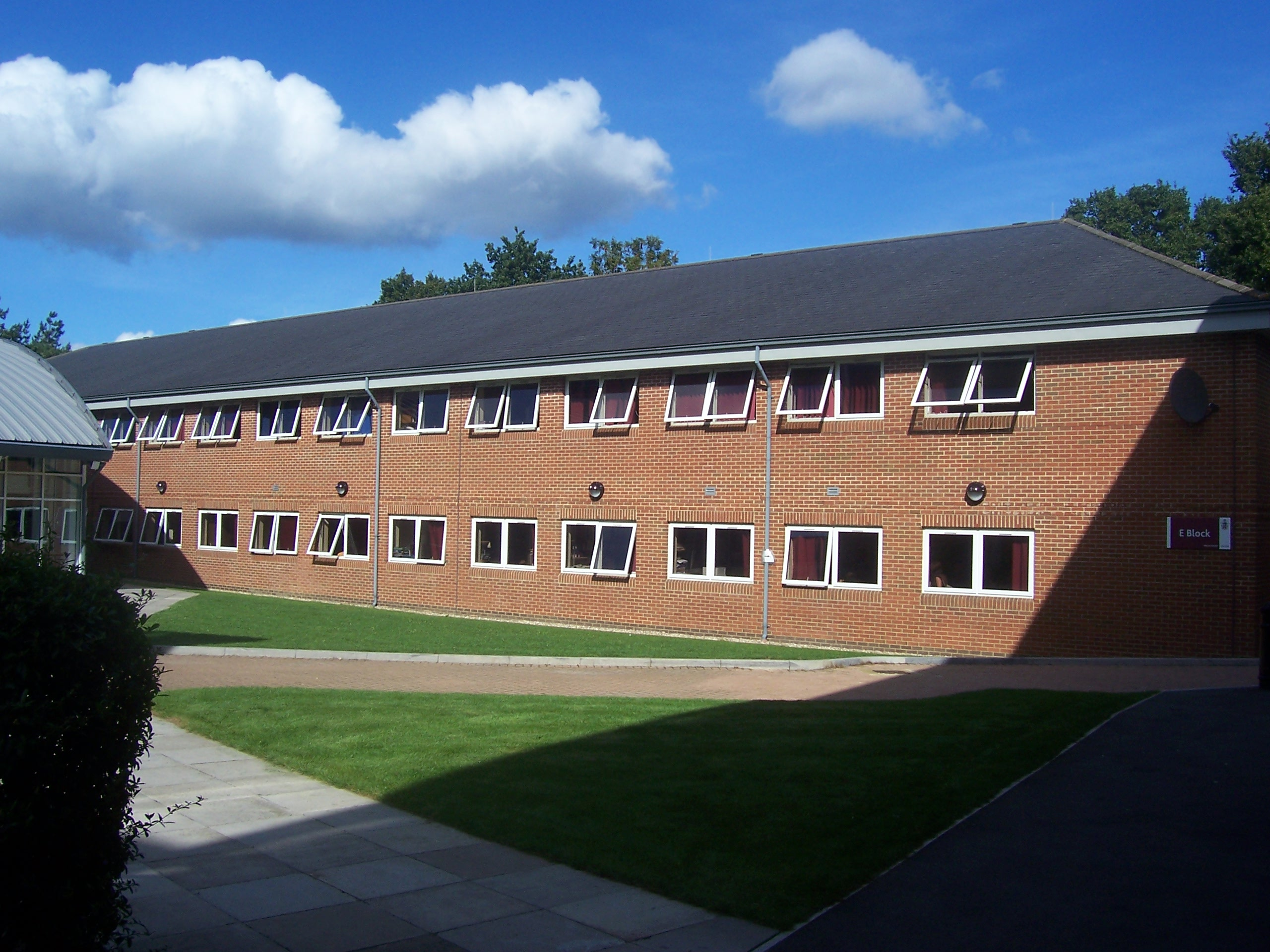
The Errington Block.

E Block

The Errington Block, which was named after an ex-governor of the college, holds additional classrooms for Language, Sociology, Psychology, Business Studies, Early Childhood, Health & Higher Education, Key Skills and GCSE courses. Each room is fitted with digital projectors and computers.

Sports Centre

The sports centre holds all main functions regarding sports, and also contains a Fitness Suite which is opened to the public and college staff during the day and after college hours. The sports centre is also home to the National Volleyball League's New Forest Volleyball Club

The Hard Brock Café

The Hard Brock Café provides hot and cold meals, snacks and drinks. The offices of the Students' Union are located in the interior. Above is a second student-staffed Café serving snacks, a larger range of drinks and pastries, providing working opportunities for students with additional learning requirements.

Brock Hub

Brock Hub, formally known as the Learning Resources Centre (LRC) and colloquially known as 'The Hub', was originally the college main hall and is now the main study area for students at Brock. The Hub has a small library containing course books and course DVDs and CDs, as well as a selection of magazines. On the top floor is an Information Learning Technology Suite containing a silent area with a series of desks designed for independent learning. In this building there is also reprographics and private study rooms.

STEM Centre / T Block

The STEM Centre was constructed from 2015–2016 and replaced most of the portable classrooms which formed H Block. Funding partly came from the M3 Local Enterprise Partnership (LEP). The centre contains computer suites, study and social space, plus the Mathematics department on the first floor.

== Incidents ==
On the 5th of March 2026, officers from Hampshire & Isle of Wight Constabulary were called following reports that a boy at the location of the college had been in possession of a knife. Officers attended the scene and searched the boy with no weapon discovered and no offences confirmed.

== History ==
Pupil teachers' centre 1909–1921

Brockenhurst College began its existence in 1909 as a pupil-teachers' centre – a school where girls from age 13 learned to be teachers. The classes were held in the Wesleyan Church Sunday School, with only 18 children attending under the head mistress, Miss Moore. Although classes were first held in the church Sunday school, Brockenhurst never had any religious affiliation or received any funding from ecclesiastical authorities. It was funded by Hampshire County Council Local Education Authority (LEA), and the Sunday school room was used because it offered suitable accommodation. Between 1913 and 1935 the school moved location twice and changed head mistress to Emma Clara Ward. During this time the school increased further with problems continuing for teaching space.

County school 1921–1939

Taking in both boys and girls, the school was still expanding further with more pupils joining, by now numbering 150. Along with this the education board granted more funding and further building work; this was followed by a new hall, kitchen and a woodwork room. Miss Ward died in October 1935 to be replaced by the former head of Farnborough Grammar School, Mr R H May.

County High School 1939–1950

The school by this time had grown even further to a high school enrolling 400 students and as young as eleven.

Grammar school 1950–1953

In 1950 the headmaster decided that the school should be turned into a grammar school and students would therefore have to pass the 11-plus to join. At this stage the school was still accepting both sexes.

The motto in the early 50s was "Manners Makyth Man", borrowed from Winchester College (the school song "Forty Years On" was borrowed from Harrow). The new motto "Inter Silvas Quaerere Verum" (Seek Truth [or Learning] Amongst the Trees), an adaptation from Horace's Epistles, refers to the school's location in the New Forest.

County High School (again) 1953–1960

In 1953 the headmaster changed the name back to High School. The name remained for seven years until the local education authority sanctioned the change to a grammar school.

Grammar School 1960–1970

The name of grammar school remained for the following ten years after being reinstated by the local education authority.

College 1970–

The school was converted into a sixth form college in 1969, leaving all the surrounding schools to continue lower school education in the area, and became a tertiary college in 1985.

== Head masters/mistresses and principals ==
- Moore 1909–1913 (Head Mistress)
- Emma Clara Ward 1913–1935 (Head Mistress)
- Green 1935 (Acting Head Master)
- R. H. May 1935 – 1949 (Head Master)
- L. R. Wood 1949–1970 (Head Master to 1969, then Principal)
- A. J. Baker 1970–1989 (Principal)
- Mike J. Snell 1989–2006 (Principal)
- Di Roberts 2006–2020 (Principal)
- Polly Perkins 2021–2022 (Principal)
- Kate Webb 2022 May-September (Interim Principal)
- Steve Wain 2022-May 2023 (Interim Principal)
- Helen Odhams May 2023 onwards (Principal)

== Notable former pupils ==
- Birdy (born 1996), singer, songwriter, and musician
- Sir Raymond Carr (1919–2015), historian
- John Darwin, historian
- Tom Friend (born 1991), cricketer
- Dame Heather Hallett (born 1949), judge of the Court of Appeal
- Patrick Harverson (born 1962), public relations executive and former journalist
- Guy Henry (born 1960), actor
- Danny Ings (born 1992), footballer
- Sir Derek Plumbly (born 1948), Diplomat Foreign Office, specialist in Middle East, former Ambassador to Saudi Arabia and Egypt
- Ian Wooldridge (1932–2007), Daily Mail sports journalist
- Justin Young (born 1987) of The Vaccines
- Sam Vokes (born 1989), footballer
- Christopher Scott (born 1967), space and atmospheric scientist
- Hannah Phillips (born 1999), Liberal Democrats councillor for Lymington and Pennington

== See also ==
- List of further education colleges in Hampshire
- National Union of Students of the United Kingdom
