= New Milton Town Hall =

Municipal building in New Milton, Hampshire, England

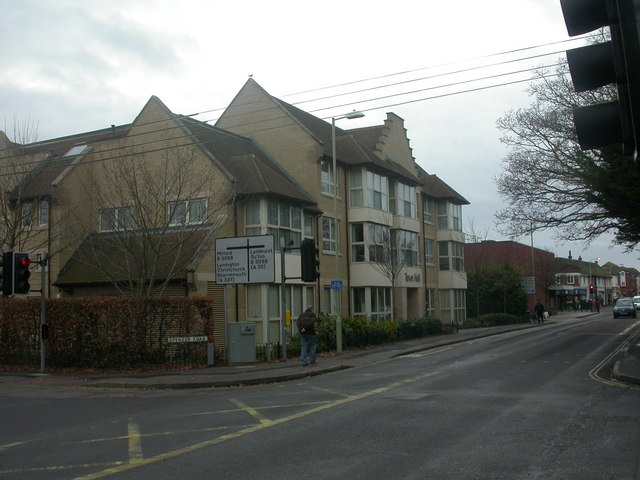
- The building in 2011

- Shown in Hampshire
- 50.7531°N 1.6541°W
- Location: Ashley Road, New Milton

History
- Built: 2004

Site notes
- Architectural style: Modern style

New Milton Town Hall is a municipal building in Ashley Road in New Milton, a town in Hampshire, in England. The building accommodates the offices and meeting place of New Milton Town Council.

== History ==
Following significant population growth, largely associated with residential expansion around New Milton railway station, a new urban district was created from part of Lymington Rural District in 1926. The new council purchased a private house, "Rosebank", on the east side of Station Road for use as its new council offices. It was a large house, designed in the late Victorian style, built red brick and completed in the early 20th century. The design involved a broadly symmetrical main frontage of three bays facing onto Station Road. The central bay featured a wide porch on the ground floor with a Diocletian window on the first floor and a dormer window at attic level. The left-hand bay was fenestrated by bay windows on the first two floors, with a small square window in the gable above. The right-hand bay was fenestrated by tri-partite windows on the first two floors, also with a small square window in the gable above.

The urban district, which was short-lived, was absorbed into Lymington Municipal Borough in 1932. The council offices in Station Road then accommodated a small museum in the 1930s. The building was later used to accommodate the borough engineer's department, the register office and, from 1951, the local public library. Following the completion of Lymington Town Hall, it went to become the local community centre in 1966. In 1974, the local community association moved to purpose-built premises on the site of Ashcombe House in Osborne Road and the old council offices were subsequently demolished to make way for a row of shops known as Osborne House.

Following local government reorganisation in 1974, Lymington Borough Council was replaced by the enlarged New Forest District Council and, at local level, New Milton Town Council came into being in 1979. The new town council initially established its offices at No. 90 Station Road. However, by the late 20th century these offices were deemed inadequate and the town council decided to commission bespoke offices which could also be used by New Forest District Council and Hampshire County Council for the delivery of local services. The site they selected, on the south side of Ashley Road, had been occupied by some old clay pits.

The new building was designed in the modern style, built in brown brick at a cost of £1.5 million and was officially opened by the Duchess of Gloucester on 7 April 2004. The design involved an asymmetrical main frontage of eight bays facing onto Ashley Road. The fifth bay from the left, which was slightly projected forward, contained the main entrance on the ground floor and was fenestrated with casement windows on the first and second floors with a pyramid-shaped roof above. The fourth and eighth bays were also projected forward, fenestrated in a similar style and surmounted by pyramid-shaped roofs. A stepped gable spanned the fifth and sixth bays. Internally, in addition to the offices for the town council, the district council and the county council, there were offices for the Citizens Advice, while the first floor contained six flats managed by the Swaythling Housing Association.
