= New Forest & Lymington Volleyball =

English volleyball club based at the New Forest Volleyball Centre

New Forest Volleyball
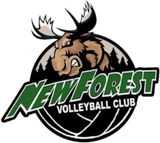
- NF Volleyball Logo
- Full name: New Forest Volleyball
- Nickname: 'Green Army,
- Founded: 2008
- Ground: New Forest Volleyball Centre, Ballard School
- Club President: James Kemp
- League: Men - NVL M2S; Women - NVL W1; SADVA - Men, Boys, Girls
- Website: Club home page

New Forest Volleyball is an English volleyball club based at the New Forest Volleyball Centre at Ballard School, England, affiliated with Volleyball England. The club has teams competing in the National Volleyball League, The Southampton and District Volleyball Association and has continued to develop junior volleyball in collaboration with Lymington Volleyball Club leading to progressing through several rounds of the U15, U16 and U18 National Cups over the last five years. At the Extraordinary General Meeting on 25 November 2013, the club merged with Lymington Volleyball Club to become New Forest & Lymington Volleyball. The club plays an active part in the South East Volleyball Association and many of its players have progressed into the Inter Regional Competitions.

== History ==
The club began life playing games at The Romsey School and training at Brockenhurst College in 2008/09. In 2009/10, the club moved both training and home matches to Applemore Health & Leisure and stayed there for four years. At the start of the 2013/14 season, the club returned to Brockenhurst. From the 2015/16 season, all Forest squads train at Ballard School (New Milton). From 2016/17 the Green Army will play all their National League/KO Cup matches at Noadswood School (Dibden Perlieu).

== Honours ==
The club has won Men's Division 3 South (2010, 2013 & 2016), won Women's Division 2 South (2016) and reached the National Women's Shield Final (2012). The Club received both the NVL Fundraising/Sponsorship and NVL Promotion awards in 2010, at the Annual Awards Evening at Bath Rugby Club. The Club's President and then Head Coach, James Kemp received Volleyball England's National Children's Coach of the Year Award (2011) as a result of his twenty-year commitment to the sport. Then present and former New Forest Junior's (Tyler Everitt, Michael Johnson and Richard Yates) represented England South at the UK School Games in Newcastle. At the end of the 2012/13 season, Forest collected not only the league trophy, but additionally Michael Johnson collected the Men's 3 South Most Valuable Player award and Ramona Deneil collected the Women's 3 South Most Valuable Player Award. Sam James was New Forest's SADVA Player of the Year in 2012/13. In 2013, Teams representing New Forest District Council won gold medals in the U14 Boys, U14 Girls, U16 Boys and U16 Girls Volleyball Competitions at the Hampshire Games in Aldershot.

=== National competitions ===
Title	Years won	Years runner-up
NVL Men 3 South	2009/10, 2012/13, 2015/16	
National Shield Women		2011/12
