= Lymington Times and New Milton Advertiser =

Weekly English newspaper

New Milton Advertiser and Lymington Times
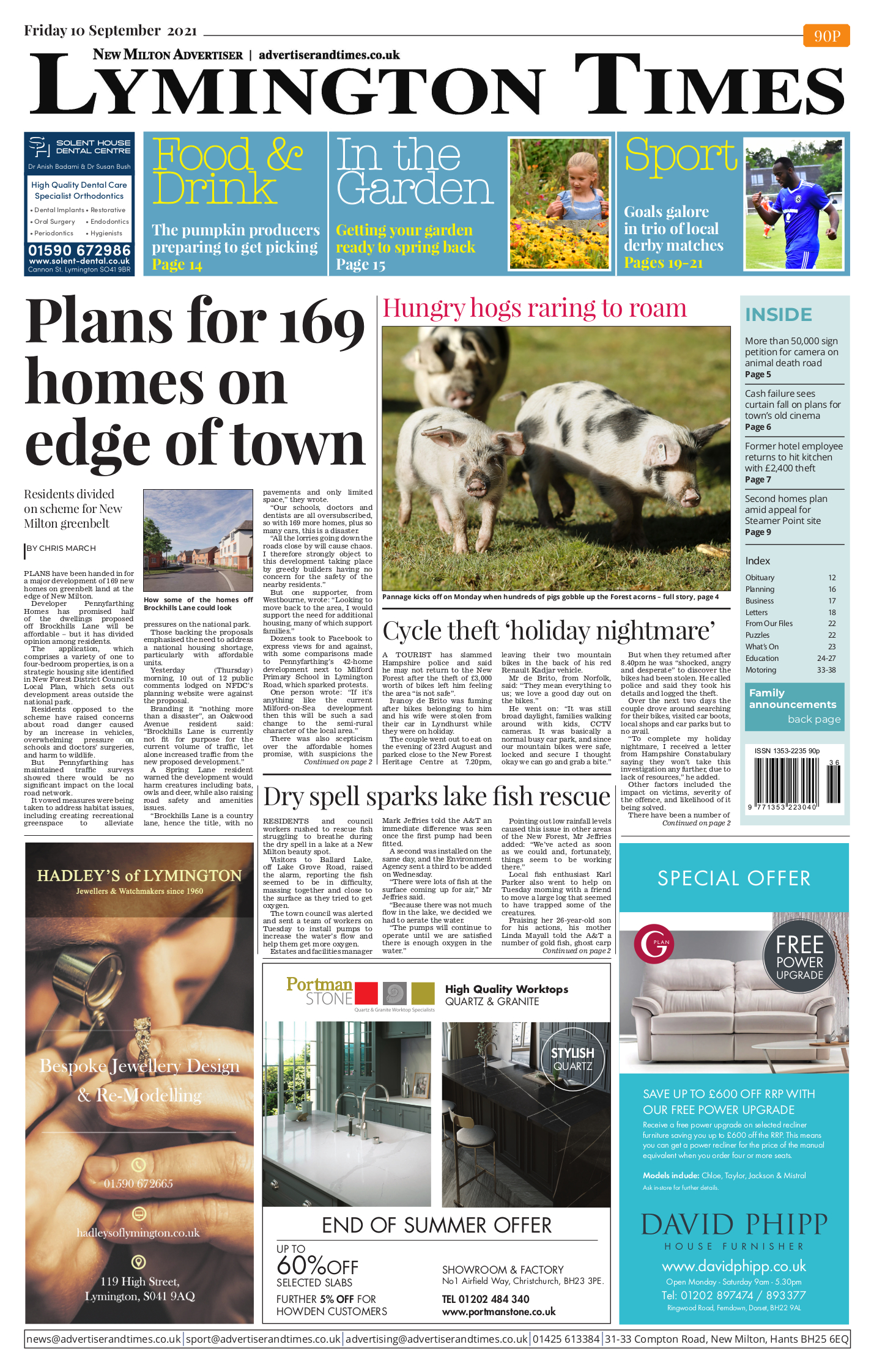
- Type: Weekly newspaper
- Format: Broadsheet
- Owner(s): Iliffe News & Media and Peter & Rory Fowler
- Publisher: Highland News and Media Limited
- Editor: Lyndon Hogg
- Founded: 1928/1932
- Headquarters: 11 Mallard Buildings, Station Road, New Milton BH25 6HY
- ISSN: 1353-2227
- OCLC number: 1064866596
- Website: www.advertiserandtimes.co.uk

The Lymington Times and New Milton Advertiser are weekly English broadsheet newspapers which serve the New Forest in Hampshire and neighbouring Christchurch in Dorset. They are published by Highland News and Media Limited.

== Areas served ==
New Milton, Barton-on-Sea, Highcliffe, Christchurch, Milford-on-Sea, Brockenhurst, Burley, Lymington, Sway, Boldre, Beaulieu, Hythe, Fawley, Waterside and Totton, Ringwood and Fordingbridge. The outskirts of Bournemouth and Southampton.

== History ==
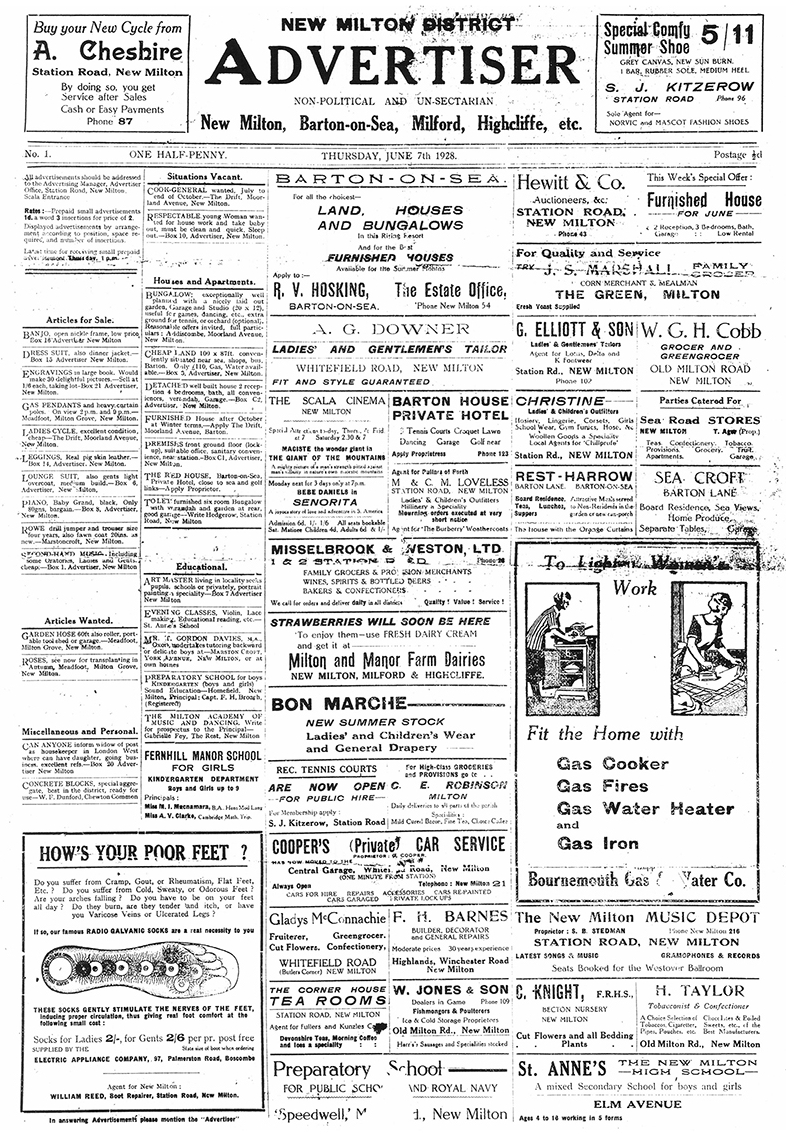
The first edition of the New Milton Advertiser, 7 June 1928

The first edition of the New Milton Advertiser was launched on 7 June 1928, a single 16in x 12in sheet which sold for 1d. The first proprietor was Kirby Wynne.

In 1932, the New Milton Advertiser was bought by Conrad Davies and Frederick Curry, who bought a plot of land on Old Milton Road to house a second-hand printer. They also invested in a property in Lymington to found the Lymington Times.

In 1936, Charles Curry, son of Frederick Curry, joined the company as a 16-year-old reporter.

In 1938, a circa-1880 rotary press was installed at the New Milton office and run by Charles Curry.

By 1947, the paper had increased to eight pages, and the combined circulation of the New Milton Advertiser & Lymington Times was 8,000.

In 1950, a Northern Press and Engineering Company rotary press was installed and situated in the building adjacent to the Advertiser & Times offices. The press was limited to a paper size of 32 pages and was powered by a John Deere tractor engine.

In 1966, CT Curry died aged 75 and Charles took over as editor.

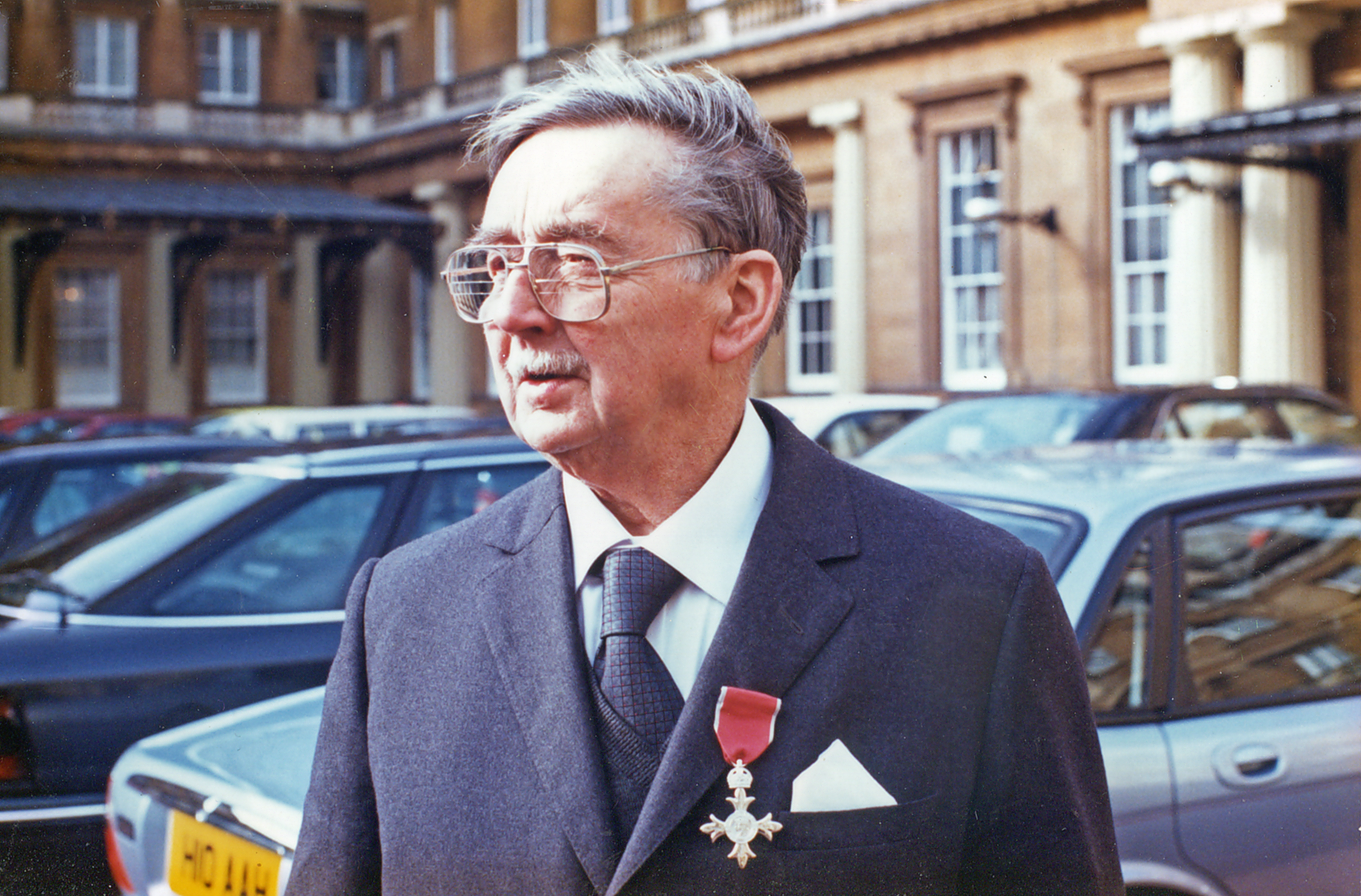
Charles Curry after receiving his MBE in 1997

A Hoe and Crabtree Viscount printer was installed in 1990, which the previous owner had converted to direct litho, is purchased and erected on the New Milton Site. The press was constructed over a period of five years and allowed a progressive change from hot metal to photosetting. By 1995 the handover to the Hoe and Crabtree Viscount was complete, and the last run of the old Northern Press and Engineering Company rotary machine was in October.

Charles Curry was made an MBE for services to journalism in 1997.

By 2000, the Advertiser & Times was believed to be the last newspaper in the UK which still relied on hot metal, merging the old hot metal techniques with new computerised technology.

In 2001, the Advertiser & Times stopped using its two Linotype hot metal machines after 70 years of service.

2016 saw the first colour publications by the Advertiser & Times which, with the introduction of a fortnightly full-colour Property Focus followed by special publications showcasing the New Forest Show, New Forest Marathon, New Forest NPA Park Life and First Class.

On 26 January 2018, after 85 years of black-and-white printing, the newspaper's first full colour edition was launched.

In 2019, Charles Curry died aged 96, after editing the newspaper until he retired aged 91

In October 2020, the titles were bought by a consortium comprising regional publishers Iliffe News and Media and father-and-son pair Peter and Rory Fowler.
