= Ashley, New Forest =

Village and parish in Hampshire, England

Coordinates: 50.75795°N 1.63790°W

Ashley
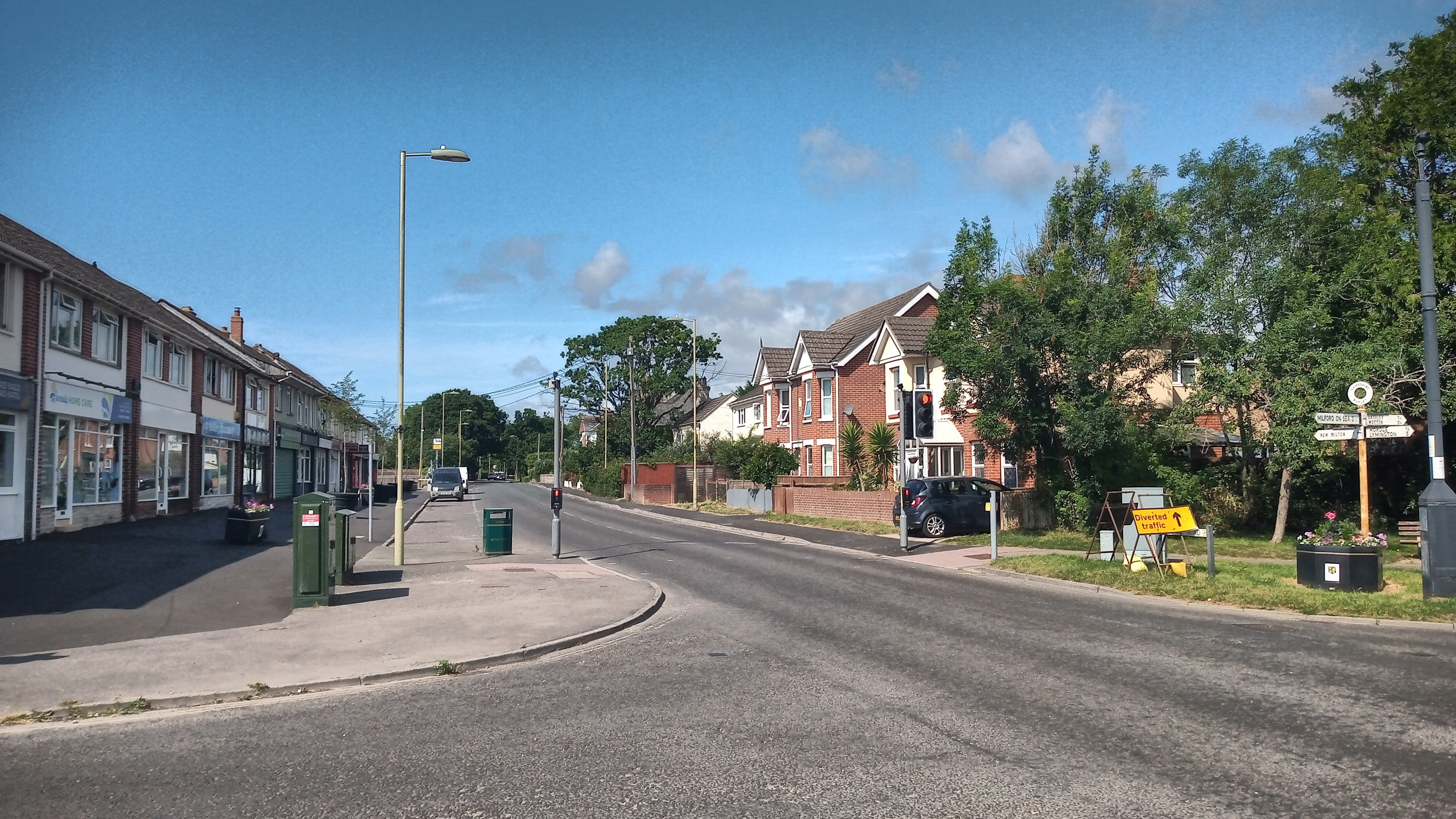
- Ashley Crossroads

- Location within Hampshire
- Population: 7,725 (built-up area, 2021)
- OS grid reference: SZ257954
- Civil parish: New Milton, Hordle
- District: New Forest
- Shire county: Hampshire
- Region: South East
- Country: England
- Sovereign state: United Kingdom
- Post town: New Milton
- Postcode district: BH25
- Dialling code: 01425
- Police: Hampshire and Isle of Wight
- Fire: Hampshire and Isle of Wight
- Ambulance: South Central
- UK Parliament: New Forest West

Ashley is a village located in the southwest of Hampshire, England. It lies on the eastern outskirts of New Milton in the New Forest district, and is two miles (3 km) inland from the Solent. Its history dates back to the Domesday Book of 1086, when two estates were recorded. In the 15th century much of Ashley merged with a neighbouring manor, and the estate became known as Ashley Arnewood. As a village, Ashley began to develop in the 19th century when a church and a school were built. Most of the current village was built in the 20th century, and today Ashley is effectively a suburb of New Milton.

Ashley does not have fixed formal boundaries. Following the 2021 census, the Office for National Statistics defined an Ashley 'built-up area' which includes parts of the civil parishes of New Milton and Hordle, and which had a population of 7,725.

== History ==
=== Prehistory ===
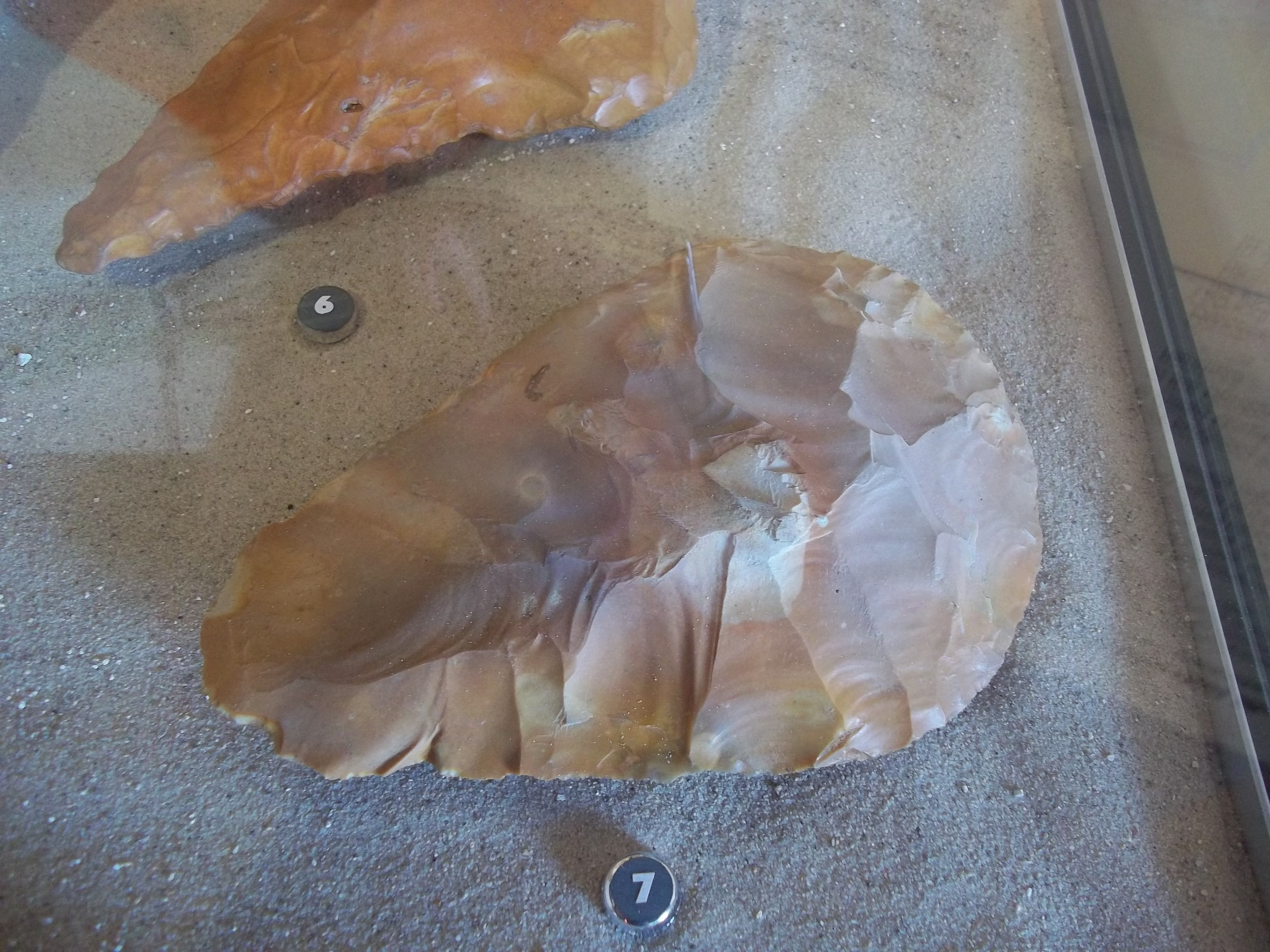
Stone Age hand axe found at Ashley, now on display in the Red House Museum

Humans have lived in the Ashley area for thousands of years. Two Palaeolithic hand axes were found in gravel excavated from the gravel pits at Ashley, and are now in the Red House Museum in Christchurch, Dorset. A third axe was found in 1962.

=== Early history ===
The name Ashley means "ash wood/clearing". In the Domesday Book of 1086, two estates, Esselie and Esselei, are recorded. The first was possessed by "Nigel the doctor" from Roger de Montgomerie, 1st Earl of Shrewsbury; before 1066 it had been held by Saewulf. The other estate was in 1086 held by the sons of Godric Malf, who had himself held it from the king prior to 1066. Ashley was probably included in the grant of Christchurch made by Henry I to Richard de Redvers, because his successor Earl William in about 1200 granted an estate there in free marriage to Hawise the wife of William Avenel. She gave it to her son Nicholas, on whose death it went to his son William Avenel. He held it as the manor of Ashley, and when he died without children in 1253 it passed to the Crown. It was granted in the following year to Thomas Waleran in recognition of the good service rendered by him in Gascony, but in 1263 it was again in the hands of the lord of Christchurch, because Baldwin de Redvers, 7th Earl of Devon, died in possession of it in that year. At the beginning of the 14th century Reginald de Bettesthorne had lands in Ashley worth 5 shillings yearly.

=== Modern era ===
A Baptist chapel was constructed at Ashley in 1817. The Baptist church has been rebuilt twice, the first time in 1897, and the second time in 1993. The first Anglican church was built in 1904. It was replaced by a new building in 1957, and is dedicated to Saint Peter. The bell in St Peter's church is much older than the church, and dates from 1593.

Ashley Great and Little Commons were inclosed in 1862. The population of Ashley in the 1860s was just over 500 people. William Charles Retford, who became a maker of violin bows, was born in Ashley in 1875. He would later publish his memories of growing up in Ashley:

I was born (June 1875) in a cottage in what is now Ashley Road; situated south of the lane at the base of the hill by the brook. This spot was known as "Litchford". As a tiny tot it had the elements of a fairyland to me. Fern Hill woods were west of the lane, east were a narrow meadow and Ashley Arnewood woods. In the spring these were a carpet of bluebells through which I waded; they were shoulder high to me. We never entered Fern Hill Woods; they were a game reserve and there were notices saying "Beware of Spring Guns." On the north edge of the lane from the top of the hill to Ashley Cross Road wild daffodils grew by thousands, none to the south but primroses and violets. . . . Mrs Corbin kept a little shop at the Cross Road, where we bought our sweets, a parrot on the counter. This was furze or common ground and a bog with water lilies. The railway was built over this and opened 1887-8.

Mrs Corbin's little shop at the cross roads described by William Charles Retford has now been restored to a Victorian looking barbershop with original tongue and groove wood from when it was built.

A school was built at Ashley in 1879, at the west end of Hare Lane. In its final years it was used as a special school, but it was closed in 1987 and demolished soon afterwards. In 1939, a secondary school was built at Ashley (Ashley County Secondary School). The school was merged with the nearby New Milton school ("Arnewood") in 1970, and shortly afterwards Ashley school became a junior school.

Writers Laurence Housman and his sister Clemence Housman lived at Ashley between 1913 and 1924.

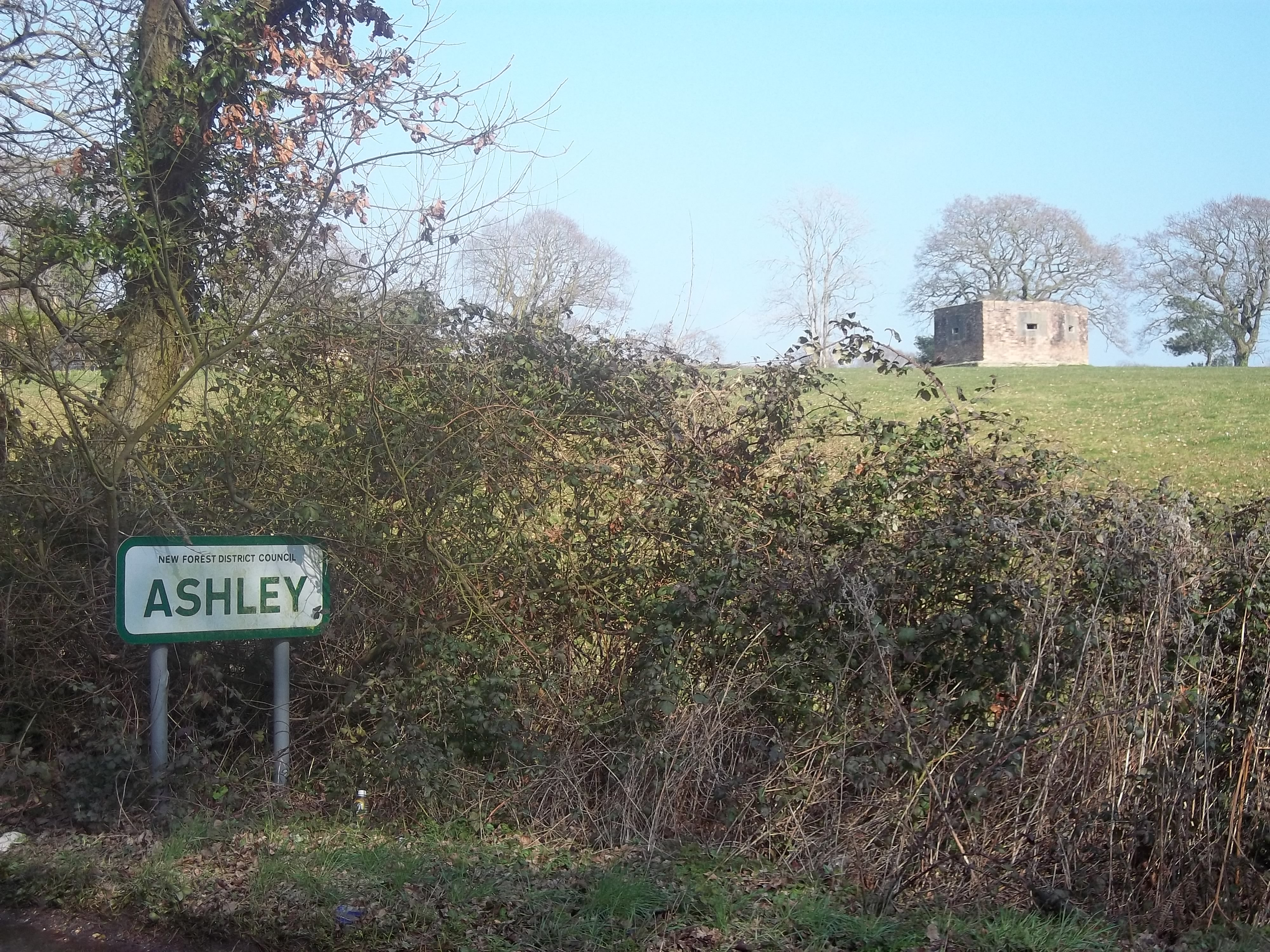
Pillbox (right) visible in the fields of Lower Ashley

In World War II, two fortified bunkers known as pillboxes were built in Ashley to defend against a possible German invasion by sea. One of these pillboxes can still be seen in a field in Lower Ashley today. One other relic from World War II is visible on the northeastern corner of Ashley Crossroads. The car repair workshop there was originally one of the aircraft hangars at RAF Beaulieu.

For decades a major industry in the area has been gravel extraction. New Milton Sand and Ballast has been extracting gravel from gravel pits in south Ashley since before 1950.

== Landmarks ==
=== Ashley Arnewood ===
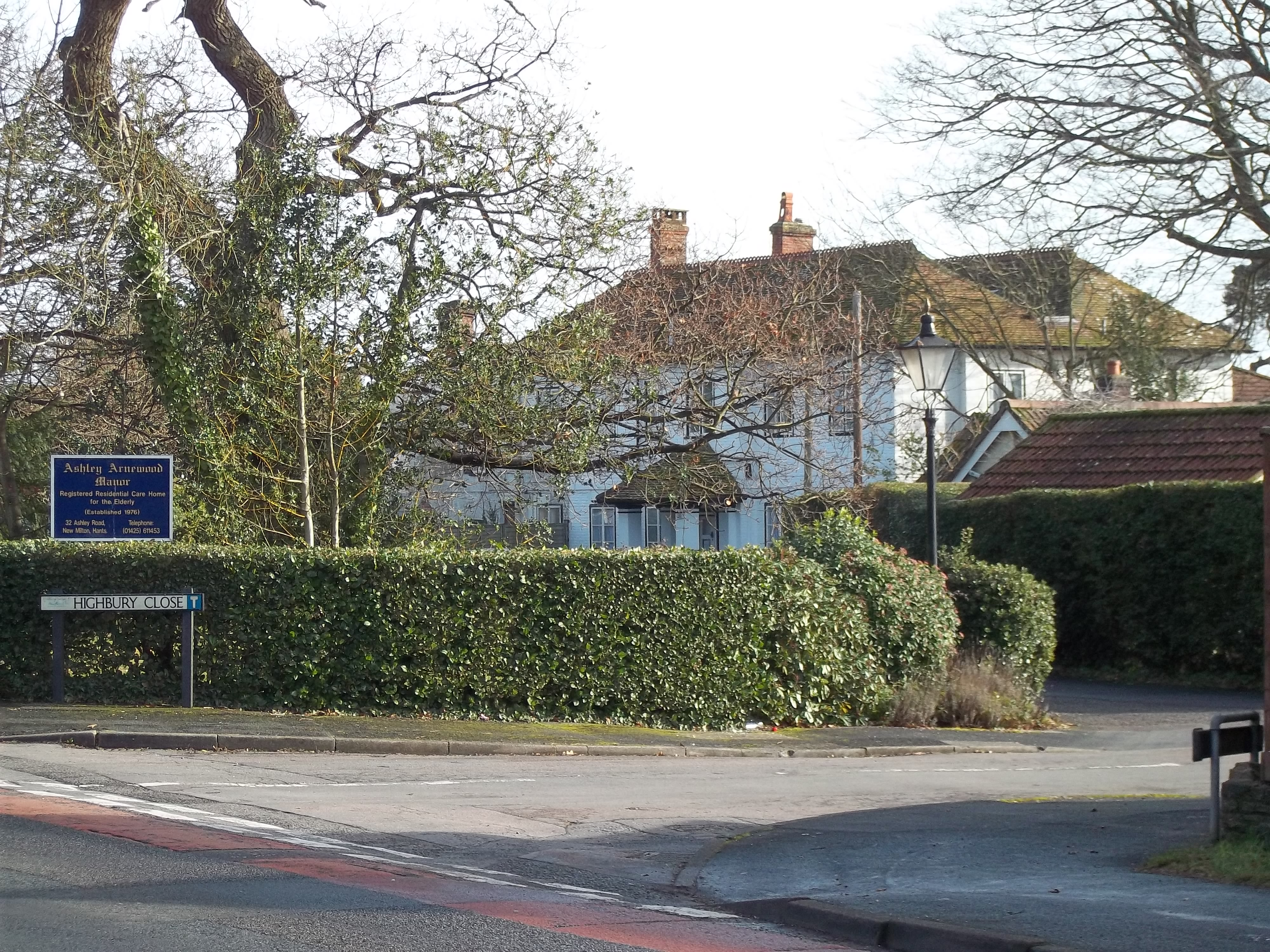
Ashley Arnewood Manor. An early 19th-century house with an 18th-century wing

At a later date the manor of Ashley was joined with part of another manor to the east called Arnewood, the combination of the two being known as the manor of Ashley Arnewood. Katherine, the daughter of Sir Maurice Berkeley, at her death in 1494 owned the land in Arnewood together with an estate in West and East Ashley, all of which passed to her daughter Warborough, who became the wife of Sir William Compton. William Compton, whose family seat was in Compton Wynyates in Warwickshire, was Groom of the Bedchamber and favourite courtier of Henry VIII. Other estates which came into his possession include the New Forest manors of Bisterne and Minstead.

The manors of Arnewood and Ashley remained in the Compton family up to the 17th century, but by 1632 it was in the possession of Roger Tulse. In 1670 it belonged to George Stanley, and an estate in north-east Ashley is still called Stanleys. In 1803 William Ireland and his wife Betty transferred the manor of Ashley Arnewood to Richard Randell. In 1845, the politician John Arthur Roebuck purchased Ashley Arnewood, which is described as having 200 acres (0.81 km^{2}) of land attached to it. Because of his engagements in London, much of the actual farming at Ashley Arnewood was conducted by his wife until they chose to sell the estate in 1854. The estate was later purchased by the political philosopher and author Auberon Herbert in the 1870s and he lived there until his wife's death in 1886. The old manor house of Ashley Arnewood still survives on the western side of Ashley, although today it is a nursing home.

=== Ashley Manor Farm ===
Another manor at Ashley still exists as a farm to the southwest of the village. Ashley Manor Farm, on Lymington Road, is an 18th-century farmhouse. It is grade II listed.

=== Ashley Clinton ===
Another estate centre, dating from the 19th century, was that of Ashley Clinton, to the south of the current village, it was the residence of Lieutenant-Colonel Henry Renebald Clinton. The lodge, which still stands, is grade II listed.

== Amenities ==
A parade of shops, containing a convenience store, pharmacy, four Take-Away food restaurants, two hairdressers, and a physiotherapy store, is located next to Ashley Crossroads, the original Ashley shop is now a traditional barbershop and strength and conditioning gym. A large recreation ground is located close to the centre of Ashley, and is home to New Milton and District Rugby Club. Two primary schools are located in Ashley, Ashley Infant school and Ashley Junior school.

The village had two pubs, but the Oak and Yaffle (located in the north of the village) closed in 2012 due to poor ratings and the Ashley Hotel (near the middle of the village) closed in 2015 after many unfortunate occurrences led to next to no customers.
