= Bashley (Rydal) Cricket Club =

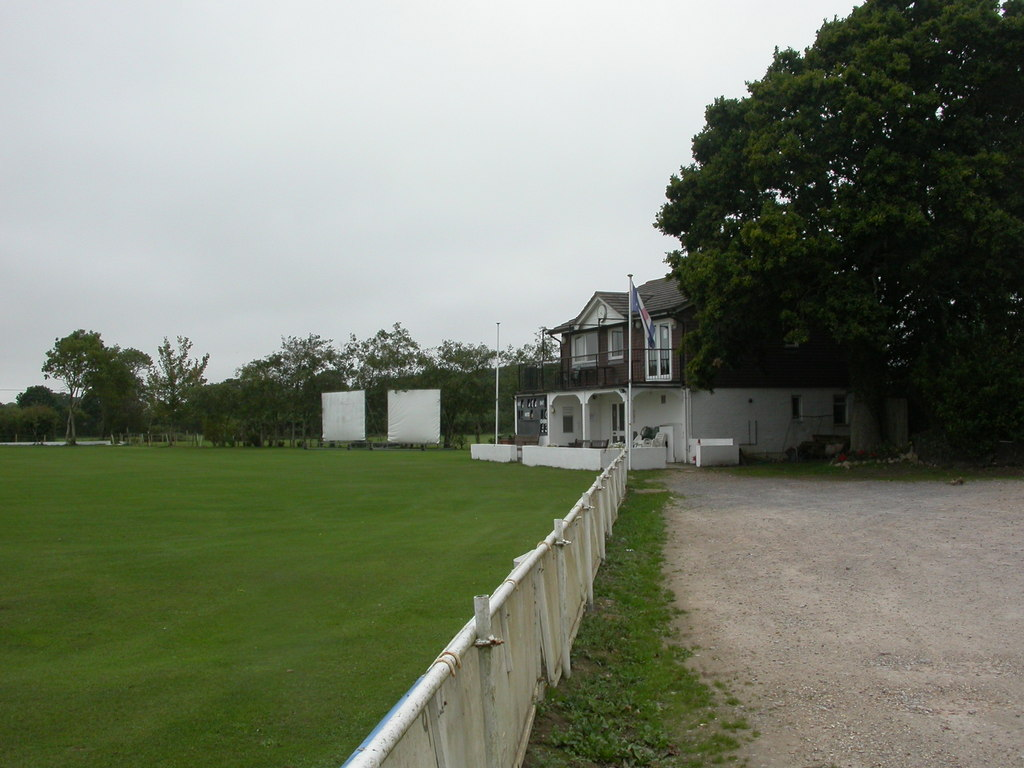

Bashley (Rydal) Cricket Club is an amateur cricket club based at Bashley in Hampshire. The club's first team plays in the Southern Premier Cricket League, which is one of the ECB Premier Leagues that are the highest level of the amateur, recreational sport in England, and Wales.

== History ==
The club was founded, as The Rydal Cricket Club, in 1947 at the Rydal Hotel in New Milton, and played in local cricket in the Bournemouth area. It moved to its present ground at Bashley in 1979. The club's official name is still "Bashley (Rydal) Cricket Club".

Bashley (Rydal) was promoted into the Southern cricket league in 1994, and has been a member of the ECB-backed Southern Premier Cricket League since its formation in 2000. They were winners of the SPL T20 cup in 2010 and 2012 and were Premier Division champions in 2019.

== See also ==
- Bashley (Rydal) CC website
