= Patrick Harverson =

British journalist

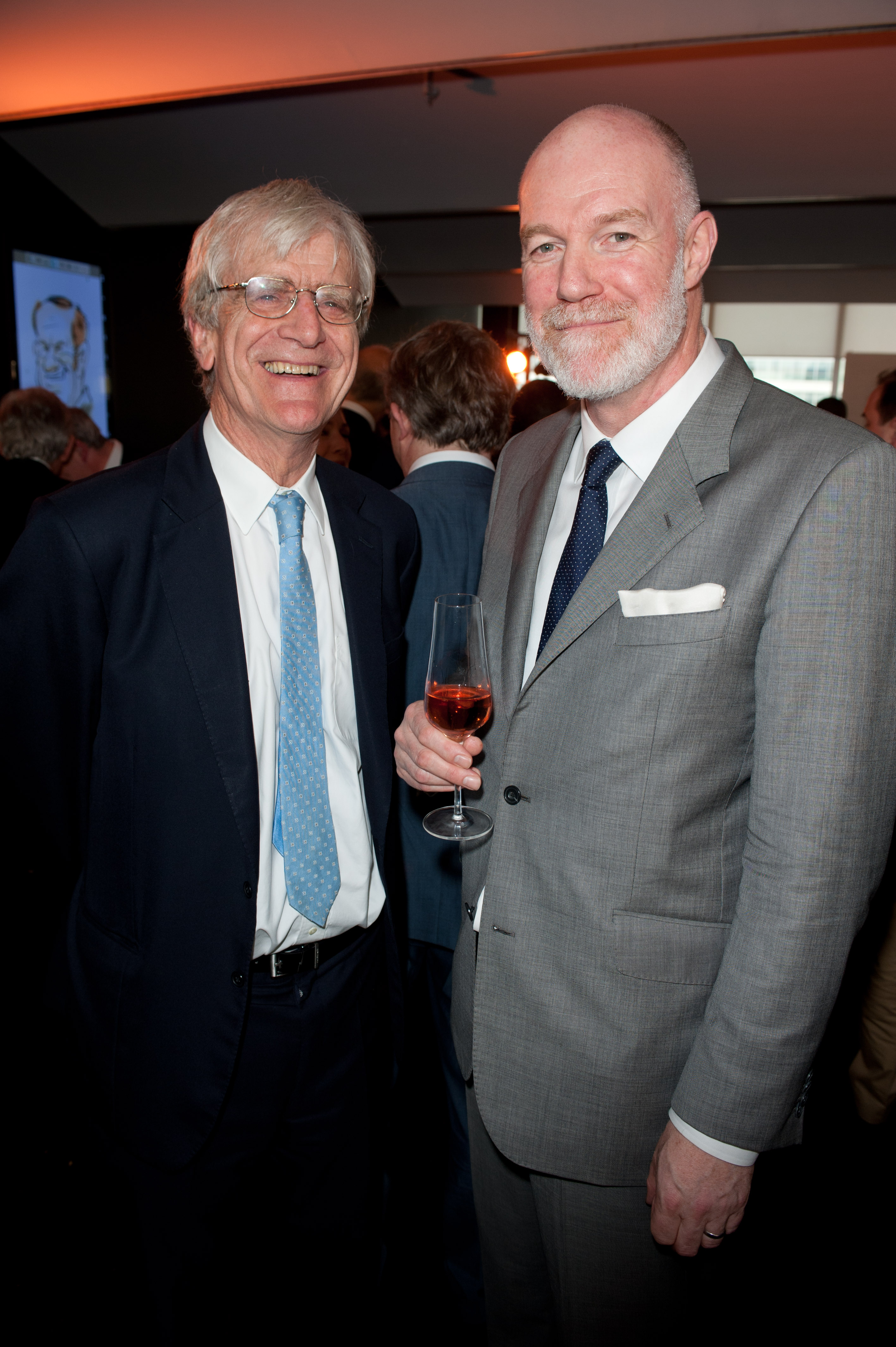
- Harverson (right) with Sir Richard Lambert, 2013
- Born: Patrick Richard Harverson; 1962 (age 63–64)
- Education: Brockenhurst College
- Alma mater: London School of Economics
- Occupations: Communications manager, journalist

Patrick Richard Harverson LVO is a public relations executive and former journalist. Since 2013, he has been a managing partner of Milltown Partners LLP. He was previously the Communications Secretary to the then-Prince of Wales and Duchess of Cornwall.

== Early life ==
Patrick Harverson was born in 1962, and educated at Belmont Abbey, Hereford, Brockenhurst College, Hampshire, and the London School of Economics.

== Journalism ==
Harverson worked for the Financial Times newspaper from 1988 to 2000. Roles covered included stock market reporter 1988–1989, economics staff writer 1989–1990, New York correspondent 1990–1995, business reporter 1995–1997, and sports correspondent 1997–2000.

== Public relations ==
From the Financial Times, Harverson joined Manchester United as Director of Communications in October 2000.

He joined the Office of the Prince of Wales on 2 February 2004.

In 2013, Harverson left the Royal Household to enter the private sector and he joined Milltown Partners LLP as a managing partner.

== Other work ==
Harverson is a trustee of the Tusk Trust since 2015.

== Honours ==
Harverson was appointed Lieutenant of the Royal Victorian Order (LVO) in the 2013 New Year Honours.
