= Wootton, New Forest =

Hamlet in Hampshire, England

Coordinates: 50.7837°N 1.6533°W

Wootton
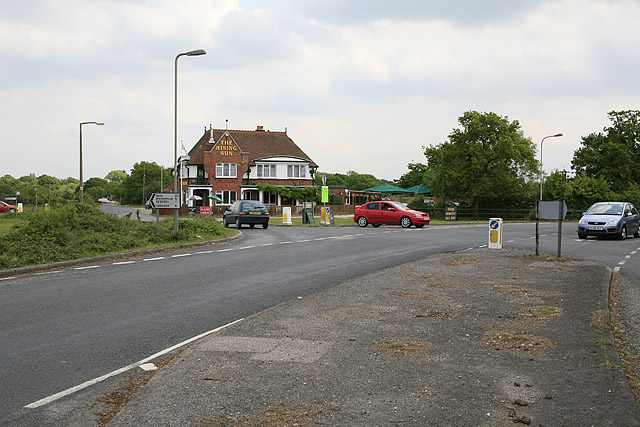
- Rising Sun pub at Wootton

- Location within Hampshire
- OS grid reference: SZ245982
- Civil parish: New Milton
- District: New Forest
- Shire county: Hampshire
- Region: South East
- Country: England
- Sovereign state: United Kingdom
- Post town: NEW MILTON
- Postcode district: BH25
- Dialling code: 01425
- Police: Hampshire and Isle of Wight
- Fire: Hampshire and Isle of Wight
- Ambulance: South Central
- UK Parliament: New Forest West

Wootton is a hamlet in the civil parish of New Milton in Hampshire, England. It is in the south of the New Forest.

== Overview ==
Wootton is just north of the village of Bashley in the civil parish of New Milton, although the farmland and woodland to the north of Wootton is in the parish of Brockenhurst. Locally the hamlet is known principally for the Rising Sun public house.

== History ==
The name Wootton derives from Old English for "wood farm". According to the Domesday Book, Wootton ("Odetune") was held by one Godric from the King before 1066, but by 1086, most of the estate had been placed under the New Forest. A Primitive Methodist chapel was erected in Wootton after a preacher visited the hamlet in 1843 and "converted a number of sinners . . . and formed a society of nine members." The chapel building still survives and is a red brick structure with a slate roof on Tiptoe Road. The two-storey brick building to the west of it was once a shop. In 1855 the population of Wootton is reported as including an inn-keeper for the Rising Sun, a shop-keeper, a schoolmistress, a post-office "receiver", a shoemaker, two blacksmiths, and two carpenters. In the 19th century Wootton had a Church of England village school, but this burned down in 1914, and a new school was built in nearby Tiptoe.

The Rising Sun public house at Wootton has been on its present site for over two hundred years. The inn was rebuilt at the beginning of the 20th century, and it was described by one visitor in 1907 as "the best hostelry and the most moderate I have come across in England".

Wootton was once entirely within the parish of New Milton, but in 1926 the land to the north of the hamlet was annexed into the civil parish of Rhinefield, which itself was eventually incorporated into the parish of Brockenhurst.
