= Ian Wooldridge =

British sports journalist

Ian Edmund Wooldridge, OBE (14 January 1932 – 4 March 2007) was a British sports journalist. He was with the Daily Mail for nearly 50 years.

== Biography ==
Born in New Milton, Hampshire, Wooldridge left Brockenhurst Grammar School with two school certificates, for English and art. After National Service and an apprenticeship on newspapers in New Milton and Bournemouth, he became a reporter on the News Chronicle in 1956. After a spell with the Sunday Dispatch, he moved to the Daily Mail, which absorbed the News Chronicle in 1960.

=== Early Fleet Street career ===
Initially a cricket correspondent at the Mail, from 1972 Wooldridge wrote a weekly column which spread to other sports. He covered 10 Olympic Games, including the Sarajevo Winter Olympics in 1984. Writing before those games, he predicted a tragedy, but changed his mind after being there, saying they were amongst the best he had ever seen. He covered the Munich Olympics in 1972, and caused resentment among British runners with a brutish and insensitive attack on David Bedford; it emerged that he had had to take some ribbing from foreign journalists over Bedford's failure in the 10,000 metres. As well as the Olympics, Wooldridge covered Wimbledon tennis championships, heavyweight boxing world title bouts, football World Cups, Open and US Masters golf championships and America's Cups for the paper. His America's Cup reporting opened the sport to a wide audience beyond sailing enthusiasts. He was assisted by PR and friend David Redfern, of whom he said "with his help, the eyes of Coronation Street as well as the Squadron are on the Cup", but in reality it was Wooldridge's writing and interest that was the key. The last Olympics he covered was in Sydney in 2000.

He branched into other areas, writing on a revolution in Portugal, flying with the RAF's Red Arrows, riding the Cresta Run, sparring with Ugandan dictator Idi Amin, and running the bulls at Pamplona. Wooldridge was newspaper columnist of the year twice, sportswriter of the year five times and sports feature writer of the year four times. His first job had been on the New Milton Advertiser, covering the funeral of a coal merchant; he intercepted every mourner to write down his or her name – holding up the interment by more than half an hour.

Wooldridge ghosted a syndicated column for golfer Max Faulkner. Once, needing a good anecdote about Faulkner's Open success, he invented a story about the golfer just before he had teed off in the final round: Faulkner, he wrote, had scrawled "Open Champion 1949" on a ball which he handed to a young autograph hunter. Years later Wooldridge met American writer George Plimpton, who had come across the story. "Great tale", said Plimpton admiringly. "Total nonsense", Wooldridge replied.

=== Television career ===
Wooldridge made over 120 documentaries for various broadcasters, including the BBC. Titles of these include: Wooldridge on Whiskey; In the Highest Tradition; The Great Fishing Race; Behind the Lines; Trooping the Colour; and The British Challenge for the America's Cup 1983. His heyday was during the late 1970s and early 1980s. He also did a lot of voiceovers, most memorably for the British Gas advert that involved a baby swimming under water.

=== Opposition to apartheid ===
Wooldridge was an anti-apartheid advocate, supporting sportswriter John Arlott at the Cambridge Union in 1969 in speaking against sport with South Africa.

His opposition dated from his first cricket tour to South Africa. During the Port Elizabeth Test match, black South Africans were not only refused entry but beaten up by police. Because of problems with telephones, Wooldridge had to contact his London office from the committee room. Frank Keating, in The Guardian, recalled: "He had written his piece; now he had to read it at the top of his voice in the presence of about 30 hard-faced members of the republic's ruling broederband... as all 30 pairs of ears listened in the chilly, unwelcoming atmosphere, he took a deep breath and dictated: 'The wretchedly awful face of apartheid was displayed here today when...'"

== Awards ==
In the British Press Awards he was Columnist of the Year in 1975 and 1976; and Sportswriter of the Year in 1972, 1974, 1981 and 1989. The Sports Journalists' Association made him Sportswriter of the Year for 1986, 1987 and 1995; and it chose him as Sports Feature Writer of the Year in 1990 and 1996.

In May 2006, he won the London Press Club's Edgar Wallace award for outstanding reporting. The Press Club's chairman, Donald Trelford, described Wooldridge as "more than just a sports writer, he is a journalist of the highest calibre and a master of the written word".

== Death and legacy ==
Wooldridge died from cancer. His memorial service was at the Guards Chapel, Wellington Barracks, London on 27 June 2007.

Hugh McIlvanney, in The Sunday Times, wrote:

It is an honour to have worked in the same era as Ian Wooldridge, a precious privilege to have known him as a friend for more than 40 years. Though he would have snorted at the suggestion, he repeatedly pulled off the minor miracle of making our way of getting a living seem like a proper job for a grown-up person.
