= Ballard School (New Milton) =

School in Hampshire, England

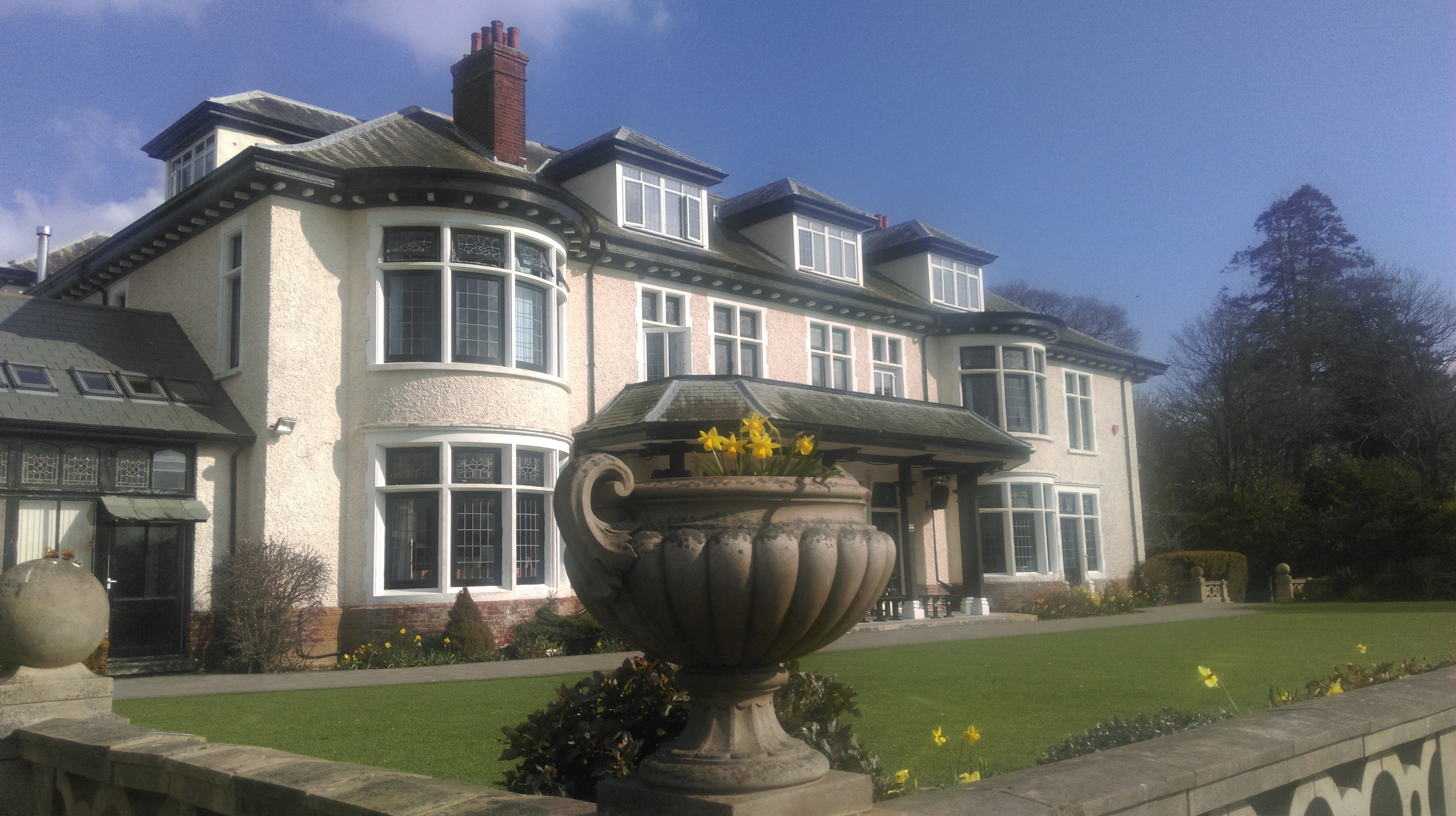

Location
- New Milton; Hampshire; England; 50.7620°N 1.6587°W

Information
- Type: Independent School
- Established: 1895
- Headmaster: Stuart Turner
- Age range: 2 to 16
- Campus size: 34 acres
- Communities served: Friends of Ballard School (FOBS)
- Website: ballardschool.co.uk

Ballard School is a private school located in New Milton, Hampshire, for children aged 2 to 16 years. The headmaster is Stuart Turner (since 2026).

Ballard School offers scholarships and bursaries, and does not require an entrance exam for admission

== History ==
Ballard School was opened as the Royal Naval School by William Higgs Colborne and James Cruickshank at Lee-on-the-Solent in August 1895. Great Ballard House was designed by Sydney Kelway Pope M.S.A, a Southampton architect. Around 1905, the Royal Navy requested that the name be changed and so it was renamed Edinburgh House School.

James Cruickshank married his partner's daughter, Louisa, in 1901. The school remained at premises in Manor Way, Lee-on-the-Solent throughout the first World War. Following the deaths of both William and James, Louisa became joint principal with her son Stuart.

When the Second World War began, the school left Lee, moving first to Wellington, Somerset and then in 1942 to Brightwell Baldwin, Oxfordshire. After the war, the school moved to the Great Ballard estate in New Milton in January 1946.

Great Ballard House was built in 1904 by John Arnold Ubsdell (2nd) and his wife Genevieve Ann (née Eads). In 1924, the house and estate had been leased to a newly-formed school named Great Ballard School. This school remained in occupation until 1940, when it moved to Clayesmore School in Iwerne Minster, Dorset before moving first to Stowell Park Gloucestershire, then Camberley Surrey and finally to Eartham West Sussex.

Edinburgh House School merged with Gorse Cliff and Marchwood Park Schools in 1969. In 1995 Edinburgh House School merged with Fernhill Manor, an adjoining girls school. The larger school was named Ballard School.

== Academics ==
Ballard School provides education for four key groups. Ballard School Pre-Prep consists of Nursery, Reception and Year 2. Lower Prep consists of KS2 year 3, 4 and 5. Upper Prep consists of KS2 year 6 and KS3 year 7 and 8. Senior consists of year 9, 10 and 11.

In 2015 and 2016, Ballard School achieved a 100% pass rate of A* to C GCSE results in English and Maths with 98% of the cohort achieving the Gold standard of at least five ‘good passes’ at A* to C grades (including English and Maths graded at 4 and above).

== Inspection Reports ==
Ballard School has been judged to be 'excellent & outstanding' by the Independent Schools Inspectorate. All reports are available on their website.

== Notable alumni ==
- Dennis Cambell Royal Navy and inventor of the angled deck for aircraft carriers
- Arthur Marshall, Broadcaster
- Tim Nurse, field hockey player
- Robert Lawrence, Folk Singer
