= The Arnewood School =

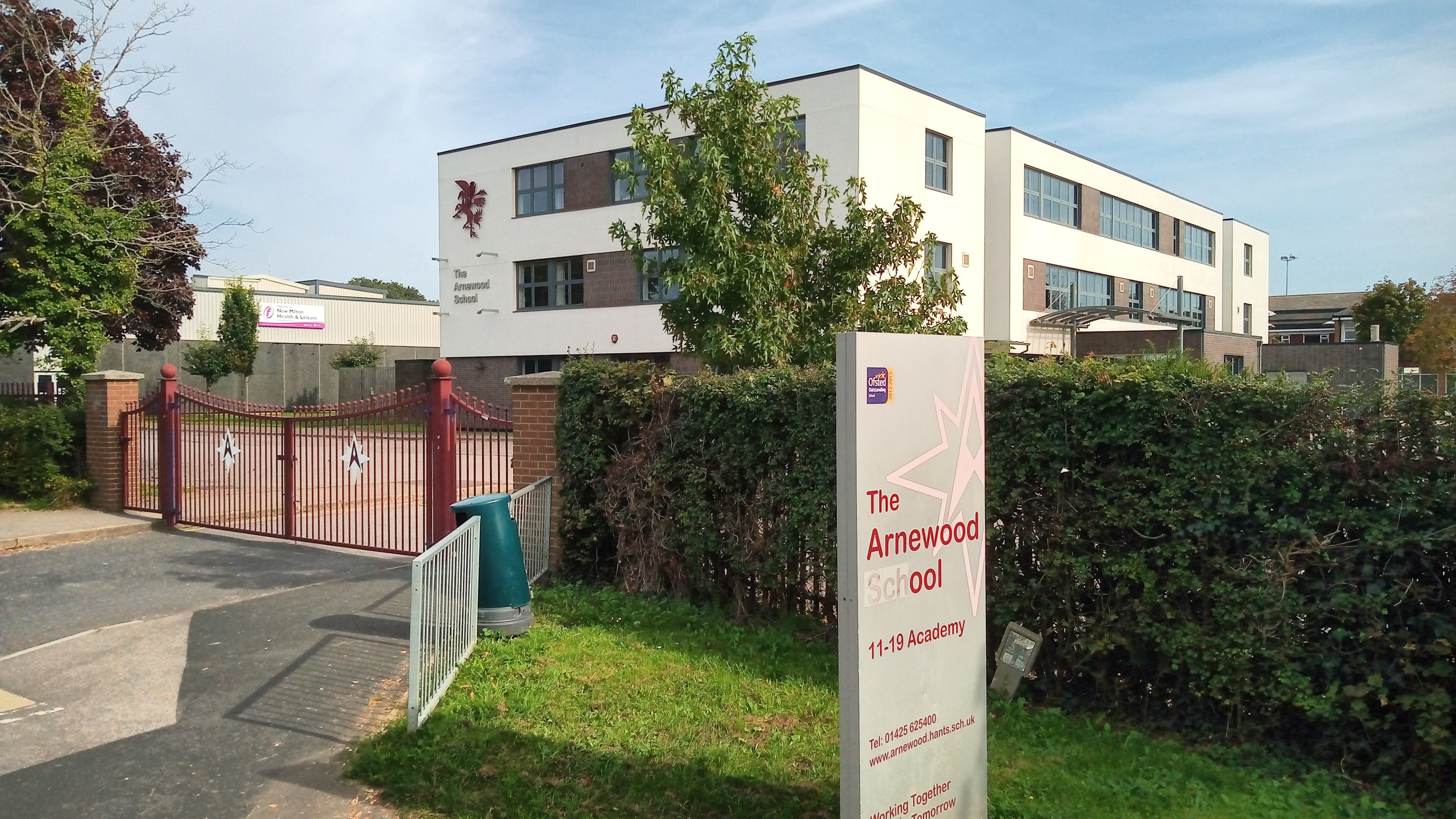

Location
- Gore Road; New Milton, Hampshire, BH25 6RS; England; 50.7506°N 1.6637°W

Information
- Type: Academy
- Department for Education URN: 136652 Tables
- Ofsted: Reports
- Headteacher: Jamie Anderson
- Gender: Mixed
- Age: 11 to 19
- Enrolment: 1084 (2018-2019)
- Website: https://www.arnewood.hants.sch.uk/

The Arnewood School is a mixed secondary school and sixth form located in New Milton in the English county of Hampshire.

The school was converted to academy status on 1 April 2011. It used to be a Foundation School with Technology College status, directly controlled by Hampshire County Council. However Arnewood continues to coordinate with Hampshire County Council for admissions.

The Arnewood School offers GCSEs, Level 2 BTECs and a Level 2 VTCT as programmes of study for KS4 pupils. Students in the sixth form have the option to study from a range of A Levels, Level 3 BTECs and a Level 2 VTCT. The school was judged as "outstanding" by Ofsted in January 2013. It was judged as "good" by Ofsted in October 2018. It was judged as “inadequate” (the lowest rating) by Ofsted in 2024. However, in 2024, the Sixth Form was rated as "good" by Ofsted.

In February 2016, former teacher Tyrone Mark, was jailed for having indecent material of children on his phone and laptop. After he was banned from teaching after providing a teenager alcohol, condoms and keys to his house.

Later that year, a school scretary, Jane Farmer, was found guilty of htting a pupil. Farmer was ordered to carry out 100 hours of unpaid work.

The current headteacher, Jamie Anderson, was formerly a Deputy Headteacher at Bournemouth School until December 2022, after which he became headteacher at Arnewood. Pupils familiar with both schools have recognised some Bournemouth School ethos, methods and slogans (such as “Ready, Respectful, Safe”) being used at Arnewood.

== Qualifications ==
GCSEs

The Arnewood School offers various GCSEs. There are 5 currently compulsory subjects, being GCSE English, GCSE English Literature, GCSE Mathematics, Physical Education and GCSE Combined Science - there is also PSHE which is not a linear qualification; without examinations at the end of the course.

The Arnewood School also offers optional GCSEs. As of 2025, these are GCSE History, GCSE Geography, GCSE French, GCSE German, GCSE Triple Science, GCSE Computer Science, GCSE Music, GCSE Drama, GCSE Food Technology, GCSE I-Media, GCSE P.E. (including core P.E.), GCSE Philosophy and Ethics, GCSE Media Studies, GCSE Childcare, GCSE Art and Design, GCSE Textiles and GCSE 3D Design, and GCSE Construction.

The Arnewood School also offers re-sits or sittings of GCSE Mathematics and GCSE English language for its sixth-form.

A-Levels

The Arnewood Sixth offers differing Level 3 qualifications, some Level 2 vocational awards but mostly A-Levels.

As of 2025 these A-Levels include A-Level Art, A-Level Business Studies, A-Level Design and Technology, A-Level Drama and Theatre, A-Level English Media, A-Level English Language, A-Level English Literature, A-Level Geography, A-Level Government and Politics, A-Level Health and Social Care, A-Level History, A-Level Math, A-Level Further Math, A-level Photography, A-Level Law, A-Level Psychology, A-Level Religious Studies, A-Level Physics, A-Level Chemistry, A-Level Biology.

Arnewood Sixth also offer a Level 3 BTEC in Sport and Level 3 BTEC in Sport Performance and Excellence, a Cambridge Technical in ICT, a BTEC in CGI and Game Design, BTEC in Construction, and a Level 2 Vocational in Hairdressing.

Others

The Arnewood School also offers classes for a Level 2 Cutting Course for Adults, and a Level 3 course for Creative Cutting Techniques.

== Notable Students ==
- Alex Elmslie - YouTuber
- Belle Delphine - Instagrammer
- Hannah Phillips - YouTuber
