= Bashley, Hampshire =

Coordinates: 50.7738°N 1.6610°W

Bashley
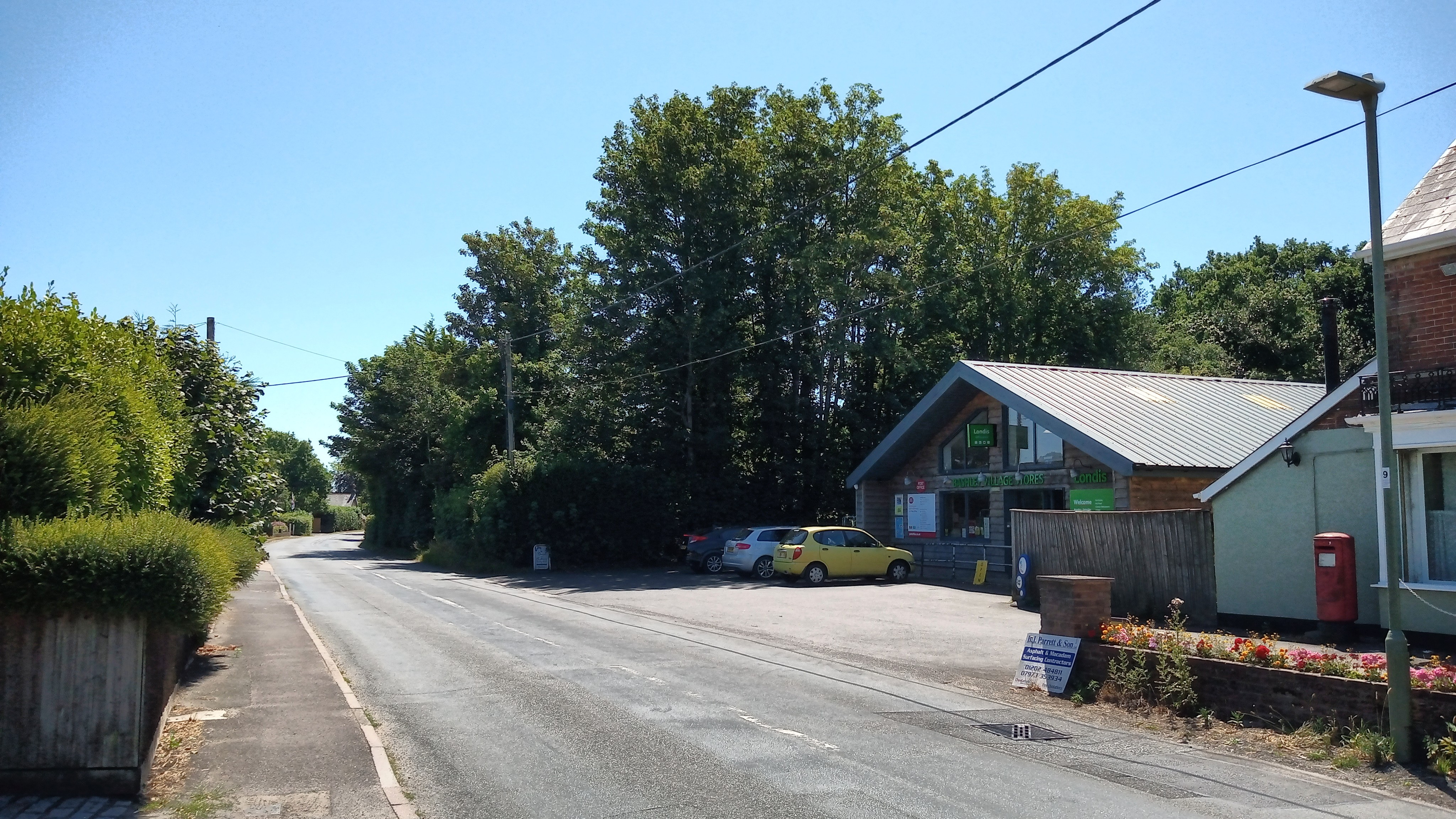
- Bashley Village Stores

- Location within Hampshire
- Population: 731 (2011)
- OS grid reference: SZ240973
- Civil parish: New Milton
- District: New Forest
- Shire county: Hampshire
- Region: South East
- Country: England
- Sovereign state: United Kingdom
- Post town: New Milton
- Postcode district: BH25
- Dialling code: 01425
- Police: Hampshire and Isle of Wight
- Fire: Hampshire and Isle of Wight
- Ambulance: South Central
- UK Parliament: New Forest West

Bashley is a chapelry in the New Forest in the south west of Hampshire, England. It takes up the north of New Milton civil parish of a type having a town council, and is a semi-rural community in New Forest District, to which it contributes about a quarter of the population of the ward of the same name. Bashley begins 2 miles (3 km) inland from the Solent. Most of its modest population is in its holiday park which has a chain-based convenience shop. Bashley has two garden centres, both football and cricket clubs, a few guesthouses, two riding schools/centres, a post office/store and a petrol station. Within the forest commons across cattle grids in its former hamlet of Wootton which has a large listed building pub-restaurant, once a drovers' retreat.

== History ==
The history of Bashley can be traced to the Anglo-Saxon period. The earliest mention of Bashley is recorded in a charter belonging to Christchurch Priory where reference is made to an estate called Bagesluceleia for the year 1053. The name means "wood/clearing of Baegloc." This uncommon name was borne by an 8th-century abbot.

In the time of the Domesday Book, 1086, the settlement was known as Bailocheslei, and was held in chief by Alsi the priest, who held it from the king. Alsi was entitled to the profits of "half a mill" amounting to 3 shillings. It was part of the Edgegate hundred.

Soon afterwards Bashley was acquired by Christchurch Priory. A chapel is recorded in Bashley as early as the 13th century. Until the Dissolution of the monasteries under Henry VIII, Bashley belonged to the Priory, although it was usually administered as part of the priory's Somerford estate. In 1262 William Boscher had held land in Bashley from Christchurch Manor, and in 1315 Robert Boscher died possessed of Bashley Manor. The priory still owned part of the original estate in 1384, when it received a grant of free warren there. This land seems to have been absorbed into their manor of Somerford; it is included in an account of the manor in 1628, and sixty years later there is mention of a copse at Bashley belonging to the manor. Bashley Common was inclosed in 1817.

Ossemsley Manor changed hands a few times during the 19th century before being rebuilt in 1908 for Sir Alfred Cooper (1846-1915).

The church of Saint John the Baptist was built 1909-1910 for £300 and is a daughter church of St. Mary Magdalene in New Milton. A corrugated church hall was erected shortly afterwards.

== Surroundings ==
At the north end of the village is the hamlet of Wootton. The pub at Wootton is The Rising Sun, which has been on its present site for over two hundred years. To the east of Bashley flows the Danes Stream. The name derives from the Saxon word "denu", meaning "stream". Victorian romantics were so convinced that there must have been a battle involving the Danes (Vikings) here, that old Ordnance Survey maps actually marked a site of a battle at Bashley. To the west of Bashley is a set of farmsteads and smallholdings, Ossemsley.

== Sports and events ==
In 1945 after World War II funds were raised towards a village hall and sports ground. The popular annual flower show and fete was introduced. 3.5 acres (1.4 ha) were purchased in 1948 for £1000 "to enhance the life of the inhabitants of Bashley," and a lease was granted to Bashley Football Club to use the grounds. Bashley Football Club reached the Second Round proper of the FA Cup in the 1994–95 season, and were hosts to Swansea City to whom they narrowly lost 1–0. Bashley Village Hall is also home to a popular flower show held annually.

An ex Ministry of Works hut, purchased for £150, was delivered in January 1950 as a first community hall. The hall was rebuilt in 1987, including the addition of annual events attracting a wider audience: Bashley Horse Show and Bashley Carnival.

In 1979 Bashley (Rydal) Cricket Club moved to its present ground at Bashley, having previously played cricket in the Bournemouth area.
