= New Milton =

Market town in Hampshire, England

Coordinates: 50.76°N 1.65°W

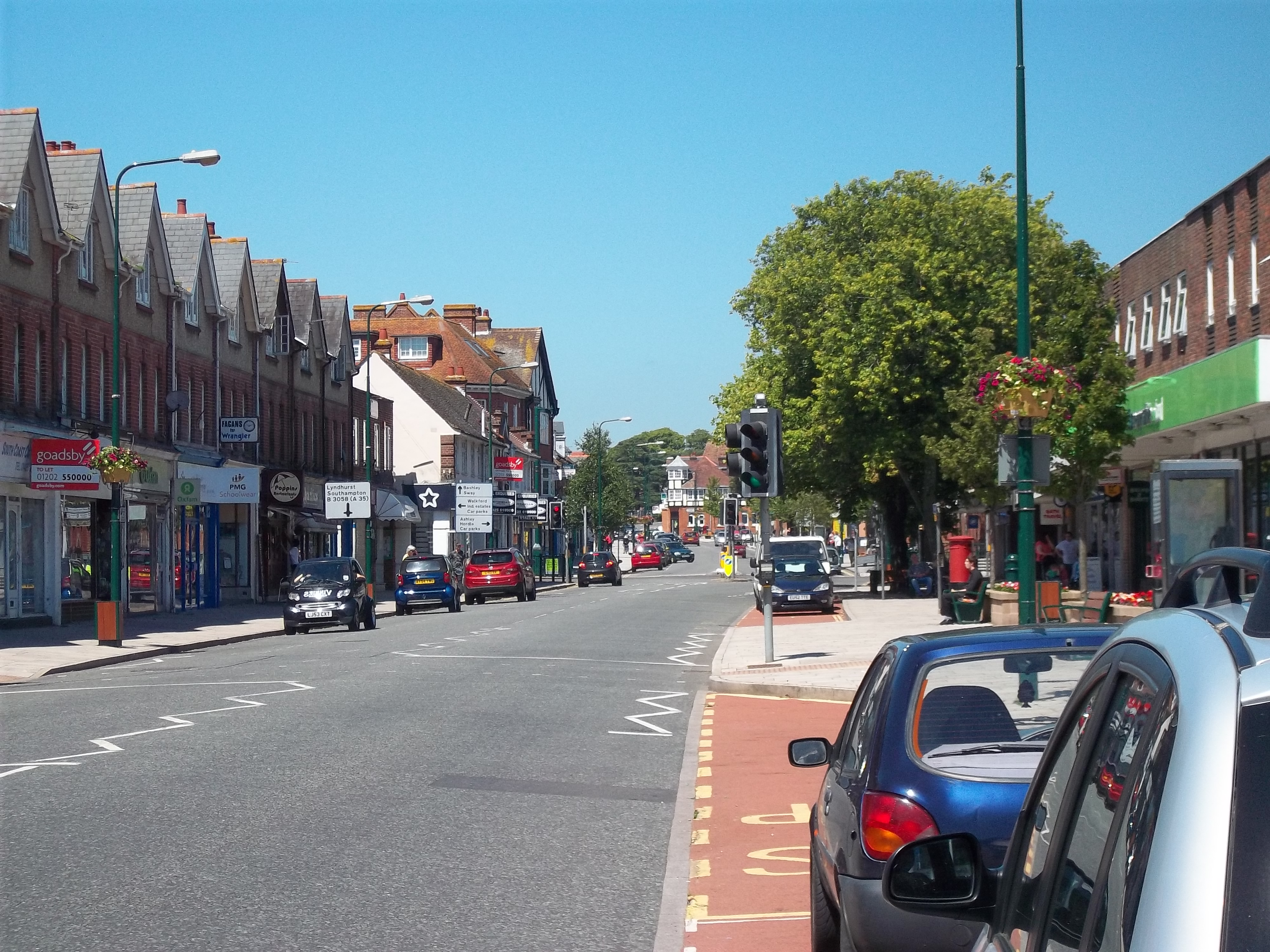
- New Milton town centre

- Location within Hampshire
- Interactive map of New Milton
- Population: 25,546 (civil parish, 2021)
- OS grid reference: SZ244948
- Civil parish: New Milton
- District: New Forest
- Shire county: Hampshire
- Region: South East
- Country: England
- Sovereign state: United Kingdom
- Post town: New Milton
- Postcode district: BH25
- Dialling code: 01425
- Police: Hampshire and Isle of Wight
- Fire: Hampshire and Isle of Wight
- Ambulance: South Central
- UK Parliament: New Forest West

New Milton is a market town and civil parish in the New Forest district, in southwest Hampshire, England. To the north is in the New Forest and to the south the coast at Barton on Sea. The town is equidistant between Lymington and Christchurch, 6 miles (9.7 km) away.

The parish encompasses Old Milton, Barton on Sea, Ashley, Bashley, and Wootton. It is recorded as having a population of 25,546 in the 2021 census, of which 11,870 live in New Milton town itself.

== History ==
New Milton dates back to Anglo-Saxon times.

=== Milton ===
The manor of ("Mildeltune") is listed in the Domesday Book of 1086 and literally means "Middle farm." It was part of the lands belonging to Hugh de Port, and the estate was held from him by William Chernet. The Chernet family maintained possession of Milton into the 13th century, although lesser families were managing the estate on their behalf. The most important of these were the Chaucombe (or Chalcombe) family, who were probably the first people to build a church in Milton in the mid 13th century. In 1303, Thomas de Chaucombe was given permission to hold a weekly market on Tuesdays at Milton, as well as an annual fair on the feast day of Mary Magdalene, but this attempt to create a market town seems to have failed.

From 1365 to 1565, the manor was in the possession of the Tyrrell family. The manor passed through various hands in subsequent centuries. The last significant owners were the Bursey family in the 19th century, and in the 1890s the remaining lands of the estate were subdivided and sold. In close proximity to Milton was the manor of Fernhill. In the Domesday book, it was held by Nigel from Roger de Montgomerie, 1st Earl of Shrewsbury. In the 15th century, John Fromond, the owner of this scattered estate, willed the lands to Winchester College, in whose hands the estate remained down to the 19th century. Another estate called "Gore" appeared by the 15th century, and still survives (partially) as a farm to the west of the town.

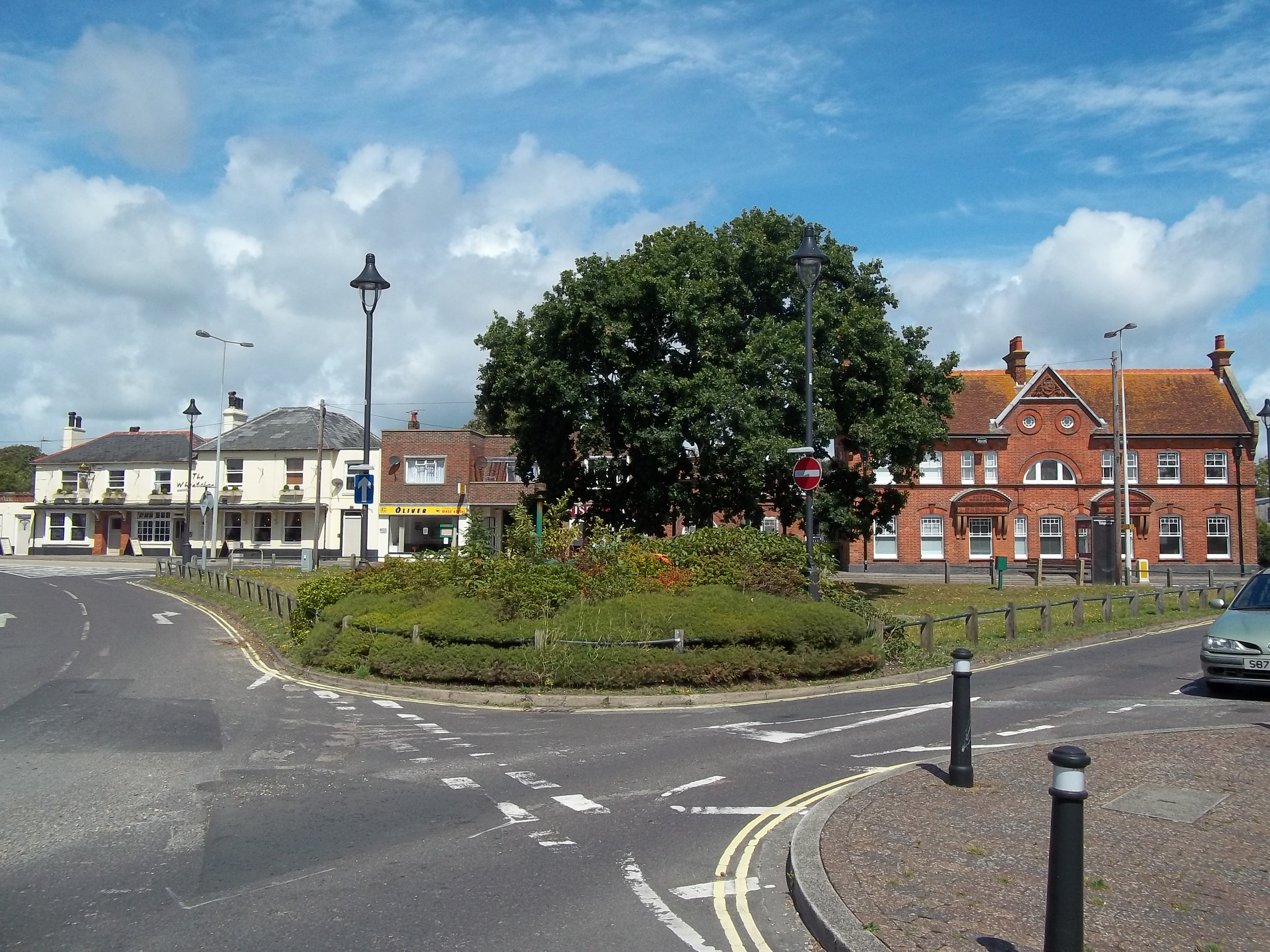
Remnant of the village green in Old Milton

The traditional village centre of Milton was just south of the church. Up to the 1960s, moated earthworks were still visible next to the road known as Moat Lane. Excavations of these earthworks in 1956 revealed a series of peasant enclosures and hut remains dating from the 9th to the 12th century, but no evidence of a manorial farmstead was found. The parish church of Milton is dedicated to Mary Magdalene and consists of a chancel with vestry, a nave and a western tower. The medieval church was pulled down and replaced around 1830, although the tower is of an earlier 17th century date. In 1835, a Church of England National School was founded on an island of land near the village green, where children were taught until just after World War I. In 1881, the population of the entire Milton parish was only 1489 people, and Milton was still a small village. The location of the village on the main Christchurch to Lymington road (now the A337) meant that there were two coaching inns - The Wheatsheaf and The George - the former of which is still operating.

=== New Milton ===
In March 1888 New Milton railway station opened, and it is still in operation today. A new town developed, which expanded rapidly with the coming of the railway and the name New Milton was used for the first time and can originally be traced back to the Post Office that stood opposite the railway station. In 1895, the owner of the Post Office, Emma Newhook, commissioned a sign, which read - "New Milton Sub Post Office" to differentiate it from the post office in Old Milton. This was officially accepted in 1896, and so the name New Milton caught on. Much of the local farmland has been developed, first in the 1960s for commuter housing and again in the 1970s for small industrial/trade units. There is a mix of housing from cottages on the outskirts to more modern, urban housing in the central area. Milton village subsequently became known as Old Milton (renamed on Ordnance Survey maps by 1970) and lies between New Milton and Barton on Sea.

There are few notable architectural points of interest in the local area. However, a distinctive row of Coast Guard Cottages is to be found in Barton Lane, Barton on Sea; these were built at the end of the nineteenth century by the Government of the day to house armed guards to try to stop the smuggling that was rife at the time. The Barton on Sea-to-Mudeford coastline was renowned for smuggling with many of the offshore seaways and routes to shore being named after well known local smuggling families. It was in this context that Frederick Marryat, author of The Children of the New Forest, was sent on patrol here as a young naval lieutenant in 1821, to watch over traffic from the sheltered Christchurch Bay area. Britain's first reinforced concrete bridge was built in 1901 just outside New Milton at Chewton. There was an earlier experiment in building with this material in its unreinforced form at Sway (Sway Tower). Also built in 1900 was the Tudor style water tower, in Osborne Road. It has a staircase, a turret, slit windows and battlements. It is an orange-red colour, from locally cut and finished bricks.

The Roman Catholic church of Our Lady of Lourdes was completed in 1927 and expanded in 1951.

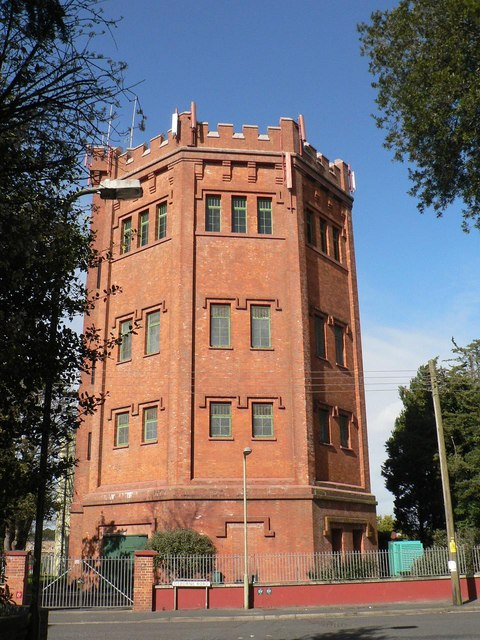
New Milton water tower

On 23 August 1940, 8 August 1942 and 22 January 1943 bombing raids were carried out upon New Milton by the German Luftwaffe. The town's water tower was suggested as the target. During the Second World War, New Milton housed evacuees and was a transit station for soldiers going to the battlefields. It also had an army hospital which co-served unwell American airmen based at the nearby airfields at Lymington and Holmsley.

The Memorial Centre in Whitefield Road commemorates those who died in the raids, as well as townspeople who have died more recently. Bricks can be purchased for inscription and insertion into the wall of the Memorial Room, which stands to the left of the front door and contains mementos saved from the original building, which was destroyed by fire in the 1970s.

== Barton on Sea ==
Once a coastal village, Barton on Sea is today in the civil parish. During the First World War, Barton Court Hotel became a convalescent home for Indian servicemen and this is commemorated by an obelisk in the village.

While Barton is a common English place-name, the etymology of Barton-on-Sea is unique. It means "Beorma's Farm", and appears twice in the Domesday Book, as Bermintune and as Burmintune.

The coast at Barton on Sea is well known for its geological content, being home to many fossils in the Barton geological beds. The cliff tops are home to a golf course. A cliff-top path runs between Barton and the village of Milford on Sea. From there, the Solent Way stretches to Emsworth, on the West Sussex border.

== Ashley ==
To the east of New Milton is the village of Ashley, which also has a history dating back to the Domesday Book. Today Ashley is effectively a suburb of New Milton, albeit with its own shops, churches, and primary schools. In the late 15th century, the manor of Ashley was joined with part of another manor northeast of the parish called Arnewood, and the combined estate became known as Ashley Arnewood. The estate of Ashley Arnewood has long since disappeared, but the name Arnewood still lives on in the name of New Milton's secondary school (The Arnewood School), and the name of one of the health centres.

== Activities ==
Tourist attractions include the Sammy Miller Motorcycle Museum on the corner of Stem Lane, a prominent collection of motorcycles and accompanying memorabilia.

The Forest Arts Centre is at the end of Old Milton Road. It comprises several exhibition and activity rooms, a bar area and the main 150-seat studio theatre. It hosts a wide range of performances, including multi-genre music, theatre, comedy, dance, films, literature - as well as putting on an array of activities and workshops for people in the community of all ages.

The Memorial Centre also hosts various activities, including painting, dancing, indoor bowls, yoga, model car racing, and the Decorative and Fine Arts Society. It contains a large function rooms, seating 350, with a raised stage. It also has two further rooms for hire upstairs, and a platform lift for disabled access. The 2010s formed Friends group is promoting involvement of local schools and businesses and is currently refurbishing the centre to make it more attractive to hirers.

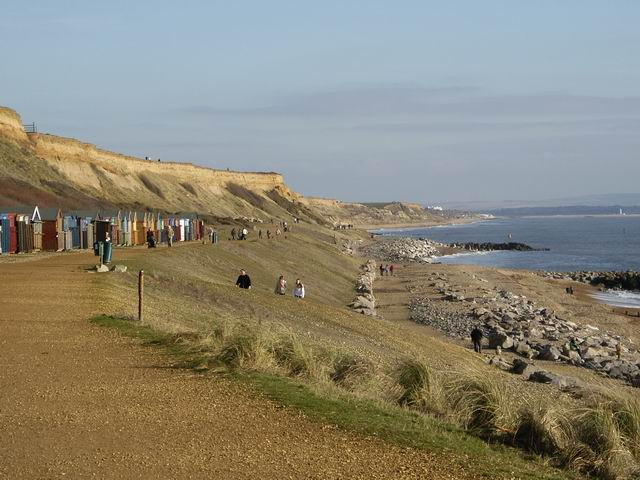
Cliffs and beach at Barton on Sea

== Politics and administration ==
=== Hampshire County Council ===
For elections to the county council, New Milton is an electoral division, represented by one councillor. Elections are held four-yearly, last on Thursday 4 May 2017.

2017 New Milton local election
Party	Candidate	Votes	%	±%
Labour	Caroline Hexter	435	9%	
Conservative	Mel Kendal	3226	66%	
Liberal Democrats	Mark William Clark	467	10%	
Pirate	Des Hjerling	108	2%	
UKIP	Paul Bailey	647	13%	
Spoilt Ballots		7		
Majority		2579	52.8%	
Turnout		4883	35%	
Conservative hold		Swing		

=== New Forest District Council ===
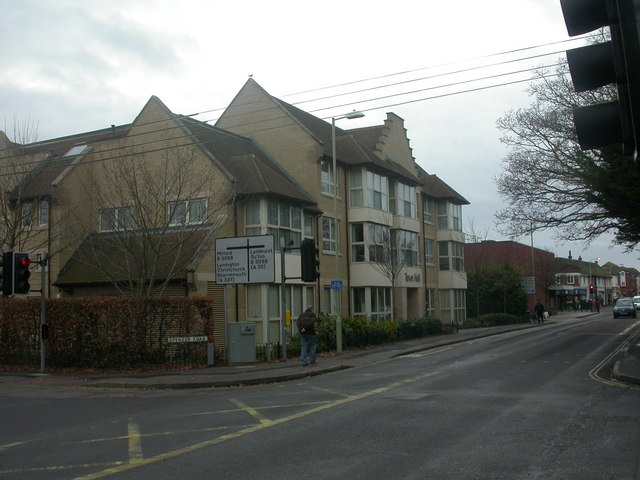
New Milton Town Hall

The town, including Ashley and Barton-on-Sea, splits into five wards, imprecisely named with respect to history so as to ensure equal electorate: Bashley (mostly parts of New Milton), Fernhill, Milton, Barton and Becton. New Milton Town Council is based at New Milton Town Hall.

== Demographics ==
New Milton civil parish recorded a population of 25,546 people in 11,864 households at the 2021 census. The Office for National Statistics defined three "built-up areas" in the parish, New Milton with a population of 11,870; Ashley (including part of the neighbouring parish of Hordle) with 7,725; and Barton on Sea with 6,760.

In 2011, ONS defined a different New Milton built-up area, which included Ashley but excluded Barton on Sea and outlying hamlets, with a population of 19,969.

Census population of New Milton parish
Census	Population	Female	Male	Households	Source
2001	23,753	12,815	10,938	10,982	
2011	25,717	13,780	11,937	11,916	
2021	25,546	13,538	12,008	11,864	

== Sport and leisure ==
New Milton has a Non-League football club New Milton Town F.C., which plays at Fawcett's Field.

The town's leisure amenities include: a park with children's play area, a skate park and full-size basketball court, Fawcett playing fields, a community centre, tennis courts, a bowls club, a library and a sports centre, including swimming pool, sauna, gym, squash courts and multi-activity sports hall. Being near the New Forest, the town popular for walking, hiking, cycling and riding. Holiday parks are an important employment source, numerous in the surrounding area.

== Media ==
Local news and television programmes is provided by BBC South and ITV Meridian. Television signals are received from the Rowridge TV transmitter. Local radio stations are BBC Radio Solent, Heart South, Nation Radio South Coast, Easy Radio South Coast and Greatest Hits Radio South. The town is served by the local newspaper, New Milton Advertiser which publishes Saturdays.

== Transport ==
New Milton railway station is located on the South West Main Line from London Waterloo to Weymouth.

Local bus routes are operated by morebus, with the most frequent being the X1 and X2 services. The morebus 119 service runs from New Milton to Lymington via Pennington, Everton and Hordle

== Education ==
The local state schools are

- New Milton Infant School
- New Milton Junior School
- Ashley Infant School
- Ashley Junior School
- The Eaglewood School
- The Arnewood School

There is also a selection of independent schools including

- Ballard School

Around New Milton, sixth form colleges include

- Brockenhurst College
- Totton College.
- Arnewood Sixth Form

== Notable residents ==
- Frederick Marryat lived at his brother's house (now the Chewton Glen Hotel) while writing much of The Children of the New Forest.
- Neil Moss, the AFC Bournemouth goalkeeper born in the town.
- Rumer, singer lived and performed her first gig in the town.
- Alice Tai, award-winning Paralympic gold-medal swimmer, grew up in the town.
- Ian Wooldridge, the sports writer, was born in New Milton.

== Twin town ==
- Canteleu in France
