= 2016 Conservative Party leadership election =

British leadership election

- 5–11 July 2016
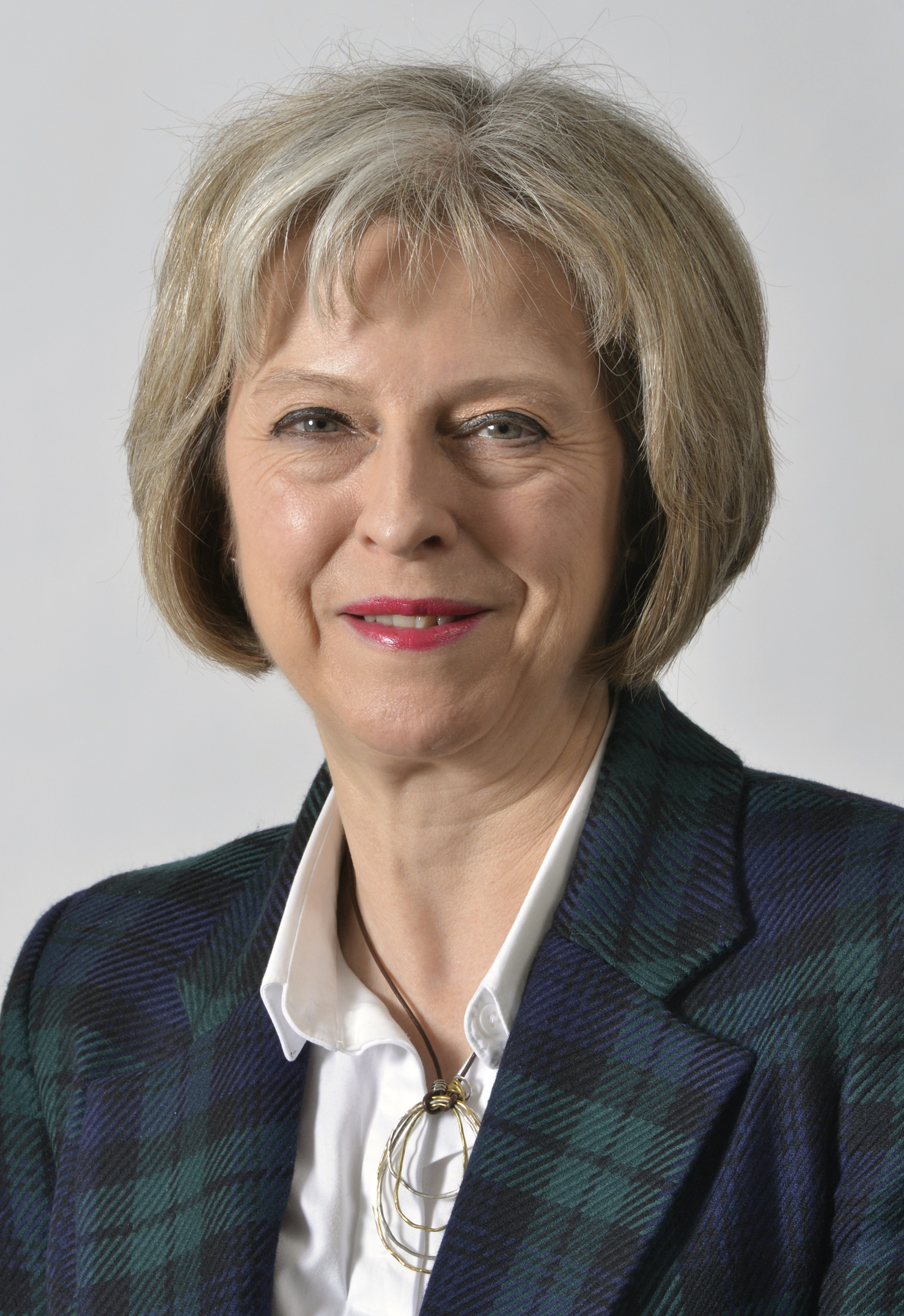

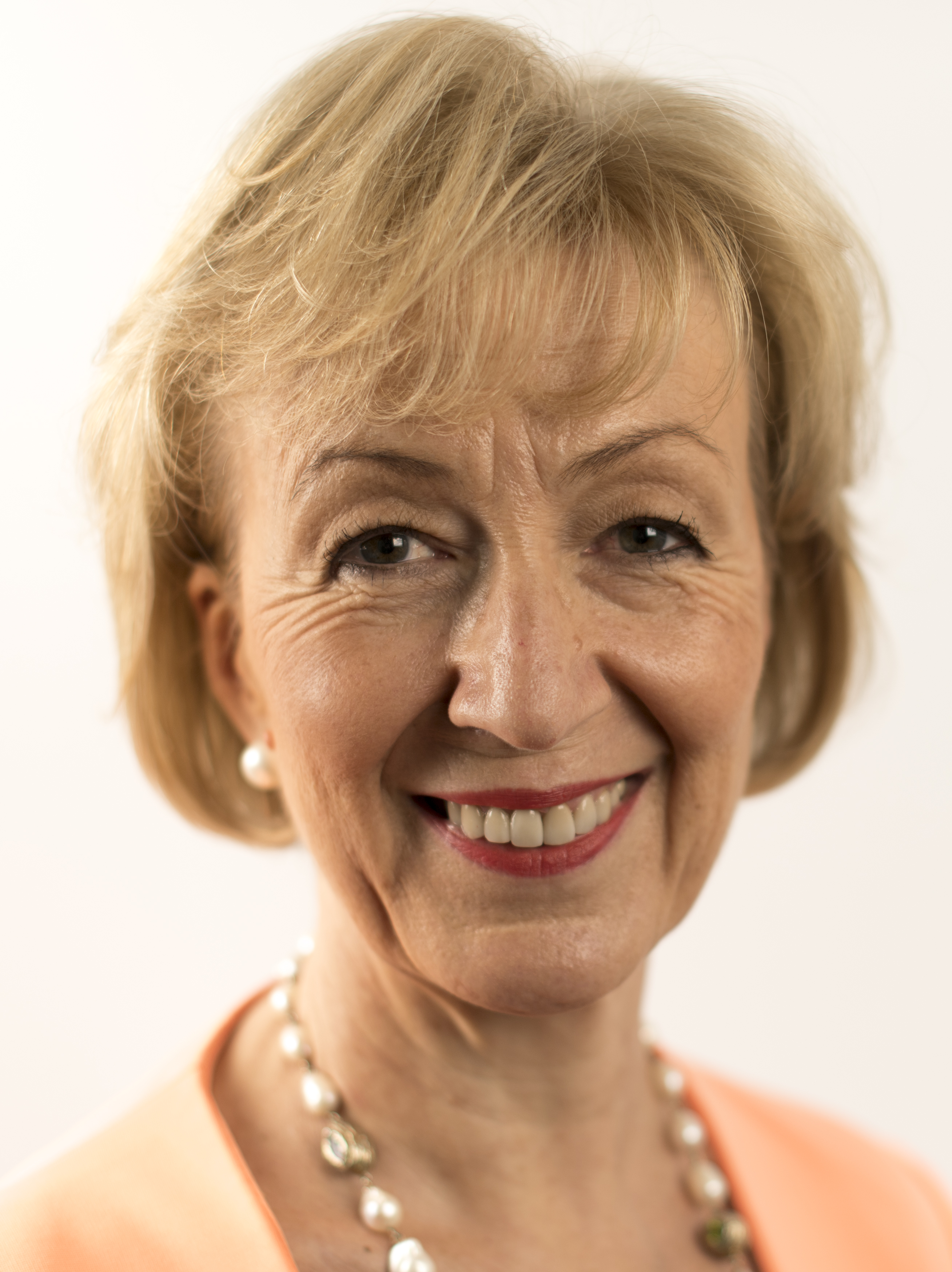

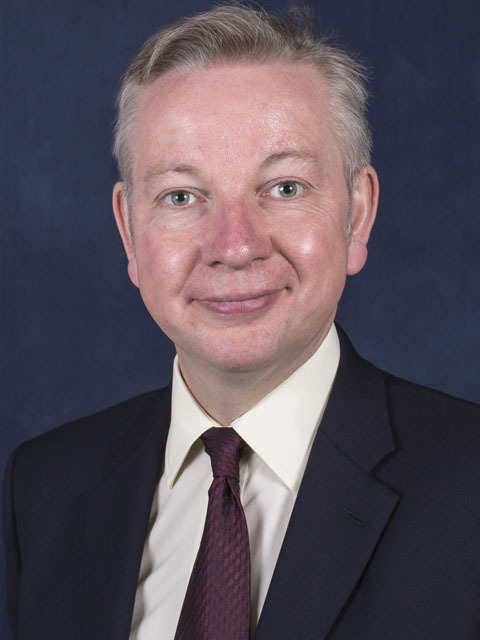

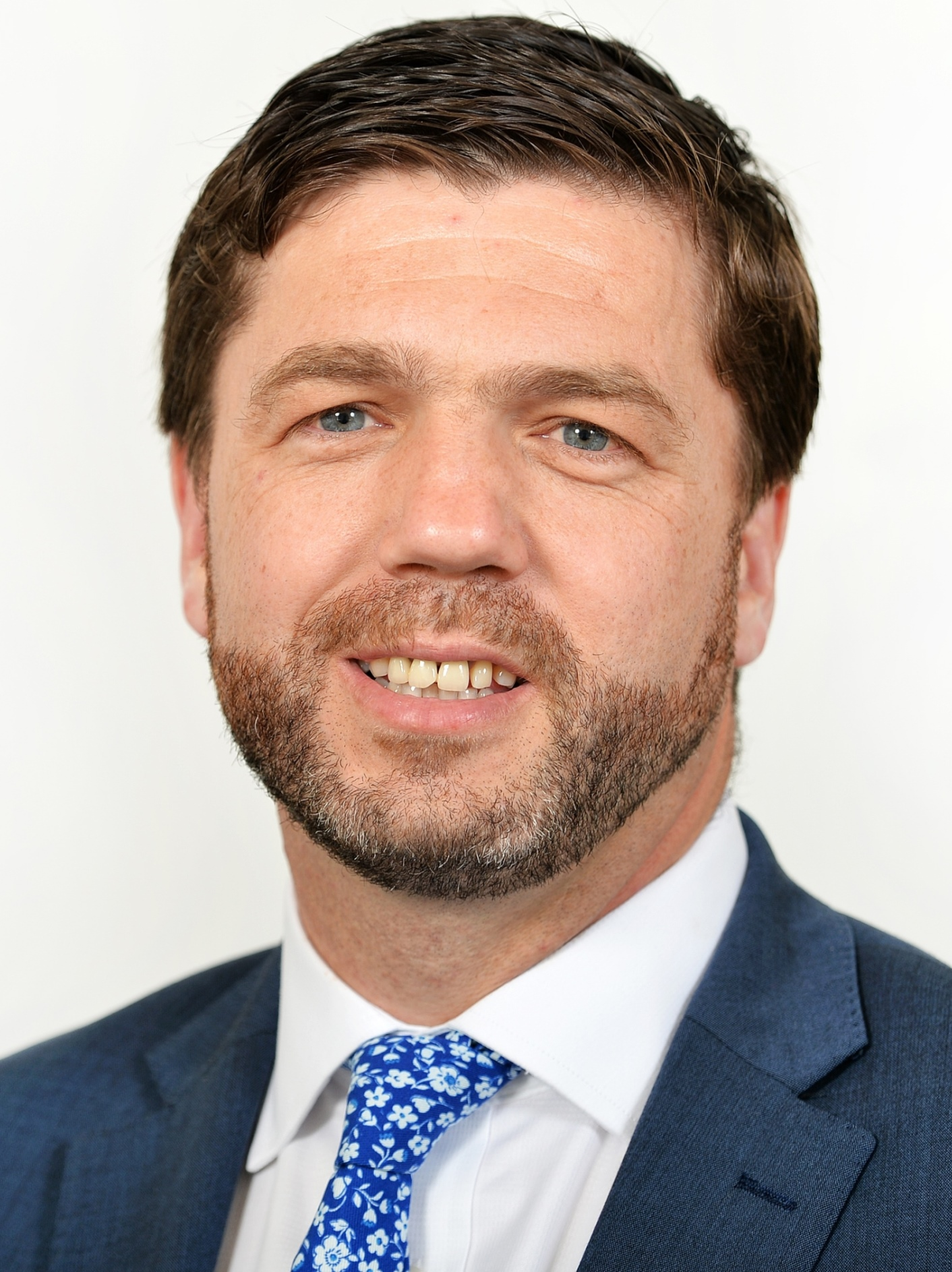

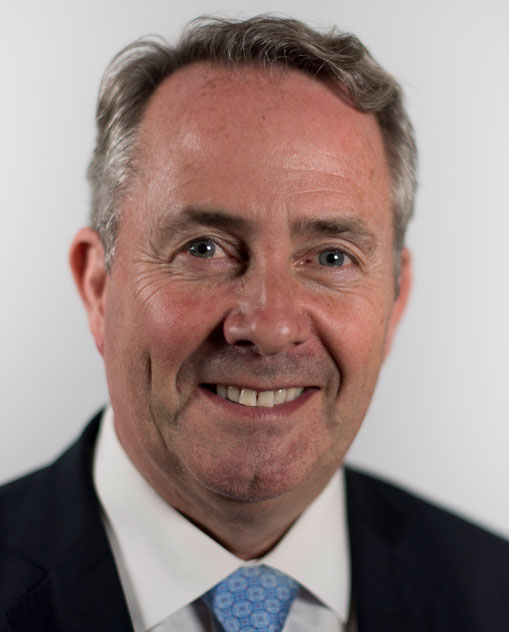
Candidate	Theresa May	Andrea Leadsom	Michael Gove
First ballot	165 (50.2%)	66 (20.1%)	48 (14.6%)
Second ballot	199 (60.5%)	84 (25.5%)	46 (14.0%)
Members' vote	Unopposed	Withdrew	Eliminated
Candidate	Stephen Crabb	Liam Fox
First ballot	34 (10.3%)	16 (4.9%)
Second ballot	Withdrew	Eliminated
Members' vote	Withdrew	Eliminated
Leader before election
David Cameron
Elected Leader
Theresa May

The 2016 Conservative Party leadership election was held due to Prime Minister David Cameron's resignation as party leader. He had resigned after losing the national referendum to leave the European Union. Cameron, who supported Britain's continued membership of the EU, announced his resignation on 24 June, saying that he would step down by October. Theresa May won the contest on 11 July 2016, after the withdrawal of Andrea Leadsom left her as the sole candidate.

Conservative members of Parliament had voted initially in a series of ballots to determine which two candidates would go forward to a nationwide ballot of Conservative Party members for the final decision. Five Conservative MPs put themselves forward as candidates: Justice Secretary Michael Gove, Work and Pensions Secretary Stephen Crabb, former Defence Secretary Liam Fox, Minister of State for Energy and Climate Change Andrea Leadsom, and Home Secretary Theresa May. Former Mayor of London Boris Johnson, seen as the front runner by political analysts, chose not to run after Gove withdrew his backing and announced his own candidacy.

In the first-round ballot, May, gaining the support of half of Conservative MPs, was placed first with Leadsom in second place. Fox was eliminated on the first ballot; Crabb withdrew later that day. Gove was eliminated in the second round of voting. Before the Conservative Party members were due to cast their votes, Leadsom withdrew from the contest on 11 July. May was appointed party leader later that day, and prime minister on 13 July. She appointed Boris Johnson, Fox and Leadsom to her Cabinet, respectively as Foreign Secretary, international trade secretary, and environment secretary.

If not for Leadsom's withdrawal, Conservative Party members would have directly elected a new prime minister for the first time; this is what happened in the next Conservative leadership election in 2019.

== Background ==
During the 2015 general election campaign, David Cameron, then leader of the Conservative Party and prime minister, announced that he would not seek a third term; he was therefore expected to stand down before the following general election – at that time, expected to occur in 2020 – although he spoke of serving a full term.

Following a manifesto commitment, Cameron and the Conservative Party introduced legislation for a referendum on the UK's membership of the European Union, which was held on 23 June 2016. Cameron and the Government supported a Remain vote, although the Conservative Party was officially neutral in the campaign and many Conservative politicians, including some Cabinet members, campaigned to Leave. There was speculation during the campaign as to whether Cameron would resign if Leave won, but on the day of the referendum, both Leave- and Remain-supporting Conservatives called for him to stay whatever the result.

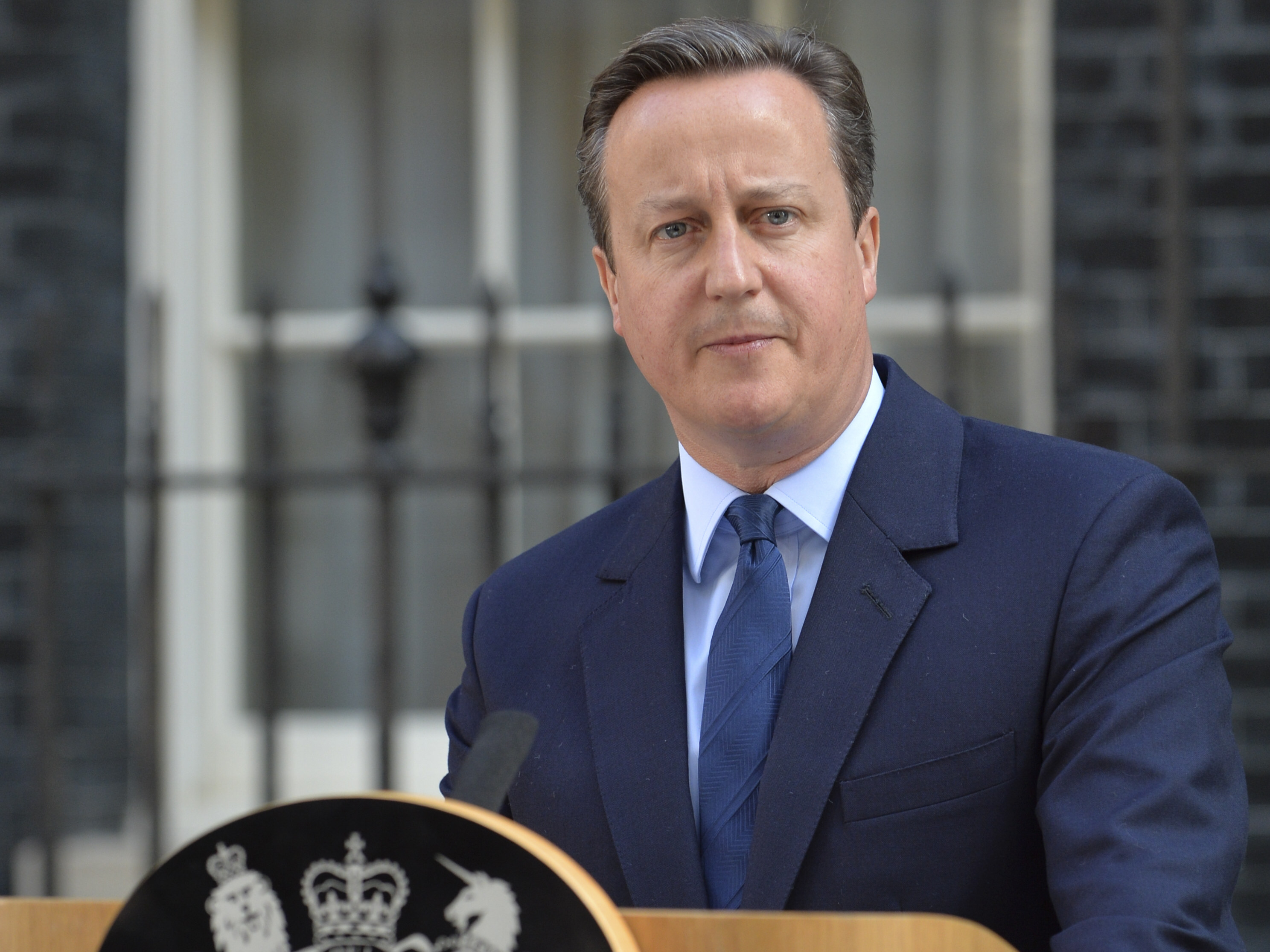
Cameron announces his pending resignation outside 10 Downing Street on 24 June; he left office on 13 July

A Leave win was announced on the morning of 24 June 2016, and Cameron announced shortly afterward that he would be stepping down. He said that he would continue in post while the leadership election was ongoing, with the new leader to be in place in time for the party conference in October. However, the way in which events unfolded resulted in his much earlier departure.

The campaign was framed by whether candidates had supported Remain or Leave; initial speculation by some analysts was that a Leave supporter would be more likely to win. Based on media speculation, the front runners on 29 June were Boris Johnson (Leave) and Theresa May (Remain), with Johnson the early favorite. Johnson's candidacy was expected to be supported by Michael Gove, the two having worked together for Leave through the referendum campaign, as well as by Andrea Leadsom. However, earlier that week, May was leading by a narrow margin in opinion polls commissioned by The Times and by The Independent.

Gove, previously seen as a key ally of the Johnson campaign, announced his own candidacy three hours before nominations closed, stating that he had reluctantly come to the conclusion that Johnson could not "provide the leadership or build the team for the task ahead". Johnson subsequently withdrew from the leadership race. The Telegraph stated that Gove's actions in undermining Johnson's leadership aspirations constituted "the most spectacular political assassination in a generation". Gove's move was compared to the betrayals of fiction with, for example, Johnson's father, Stanley Johnson, quoting "Et tu, Brute?". Some of Johnson's allies subsequently began shifting their support to May, because they perceived a "systematic and calculated plot" by Gove to remove their candidate from the race.

By 5 July 2016, Gove was in a distant third place in the leadership race based on the number of endorsements received from other MPs. He was eliminated in the second MPs' ballot.

A post-contest analysis in The Daily Telegraph noted that the £275,000 contributions to Theresa May's campaign "dwarfed her rivals", and Cameron's original honours list contained the names of two major Conservative party donors who supported her campaign.

== Campaign and key issues ==
The initial days of the campaign remained overshadowed by the fallout from Gove's entry into the race and Johnson's departure. May gathered the most support from MPs early on. Gavin Williamson – later to be appointed Chief Whip by May – was her parliamentary campaign manager and responsible for rallying this support, together with a small group of MPs including Julian Smith, Kris Hopkins, Simon Kirby, Karen Bradley and George Hollingbery. In the initial days of the campaign, Leadsom said that she would not rule out involving Nigel Farage, then the leader of the UK Independence Party (UKIP), in Brexit negotiations; the May campaign criticised Leadsom for claimed UKIP links. Leadsom had approached the Johnson campaign with a proposed deal not to run in exchange for being made one of his top three ministers. Johnson agreed to the deal, but was too late in communicating the decision, and Leadsom chose to run for leader.

All five candidates for the Conservative leadership said that they would not call an early general election, relying instead on the Conservative mandate secured at the 2015 election. The five candidates also rejected the idea of calling a second referendum on British withdrawal from the EU, pledging to take the UK out of the Union, although on different timeframes.

Among the key issues that emerged during the Conservative leadership campaign were:

- The status of EU citizens living in the UK. The government stated following the EU referendum that the long-term status of EU nationals living in the UK and UK nationals living elsewhere in the EU would be a question for the next government, with the current government saying only that there would be "no immediate change" to EU nationals' status. May suggested that the status of EU citizens living in the UK could be part of exit negotiations; the other four Conservative leadership candidates opposed this notion, saying that EU nationals living in the UK should not be "negotiating chips" and pledging to allow EU nationals to remain in the country if chosen as prime minister.
- When to trigger Article 50 of the Treaty on European Union, formally beginning the process of withdrawal from the European Union by the UK. May and Gove both stated that they would not invoke Article 50 before 2017. Leadsom called for a quick invocation of Article 50 and short negotiations, although she did not put forward a specific timeframe. Fox put forward a specific date, saying: "I would like to see us leaving the EU on January 1, 2019. That means we will have to activate the Article 50 process by the end of this year."
- What level of access to the European single market Britain should seek, and the future of migration policy and the free movement of EU nationals in the UK. Fox, the most right-wing of the five candidates, said that he only supported membership in the single market if the UK was allowed to completely opt-out of the free movement of people, which is viewed as extremely unlikely. Gove and Leadsom took a tough line of free movement, with Gove pledging to "end free movement [and] introduce an Australian-style points-based system for immigration" and Leadsom pledging that free movement "will end" without mentioning the single market. Crabb took what The Week described as "the most pro-single market stance" of the candidates, saying it was "vital" for the UK to have "as close an economic relationship with the EU as we have now" while also speaking of "controlling" immigration, signalling some willingness to compromise with the EU. May stated that it was her "priority to allow British companies to trade with the single market in goods and services" but said that she would not accept a deal "that involves accepting the free movement of people as it has worked hitherto"—also signalling willingness to some future compromise deal with the EU. Fox also pledged to reduce net migration to the tens of thousands, while Leadsom, Crabb and Gove did not specifically pledged to do so; May has said: "I think net migration in the tens of thousands is sustainable, but it is going to take time."
- Whether to approve the construction of a third runway at Heathrow Airport, a decision which was delayed to at least October 2016 in the wake of the Brexit referendum vote and the Conservative leadership campaign. Boris Johnson, who opted not to run, was a staunch opponent of the proposal; May and Gove, whose constituencies are near Heathrow, have dealt with noise complaints in the past but did not publicly take a stand on a third runway during the leadership campaign. Crabb, by contrast, said during the campaign that he was "a strong supporter of a third runway" at the airport to boost the economy.

An editorial in The Guardian noted that the Brexit-dominated leadership campaign presented a danger that the next prime minister would be chosen on this basis at a time when several major domestic issues would also demand the prime minister's attention, such as the disputes between the government and unions representing teachers and junior doctors.

An interview with Leadsom in The Times in early July created some controversy. The article quoted Leadsom as saying that motherhood gave her a better political perspective than May — who is childless — although Leadsom protested the article misrepresented her views. She later apologised to May. There was also controversy about claimed inaccuracies in Leadsom's CV. Meanwhile, Crabb, after his candidacy had ended, was reported to have been sexting a woman despite being married and stressing family values in his campaign.

Leadsom withdrew from the contest on 11 July, arguing that May should become leader promptly.

== Election procedure ==
The election process for selecting the leader of the Conservative Party is overseen by the Conservative 1922 Committee, although election procedures are approved by the Board of the Conservative Party. Nominations for the leadership are invited by the Chairman of the 1922 Committee (Graham Brady at the time), acting as Returning Officer for all stages of the election. Candidates must be proposed and seconded in writing, with names of the proposers and seconders being published. When nominations close, a list of valid nominations is published. If there is only one valid nomination, that person is declared elected. If only two valid nominations are received, both names go forward to the general membership of the Party. If more than two nominations are received, a ballot is held within the Parliamentary Party on the Tuesday immediately following the closing date for nominations. An exhaustive ballot system is used to select two candidates to go forward to the general membership of the Party.

A ballot paper is produced and issued to all Conservative Members in the House of Commons, who indicate one choice from the candidates listed. Proxy votes are possible. The ballot is conducted in secret. If there are three candidates in the first ballot, the two who receive the most votes go forward to the general membership. If there are more than three, the candidate receiving the fewest votes is eliminated and a second ballot, under the same rules, is held the following Thursday. If there are no more than three candidates in the second ballot, the two receiving the most votes go forward to the general membership. If a third ballot is required, it is held the following Tuesday. This process is repeated as often as necessary, on alternate Tuesdays and Thursdays. When a ballot with only three candidates is reached, the two candidates who receive the highest number of votes go forward to the general membership. Candidates may withdraw their names at any time, "up to 24 hours of the opening of the ballot", but no new nominations will be accepted after the first ballot.

The two candidates selected by the Parliamentary Party are then put to the full membership of the Party (specifically, "all the members of the Conservative Party in good standing who have been members for not less than three months prior to the date of the announcement of the Vote of Confidence") in a postal ballot. Each Party member, on a "one member, one vote" basis, may vote for their preferred candidate. It is not explicitly stated in the rules from when the three months applies, in the eventuality of the leader resigning, but Rule 5 in the "Rules for the Election of the Leader" (which appears as Schedule 2 to the Constitution of the Conservative Party) gives this as "immediately prior to the close of the ballot for the election of the Leader". The Chairman of the 1922 Committee consults with the Board of the Conservative Party to agree the closing date for the ballot, which will be "as soon as practicable" after the date of the last ballot in the Parliamentary Party. The chairman, as returning officer, shall agree with the Board who is responsible, under his direction, for the receipt and counting of the votes, and the chairman announces the results "as soon as practicable" to a meeting of the Parliamentary Party and representatives of the Conservative Party.

Should only a single candidate be nominated, or all but one candidate be eliminated or withdraw before the scheduled end of the election (set in this instance as 9 September 2016), that single (or remaining) candidate is elected effectively unopposed without—if applicable—the votes of the party membership being issued (or counted if the ballot papers have already been issued).

== Results ==
The first ballot of MPs was held on 5 July. The results were announced at 18:30 by 1922 Committee chairman Graham Brady. May placed first, far ahead of her closest rival Leadsom. Fifth-placed candidate Fox was knocked out of the race, and Crabb withdrew following scandalous revelations about his private life; both endorsed May. Gove, Leadsom and May went through to the second ballot held on 7 July. May again was the clear winner, with Leadsom beating Gove, which meant that May and Leadsom went through to the members' ballot, the result of which was due to be announced on 9 September.

However, on 11 July, Leadsom withdrew from the race, saying it is in the "best interests of the country", leaving May as the only candidate. Conservative MP and Chairman of the 1922 Committee, Graham Brady, announced that May would be confirmed as Conservative Party leader as soon as the party's board had been consulted. She was confirmed as leader; David Cameron tendered his resignation as prime minister on 13 July, with May accepting the Queen's invitation to succeed him shortly afterwards. Having been appointed prime minister, she entered 10 Downing Street with a speech emphasising the term Unionist in the name of the party, reminding all of "the precious, precious bond between England, Scotland, Wales and Northern Ireland."

After she became Prime Minister, May's cabinet appointments tilted to the right, according to The Guardian; but her speech clearly targeted the left, with a promise to combat the "burning injustice" in British society and create a union "between all of our citizens" and promising to be an advocate for the "ordinary working-class family" and not for the affluent in the UK. "The government I lead will be driven not by the interests of the privileged few but by yours. We will do everything we can to give you more control over your lives. ... When we take the big calls, we'll think not of the powerful, but you. When we pass new laws we'll listen not to the mighty, but to you. When it comes to taxes we'll prioritise not the wealthy but you."

Note: In the first and second ballots, Prime Minister David Cameron was the only abstention.

Candidate	First ballot: 5 July 2016		Second ballot: 7 July 2016		Members' vote (Cancelled)	
Candidate	Votes	%	Votes	%	Votes	%
Theresa May	165	50.2	199	60.5	Unopposed	
Andrea Leadsom	66	20.1	84	25.5	Withdrew	
Michael Gove	48	14.6	46	14.0	Eliminated	
Stephen Crabb	34	10.3	Withdrew, endorsed May			
Liam Fox	16	4.9	Eliminated, endorsed May			
Turnout	329	99.7	329	99.7	—N/a	
Theresa May unopposed

View source data.

=== Academic analysis ===
Analysis of the results of the second ballot by Jeffery et al., published in the journal Parliamentary Affairs, have shown that Conservative MPs could be split into three electoral groups: Remain-backing Conservative MPs were more likely to support May, while Leave-backing MPs were split between socially liberal Leave MPs, who were more likely to back Gove, and socially conservative Leave MPs, who showed a greater propensity to vote for Leadsom.

== Timeline ==
- 24 June 2016 – Following the result of the referendum on the United Kingdom's membership of the European Union, Prime Minister David Cameron announces his resignation as Leader of the Conservative Party.
- 27 June 2016 – The 1922 Committee announce the arrangements for the leadership contest.
- 28 June 2016 – Chancellor of the Exchequer George Osborne announces he will not run for leader; Health Secretary Jeremy Hunt tells Good Morning Britain that he is "seriously considering" putting himself forward as a candidate.
- 28 June 2016 – Stephen Crabb becomes the first Conservative MP to formally announce his candidacy for the leadership. He runs on a ticket with Business Secretary Sajid Javid as his pick for Chancellor of the Exchequer.
- 29 June 2016 – Leadership nominations by the Parliamentary Party open at 18:00 BST.
- 30 June 2016 – Michael Gove announces his bid to become party leader.
- 30 June 2016 – Boris Johnson, the former Mayor of London and the bookies' favourite, announces that he will not enter the leadership contest.
- 30 June 2016 – Theresa May, Andrea Leadsom and Liam Fox also announce their leadership campaigns.
- 30 June 2016 – Nominations close at noon.
- 3 July 2016 – Foreign Secretary Philip Hammond endorses Theresa May, commending her "old-fashioned British pragmatism."
- 4 July 2016 – Boris Johnson endorses Andrea Leadsom, saying she has "the zap, the drive, and the determination" to unite the party.
- 5 July 2016 – Liam Fox is eliminated in the first ballot held by the Parliamentary Party and endorses Theresa May; Stephen Crabb withdraws from the race and endorses Theresa May.
- 7 July 2016 – Michael Gove is eliminated in the second ballot held by the Parliamentary Party; Theresa May and Andrea Leadsom proceed to the party membership ballot.
- 9 July 2016 – The Times reports that Leadsom had told one of its reporters that she would be better placed to lead the country because she has children, whereas May does not.
- 11 July 2016 – Leadsom withdraws from the leadership race and May becomes Leader of the Conservative Party.
- 12 July 2016 – David Cameron chairs his final Cabinet meeting as May plans her cabinet.
- 13 July 2016 – Following his last Prime Minister's Questions, Cameron offers his resignation to the Queen at Buckingham Palace and recommends that she invite May to form a government. The Queen accepts Cameron's resignation, and invites May to form a government.
- 13 July 2016 – Prime Minister Theresa May appoints Boris Johnson, who declined to run for the premiership, the new Foreign Secretary.

== Candidates ==
Name	Born (age at time of contest)	Constituency	Most recent position(s) (at time of contest)	Pre-referendum position on EU membership	Announced candidacy	Proposer and Seconder	Public declarations/ endorsements from MPs (prior to first ballot)	Public declarations/ endorsements from MPs (prior to second ballot)
Stephen Crabb	20 January 1973 (age 43)	MP for Preseli Pembrokeshire (2005–2024)	Secretary of State for Work and Pensions (March–July 2016)	Remain	28 June 2016	Sajid Javid and Chloe Smith	22 / 330 (6.7%)	Withdrew
Liam Fox	22 September 1961 (age 54)	MP for North Somerset (1992–2024)	Secretary of State for Defence (2010–2011)	Leave	29 June 2016	Robert Goodwill and Scott Mann	7 / 330 (2.1%)	Eliminated
Michael Gove	26 August 1967 (age 48)	MP for Surrey Heath (2005–2024)	Lord Chancellor, Secretary of State for Justice (2015–2016)	Leave	30 June 2016	Nicky Morgan and Dominic Raab	27 / 330 (8.2%)	27 / 330 (8.2%)
Andrea Leadsom	13 May 1963 (age 53)	MP for South Northamptonshire (2010–2024)	Minister of State for Energy & Climate Change (2015–2016)	Leave	30 June 2016	Penny Mordaunt and William Wragg	42 / 330 (12.7%)	48 / 330 (14.5%)
Theresa May	1 October 1956 (age 59)	MP for Maidenhead (1997–2024)	Home Secretary (2010–2016)	Remain	30 June 2016	Chris Grayling and Justine Greening	141 / 330 (42.7%)	159 / 330 (48.2%)

=== Explored ===
The following individuals announced that they would seek the leadership of the Conservative Party but then eventually did not stand, or withdrew from the race, due to insufficient support or other reasons:

- John Baron, MP for Basildon and Billericay since 2001 (Leave supporter) (endorsed Andrea Leadsom)
- Jeremy Hunt, Secretary of State for Health since 2012; MP for South West Surrey since 2005 (Remain supporter) (endorsed Theresa May)
- Boris Johnson, former Mayor of London; MP for Uxbridge and South Ruislip since 2015 (Leave supporter) (endorsed Andrea Leadsom)
- Nicky Morgan, Secretary of State for Education since 2014; MP for Loughborough since 2010 (Remain supporter) (endorsed Boris Johnson, later Michael Gove, later Theresa May)

=== Declined ===
The following individuals were the focus of media speculation as being possible leadership candidates, but ruled out a bid or did not stand by the requisite time:

- Graham Brady, Chairman of the 1922 Committee since 2010; MP for Altrincham and Sale West since 1997 (Leave supporter)
- Robert Buckland, Solicitor General for England and Wales since 2014; MP for Swindon South since 2010 (Remain supporter) (endorsed Theresa May)
- George Freeman, Parliamentary Undersecretary of State for Life Sciences since 2014; MP for Mid Norfolk since 2010 (Remain supporter) (endorsed Theresa May)
- Chris Grayling, Leader of the House of Commons since 2015; MP for Epsom and Ewell since 2001 (Leave supporter) (endorsed Theresa May–Campaign Chair)
- Justine Greening, Secretary of State for International Development since 2012; MP for Putney since 2005 (Remain supporter) (endorsed Theresa May)
- Sajid Javid, Secretary of State for Business, Innovation and Skills; MP for Bromsgrove (Remain supporter) (endorsed Stephen Crabb, later Theresa May)
- Penny Mordaunt, Minister of State for the Armed Forces since 2015; MP for Portsmouth North since 2010 (Leave supporter) (endorsed Andrea Leadsom – Campaign Chair)
- David Morris, MP for Morecambe and Lunesdale since 2010 (Remain supporter) (endorsed Stephen Crabb, later Theresa May)
- Jesse Norman, Chairman of the Culture, Media and Sport Select Committee since 2015; MP for Hereford and South Herefordshire since 2010 (endorsed Boris Johnson, then Theresa May)
- George Osborne, First Secretary of State since 2015; Chancellor of the Exchequer since 2010; MP for Tatton (Remain supporter) (endorsed Theresa May)
- Priti Patel, Minister of State for Employment since 2015; MP for Witham (Leave supporter) (endorsed Boris Johnson, then Theresa May)
- Owen Paterson, Secretary of State for Environment, Food and Rural Affairs 2012–2014; Secretary of State for Northern Ireland 2010–2012; MP for North Shropshire since 1997 (Leave supporter) (endorsed Andrea Leadsom)
- Dominic Raab, Parliamentary Under-Secretary of State for Justice since 2015; MP for Esher and Walton (Leave supporter) (endorsed Boris Johnson, later Michael Gove)
- Amber Rudd, Secretary of State for Energy and Climate Change since 2015; MP for Hastings and Rye since 2010 (Remain supporter) (endorsed Boris Johnson, then Theresa May)
- Anna Soubry, Minister of State for Small Business since 2015; MP for Broxtowe (Remain supporter) (endorsed Theresa May)
- Liz Truss, Secretary of State for Environment, Food and Rural Affairs since 2014; MP for South West Norfolk since 2010 (Remain supporter) (endorsed Boris Johnson, then Michael Gove, then Theresa May)
- Theresa Villiers, Secretary of State for Northern Ireland since 2012; Minister of State for Transport 2010–2012; MP for Chipping Barnet since 2005 (Leave Supporter) (endorsed Andrea Leadsom)

== Endorsements ==
N.B. MPs are not required to vote as per their public endorsements.

=== Stephen Crabb ===
Stephen Crabb's endorsements, prior to his withdrawal after first ballot; endorsed Theresa May

MPs

- Alun Cairns, Secretary of State for Wales; MP for Vale of Glamorgan
- Kenneth Clarke, former Chancellor of the Exchequer; MP for Rushcliffe
- Maria Caulfield, MP for Lewes
- Steve Double, MP for St Austell and Newquay
- John Glen, MP for Salisbury
- Luke Hall, MP for Thornbury and Yate
- Simon Hart, MP for Carmarthen West and South Pembrokeshire
- James Heappey, MP for Wells
- Simon Hoare, MP for North Dorset
- Sajid Javid, Secretary of State for Business, Innovation and Skills; MP for Bromsgrove
- Johnny Mercer, MP for Plymouth Moor View
- David Morris, MP for Morecambe and Lunesdale
- Mark Pawsey, MP for Rugby
- Andrew Selous, Minister for Prisons and Rehabilitation; MP for South West Bedfordshire
- Chris Skidmore, MP for Kingswood
- Chloe Smith, MP for Norwich North
- Gary Streeter, MP for South West Devon
- Julian Sturdy, MP for York Outer
- Edward Timpson, Minister of State for Children and Families; MP for Crewe and Nantwich
- Justin Tomlinson, Minister for Disabled People; MP for North Swindon
- Craig Williams, MP for Cardiff North
- Mike Wood, MP for Dudley South
- Jeremy Wright, Attorney General for England and Wales; MP for Kenilworth and Southam

Other Conservative politicians

- Andrew Boff, Leader of the Conservative Group in the London Assembly
- Angela Burns, AM for Carmarthen West and South Pembrokeshire
- Suzy Davies, AM for South Wales West
- Russell George, AM for Montgomeryshire
- Nick Ramsay, AM for Monmouth

=== Liam Fox ===
Liam Fox's endorsements, prior to his elimination in the first ballot; endorsed Theresa May

MPs

- Robert Goodwill, Minister of State for Transport; MP for Scarborough and Whitby
- Gerald Howarth, MP for Aldershot
- Edward Leigh, former Chair of the Public Accounts Committee; MP for Gainsborough
- Scott Mann, MP for North Cornwall
- Paul Maynard, MP for Blackpool North and Cleveleys
- David Nuttall, MP for Bury North
- Iain Stewart, MP for Milton Keynes South
- Robert Syms, MP for Poole

=== Michael Gove ===
Michael Gove's endorsements, prior to his elimination in the second ballot

MPs

- Adam Afriyie, MP for Windsor
- Henry Bellingham, MP for North West Norfolk
- Nick Boles, Minister of State for Skills; MP for Grantham and Stamford
- Conor Burns, MP for Bournemouth West
- Alberto Costa, MP for South Leicestershire
- George Eustice, Minister for Farming, Food and Marine Environment; MP for Camborne and Redruth
- Michael Fabricant, MP for Lichfield
- Suella Fernandes, MP for Fareham
- Nick Gibb, Minister of State for Schools; MP for Bognor Regis and Littlehampton
- John Hayes, Minister for Security; MP for South Holland and The Deepings
- Andrea Jenkyns, MP for Morley and Outwood
- Robert Jenrick, MP for Newark
- Daniel Kawczynski, MP for Shrewsbury and Atcham
- Jack Lopresti, MP for Filton and Bradley Stoke
- Andrew Mitchell, former Chief Whip and Secretary of State for International Development; MP for Sutton Coldfield
- Nicky Morgan, Secretary of State for Education; MP for Loughborough
- Bob Neill, Chair of the Justice Committee; MP for Bromley and Chislehurst
- Dominic Raab, Minister for Civil Liberties; MP for Esher and Walton
- Jacob Rees-Mogg, MP for North East Somerset
- Rishi Sunak, MP for Richmond (Yorks)
- Anne-Marie Trevelyan, MP for Berwick-upon-Tweed
- Ed Vaizey, Minister for Culture, Communications and Creative Industries; MP for Wantage
- Shailesh Vara, Minister for the Courts and Legal Aid; MP for North West Cambridgeshire
- Angela Watkinson, MP for Hornchurch and Upminster
- John Whittingdale, Secretary of State for Culture, Media and Sport, MP for Maldon

Other Conservative politicians

- Shaun Bailey, London Assembly Member (additional member)
- Tony Devenish, London Assembly Member for West Central
- Daniel Hannan, MEP for South East England
- Michael Howard, former Leader of the Conservative Party
- Nigel Lawson, former Chancellor of the Exchequer
- Louise Mensch, former MP for Corby; columnist and author
- The Lord O'Shaughnessy, member of the House of Lords
- Ross Thomson, MSP for North East Scotland (Region)
- Adam Tomkins, MSP for Glasgow (Region)
- The Lord Trimble, former First Minister of Northern Ireland

Members of other parties

- Julia Reid, UKIP MEP for South West England

Other individuals

- James Delingpole, columnist and novelist
- Toby Young, journalist and educationalist

=== Boris Johnson ===
Boris Johnson's endorsements, prior to his announcement that he would not contest the leadership of the Conservative Party

MPs

- Nigel Adams, MP for Selby and Ainsty since 2010
- Jake Berry, MP for Rossendale and Darwen since 2010
- Crispin Blunt, MP for Reigate since 1997
- Nick Boles, MP for Grantham and Stamford since 2010
- David Davis, leadership candidate in 2005; Shadow Home Secretary 2003–2008; MP for Haltemprice and Howden since 1987
- Nadine Dorries, MP for Mid Bedfordshire since 2005
- George Eustice, Minister for Farming, Food and Marine Environment since 2013; MP for Camborne and Redruth since 2010
- Michael Fabricant, MP for Lichfield since 1992
- Michael Gove, Secretary of State for Justice since 2015; Chief Whip 2014–2015; Secretary of State for Education 2010–2014; MP for Surrey Heath since 2005 (campaign manager)
- Amanda Milling, MP for Cannock Chase since 2015
- Jacob Rees-Mogg, MP for North East Somerset since 2010
- Dan Poulter, MP for Central Suffolk and North Ipswich since 2010
- Jo Johnson, MP for Orpington since 2010 (Boris Johnson's brother)
- Dominic Raab, Under Secretary of State for Civil Liberties since 2015; MP for Esher and Walton since 2010
- Nicholas Soames, MP for Mid Sussex since 1997
- Liz Truss, Secretary of State for Environment, Food and Rural Affairs since 2014; MP for South West Norfolk since 2010
- Ben Wallace, MP for Wyre and Preston North since 2005
- John Whittingdale, Secretary of State for Culture, Media and Sport since 2015; MP for Maldon since 1992
- Nadhim Zahawi, MP for Stratford-on-Avon since 2010

Other individuals

- Louise Mensch, former MP for Corby 2010–2012, author and columnist

=== Andrea Leadsom ===
Andrea Leadsom's endorsements, prior to her withdrawal after the second ballot

MPs

- Nigel Adams, MP for Selby and Ainsty
- Steve Baker, MP for Wycombe
- John Baron, MP for Basildon and Billericay
- Julian Brazier, Minister for Reserves; MP for Canterbury
- Andrew Bridgen, MP for North West Leicestershire
- David Burrowes, MP for Enfield Southgate
- Bill Cash, MP for Stone
- Maria Caulfield, MP for Lewes
- Philip Davies, MP for Shipley
- Nadine Dorries, MP for Mid Bedfordshire
- Steve Double, MP for St Austell and Newquay (previously endorsed Stephen Crabb)
- Richard Drax, MP for South Dorset
- James Duddridge, MP for Rochford and Southend East
- Iain Duncan Smith, MP for Chingford and Woodford Green and former Leader of the Conservative Party
- James Gray, MP for North Wiltshire (previously endorsed Liam Fox)
- Chris Green, MP for Bolton West
- Chris Heaton-Harris, MP for Daventry
- Gordon Henderson, MP for Sittingbourne and Sheppey
- Philip Hollobone, MP for Kettering
- Stewart Jackson, MP for Peterborough
- Bernard Jenkin, Chair of the Public Administration and Constitutional Affairs Committee; MP for Harwich and North Essex
- Boris Johnson, former Mayor of London, MP for Uxbridge and South Ruislip
- Edward Leigh, former Chair of the Public Accounts Committee; MP for Gainsborough (previously endorsed Liam Fox)
- Charlotte Leslie, MP for Bristol North West
- Julian Lewis, Chair of the Defence Committee; MP for New Forest East
- Peter Lilley, MP for Hitchin and Harpenden
- Tim Loughton, MP for East Worthing and Shoreham
- Karen Lumley, MP for Redditch
- Karl McCartney, MP for Lincoln
- Stephen McPartland, MP for Stevenage
- Penny Mordaunt, Minister of State for the Armed Forces; MP for Portsmouth North
- Anne Marie Morris, MP for Newton Abbot
- James Morris, MP for Halesowen and Rowley Regis
- David Mowat, MP for Warrington South
- Sheryll Murray, MP for South East Cornwall
- Andrew Murrison, MP for South West Wiltshire
- David Nuttall, MP for Bury North (previously endorsed Liam Fox)
- Neil Parish, Chair of the Environment, Food and Rural Affairs Committee; MP for Tiverton and Honiton
- Owen Paterson, MP for North Shropshire
- Dan Poulter, MP for Central Suffolk and North Ipswich
- Tom Pursglove, MP for Corby
- Jacob Rees-Mogg, MP for North East Somerset (previously endorsed Michael Gove)
- John Redwood, MP for Wokingham
- Laurence Robertson, MP for Tewkesbury
- Andrew Rosindell, MP for Romford
- Henry Smith, MP for Crawley
- Bob Stewart, MP for Beckenham
- Desmond Swayne, Minister for International Development; MP for New Forest West
- Michael Tomlinson, MP for Mid Dorset and North Poole
- Craig Tracey, MP for North Warwickshire
- Martin Vickers, MP for Cleethorpes
- Theresa Villiers, Secretary of State for Northern Ireland; MP for Chipping Barnet
- Heather Wheeler, MP for South Derbyshire
- William Wragg, MP for Hazel Grove

Other Conservative politicians

- Tim Bell, public relations advisor to Margaret Thatcher
- Michael Howard, former Leader of the Opposition and former Home Secretary
- Norman Tebbit, former Chairman of the Conservative Party

Members of other parties

- Suzanne Evans, former Deputy Chairman of the UK Independence Party
- Nigel Farage, UKIP MEP for South-East England and former leader of UKIP
- Nick Griffin, former leader of the British National Party, former MEP for North West England
- Margot Parker, UKIP MEP for East Midlands
- Anne Marie Waters, former UKIP member and Parliamentary candidate for Lewisham East in 2015, director of Sharia Watch UK and incumbent leader of For Britain

Other individuals

- James Delingpole, columnist and novelist (previously endorsed Michael Gove)
- Gerard Lyons, economist
- Louise Mensch, former MP for Corby; columnist and author (previously endorsed Michael Gove)
- Allison Pearson, journalist for The Daily Telegraph

=== Theresa May ===
Theresa May's endorsements, prior to her victory

MPs

- Peter Aldous, MP for Waveney
- Lucy Allan, MP for Telford
- Heidi Allen, MP for South Cambridgeshire
- Stuart Andrew, MP for Pudsey
- Caroline Ansell, MP for Eastbourne
- Edward Argar, MP for Charnwood
- Victoria Atkins, MP for Louth and Horncastle
- Harriett Baldwin, Economic Secretary to the Treasury; MP for West Worcestershire
- Steve Barclay, MP for North East Cambridgeshire
- Gavin Barwell, Whip (Comptroller of the Household); MP for Croydon Central
- Guto Bebb, Minister for Wales; MP for Aberconwy
- Paul Beresford, Chair of the Administration Committee; MP for Mole Valley
- James Berry, MP for Kingston and Surbiton
- Andrew Bingham, MP for High Peak
- Nicola Blackwood, Chair of the Science and Technology Committee; MP for Oxford West and Abingdon
- Crispin Blunt, Chair of the Foreign Affairs Committee; MP for Reigate
- Karen Bradley, Minister for Preventing Abuse, Exploitation and Crime; MP for Staffordshire Moorlands
- Steve Brine, MP for Winchester
- James Brokenshire, Minister of State for Immigration; MP for Old Bexley and Sidcup
- Robert Buckland, Solicitor General; MP for South Swindon
- Simon Burns, MP for Chelmsford
- Neil Carmichael, Chair of the Education Committee; MP for Stroud
- James Cartlidge, MP for South Suffolk
- Alex Chalk, MP for Cheltenham
- Rehman Chishti, MP for Gillingham and Rainham
- Greg Clark, Secretary of State for Communities and Local Government, MP for Tunbridge Wells
- James Cleverly, MP for Braintree
- Geoffrey Clifton-Brown, MP for The Cotswolds
- Therese Coffey, Deputy Leader of the House of Commons; MP for Suffolk Coastal
- Damian Collins, MP for Folkestone and Hythe
- Oliver Colvile MP for Plymouth Sutton and Devonport
- Stephen Crabb, MP for Preseli Pembrokeshire. Endorsed after his withdrawal from the contest.
- Tracey Crouch, Minister for Sport, Tourism and Heritage; MP for Chatham and Aylesford
- Byron Davies, MP for Gower
- James Davies, MP for Vale of Clwyd
- Mims Davies, MP for Eastleigh
- David Davis, MP for Haltemprice and Howden
- Caroline Dinenage, MP for Gosport
- Michelle Donelan, MP for Chippenham
- Oliver Dowden, MP for Hertsmere
- Jackie Doyle-Price, Whip; MP for Thurrock
- Flick Drummond, MP for Portsmouth South
- Alan Duncan, MP for Rutland and Melton
- Michael Ellis, MP for Northampton North
- Jane Ellison, Minister for Public Health; MP for Battersea
- Tobias Ellwood, Minister for Foreign and Commonwealth Affairs; MP for Bournemouth East
- Charlie Elphicke, MP for Dover
- Graham Evans, MP for Weaver Vale
- Nigel Evans, MP for Ribble Valley (previously endorsed Boris Johnson)
- David Evennett, Whip; MP for Bexleyheath and Crayford
- Michael Fabricant, MP for Lichfield (previously endorsed Michael Gove)
- Michael Fallon, Secretary of State for Defence; MP for Sevenoaks
- Kevin Foster, MP for Torbay
- Liam Fox, MP for North Somerset. Endorsed after being eliminated from contest.
- Lucy Frazer, MP for South East Cambridgeshire
- George Freeman, Minister for Life Sciences, MP for Mid-Norfolk
- Mike Freer, MP for Finchley and Golders Green
- Roger Gale, MP for North Thanet
- Edward Garnier, MP for Harborough
- Mark Garnier, MP for Wyre Forest
- David Gauke, Financial Secretary to the Treasury; MP for South West Hertfordshire
- Nus Ghani, MP for Wealden
- Nick Gibb, Minister of State for Schools; MP for Bognor Regis and Littlehampton (previously endorsed Michael Gove)
- Michael Gove, Secretary of State for Justice; MP for Surrey Heath (endorsed after his elimination from the contest)
- Richard Graham, MP for Gloucester
- Helen Grant, MP for Maidstone and The Weald
- Chris Grayling, Leader of the House of Commons; MP for Epsom and Ewell (Campaign Chair)
- Damian Green, MP for Ashford (Campaign Spokesperson)
- Justine Greening, Secretary of State for International Development; MP for Putney
- Dominic Grieve, Chair of the Intelligence and Security Committee; MP for Beaconsfield
- Andrew Griffiths, MP for Burton
- Ben Gummer, Minister for Care Quality; MP for Ipswich
- Sam Gyimah, Minister for Childcare and Education; MP for East Surrey
- Robert Halfon, Minister without portfolio, MP for Harlow
- Luke Hall, MP for Thornbury and Yate (previously endorsed Stephen Crabb)
- Philip Hammond, Secretary of State for Foreign and Commonwealth Affairs; MP for Runnymede and Weybridge
- Stephen Hammond, MP for Wimbledon
- Matthew Hancock, Minister for the Cabinet Office; MP for West Suffolk
- Greg Hands, Chief Secretary to the Treasury, MP for Chelsea and Fulham
- Richard Harrington, Minister for Syrian Refugees; MP for Watford
- Alan Haselhurst, MP for Saffron Walden
- Oliver Heald, MP for North East Hertfordshire
- James Heappey, MP for Wells (previously endorsed Stephen Crabb)
- Peter Heaton-Jones, MP for North Devon
- Damian Hinds, Exchequer Secretary to the Treasury, MP for East Hampshire
- Kevin Hollinrake, MP for Thirsk and Malton
- George Hollingbery, Whip; MP for Meon Valley
- Kris Hopkins, Whip; MP for Keighley
- John Howell, MP for Henley
- Ben Howlett, MP for Bath
- Nigel Huddleston, MP for Mid Worcestershire
- Jeremy Hunt, Secretary of State for Health; MP for South West Surrey
- Nick Hurd, Minister for International Development; MP for Ruislip, Northwood and Pinner
- Margot James, MP for Stourbridge
- Sajid Javid, Secretary of State for Business, Innovation and Skills since 2015; MP for Bromsgrove (previously endorsed Stephen Crabb)
- Robert Jenrick, MP for Newark (previously endorsed Michael Gove)
- Jo Johnson, Minister of State for Universities and Science; MP for Orpington (previously endorsed his brother Boris Johnson)
- Andrew Jones, MP for Harrogate and Knaresborough
- David Jones, former Secretary of State for Wales; MP for Clwyd West
- Marcus Jones, Minister for Local Government, MP for Nuneaton
- Simon Kirby, MP for Brighton Kemptown
- Julian Knight, MP for Solihull
- Kwasi Kwarteng, MP for Spelthorne
- Mark Lancaster, Minister for Defence Personnel, Welfare and Veterans; MP for Milton Keynes North
- Phillip Lee, MP for Bracknell
- Brandon Lewis, Minister of State for Housing and Planning; MP for Great Yarmouth
- David Mackintosh, MP for Northampton South
- Kit Malthouse, MP for North West Hampshire
- Alan Mak, MP for Havant
- Tania Mathias, MP for Twickenham
- Jason McCartney, MP for Colne Valley
- Patrick McLoughlin, Secretary of State for Transport; MP for Derbyshire Dales
- Huw Merriman, MP for Bexhill and Battle
- Stephen Metcalfe, MP for South Basildon and East Thurrock
- Maria Miller, Chair of the Women and Equalities Committee; MP for Basingstoke
- Anne Milton, Deputy Chief Whip; MP for Guildford
- Nicky Morgan, Secretary of State for Education; MP for Loughborough (previously endorsed Michael Gove)
- David Morris, MP for Morecambe and Lunesdale (previously endorsed Stephen Crabb)
- Wendy Morton, MP for Aldridge Brownhills
- David Mundell, Secretary of State for Scotland; MP for Dumfriesshire, Clydesdale and Tweeddale
- Bob Neill, Chair of the Justice Committee, MP for Bromley and Chislehurst (previously endorsed Michael Gove)
- Sarah Newton, Whip; MP for Truro and Falmouth
- Caroline Nokes, MP for Romsey and Southampton North
- Jesse Norman, Chair of the Culture, Media and Sport Committee; MP for Hereford and South Herefordshire
- Guy Opperman, Whip; MP for Hexham
- Priti Patel, Minister of State for Employment; MP for Witham
- Mark Pawsey, MP for Rugby (previously endorsed Stephen Crabb)
- Mike Penning, Minister of State for Policing, Fire and Criminal Justice and Victims; MP for Hemel Hempstead
- Andrew Percy, MP for Brigg and Goole
- Claire Perry, Minister for Transport; MP for Devizes
- Stephen Phillips, MP for Sleaford and North Hykeham
- Chris Philp, MP for Croydon South
- Eric Pickles, MP for Brentwood and Ongar
- Rebecca Pow, MP for Taunton Deane
- Victoria Prentis, MP for Banbury
- Mark Prisk, MP for Hertford and Stortford
- Mark Pritchard, MP for The Wrekin
- Will Quince, MP for Colchester
- Mary Robinson, MP for Cheadle
- Amber Rudd, Secretary of State for Energy and Climate Change; MP for Hastings and Rye
- David Rutley, MP for Macclesfield
- Antoinette Sandbach, MP for Eddisbury
- Andrew Selous, Minister for Prisons and Rehabilitation; MP for South West Bedfordshire (previously endorsed Stephen Crabb)
- Grant Shapps, MP for Welwyn Hatfield
- Alok Sharma, MP for Reading West
- Alec Shelbrooke, MP for Elmet and Rothwell
- Chris Skidmore, MP for Kingswood (previously endorsed Stephen Crabb)
- Chloe Smith, MP for Norwich North (previously endorsed Stephen Crabb)
- Henry Smith, MP for Crawley
- Julian Smith, Whip; MP for Skipton and Ripon
- Nicholas Soames, MP for Mid Sussex
- Anna Soubry, Minister of State for Small Business, Industry and Enterprise; MP for Broxtowe
- Caroline Spelman, MP for Meriden
- Mark Spencer, MP for Sherwood
- Andrew Stephenson, MP for Pendle
- Mel Stride, Whip; MP for Central Devon
- Graham Stuart, MP for Beverley and Holderness
- Hugo Swire, Minister for the Foreign and Commonwealth Office; MP for East Devon
- Robert Syms, MP for Poole (previously endorsed Liam Fox)
- Maggie Throup, MP for Erewash
- Kelly Tolhurst, MP for Rochester and Strood
- Justin Tomlinson, Minister for Disabled People; MP for North Swindon
- Anne-Marie Trevelyan, MP for Berwick-upon-Tweed (previously endorsed Michael Gove)
- Liz Truss, Secretary of State for Environment, Food and Rural Affairs; MP for South West Norfolk
- Tom Tugendhat, MP for Tonbridge and Malling
- Ed Vaizey, Minister of State for Culture, Communications and Creative Industries; MP for Wantage (previously endorsed Michael Gove)
- Robin Walker, MP for Worcester
- Ben Wallace, Minister for Northern Ireland; MP for Wyre and Preston North
- Matt Warman, MP for Boston and Skegness
- Helen Whately, MP for Faversham and Mid Kent
- Chris White, MP for Warwick and Leamington
- Craig Whittaker, MP for Calder Valley
- Craig Williams, MP for Cardiff North (previously endorsed Stephen Crabb)
- Gavin Williamson, MP for South Staffordshire
- Rob Wilson, Minister for Civil Society; MP for Reading East
- Sarah Wollaston, Chair of the Health Committee; MP for Totnes
- Mike Wood, MP for Dudley South (previously endorsed Stephen Crabb)
- Nadhim Zahawi, MP for Stratford-on-Avon

Other Conservative politicians

- Lord Ahmad of Wimbledon, Minister for Transport and Countering Extremism
- Nick Alston, former Police and Crime Commissioner for Essex
- Gareth Bacon, London Assembly Member for Bexley and Bromley
- Miles Briggs, MSP for Lothian (Region)
- Alexander Burnett, MSP for Aberdeenshire West
- Donald Cameron, MSP for Highlands and Islands (Region)
- Jackson Carlaw, Deputy Leader of the Scottish Conservatives; MSP for Eastwood
- Finlay Carson, MSP for Galloway and West Dumfries
- Baroness Cumberlege
- Ruth Davidson, Leader of the Scottish Conservatives; MSP for Edinburgh Central
- Michael Dobbs, Conservative Lord, author of the original House of Cards novels
- Ian Duncan, MEP for Scotland
- Jacqueline Foster, MEP for North West England
- Maurice Golden, MSP for West Scotland (Region)
- Annabel Goldie, Leader of the Scottish Conservatives (2005–2011)
- Paul Goodman, ConservativeHome journalist and former MP for Wycombe
- Jamie Greene, MSP for West of Scotland (Region)
- Sajjid Karim, MEP for North West England
- Timothy Kirkhope, MEP for Yorkshire and the Humber
- Baroness (Michelle) Mone, founder of lingerie company Ultimo
- Oliver Mundell, MSP for Dumfriesshire
- Steve Norris, Former Transport Minister and London Mayoral candidate
- Spencer Pitfield, Director of Conservative Trade Unionists
- Nick Ramsay, AM for Monmouth (previously endorsed Stephen Crabb)
- Councillor David Simmonds, Deputy Chairman of the Local Government Association
- Baroness Stowell of Beeston, Leader of the House of Lords
- Baroness Warsi
- John Scott, MSP for Ayr
- Annie Wells, MSP for Glasgow (Region)
- Lord Young of Graffham

Newspapers

- Daily Mail
- The Daily Telegraph
- The Sunday Telegraph

== Opinion polling ==
=== Polls via polling organisations ===
Note some polls have asked respondents how they would vote in certain head-to-head scenarios, as indicated below.

Date(s) administered	Poll source	Sample size	Stephen Crabb	Liam Fox	Michael Gove	Boris Johnson	Andrea Leadsom	Theresa May	George Osborne	Other/ Undecided
11 July 2016	Andrea Leadsom withdraws from the ballot, Theresa May is declared the new Leader of the Conservative Party.									
7 July 2016	Sky Data	1,002 "nationally representative" Sky customers	—	—	—	—	25%	48%	—	Don't know 28%
7 July 2016	Second ballot: Andrea Leadsom and Theresa May are entered into the ballot, Michael Gove is eliminated.									
5 July 2016	First ballot: Theresa May wins 50.2% of MP support, Liam Fox is eliminated and Stephen Crabb withdraws from the election.									
4–5 July 2016	Survation	1,062 Conservative councillors	2.3%	1.8%	5.1%	—	21.8%	46.2%	—	Undecided 17.9% Refused 4.9%
4–5 July 2016	Survation	1,062 Conservative councillors	—	—	12.7%	—	—	59.9%	—	Undecided 20.9% Refused 6.5%
4–5 July 2016	Survation	1,062 Conservative councillors	—	—	—	—	25.5%	50.5%	—	Undecided 18.6% Refused 5.4%
1–4 July 2016	YouGov/The Times	994 Conservative Party members	5%	5%	9%	—	20%	54%	—	6%
1–4 July 2016	YouGov/The Times	994 Conservative Party members	—	—	—	—	31%	63%	—	6%
1–4 July 2016	YouGov/The Times	994 Conservative Party members	—	21%	—	—	—	71%	—	7%
1–4 July 2016	YouGov/The Times	994 Conservative Party members	—	—	21%	—	—	72%	—	7%
1–4 July 2016	YouGov/The Times	994 Conservative Party members	13%	—	—	—	—	76%	—	10%
1–4 July 2016	YouGov/The Times	994 Conservative Party members	29%	—	—	—	53%	—	—	17%
1–4 July 2016	YouGov/The Times	994 Conservative Party members	—	—	25%	—	53%	—	—	17%
30 June 2016	Nomination period closes at noon BST. Boris Johnson declares that he will not run as a candidate.									
29 June 2016	Nomination period opens at 6 pm BST.									
27–29 June 2016	YouGov/The Times	1,001 Conservative Party members	7%	4%	—	27%	7%	36%	4%	Don't know 6% David Davis 4% Sajid Javid 3% Nicky Morgan 1%
27–29 June 2016	YouGov/The Times	1,001 Conservative Party members	—	—	—	38%	—	55%	—	7%
27–29 June 2016	YouGov/The Times	1,001 Conservative Party members	—	—	—	48%	31%	—	—	21%
27–29 June 2016	YouGov/The Times	1,001 Conservative Party members	31%	—	—	54%	—	—	—	16%
27–29 June 2016	YouGov/The Times	1,001 Conservative Party members	—	29%	—	52%	—	—	—	19%
26–27 June 2016	YouGov/The Times	438 Conservative voters (Note: People who are likely to vote Conservative in next general election.)	1%	4%	8%	24%	1%	31%	4%	Don't know 24% Sajid Javid 2% Jeremy Hunt 1% Nicky Morgan 0%
26–27 June 2016	YouGov/The Times	2,013 British residents (Note: Residents over 18 in Great Britain.)	2%	3%	5%	18%	1%	19%	3%	Don't know 44% Sajid Javid 3% Jeremy Hunt 1% Nicky Morgan 0%
25 June 2016	Bristol Post	700 voters	—	19%	6%	41%	—	27%	7%	Nicky Morgan 1%
24–25 June 2016	Survation/The Mail on Sunday	1,033 British residents	1.6%	—	6.1%	28.3%	—	13.1%	6.9%	Don't know 37.1% Ruth Davidson 5.5% Jeremy Hunt 1.4%
24–25 June 2016	Survation/The Mail on Sunday	1,033 British residents	—	—	—	61.1%	—	—	38.9%	—
24–25 June 2016	Survation/The Mail on Sunday	1,033 British residents	—	—	—	50.4%	—	49.6%	—	—
24–25 June 2016	Survation/The Mail on Sunday	1,033 British residents	—	—	42.4%	57.6%	—	—	—	—
24–25 June 2016	Survation/The Mail on Sunday	1,033 British residents	—	—	—	62.1%	—	—	—	Jeremy Hunt 37.9%
24–25 June 2016	Survation/The Mail on Sunday	1,033 British residents	—	—	—	55.7%	—	—	—	Ruth Davidson 44.3%
24–25 June 2016	Survation/The Mail on Sunday	1,033 British residents	38.5%	—	—	61.5%	—	—	—	—
24–25 June 2016	Survation/The Mail on Sunday	252 Conservative voters (Note: People who voted Conservative in the 2015 general election.)	1.7%	—	6.9%	32.9%	—	19.3%	10.4%	Don't know 24.1% Jeremy Hunt 2.6% Ruth Davidson 2.1%
24–25 June 2016	Survation/The Mail on Sunday	252 Conservative voters	—	—	—	58.5%	—	—	41.5%	—
24–25 June 2016	Survation/The Mail on Sunday	252 Conservative voters	—	—	—	50%	—	50%	—	—
24–25 June 2016	Survation/The Mail on Sunday	252 Conservative voters	—	—	37.7%	62.3%	—	—	—	—
24–25 June 2016	Survation/The Mail on Sunday	252 Conservative voters	—	—	—	70.5%	—	—	—	Jeremy Hunt 29.5%
24–25 June 2016	Survation/The Mail on Sunday	252 Conservative voters	—	—	—	68%	—	—	—	Ruth Davidson 32%
24–25 June 2016	Survation/The Mail on Sunday	252 Conservative voters	30.6%	—	—	69.4%	—	—	—	—
24 June 2016	David Cameron announces his resignation as leader of the Conservative Party and as Prime Minister of the United Kingdom.									
23 June 2016	The United Kingdom votes to Leave the European Union in a nationwide referendum.									
23–26 February 2016	YouGov	1,005 Conservative Party members	—	—	—	43%	—	19%	22%	Sajid Javid 7% Don't know 7% Nicky Morgan 1%
14–17 November 2015	Ipsos MORI/Evening Standard	307 Conservative voters	—	—	—	32%	—	26%	23%	19%
14–17 November 2015	Ipsos MORI/Evening Standard	1,021 British residents	—	—	—	25%	—	19%	11%	45%
19–23 September 2015	Ipsos MORI	395 Conservative voters	—	—	—	29%	—	18%	32%	19%
19–23 September 2015	Ipsos MORI	1,255 British residents	—	—	—	27%	—	17%	15%	41%
21–22 September 2015	Survation/HuffPost	303 Conservative voters	—	—	—	30.4%	—	16.3%	26.2%	Don't know 23.3% Jeremy Hunt 2.9% Nicky Morgan 0.9%
21–22 September 2015	Survation/HuffPost	1,008 British residents	—	—	—	25%	—	11.2%	14.6%	Don't know 45.2% Nicky Morgan 2.1% Jeremy Hunt 2%

== See also ==
- 2019 Conservative Party leadership election
- 2017 United Kingdom general election
- 2016 United Kingdom European Union membership referendum
- 2016 Labour Party leadership election (UK)
