= Worlds End, Hampshire =

Village in Hampshire, England

Coordinates: 50.9000°N 1.0999°W

Worlds End
- Location within Hampshire
- OS grid reference: SU633115
- Civil parish: Hambledon
- District: City of Winchester
- Shire county: Hampshire
- Region: South East
- Country: England
- Sovereign state: United Kingdom
- Post town: Waterlooville
- Postcode district: PO7 4
- Dialling code: 023
- Police: Hampshire and Isle of Wight
- Fire: Hampshire and Isle of Wight
- Ambulance: South Central
- UK Parliament: Fareham and Waterlooville
- Website: Hambledon, Hampshire

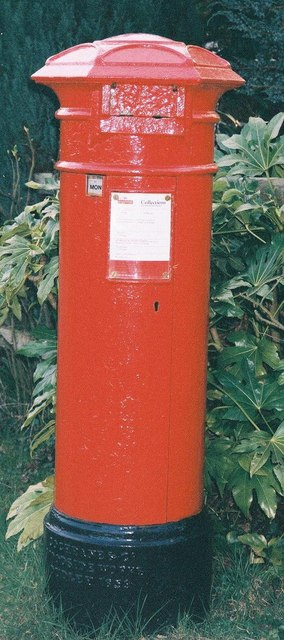
"First National Standard" Victorian pillar box at Worlds End

Worlds End is a small village in the civil parish of Denmead in the City of Winchester district of Hampshire, England. The village is about 7 miles (11 km) north of Portsmouth and 3.5 miles (5.6 km) north-west of Waterlooville, its nearest town. It has one of the oldest postboxes in the United Kingdom.
