= Portsmouth Youth Voice Awards =

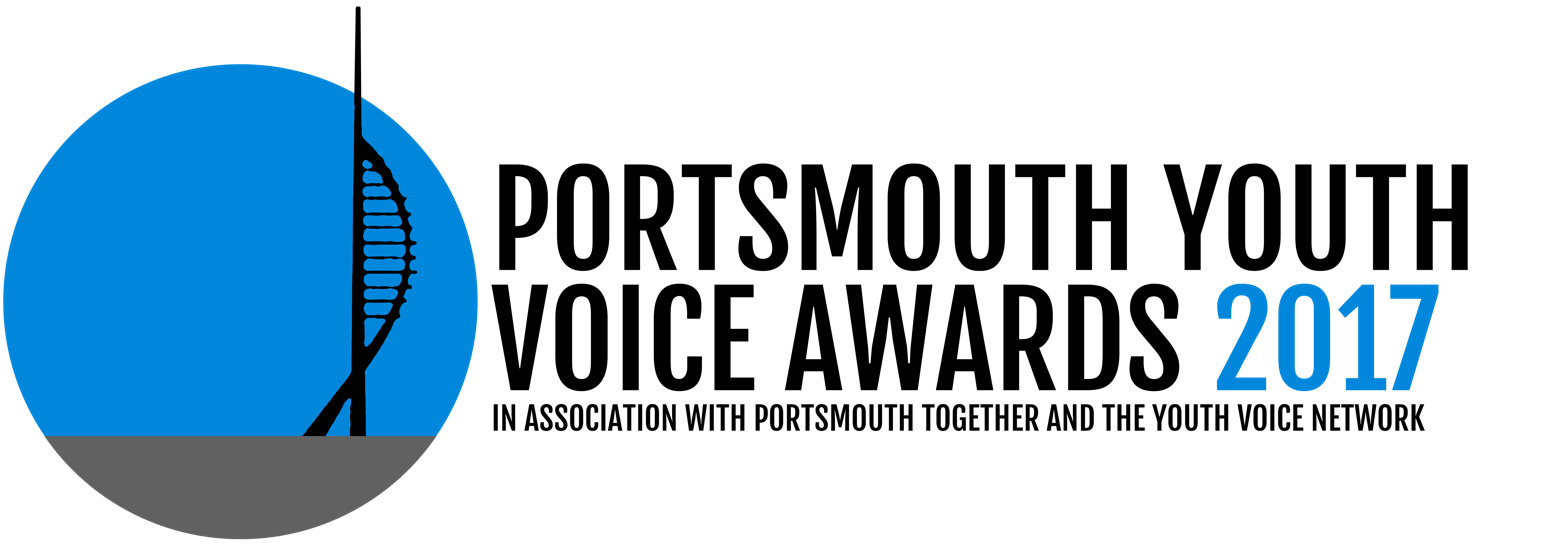
- Portsmouth Youth Voice Awards 2017 logo
- Sponsored by: Portsmouth Together
- Date: 16 February 2017
- Location: Fratton Park
- Country: UK
- Presented by: The Youth Voice Network
- First award: 2017
- Website: youthvoiceawards.com

The Portsmouth Youth Voice Awards (known previously as "the PYV Awards") aims to recognise both individuals and organisations who have made a contribution to youth voice in the city.

The first awards ceremony in 2017 was hosted by Portsmouth Youth Voice chair Sayeeda Nur and Youth Voice Network director Peter Marcus.

== Ceremonies ==
The first Portsmouth Youth Voice Awards took place as part of the Portsmouth Youth Social Action Conference on Thursday 16 February 2017, at Fratton Park, Portsmouth.

The Portsmouth Youth Social Action Conference was a full day of workshops, discussions and panels. It sought to bring together professionals from the public sector, the third sector, Councillors, youth organisations, and most importantly young people, to discuss, "How do we enable more young people to get involved in volunteering and social action?"

The conference was being jointly hosted by The Portsmouth Together Partnership, Pompey in the Community and Portsmouth Youth Voice and in association with Step Up To Serve and the #iwill campaign.

== Eligibility and voting ==
Nominees for the six main categories (young person, teacher, school, public sector organisation, community organisation and youth organisation) were sought from the public, particularly young people. Over 30 nominations were received for the 2017 awards. These were then assessed by young people in the city in order to choose a winner.

Nominations for the Youth Voice Star of the year were drawn from those nominated for other awards, as well as on the recommendation of the chair of Portsmouth Youth Voice, the director of The Youth Voice Network and the chief service officer of Portsmouth Together. These were assessed by a panel put together by The Youth Voice Network.

== TV and media coverage ==
The 2017 awards received coverage on About My Area, a local news website.

== Awards ==
In 2017, there were 7 categories up for grabs, six of which were nominated by young people in the city. The winners are as follows:

Category	Winner	Presented By
Young Person of the Year	Andrew Dane Impey	Sayeeda Nur (Chair, Portsmouth Youth Voice)
Teacher of the Year	Bev Lewis, Portsmouth Academy	Sayeeda Nur (Chair, Portsmouth Youth Voice)
School of the Year	Portsmouth High School	Sayeeda Nur (Chair, Portsmouth Youth Voice)
Public Sector Organisation of the Year	The 4U Project	Sayeeda Nur (Chair, Portsmouth Youth Voice)
Adult Organisation of the Year	Lions Club International District 105D	Sayeeda Nur (Chair, Portsmouth Youth Voice)
Youth Organisation of the Year	The Scout Association, Hampshire Scouts, Portsmouth Scouts	Sayeeda Nur (Chair, Portsmouth Youth Voice)
Youth Voice Star of the Year	Sayeeda Nur	Flick Drummond MP
