= Jackie Lawrence (politician) =

British politician

Member of Parliament for Preseli Pembrokeshire
- In office 2 May 1997 – 11 April 2005
- Preceded by: Constituency Established
- Succeeded by: Stephen Crabb

Personal details
- Born: 9 August 1948 (age 78) Birmingham, England
- Party: Labour
- Spouse: David Lawrence
- Education: Open University

Jacqueline Rita Lawrence (born 9 August 1948, Birmingham) is a politician in the United Kingdom. She was Labour member of parliament for the Welsh seat of Preseli Pembrokeshire, from 1997 until 2005.

== Early life ==
Lawrence studied at Upperthorpe College in Darlington, and the Open University. She moved to Pembrokeshire in the 1970s and learnt Welsh in order to support her children through Welsh medium education.

Lawrence worked for the Trustee Savings Bank and became a member of Dyfed County Council Pembrokeshire Coast National Park Authority and the Pembrokeshire Police authority. She then became election agent for neighbouring MP Nick Ainger in the 1992 general election and leader of the Labour Group on Pembrokeshire County Council on its formation as a unitary authority before being adopted as Parliamentary candidate for the Preseli Pembrokeshire constituency.

== Parliamentary career ==
Lawrence was selected to stand for election for Labour through an all-women shortlist, and became MP for Preseli Pembrokeshire in the 1997 election. She was a New Labour loyalist, working on environmental, rural and Welsh language issues. She was a member of the Welsh Affairs Select Committee from 1997 to 2001, and a member of the DTI Department of Trade and Industry Select Committee from 2001 until becoming a Parliamentary Private Secretary at the DTI to Jacqui Smith who was then Minister of State at the DTI. She was Chair of the Welsh Group of Labour MPs at Westminster from 2003 to 2004 and Chair of the Parliamentary All-Party Group for National Parks until leaving Westminster in 2005.

When supporting a government campaign aimed at reducing teenage pregnancy, she revealed that she had given birth to a daughter when she was 17, who was subsequently adopted. She was strongly anti-hunting with dogs and supported legislation to outlaw the practice in the UK.

Lawrence stood down from Parliament at the 2005 general election, at which the Preseli Pembrokeshire seat was gained by the Conservative's Stephen Crabb.

== After Parliament ==
In 2005, Lawrence was a founding signatory of the Henry Jackson Society principles, advocating a proactive approach to the spread of liberal democracy across the world, including when necessary by military methods.

== Personal life ==
She married David Lawrence in 1968. They have two sons and one daughter.

Parliament of the United Kingdom
| New constituency | Member of Parliament for Preseli Pembrokeshire; 1997–2005 | Succeeded by Stephen Crabb |
