= George Hollingbery =

British politician and diplomat (born 1963)

Sir George Hollingbery KCMG
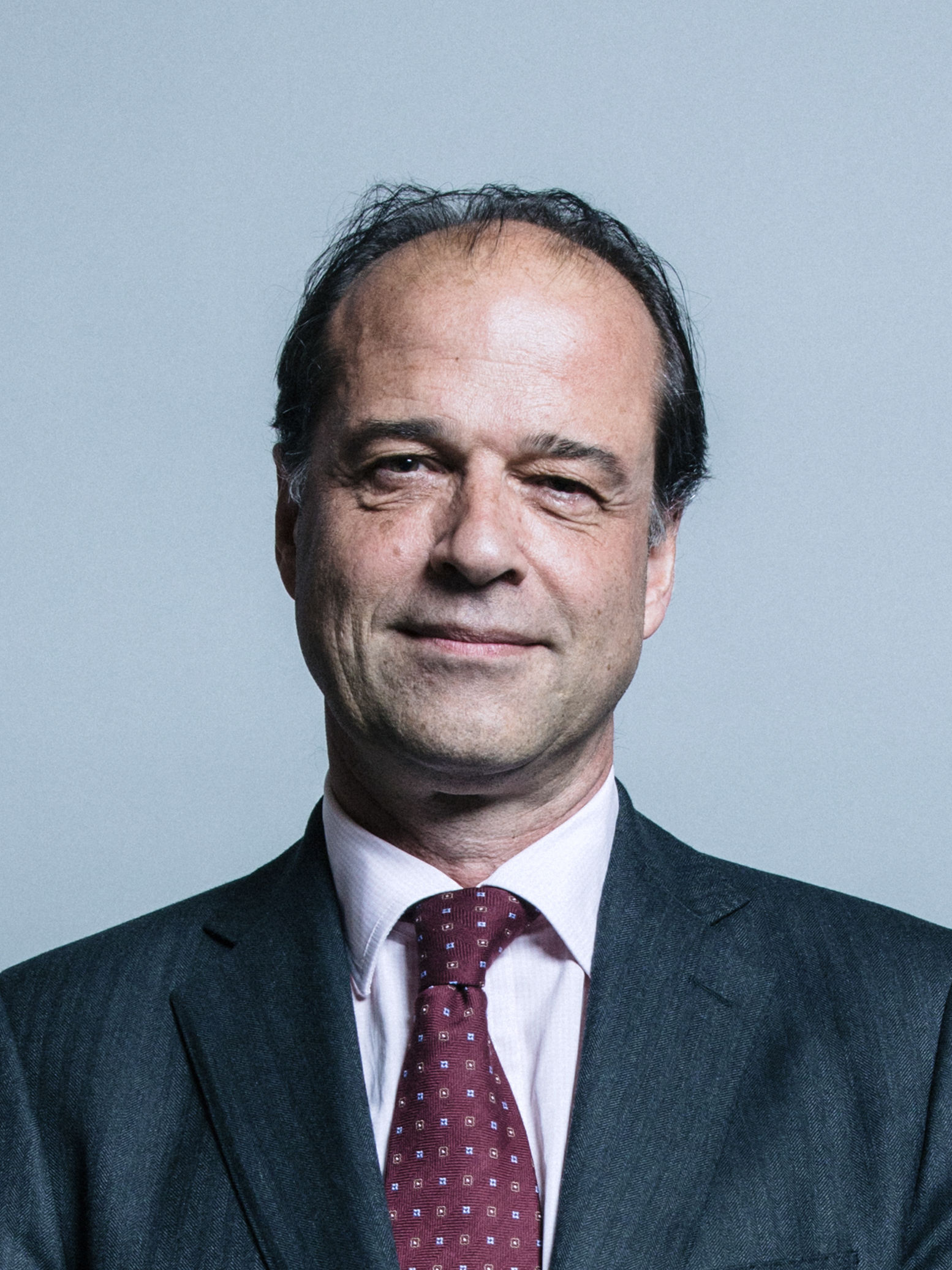
- Official portrait, 2017

British Ambassador to Cuba
- In office 11 February 2022 – 31 January 2025
- Monarchs: Elizabeth II; Charles III
- Prime Minister: Boris Johnson; Liz Truss; Rishi Sunak; Keir Starmer
- Preceded by: Antony Stokes
- Succeeded by: James Hooley

Minister of State for Trade Policy
- In office 21 June 2018 – 25 July 2019
- Prime Minister: Theresa May
- Preceded by: Greg Hands
- Succeeded by: Conor Burns

Lord Commissioner of HM Treasury
- In office 13 May 2015 – 17 July 2016
- Prime Minister: David Cameron
- Preceded by: Gavin Barwell
- Succeeded by: Steve Barclay

Member of Parliament for Meon Valley
- In office 6 May 2010 – 6 November 2019
- Preceded by: Constituency created
- Succeeded by: Flick Drummond

Personal details
- Born: 12 October 1963 (age 62) Beverley, East Riding of Yorkshire, England
- Party: Conservative
- Spouse: Janette Hollingbery
- Children: 3
- Education: Lady Margaret Hall, Oxford; Wharton School, University of Pennsylvania
- Website: www.georgehollingbery.com

Sir George Michael Edward Hollingbery KCMG (born 12 October 1963) is a British politician and diplomat, who recently served as the British Ambassador to Cuba. A member of the Conservative Party, he previously was the Member of Parliament (MP) for Meon Valley in Hampshire from 2010 to 2019.

== Early life and business career ==
George Michael Edward Hollingbery was born on 12 October 1963. He was educated at Radley College before studying at Lady Margaret Hall, Oxford for a BA in human sciences which he was awarded by the University of Oxford in 1985. He then gained an MBA from the Wharton School, University of Pennsylvania, US.

Hollingbery's earlier career was spent investing in and starting up businesses, the best known of which was veterinary chain Companion Care, sold to Pets at Home in 2002. In 2005, he began a property investment business, run from his Alresford home.

Hollingbery was elected to Winchester City Council in 1999, becoming deputy leader in 2006. Hollingbery stood in Winchester in the 2005 general election, having managed the previous candidate's campaign in 2001, but was defeated by Liberal Democrat Mark Oaten.

== Parliamentary career ==
In the 2010 general election, Hollingbery contested the new constituency of Meon Valley in Hampshire, created as a result of boundary changes. He was elected with a majority of 12,125. He was re-elected in 2015 and 2017 with majorities of 23,913 and 25,692 respectively.

Hollingbery subsequently served on the Speaker's Advisory Committee on Works of Art and the Communities and Local Government Committee.

In parliament, Hollingbery was a close ally of Maidenhead MP Theresa May. He supported her candidature in the 2016 Conservative leadership election. He also served twice as her Parliamentary Private Secretary, first in her role as Home Secretary from 2012 to 2015 and then as Prime Minister from 2016 to 2018.

Hollingbery was interviewed for the 2017 documentary Theresa vs. Boris: How May Became PM, in which he was also portrayed by Daniel Casey in dramatisations.

Hollingbery was appointed a Knight Commander of the Order of St Michael and St George (KCMG) in Theresa May's resignation honours on 10 September 2019.

On 7 November 2019, Hollingbery announced he would not contest the 2019 general election. He added he supported Boris Johnson's Brexit withdrawal agreement but wanted to pursue career opportunities outside parliament. He was succeeded as MP for Meon Valley by Flick Drummond.

== Ambassador to Cuba ==
In January 2021 it was announced that Hollingbery would be appointed as Her Majesty's Ambassador to the Republic of Cuba with effect from early 2022. He presented President Miguel Díaz-Canel his letter of credence on 11 February 2022. His tenure in this position ended in March 2025, where he was succeeded by Mr James Hooley OBE.

== Personal life ==
Hollingbery is married to Janette, originally from America. They have three children together. A horticulture hobbyist, his garden has been featured on the television programme Gardeners' World.

Parliament of the United Kingdom
New constituency	Member of Parliament for Meon Valley; 2010–2019	Succeeded by Flick Drummond
