= Meon Valley (constituency) =

UK Parliament constituency (2010–2024)

Coordinates: 50.900°N 1.024°W

- Former county constituency for the House of Commons
- Boundary of Meon Valley in Hampshire for the 2010 general election

- Location of Hampshire within England
- County: Hampshire
- Electorate: 71,291 (December 2010)
- Major settlements: Bishop's Waltham, Waterlooville, Wickham, Rowland's Castle

2010–2024
- Seats: One
- Created from: East Hampshire, Havant, Winchester
- Replaced by: Fareham and Waterlooville

Meon Valley (/ˈmiːɒn/) was a constituency (Note: A county constituency (for the purposes of election expenses and type of returning officer).) in Hampshire represented in the House of Commons of the UK Parliament. The seat was held from its 2010 creation by George Hollingbery and from 2019 to 2024 by Flick Drummond, both of the Conservative Party. (Note: As with all current constituencies, the constituency elected one Member of Parliament (MP) by the first past the post system of election at least every five years.)

Further to the completion of the 2023 Periodic Review of Westminster constituencies, the constituency was abolished and divided between three new seats. The bulk of the constituency namely Waterlooville and the surrounding villages were moved to Fareham and Waterlooville. Horndean was moved to East Hampshire, offsetting losses moved into the new cross-county Surrey seat of Farnham and Bordon. Other western areas moved into Winchester and Hamble Valley.

== Constituency profile ==
Meon Valley was a generally rural constituency, and an affluent safe seat for the Conservatives. The largest towns in the constituency are Waterlooville and Horndean.

Output areas in the area in 2001 displayed higher than average incomes overall compared to the national average. In the 2011 census, incidence of home ownership and incidence of semi-detached and detached properties all exceeded the national average and were some of the highest figures for the region.

== Boundaries ==
Map of boundaries 2010–2024

The seat was formed in 2010 by the Boundary Commission for England as an extra constituency in Hampshire, with electoral wards from the East Hampshire, Havant and Winchester constituencies.

- From East Hampshire – the wards of Clanfield and Finchdean, Horndean Catherington and Lovedean, Horndean Downs, Horndean Hazleton and Blendworth, Horndean Kings, Horndean Murray and Rowlands Castle
- From Havant – the wards of Cowplain, Hart Plain and Waterloo
- From Winchester – the wards of Bishops Waltham, Boarhunt and Southwick, Cheriton and Bishops Sutton, Denmead, Droxford, Soberton and Hambledon, Owslebury and Curdridge, Shedfield, Swanmore and Newtown, Upper Meon Valley, Whiteley and Wickham

The 2023 Periodic Review of Westminster constituencies proposed to break up the Meon Valley constituency, with the parliamentary constituencies of Winchester, Fareham and Waterlooville and East Hampshire taking over areas of the constituency. The plans went through Parliament by July 2023.

== History ==
When created, the notional result was based on ward data from the previous seats' general election results. The constituency took in territory from the then Liberal Democrat-held Winchester and Conservative-held East Hampshire with uncertain swing between the two parties. Estimates were that the Conservative majority if the seat had existed in 2005 would have been around 2,000 votes. At the 2010 election however, the seat saw one of the largest Liberal Democrat to Conservative swings (9.4%), and the Conservative candidate George Hollingbery was elected with a majority of over 23%.

The seat became even safer thereafter, returning Conservative majorities of over 40% at each of the 2015, 2017 and 2019 general elections, being among the safest Conservative seats in the country in each case. In 2019, Hollingbery stepped down to be succeeded by Flick Drummond, who had been MP for Portsmouth South from 2015 to 2017. She served only one term in the seat prior to its abolition.

== Abolition ==
Further to the completion of the 2023 Periodic Review of Westminster constituencies, the seat was abolished prior to the 2024 general election, with its contents distributed four ways:

- The town of Waterlooville, together with the villages of Denmead, Southwick and Wickham, included in the new constituency of Fareham and Waterlooville
- Horndean transferred to East Hampshire
- The City of Winchester ward of Whiteley and Shedfield included in the new constituency of Hamble Valley
- Remaining, largely rural areas, including the town of Bishop's Waltham, transferred to Winchester

== Members of Parliament ==
Election	Member	Party
2010	Sir George Hollingbery	Conservative
2019	Flick Drummond	Conservative

== Elections ==
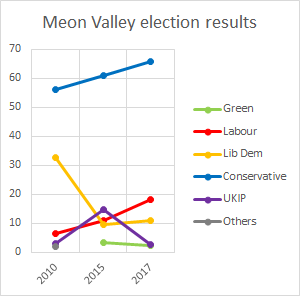
Meon Valley elections

=== Elections in the 2010s ===
General election 2019: Meon Valley
Party	Candidate	Votes	%	±%
Conservative	Flick Drummond	35,271	64.3	−1.4
Liberal Democrats	Lewis North	11,716	21.4	+10.5
Labour	Matthew Bunday	5,644	10.3	−8.0
Green	Malcolm Wallace	2,198	4.0	+1.6
Majority		23,555	42.9	−4.5
Turnout		54,829	72.4	−0.7
Conservative hold		Swing		

General election 2017: Meon Valley
Party	Candidate	Votes	%	±%
Conservative	George Hollingbery	35,624	65.7	+4.6
Labour	Sheena King	9,932	18.3	+7.4
Liberal Democrats	Martin Tod	5,900	10.9	+1.3
UKIP	Paul Bailey	1,435	2.6	−12.2
Green	Andrew Hayward	1,301	2.4	−1.1
Majority		25,692	47.4	+1.1
Turnout		54,192	73.0	+1.9
Conservative hold		Swing	−1.4	

General election 2015: Meon Valley
Party	Candidate	Votes	%	±%
Conservative	George Hollingbery	31,578	61.1	+4.9
UKIP	David Alexander	7,665	14.8	+11.9
Labour	Gemma McKenna	5,656	10.9	+4.5
Liberal Democrats	Chris Carrigan	4,987	9.6	−23.0
Green	Diana Wellings (a.k.a. Diana Korchien)	1,831	3.5	New
Majority		23,913	46.3	+22.7
Turnout		51,717	71.1	−1.6
Conservative hold		Swing	−3.5	

General election 2010: Meon Valley
Party	Candidate	Votes	%	±%
Conservative	George Hollingbery	28,818	56.2	+10.4
Liberal Democrats	Liz Leffman	16,693	32.6	−8.4
Labour	Howard Linsley	3,266	6.4	−4.2
UKIP	Steve Harris	1,490	2.9	+0.4
English Democrat	Pat Harris	582	1.1	New
Animal Protection	Sarah Coats	255	0.5	New
Independent	Graeme Quar	134	0.3	New
Majority		12,125	23.6	+18.7
Turnout		51,238	72.7	+1.5
Conservative hold		Swing	+9.4	

== See also ==
- List of parliamentary constituencies in Hampshire
