= List of King George V Playing Fields in England =

This is a list of King George's Fields in England, split by county.

== Bedfordshire ==
Bedfordshire
Location	Formal name	Local name (if any)	National Grid Reference	Dates		External links
Location	Formal name	Local name (if any)	National Grid Reference	Purchase	Opening	External links
Clapham	King George's Field		TL029526	1944		
Langford	King George's Field	Playing Field/ Park	TL184412	1949		

== Cumbria ==
Cumbria
Location	Formal name	Local name (if any)	National Grid Reference	Dates		External links
Location	Formal name	Local name (if any)	National Grid Reference	Purchase	Opening	External links
Appleby-in-Westmorland	King George's Field	Broad Close	NY682204		25 August 1956	King George V playground - Westmorland and Furness Council
Patterdale	King George V Field,	n/a	NY390160			

== Derbyshire ==
Derbyshire
Location	Formal name	Local name (if any)	National Grid Reference	Dates		External links
Location	Formal name	Local name (if any)	National Grid Reference	Purchase	Opening	External links
Oddfellows Road Hathersage	King George V Field	Swimming Pool/Playing Field/Bowling Green	SK232813	1935/36		

== Devon ==
Devon
Location	Formal name	Local name (if any)	National Grid Reference	Dates		External links
Location	Formal name	Local name (if any)	National Grid Reference	Purchase	Opening	External links
Bideford	King George's Field Football Ground	n/a	SS455271			Provisional Audit of Open Space, Sport, & Recreation Provision (Torridge)
Moretonhampstead	Moretonhampstead Playing Fields	n/a	SX753860			King George V Playing Fields Trust Registered Charity No. 300904
Northam	Bideford Rugby Football Ground	n/a	SS456272			Provisional Audit of Open Space, Sport, & Recreation Provision (Torridge)

== Dorset ==
Dorset
Location	Formal name	Local name (if any)	National Grid Reference	Dates		External links
Location	Formal name	Local name (if any)	National Grid Reference	Purchase	Opening	External links
Bournemouth	King's Park, Boscombe	n/a	SZ117929			Dorset Echo
Ferndown	King George V Playing Field	n/a	SU070004			View looking south
Swanage	King George's Playing Fields	n/a	SZ024790			Swanage Railway History

== East Riding of Yorkshire ==
East Riding of Yorkshire
Location	Formal name	Local name (if any)	National Grid Reference	Dates		External links
Location	Formal name	Local name (if any)	National Grid Reference	Purchase	Opening	External links
Cottingham	King George V Playing Fields	n/a	TA044334			Cottingham Playsport Pavilion

== East Sussex ==
East Sussex
Location	Formal name	Local name (if any)	National Grid Reference	Dates		External links
Location	Formal name	Local name (if any)	National Grid Reference	Purchase	Opening	External links
Newick	King George V Playing Field	n/a	TQ 416 215			Mid Sussex news - Newick

== Hampshire ==
Hampshire
Location	Formal name	Local name (if any)	National Grid Reference	Dates		External links
Location	Formal name	Local name (if any)	National Grid Reference	Purchase	Opening	External links
Cosham	King George's Field	King George V Playing Fields	SU657052			King George V Playing Fields, Cosham
Denmead	King George's Field	Recreation Ground	SU655118			Whitely Parish Council Minutes

== Leicestershire ==
Leicestershire
Location	Formal name	Local name (if any)	National Grid Reference	Dates		External links
Location	Formal name	Local name (if any)	National Grid Reference	Purchase	Opening	External links
Higham on the Hill	King George V Playing Field		SP380956			

== Merseyside ==
Merseyside
Location	Formal name	Local name (if any)	National Grid Reference	Dates		External links
Location	Formal name	Local name (if any)	National Grid Reference	Purchase	Opening	External links
Huyton	King George V Memorial Playing Fields	The Georgie's	SJ449919			UK Running Track Directory

== Norfolk ==
Norfolk
Location	Formal name	Local name (if any)	National Grid Reference	Dates		External links
Location	Formal name	Local name (if any)	National Grid Reference	Purchase	Opening	External links
Holt	King George's Field	n/a	TG078392			Holt Town Council
Caister-on-Sea	King George V Playing Field	n/a				Gt Yarmouth Borough Council

== North Yorkshire ==
North Yorkshire
Location	Formal name	Local name (if any)	National Grid Reference	Dates		External links
Location	Formal name	Local name (if any)	National Grid Reference	Purchase	Opening	External links
Guisborough	King George V Playing Fields	n/a	NZ606162			home to Guisborough Town FC and Guisborough Swimming Pool

== Nottinghamshire ==
Nottinghamshire
Location	Formal name	Local name (if any)	National Grid Reference	Dates		External links
Location	Formal name	Local name (if any)	National Grid Reference	Purchase	Opening	External links
Arnold	King George V Playing Field	Arnold Recreation Ground	SK587452	1950		Charity Commission: Enquiry into Arnold
Aspley, Nottingham	King George V Playing Fields	-	SK528419			New look playing area for King George V

== Tyne and Wear ==
Tyne and Wear, England
Location	Formal name	Local name (if any)	National Grid Reference	Dates		External links
Location	Formal name	Local name (if any)	National Grid Reference	Purchase	Opening	External links
Sunderland	King George Playing Field	n/a				Sunderland City Council

== West Midlands ==
West Midlands
Location	Formal name	Local name (if any)	National Grid Reference	Dates		External links
Location	Formal name	Local name (if any)	National Grid Reference	Purchase	Opening	External links
Bloxwich	King George's Fields		SJ 9983 0289			Article in Bloxwich telegraph
Wednesfield	King George V Memorial Park		SJ 944 007			

== West Sussex ==
West Sussex
Location	Formal name	Local name (if any)	National Grid Reference	Dates		External links
Location	Formal name	Local name (if any)	National Grid Reference	Purchase	Opening	External links
Crawley Down	King George V Playing Field	n/a	TQ345375			Village Website
East Grinstead	King Georges Field	n/a (image)	TQ392385			Mid Sussex District Council - Search for pitches and pavilions
Felpham	King George V Recreation Ground	KG	SU959000			Felpham Parish Council Minutes

== Wiltshire ==
Wiltshire
Location	Formal name	Local name (if any)	National Grid Reference	Dates		External links
Location	Formal name	Local name (if any)	National Grid Reference	Purchase	Opening	External links
Melksham	King George V Playing Field		ST905641			King George V Playing Field (Melksham)

== Worcestershire ==
Worcestershire
Location	Formal name	Local name (if any)	National Grid Reference	Dates		External links
Location	Formal name	Local name (if any)	National Grid Reference	Purchase	Opening	External links
Worcester	King George's Fields	n/a	SO862562			Entrance to King George's Fields
