= Denmead =

Village and parish in Hampshire, England

Coordinates: 50.9050°N 1.0648°W

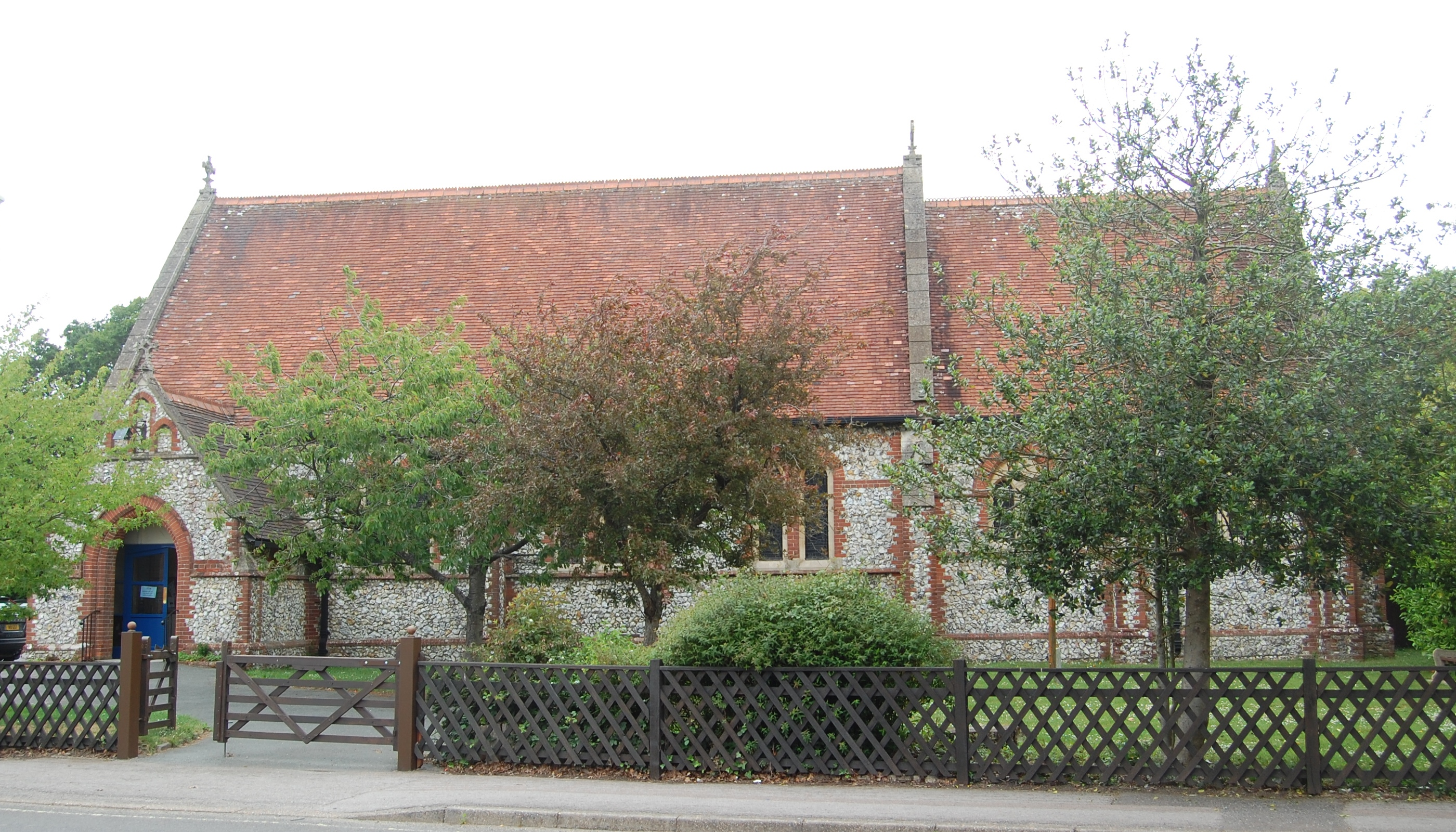
- All Saints Church, Denmead

- Location within Hampshire
- Population: 6,736 (2011 census)
- OS grid reference: SU658121
- Civil parish: Denmead
- District: City of Winchester
- Shire county: Hampshire
- Region: South East
- Country: England
- Sovereign state: United Kingdom
- Post town: Waterlooville
- Postcode district: PO7
- Dialling code: 023
- Police: Hampshire and Isle of Wight
- Fire: Hampshire and Isle of Wight
- Ambulance: South Central
- UK Parliament: Fareham and Waterlooville

Parish and ward boundaries of Denmead Parish in the Borough of City of Winchester, Hampshire, following the 2016 boundary changes.

Denmead is a village in Hampshire near Portsmouth, England. It is part of the City of Winchester district. As of 2005, it had a population of 6,457 and an electorate of 4,987. At the 2011 census the population had increased to 6,736. As of 2021, this had decreased to 6,505.

== History ==
In 1316, Denmead was owned by the Bishop of Winchester, who leased it to various tenants. It became referred to as a manor in 1449, when it was owned by William Wayte. When Wayte's grandson died, the lands were divided amongst various other members of the family and Denmead was passed down.

The village is shown in the Hambledon Hundred on John Speed's map of Hampshire which was published in 1611. After some time the property became further divided as it was split between different owners because it was inherited down multiple generations. This occurred frequently until 1831 when Henry Kennett became its owner. There was no further mention of Denmead Manor until 1908, when the Ecclesiastical Commissioners were its Lords of the Manor.

Originally part of the ecclesiastical parish of Hambledon, the village was known as Barn Green. Denmead was once a widely dispersed village which included the hamlets of Worlds End, Furzeley, Anmore, Denmead Mill and Barn Green. It achieved its own identity with the creation of the new parish of All Saints in 1880, and has since become more densely packed as it filled with more modern properties.

The village became well known in the 19th century as a venue for cockfighting.

The civil parish of Denmead in its current form was created in 1932 from the lower southern end of Hambledon Parish.

In the run up to D-Day many American and Canadian troops, including US General Dwight D. Eisenhower, camped under the cover of local forests. Nearby Creech Wood also housed a prisoner of war camp, some remains of which can still be found in the undergrowth.

== Geography ==
The village is next to part of the Forest of Bere, and rural farm land. The 'gap' between Waterlooville is gradually being reduced, but Denmead is currently a rural village, although it has had much housing development in recent years with more to come. The majority of the recent development has been conducted by the company Taylor Wimpey, with McAlpine present in late 1980s/early 1990s.

Denmead addresses have Waterlooville postal addresses (Waterlooville is in turn part of Havant) and is considered to be a village attached to Waterlooville by Hampshire County Council. Waterlooville is about 3 km away from Denmead.

== Economy ==
Within the village, there is a chemist, an estate agents, a vet, a barbers, Southern Financial Services and a hardware store/ironmongers.

== Culture and community ==
There is a memorial hall, built in the 1920s as a memorial to those killed in the Great War, and held in trust by the Parish Council. A Community Centre is run by Denmead Community Association. Denmead also has a fitness trail which stretches around half of the village, created to mark the Golden Jubilee of 2002. Adjacent to King George's Field is a Pavilion. The Pavilion is home to Denmead Day Care, a small local nursery, and is also the headquarters of Denmead Youth Group.

The Denmead Youth Theatre is split into two groups, the drama group for ages 7–12 and the youth theatre for 12- to 18-year-olds, with all groups are run by emerging theatre directors associated with the Theatre Royal, Winchester. Over the last few years the groups have performed numerous performances in professional theatres and in a variety of genres, including "the short history of Denmead" with the help of the Denmead Village Association and members of the local community.

Denmead is twinned with St Georges Les Baillargeaux, located in the region of Poitou-Charentes, France. Saint Georges is a village with a population of 3,500 residents which is approximately half the population of Denmead located about 5 miles from Poitiers.

1st Denmead Scout group have a scout hut and field just outside the village centre.

== Education ==
There are two schools, Denmead Infant School, which takes children 4–7 and has around 255 pupils, and Denmead Junior School, which takes children 7–11 and has around 290 pupils.

== Religious sites ==
The parish church is All Saints' Church, which is constructed of flint with brick quoins and Bath stone window surrounds. The church was extended in the 1990s to accommodate a growing congregation, and a major upgrade was carried out to the adjacent church hall as part of the same project.

== Sport ==
Denmead has a King George's Field in memorial to King George V where the village cricket, football, tennis and bowls clubs are based. In recent years, a village skate park has also been constructed in King George's playing field to provide more leisure activities for young persons. The playground on King George's Playing field was refurbished and rebuilt in 2013, creating a popular park for both locals and those from further afield who travel to the village to use it.

Denmead is home to the Denmead Striders, a running club with over 100 members of a wide range of abilities. Denmead also has a brass band which is currently in the Second Section in national grading.

TS Alacrity Junior Cadet Corps has been running in the village since 1992, meeting at the Denmead War Memorial Hall. Catering for boys and girls aged between 7½ and 18 years, the unit is a self funded charity.

Denmead Cricket Club fields two teams in the Hampshire Cricket League, and also has a Sunday team playing friendly matches. The club plays its home matches at King George V playing fields.

Denmead Tennis Club is located on King George V playing field and has been hosting coaching sessions and tournaments for 60 years (as of 2024).

Ville Bowmen, is a target archery club in Demand. They shoot out doors during the summer, adjacent to the scout hut in Kidmore Lane. During the winter months they shoot indoors in the memorial hall. The club often turn out for public have a go events at the village show and fetes.

Denmead is home to Denmead Football Club who are thought to have first formed in the 1930s, with earliest definitive records from 1953 to 1954. Youth and adult teams train and play matches King George Playing Fields. Boys and girls of all ages train on Saturday mornings.
