= Preseli Pembrokeshire (UK Parliament constituency) =

UK Parliament constituency (1997–2024)

- Former county constituency for the House of Commons
- Boundary of Preseli Pembrokeshire in Wales
- Preserved county: Dyfed
- Electorate: 58,343 (December 2010)
- Major settlements: Haverfordwest, Milford Haven, Fishguard, St Davids.

1997–2024
- Seats: One
- Created from: Ceredigion and Pembroke North, Pembroke
- Replaced by: Ceredigion Preseli, Mid and South Pembrokeshire
- Senedd: Preseli Pembrokeshire, Mid and West Wales

Preseli Pembrokeshire (Welsh: Preseli Sir Benfro) was a seat and constituency of the House of Commons of the Parliament of the United Kingdom. (Note: As in all seats since the mid-20th century abolition of University Seats, it elects one Member of Parliament (MP) by the first past the post system of election.)

The Preseli Pembrokeshire Senedd constituency was created with the same boundaries in 1999.

Its last MP, who held the seat since 2005, was the Conservative Stephen Crabb, who was Secretary of State for Work and Pensions (Work and Pensions Secretary) from March to July 2016. The seat was held by Labour's candidate from its creation in 1997 until 2005. The Labour and Conservative parties have won at least 27.7% of the vote apiece since its 1997 creation, with the next-placed parties having reached a maximum of 14.5% of the vote to date in a generally broad field.

The seat attracted five candidates in 2010, eight in 2015 (an election in which five of the deposits were refunded and three lost) and seven in 2017. At the 2017 election, Crabb's majority was the 27th closest out of the 650 Commons seats, 0.8% or 314 votes. In 2019, there were four candidates; Crabb retained the seat with an increased majority.

The constituency was abolished as part of the 2023 Periodic Review of Westminster constituencies and under the June 2023 final recommendations of the Boundary Commission for Wales for the 2024 United Kingdom general election. Its wards were split between Ceredigion Preseli and Mid and South Pembrokeshire.

== Constituency profile ==
The seat was predominantly rural with both Welsh and English speaking areas. Milford Haven has a significant port and oil industry, and tourism is also a key sector due to the Pembrokeshire Coast National Park. The seat was less affluent than the UK average.

== Boundaries ==
Map of boundaries 2010-2024

The constituency was created in 1997 from parts of the seats of Ceredigion and Pembroke North and Pembroke. It comprises the north and west coasts of Pembrokeshire and areas inland, including the Preseli Hills in the north of the county. It was the most westerly constituency in Wales. Much of the coastal area was in the Pembrokeshire Coast National Park.

On its creation in 1997, its boundaries were co-terminous with the then District of Preseli Pembrokeshire. Since the 2006 boundary review of Welsh parliamentary constituencies, which took effect at the 2010 general election, it consists of the Pembrokeshire County electoral divisions of: Burton; Camrose; Cilgerran; Clydau; Crymych; Dinas Cross; Fishguard North East; Fishguard North West; Goodwick; Haverfordwest Castle; Haverfordwest Garth; Haverfordwest Portfield; Haverfordwest Prendergast; Haverfordwest Priory; Johnston; Letterston; Llangwm; Llanrhian; Maenclochog; Merlin's Bridge; Milford Central; Milford East; Milford Hakin; Milford Hubberston; Milford North; Milford West; Newport; Neyland East; Neyland West; Rudbaxton; St David's; St Dogmaels; St Ishmael's; Scleddau; Solva; The Havens; and Wiston.

== Members of Parliament ==
Election	Candidate	Party
1997	Jackie Lawrence	Labour
2005	Stephen Crabb	Conservative
2024	Constituency abolished	

== Elections ==
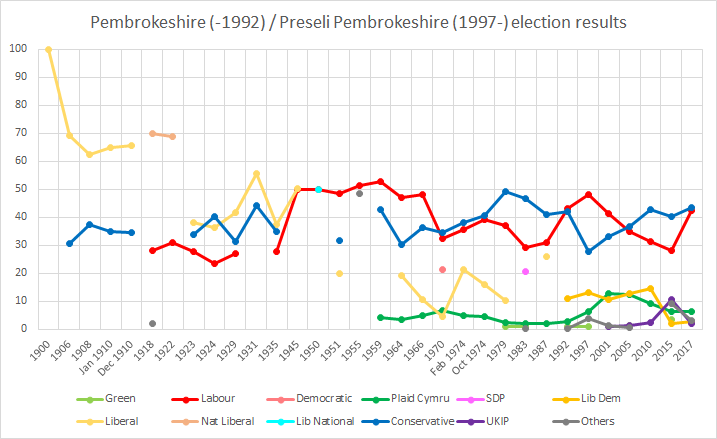
Pembrokeshire election history

=== Elections in the 1990s ===
General election 1997: Preseli Pembrokeshire
Party	Candidate	Votes	%	±%
Labour	Jackie Lawrence	20,477	48.3	N/A
Conservative	Robert Buckland	11,741	27.7	N/A
Liberal Democrats	Jeffrey Clarke	5,527	13.0	N/A
Plaid Cymru	Alun Jones	2,683	6.3	N/A
Referendum	David Berry	1,574	3.7	N/A
Green	Molly Scott Cato	401	0.9	N/A
Majority		8,736	20.6	N/A
Turnout		42,403	78.3	N/A
Registered electors		54,150		
Labour win (new seat)				

=== Elections in the 2000s ===
General election 2001: Preseli Pembrokeshire
Party	Candidate	Votes	%	±%
Labour	Jackie Lawrence	15,206	41.3	−7.0
Conservative	Stephen Crabb	12,260	33.3	+5.6
Plaid Cymru	Rhys Sinnett	4,658	12.7	+6.4
Liberal Democrats	Alexander Dauncey	3,882	10.6	−2.4
Socialist Labour	Patricia Bowen	452	1.2	N/A
UKIP	Hugh Jones	319	0.9	N/A
Majority		2,946	8.0	−12.6
Turnout		36,777	67.8	−10.5
Registered electors		54,283		
Labour hold		Swing	-6.3	

General election 2005: Preseli Pembrokeshire
Party	Candidate	Votes	%	±%
Conservative	Stephen Crabb	14,106	36.6	+3.3
Labour	Sue Hayman	13,499	35.0	−6.3
Liberal Democrats	Dewi Smith	4,963	12.9	+2.3
Plaid Cymru	Matt Mathias	4,752	12.3	−0.4
UKIP	James Carver	498	1.3	+0.4
Green	Molly Scott Cato	494	1.3	N/A
Socialist Labour	Patricia Bowen	275	0.7	−0.5
Majority		607	1.6	N/A
Turnout		38,587	69.5	+1.7
Registered electors		55,502		
Conservative gain from Labour		Swing	+4.8	

=== Elections in the 2010s ===
General election 2010: Preseli Pembrokeshire
Party	Candidate	Votes	%	±%
Conservative	Stephen Crabb	16,994	42.8	+6.4
Labour	Mari Rees	12,339	31.2	−3.7
Liberal Democrats	Nick Tregoning	5,759	14.5	+1.5
Plaid Cymru	Henry Jones-Davies	3,654	9.2	−3.3
UKIP	Richard Lawson	906	2.3	+1.0
Majority		4,605	11.6	+10.0
Turnout		39,602	69.0	−1.0
Registered electors		57,400		
Conservative hold		Swing	+5.0	

General election 2015: Preseli Pembrokeshire
Party	Candidate	Votes	%	±%
Conservative	Stephen Crabb	16,383	40.4	−2.4
Labour	Paul Miller	11,414	28.1	−3.1
UKIP	Howard Lillyman	4,257	10.5	+8.2
Independent	Chris Overton	3,729	9.2	N/A
Plaid Cymru	John Osmond	2,518	6.2	−3.0
Green	Frances Bryant	1,452	3.6	N/A
Liberal Democrats	Nick Tregoning	780	1.9	−12.6
The New Society of Worth	Rodney Maile	23	0.1	N/A
Majority		4,969	12.3	+0.7
Turnout		40,556	70.7	+1.7
Registered electors		57,291		
Conservative hold		Swing	+0.3	

General election 2017: Preseli Pembrokeshire
Party	Candidate	Votes	%	±%
Conservative	Stephen Crabb	18,302	43.4	+3.0
Labour	Philippa Thompson	17,988	42.6	+14.5
Plaid Cymru	Owain Llŷr Williams	2,711	6.4	+0.2
Independent	Chris Overton	1,209	2.9	−6.3
Liberal Democrats	Bob Kilmister	1,106	2.6	+0.7
UKIP	Susan Bale	850	2.0	−8.5
The New Society of Worth	Rodney Maile	31	0.1	±0.0
Majority		314	0.8	−11.5
Turnout		42,197	72.1	+1.4
Registered electors		58,555		
Conservative hold		Swing	-5.7	

General election 2019: Preseli Pembrokeshire
Party	Candidate	Votes	%	±%
Conservative	Stephen Crabb	21,381	50.4	+7.0
Labour	Philippa Thompson	16,319	38.5	−4.1
Plaid Cymru	Cris Tomos	2,776	6.5	+0.1
Liberal Democrats	Thomas Hughes	1,943	4.6	+2.0
Rejected ballots		153		
Majority		5,062	11.9	+11.1
Turnout		42,419	71.2	−0.9
Registered electors		59,586		
Conservative hold		Swing	+5.6	

Of the 153 rejected ballots:

- 119 were either unmarked or it was uncertain who the vote was for.
- 34 voted for more than one candidate.

== See also ==
- Preseli Pembrokeshire (Senedd constituency)
- List of parliamentary constituencies in Dyfed
- List of parliamentary constituencies in Wales
