= Flick Drummond =

British politician (born 1962)

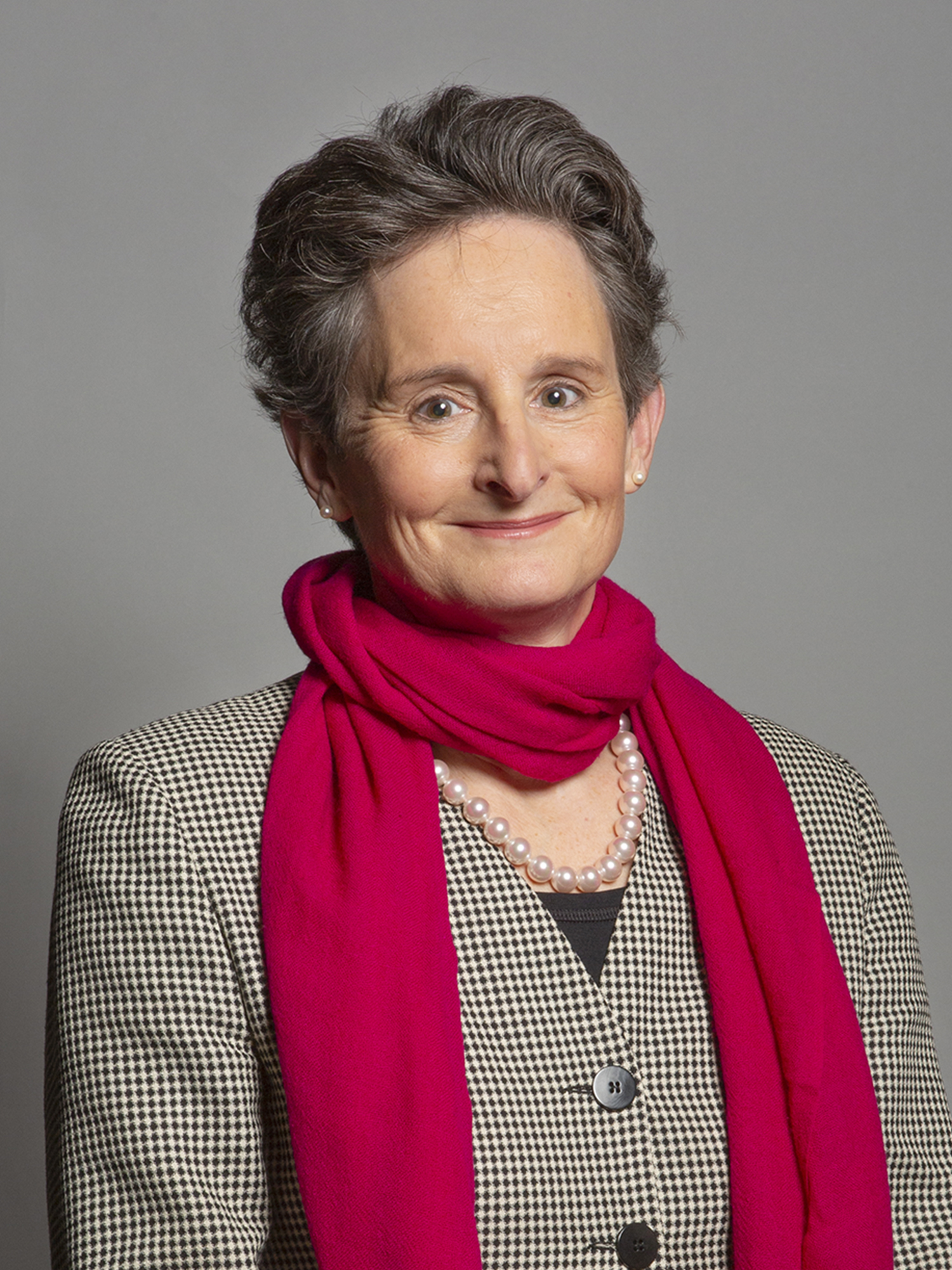
- Official portrait, 2019

Member of Parliament for Meon Valley
- In office 12 December 2019 – 30 May 2024
- Preceded by: George Hollingbery
- Succeeded by: Constituency abolished

Member of Parliament for Portsmouth South
- In office 7 May 2015 – 3 May 2017
- Preceded by: Mike Hancock
- Succeeded by: Stephen Morgan

Personal details
- Born: Felicia Jane Beatrix Shepherd; 16 June 1962 (age 63) Aden, Aden Protectorate (now Yemen)
- Party: Conservative
- Spouse: Hereward Drummond
- Children: 4
- Education: Roedean School, East Sussex
- Alma mater: University of Hull; University of Southampton
- Website: www.flickdrummond.com

Military service
- Allegiance: United Kingdom
- Branch/service: Territorial Army; Intelligence Corps

Felicia Jane "Flick" Beatrix Drummond (née Shepherd; born 16 June 1962) is a British Conservative Party politician. She was the Member of Parliament (MP) for Meon Valley from 2019 until 2024, having previously represented Portsmouth South from 2015 to 2017.

== Early life ==
Drummond was born on 16 June 1962 in Aden, then part of the Aden Protectorate. She is the daughter of diplomat George Anthony Shepherd (1931–1996), who had served in the 4th Royal Tank Regiment, Trucial Oman Scouts, and 2nd Royal Tank Regiment, and Sarah Eirlys, née Adamson. She was educated at Roedean School, before studying at both Hull University and Southampton University. Drummond is also a graduate of the Royal College of Defence Studies and has completed two terms on the Armed Forces Parliamentary Scheme

== Political career ==
Drummond sat on Winchester City Council from 1996 to 2000, before being expelled from the council after failing to attend a meeting for six months. During this time, she moved to the United States.

Drummond returned to the UK in 2004, and was selected to stand for Parliament in Southampton Itchen in the 2005 general election, where she won 26.8% of the vote and came second behind the incumbent Labour MP John Denham. At the 2010 general election, Drummond stood for Parliament in Portsmouth South, where she won 33.3% of the vote and came second behind the incumbent Liberal Democrat MP Mike Hancock.

At the 2015 general election, Drummond contested Portsmouth South again, and was elected to Parliament, winning 34.8% of the vote and a majority of 5,241 over the Liberal Democrats' Gerald Vernon-Jackson. From 2015 to 2017, Drummond was a member of the Women and Equalities Committee.

Drummond campaigned to remain in the European Union in the 2016 Referendum. She stated in 2016 that the referendum result diminished and would lessen Britain's influence in Europe.

At the 2017 general election, Drummond was defeated in Portsmouth South by Labour's Stephen Morgan, coming second with 37.6% of the vote.

In October 2018, Drummond was elected Voluntary Director of the Conservative Policy Forum by the National Conservative Convention.

In November 2019, Drummond was selected as the prospective parliamentary candidate for the safe Conservative seat of Meon Valley to replace the retiring incumbent George Hollingbery. At the 2019 general election, she was elected as MP for Meon Valley with 64.3% of the vote and a majority of 23,555. As a consequence she stood down as the Conservative candidate for Hampshire at the 2020 England and Wales police and crime commissioner elections.

Between February and September 2020 Drummond served as Parliamentary Private Secretary to Anne-Marie Trevelyan as Secretary of State for International Development before becoming PPS to Thérèse Coffey at the Department for Work and Pensions. In October 2022, Drummond was appointed to the Commons Public Accounts Committee and the Education Select Committee.

As a result the 2023 Periodic Review of Westminster constituencies, her Meon Valley constituency was dissolved ahead of the 2024 general election, with its territory divided between several new or revised constituencies, and not forming the majority or largest segment of any new constituency. On 5 April 2023, she faced a vote of local party members to become the candidate for the new seat of Fareham and Waterlooville, which took in the largest segment (45.7%) of her dismembered Meon Valley constituency; her opponent and then Home Secretary Suella Braverman, whose Fareham constituency formed the (slight) majority of the new seat. Braverman won the vote by 77 votes to 54.

In July 2023, Drummond was selected to contest the 2024 general election as the Conservative candidate for the redrawn Winchester constituency, which had its boundaries changed to include slightly less than a quarter of Drummond's abolished Meon Valley seat. The election took place on 4 July 2024; she lost to Liberal Democrat Danny Chambers by a margin of 13,821 votes (24.2%).

== Personal life ==
In 1987, she married Heneage Drummond with whom she has four children and three grandchildren. Before entering politics, Drummond was a lay inspector for Ofsted. She has also served as Chair of Governors at Milton Park Primary School and a trustee of Salterns Academy Trust in Portsmouth. She presented the Portsmouth Youth Voice Awards in 2017.

== Publications ==
- No Blame Game – The Future for Children's Social Workers for the Conservative Party Commission on Social Workers (October 2007)
- Women Returners, Annual report for Women and Work APPG (2016)
- Brexit and Beyond edited by George Freeman MP – chapter on Coastal Communities (2019)
- The Future of Education, One Nation Conservatives (2020)

Parliament of the United Kingdom
Preceded by Mike Hancock	Member of Parliament for Portsmouth South; 2015–2017	Succeeded by Stephen Morgan
Preceded by George Hollingbery	Member of Parliament for Meon Valley; 2019–2024	Succeeded by Constituency abolished
