= Fareham and Waterlooville =

UK Parliament constituency (since 2024)

Coordinates: 50.88°N 1.13°W

- County constituency for the House of Commons
- Interactive map of boundaries from 2024
- Boundary of Fareham and Waterlooville in South East England
- County: Hampshire
- Electorate: 77,036 (2023)
- Major settlements: Fareham; Waterlooville; Portchester

Current constituency
- Created: 2024
- Member of Parliament: Suella Braverman (Reform UK)
- Seats: One
- Created from: Fareham; Meon Valley

Fareham and Waterlooville is a constituency in Hampshire represented in the House of Commons of the UK Parliament. It was first contested at the 2024 general election, when Suella Braverman of the Conservative Party was elected as its Member of Parliament (MP). Braverman was first elected as an MP in 2015, representing the former constituency of Fareham. She defected to Reform UK in January 2026.

== Constituency profile ==
The Fareham and Waterlooville constituency is located in Hampshire and forms part of the South Hampshire conurbation. It covers the towns of Fareham and Waterlooville and the villages of Portchester, Denmead, Cowplain and Wickham. The constituency is generally suburban and affluent. It contains Portus Adurni, the best-preserved Roman fort north of the Alps. House prices in the constituency are similar to the national average.

In general, residents of the constituency are older and have high incomes, and levels of education and professional employment are similar to the rest of the country. White people made up 96% of the population at the 2021 census. At the local council level, eastern Fareham, Portchester and the rural areas to their north are mostly represented by Liberal Democrats, whilst Waterlooville and western Fareham elected Conservatives. An estimated 57% of residents supported leaving the European Union in the 2016 referendum, higher than the nationwide figure of 52%.

== Boundaries ==
Under the 2023 periodic review of Westminster constituencies, the constituency was defined as comprising the following, as they existed on 1 December 2020:

- The Borough of Fareham wards of Fareham East, Fareham North, Fareham North-West, Fareham South, Fareham West, Portchester East, and Portchester West.
- The Borough of Havant wards of Cowplain, Hart Plain, and Waterloo.
- The City of Winchester wards of Denmead, and Southwick & Wickham.

Following a local government boundary review in Fareham which became effective in May 2024, the constituency now comprises the following with effect from the 2024 general election:

- The Borough of Fareham wards of: Avenue (majority); Fareham Park; Fareham Town; Fort Fareham; Portchester Castle; Portchester Wincor; Uplands & Funtley; Wallington & Downend; and a small part of Titchfield ward.
- The Borough of Havant wards of: Cowplain; Hart Plain; Waterloo.
- The City of Winchester wards of: Denmead; Southwick & Wickham.

It comprises the following areas:

- The town of Fareham and village of Portchester from the former constituency of Fareham
- The town of Waterlooville, together with the villages of Denmead, Southwick and Wickham, from the former constituency of Meon Valley

== History ==
The constituency is formed from parts of the former Fareham and Meon Valley constituencies. On 5 April 2023, Suella Braverman (MP for Fareham) defeated Flick Drummond (previously MP for Meon Valley) by 77 votes to 54, to be preselected by a majority of local party members as the Conservative Party's candidate for the new seat in the 2024 election.

== Members of Parliament ==
Election	Member	Party
2024	Suella Braverman	Conservative
2026	Suella Braverman	Reform UK

== Elections ==
=== Elections in the 2020s ===
2024 general election: Fareham and Waterlooville
Party	Candidate	Votes	%	±%
Conservative	Suella Braverman	17,561	35.0	−26.2
Labour	Gemma Furnivall	11,482	22.9	+7.1
Liberal Democrats	Bella Hewitt	9,533	19.0	+0.1
Reform	Kevan Chippindall-Higgin	9,084	18.1	N/A
Green	Baz Marie	2,036	4.1	±0.0
Hampshire Ind.	Robert Holliday	217	0.4	N/A
Rejoin EU	Edward Dean	210	0.4	N/A
Majority		6,079	12.1	−30.1
Turnout		50,123	64.5	−0.9
Registered electors		77,691		
Conservative hold		Swing	−16.7	

=== Elections in the 2010s ===
2019 notional result
Party	Vote	%
Conservative	30,819	61.2
Liberal Democrats	9,543	18.9
Labour	7,951	15.8
Green	2,065	4.1
Turnout	50,378	65.4
Electorate	77,036	

== See also ==
- List of parliamentary constituencies in Hampshire
- List of parliamentary constituencies in the South East England (region)
