= Winchester City Council elections =

Local government elections in Hampshire, England

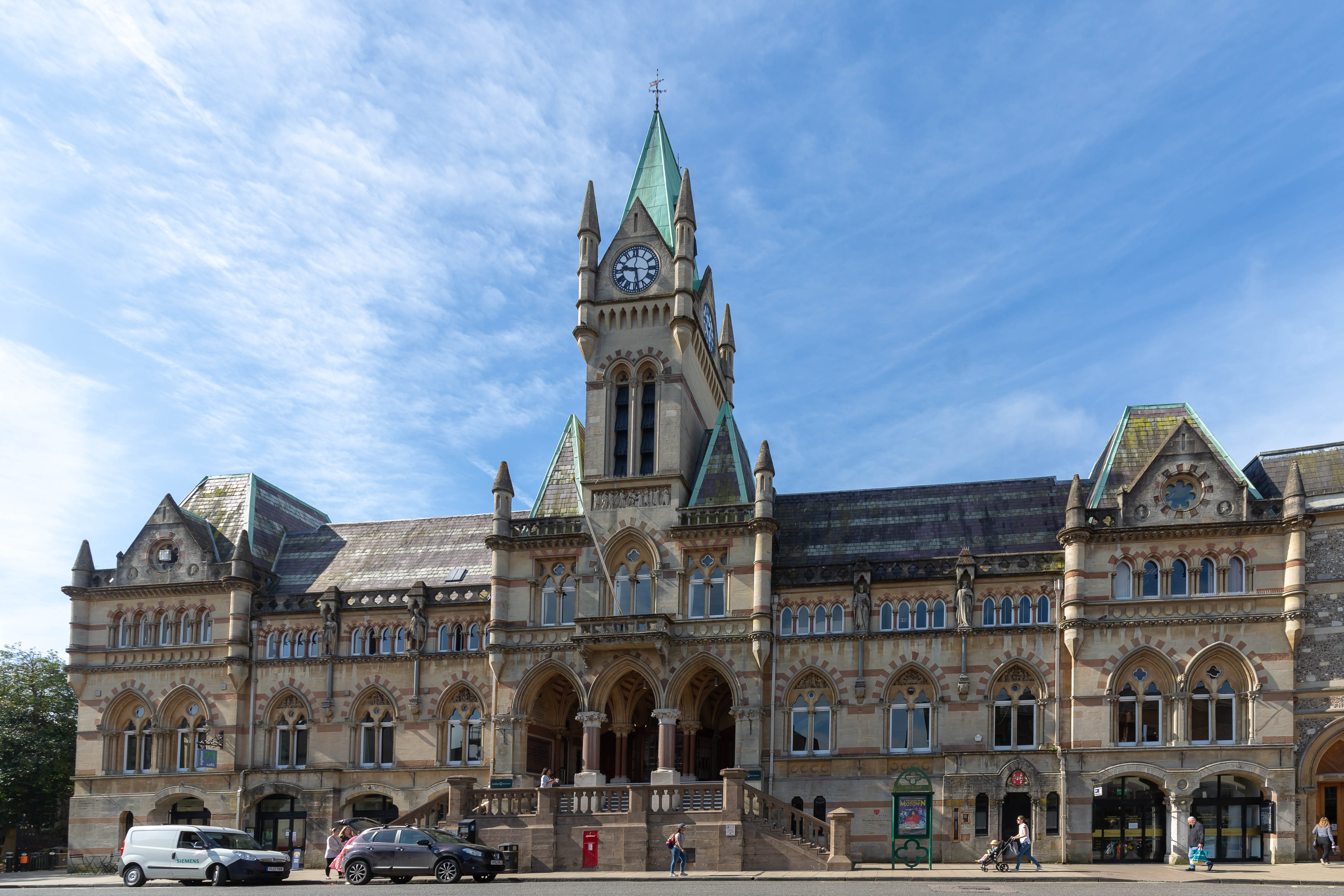
Winchester Guildhall, home of the City Council, seen in 2018

Winchester City Council is responsible for the local government of the City of Winchester in Hampshire, England. Despite its name, the City of Winchester is a local government district that stretches far beyond the urban area of Winchester, covering urban, suburban and rural areas.

One third of Winchester City Council is elected each year in a sequence of three years, followed by one year without election, thus giving a tenure for individual councillors of four years. Since the last boundary changes in 2016, 45 councillors have been elected from 16 wards, there having previously been 57 councillors have been elected from 26 wards from 2002.

== Council composition ==
Composition of the council
Year	Conservative	Liberal Democrats (Note: Includes totals for the predecessors of the Liberal Democrats, the Liberal Party and SDP (both of which participated in the Alliance).)	Labour	Green	Independents & Others	Council control after election
Local government reorganisation; council established (51 seats)
1973	14	5	5	–	27	Independent
New ward boundaries (54 seats)
1976	24	3	4	0	23	No overall control
1979	36	2	4	0	12	Conservative
1980	35	2	5	0	12	Conservative
1982	35	5	5	0	9	Conservative
1983	36	5	5	0	8	Conservative
1984	37	7	5	0	5	Conservative
1986	32	14	5	0	4	Conservative
1987	25	23	5	0	2	No overall control
1988	26	22	5	0	2	No overall control
1990	27	22	6	0	0	No overall control
1991	26	23	6	0	0	No overall control
1992	23	22	6	0	4	No overall control
1994	16	29	6	0	4	Liberal Democrats
1995	12	33	6	0	4	Liberal Democrats
1996	9	36	6	0	4	Liberal Democrats
1998	10	37	4	0	4	Liberal Democrats
1973	12	34	4	0	5	Liberal Democrats
2000	10	36	4	0	5	Liberal Democrats
New ward boundaries (57 seats)
2002	14	35	3	0	5	Liberal Democrats
2003	19	29	5	0	4	Liberal Democrats
2004	22	26	4	0	5	No overall control
2006	29	21	3	0	4	Conservative
2007	29	23	1	0	4	Conservative
2008	29	24	1	0	3	Conservative
2010	26	29	0	0	2	Liberal Democrats
2011	27	27	1	0	2	No overall control
2012	29	25	2	0	1	Conservative
2014	28	25	3	0	1	No overall control
2015	33	22	2	0	0	Conservative
New ward boundaries (45 seats)
2016	25	20	0	0	0	Conservative
2018	23	22	0	0	0	Conservative
2019	18	27	0	0	0	Liberal Democrats
2021	16	27	0	0	2	Liberal Democrats
2022	15	27	0	1	2	Liberal Democrats
2023	12	30	0	2	1	Liberal Democrats
2024	8	33	0	3	1	Liberal Democrats
2026	4	36	0	4	1	Liberal Democrats

== District result maps ==
2002 results map

2003 results map

2004 results map

2006 results map

2007 results map

2008 results map

2010 results map

2011 results map

2012 results map

2014 results map

2015 results map

2016 results map (New Boundaries)

2018 results map

2019 results map

2021 results map

2022 results map

2023 results map

2024 results map

2026 results map

N.b. White denotes no election held in ward that year

== By-election results ==
=== 1998–2002 ===
Shedfield By-Election 17 September 1998
Party	Candidate	Votes	%	±%
Independent	Paul Hoare	314	51.3	−20.3
Conservative	Roger Huxstep	145	23.7	+23.7
Liberal Democrats	Margaret Scriven	140	22.9	+22.9
Labour		13	2.1	−13.5
Majority		169	27.6	
Turnout		612	50.0	
Independent hold		Swing		

Durley and Upham By-Election 7 June 2001
Party	Candidate	Votes	%	±%
Conservative	Malcolm Le May	438	49.0	+13.2
Liberal Democrats	Safia Boot	404	45.2	−13.4
Labour	Timothy Curran	52	5.8	+0.2
Majority		34	3.8	
Turnout		894	77	
Conservative gain from Liberal Democrats		Swing		

=== 2002–2006 ===
Olivers Battery & Badger Farm By-Election 29 September 2005
Party	Candidate	Votes	%	±%
Liberal Democrats	David Spender	853	57.1	−0.8
Conservative	Susan Evershed	584	39.1	+2.0
Labour	Clare McKenna	56	3.7	−1.3
Majority		269	18.0	
Turnout		1,493	46.3	
Liberal Democrats hold		Swing		

=== 2006–2010 ===
Wickham By-Election 22 November 2007
Party	Candidate	Votes	%	±%
Liberal Democrats	Angela Clear	630	60.9	−0.2
Conservative	Karen Jeffreys	349	33.8	−2.8
UKIP	Douglas Reed	40	3.9	+3.9
Labour	Robert Rudge	15	1.5	−0.8
Majority		281	27.1	
Turnout		1,034	33.0	
Liberal Democrats hold		Swing		

Colden Common and Twyford By-Election 25 September 2008
Party	Candidate	Votes	%	±%
Liberal Democrats	Daryl Henry	1,180	54.1	+1.1
Conservative	Sue Evershed	938	43.0	−1.6
Labour	Nicholas Carr	64	2.9	+0.5
Majority		242	11.1	
Turnout		2,182	51.0	
Liberal Democrats hold		Swing		

=== 2010–2014 ===
St Pauls By-Election 14 October 2010
Party	Candidate	Votes	%	±%
Liberal Democrats	Robert Hutchison	968	53.2	−4.7
Conservative	Helen Osborne	606	33.3	−2.2
Labour	Nigel Fox	247	13.6	+7.0
Majority		362	19.9	
Turnout		1,821	32.4	
Liberal Democrats hold		Swing		

Oliver's Battery and Badger Farm By-Election 27 January 2011
Party	Candidate	Votes	%	±%
Liberal Democrats	Brian Laming	894	53.9	−6.3
Conservative	Leanne Wheeler	604	36.4	+1.3
Labour	Hum Qureshi	162	9.8	+5.1
Majority		290	17.5	
Turnout		1,660	51.1	
Liberal Democrats hold		Swing		

=== 2018–2022 ===
Upper Meon Valley By-Election, 20 September 2018
Party	Candidate	Votes	%	±%
Conservative	Hugh Michael Rawson Lumby	1039	51.6	−18.0
Liberal Democrats	Lewis John North	905	44.9	+24.0
Labour	June Elizabeth Kershaw	39	1.9	−7.6
Green	Andrew Karl Wainwright	31	1.5	N/A
Majority		134		
Conservative hold		Swing		

=== 2022–2026 ===
St Michael By-Election 4 July 2024
Party	Candidate	Votes	%	±%
Liberal Democrats	Richard Murphy	2,217	48.3	−5.4
Conservative	Leo Keay	1,193	26.0	−0.4
Green	Richard Needham	795	17.3	+4.2
Labour	Peter Marsh	385	8.4	+1.6
Majority		1,024	22.3	−4.9
Turnout		4,622	70.1	+29.2
Liberal Democrats hold		Swing	-2.9	

Colden Common and Twyford By-Election 1 May 2025
Party	Candidate	Votes	%	±%
Green	Liam Bailey-Morgan	711	40.2	+33.4
Conservative	Harry Johnson-Hill	514	29.1	+1.6
Liberal Democrats	Syed Nasser	503	28.5	−33.3
Labour	Alison Cochrane	39	2.2	−1.7
Majority		197	11.1	
Turnout		1,767		
Green gain from Liberal Democrats		Swing		

== See also ==
- 1976 Winchester City Council election (New ward boundaries)
- 1986 Winchester City Council election (City boundary changes took place but the number of seats remained the same)
- 1998 Winchester City Council election
- 1999 Winchester City Council election
- 2000 Winchester City Council election
- 2002 Winchester City Council election (New ward boundaries increased the number of seats by 2)
- 2003 Winchester City Council election
- 2004 Winchester City Council election
- 2006 Winchester City Council election
- 2007 Winchester City Council election
- 2008 Winchester City Council election
- 2010 Winchester City Council election
- 2011 Winchester City Council election
- 2012 Winchester City Council election
- 2014 Winchester City Council election
- 2015 Winchester City Council election
- 2016 Winchester City Council election (New ward boundaries)
- 2018 Winchester City Council election
- 2019 Winchester City Council election
- 2021 Winchester City Council election
- 2022 Winchester City Council election
- 2023 Winchester City Council election
- 2024 Winchester City Council election
- 2026 Winchester City Council election
