= 2000 Winchester City Council election =

2000 UK local government election

The 2000 Winchester Council election took place on 4 May 2000 to elect members of Winchester District Council in Hampshire, England. One third of the council was up for election and the Liberal Democrats stayed in overall control of the council.

After the election, the composition of the council was:

- Liberal Democrat 36
- Conservative 10
- Independent 5
- Labour 4

== Campaign ==
One third of the seats were being contested, with an extra seat being up for election in St Bartholomew ward after the sitting Conservative councillor, Flick Drummond, emigrated to the US and thus failed to attend any council meetings in the required 6-month period. The Liberal Democrats had a majority of 13 seats before the election and despite defending 9 seats were expected to remain in control of the council. 3 sitting councillors, all Liberal Democrats, stood down at the election, Miranda Bulloch, Phrynette Dickens and Alan Laidlaw.

The Conservatives campaigned on a promise to reduce council tax by 5% over the next 4 years and attacked the Liberal Democrats over the closure of car parks in the city centre. However the Liberal Democrats alleged lies had been said about the car parks, and said the Conservatives would have to cut services if they were to reduce council tax.

The Conservatives also complained about the Liberal Democrat controlled council publishing a newsletter during the campaign. They claimed that it was propaganda for the Liberal Democrats and favoured sitting councillors, however the Liberal Democrats said that the Conservative leader on the council had approved the newsletter and that the Conservatives were avoiding the real issues.

== Election result ==
The results saw the Liberal Democrats increase their control of the council, making 2 nets gains to have an overall majority of 17. They gained seats in Compton and Shawford, St Bartholomew and Wonston wards, but lost one back to the Conservatives in New Alresford. Despite this the Conservatives said that they were pleased to have won more votes across the whole council than the Liberal Democrats, with many seats seeing very close results. Meanwhile, one Labour candidate, Oliver de Peyer, only won 7 votes in Shedfield ward, the lowest by any major party candidate in elections for Winchester council and a repeat of his performance in Sparsholt in 1998. Overall turnout in the election was 39.97%, with the highest turnout being recorded in Droxford, Soberton & Hambledon ward at 57.68%.

Winchester local election result 2000
Party	Seats	Gains	Losses	Net gain/loss	Seats %	Votes %	Votes	+/−
Liberal Democrats	11	3	1	+2	57.9	39.3	9,756	-5.1%
Conservative	3	1	3	-2	15.8	42.5	10,554	+3.0%
Independent	3	0	0	0	15.8	6.8	1,678	+2.9%
Labour	2	0	0	0	10.5	11.4	2,818	-0.7%

== Ward results ==
Badger Farm
Party	Candidate	Votes	%	±%
Liberal Democrats	Geraldine McKay	410	58.2	
Conservative	Peter Welburn	237	33.7	
Labour	Shelagh Bird	57	8.1	
Majority		173	24.5	
Turnout		704	36.0	
Liberal Democrats hold		Swing		

Bishop's Waltham
Party	Candidate	Votes	%	±%
Independent	Georgina Busher	1,013	63.5	+14.9
Conservative	Alan Foster	469	29.4	+7.6
Labour	Michael Chaplin	114	7.1	+2.7
Majority		544	34.1	+10.7
Turnout		1,596	31.9	−6.8
Independent hold		Swing		

Boarhunt & Southwick
Party	Candidate	Votes	%	±%
Liberal Democrats	Kenneth Carter	263	61.2	
Conservative	Mike Roberts	133	30.9	
Labour	James Ross	34	7.9	
Majority		130	30.3	
Turnout		430	45.7	
Liberal Democrats hold		Swing		

Compton & Shawford
Party	Candidate	Votes	%	±%
Liberal Democrats	Charlotte Bailey	338	50.9	
Conservative	Margaret Campbell-White	311	46.8	
Labour	Kevin Barrett	15	2.3	
Majority		27	4.1	
Turnout		664	55.8	
Liberal Democrats gain from Conservative		Swing		

Denmead
Party	Candidate	Votes	%	±%
Conservative	Donald Stewart	1,167	69.5	+2.8
Liberal Democrats	Alan Slade	450	26.8	+0.1
Labour	Timothy Curran	61	3.6	−3.0
Majority		717	42.7	+2.7
Turnout		1,678	36.0	−2.3
Conservative hold		Swing		

Droxford, Soberton & Hambledon
Party	Candidate	Votes	%	±%
Conservative	Diana Empson	918	64.2	
Liberal Democrats	Margaret Scriven	465	32.5	
Labour	Denis May	48	3.4	
Majority		453	31.7	
Turnout		1,431	57.7	
Conservative hold		Swing		

Littleton
Party	Candidate	Votes	%	±%
Liberal Democrats	George Fothergill	806	59.1	+4.1
Conservative	Barry Lipscomb	516	37.8	−2.9
Labour	Tessa Valentine	42	3.1	−1.2
Majority		290	21.3	+7.0
Turnout		1,364	50.9	+0.9
Liberal Democrats hold		Swing		

New Alresford
Party	Candidate	Votes	%	±%
Conservative	Ernest Jeffs	876	44.4	−2.5
Liberal Democrats	Simon Cook	772	39.1	+4.9
Labour	Robin Atkins	324	16.4	−2.4
Majority		104	5.3	−7.4
Turnout		1,972	47.2	−6.3
Conservative gain from Liberal Democrats		Swing		

Owslebury & Colden Common
Party	Candidate	Votes	%	±%
Liberal Democrats	Cecily Sutton	652	49.2	
Conservative	Peter Facey	589	44.4	
Labour	Pamela Smith	85	6.4	
Majority		63	4.8	
Turnout		1,326	37.5	
Liberal Democrats hold		Swing		

Shedfield
Party	Candidate	Votes	%	±%
Independent	Paul Hoare	325	56.5	
Conservative	Roger Huxstep	181	31.5	
Liberal Democrats	Pauline Longcroft	62	10.8	
Labour	Oliver De Peyer	7	1.2	
Majority		144	25.0	
Turnout		575	47.8	
Independent hold		Swing		

St Barnabas
Party	Candidate	Votes	%	±%
Liberal Democrats	John Higgins	770	51.1	−8.0
Conservative	Michael Whatley	576	38.2	+8.8
Labour	Simon Woolfenden	161	10.7	−0.8
Majority		194	12.9	−16.8
Turnout		1,507	38.0	−0.1
Liberal Democrats hold		Swing		

St Bartholomew
Party	Candidate	Votes	%	±%
Liberal Democrats	James Maynard	840	46.7	−5.8
Conservative	Ian Jones	769	42.8	+5.4
Labour	Stephen Wyeth	188	10.5	+0.4
Majority		71	3.9	−11.2
Turnout		1,797	42.1	−0.4
Liberal Democrats gain from Conservative		Swing		

St John and All Saints
Party	Candidate	Votes	%	±%
Labour	Chris Pines	616	42.7	−0.6
Liberal Democrats	Signe-Maria Higgins	458	31.7	−4.2
Conservative	Sally Goodman	370	25.6	+4.8
Majority		158	11.0	+3.6
Turnout		1,444	30.9	−1.3
Labour hold		Swing		

St Luke
Party	Candidate	Votes	%	±%
Labour	Patrick Davies	595	38.7	+1.8
Conservative	Stanley Trussler	504	32.7	−2.4
Liberal Democrats	Colin Norris	440	28.6	+0.5
Majority		91	6.0	+4.2
Turnout		1,539	34.1	+4.7
Labour hold		Swing		

St Michael
Party	Candidate	Votes	%	±%
Liberal Democrats	John Beveridge	865	48.4	+5.2
Conservative	Elizabeth Osborne	806	45.1	−2.3
Labour	Antony De Peyer	115	6.4	−3.0
Majority		59	3.3	−0.9
Turnout		1,786	45.6	+2.1
Liberal Democrats hold		Swing		

St Paul
Party	Candidate	Votes	%	±%
Liberal Democrats	Raymond Love	864	47.6	−0.7
Conservative	Jacqueline Pitman	823	45.3	+3.0
Labour	Adrian Field	129	7.1	−2.3
Majority		41	2.3	−3.7
Turnout		1,816	41.4	+0.5
Liberal Democrats hold		Swing		

The Worthys
Party	Candidate	Votes	%	±%
Liberal Democrats	Graham Hutton	657	49.5	
Conservative	Barbara Jeffs	571	43.0	
Labour	Elaine Fullaway	99	7.5	
Majority		86	6.5	
Turnout		1,327	37.9	
Liberal Democrats hold		Swing		

Waltham Chase
Party	Candidate	Votes	%	±%
Independent	Andrew Archard	340	50.9	
Conservative	Richard Bates	185	27.7	
Liberal Democrats	Philippa Currie	84	12.6	
Labour	David Jones	59	8.8	
Majority		155	23.2	
Turnout		668	36.6	
Independent hold		Swing		

Wonston
Party	Candidate	Votes	%	±%
Liberal Democrats	Richard Bayley	560	47.4	−5.8
Conservative	Michael Pocock	553	46.8	+8.5
Labour	Alan Drury	69	5.8	−2.8
Majority		7	0.6	−14.3
Turnout		1,182	39.0	+1.6
Liberal Democrats gain from Conservative		Swing		

Preceded by 1999 Winchester Council election	Winchester local elections	Succeeded by 2002 Winchester Council election
