= 1998 Winchester City Council election =

1998 UK local government election

The 1998 Winchester Council election took place on 7 May 1998 to elect members of Winchester District Council in Hampshire, England. One third of the council was up for election and the Liberal Democrats stayed in overall control of the council.

After the election, the composition of the council was

- Liberal Democrat 37
- Conservative 10
- Labour 4
- Independent 4

== Election result ==
Winchester local election result 1998
Party	Seats	Gains	Losses	Net gain/loss	Seats %	Votes %	Votes	+/−
Liberal Democrats	16			+1	84.2			
Conservative	2			+1	10.5			
Independent	1			0	5.3			
Labour	0			-2	0			

Preceded by 1996 Winchester Council election	Winchester local elections	Succeeded by 1999 Winchester Council election
