= South East Hampshire =

- Proposed unitary authority area
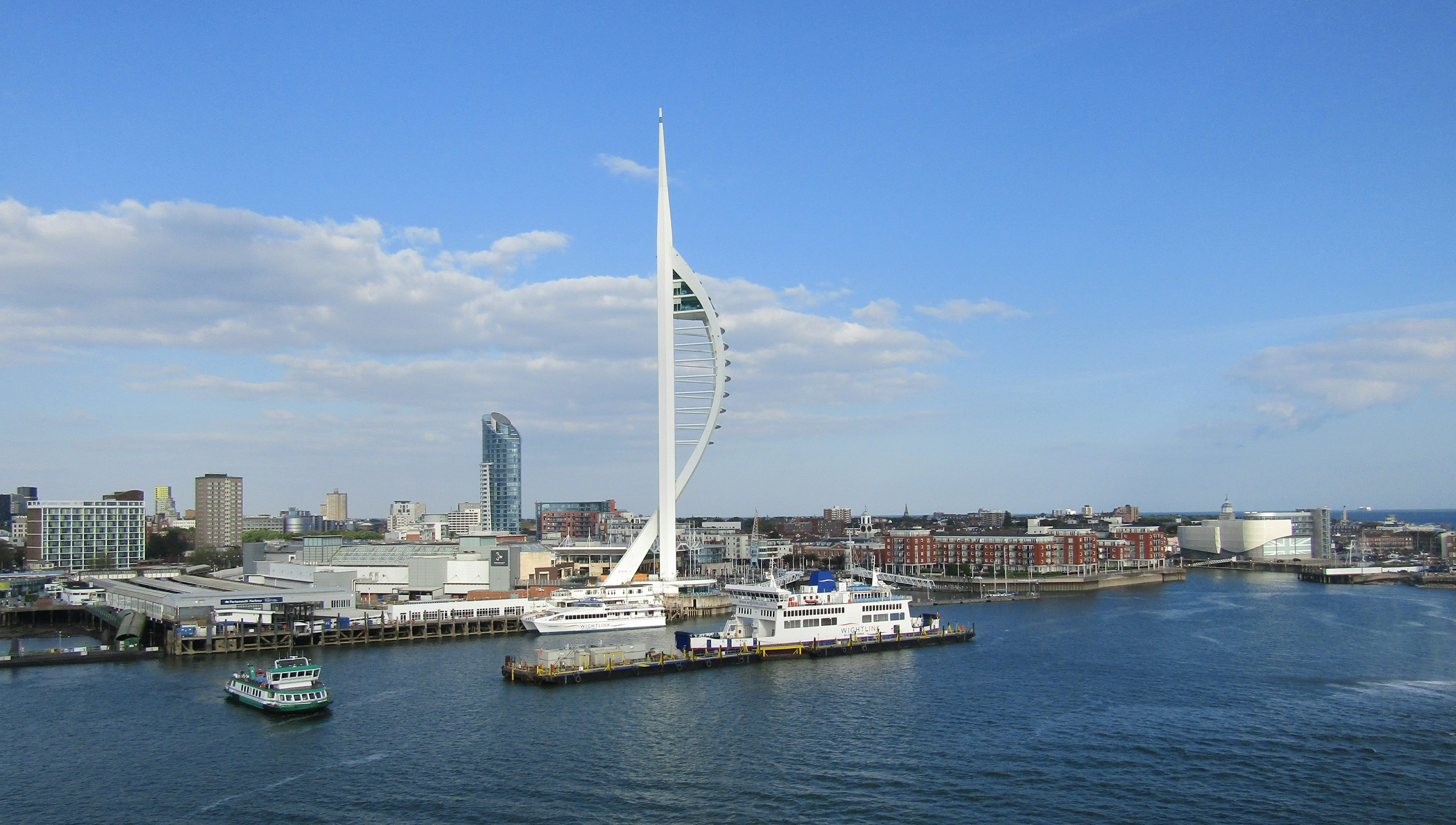
- Spinnaker Tower in Portsmouth

- Interactive map
- Coordinates: 50.81°N 1.08°W
- Sovereign state: United Kingdom
- Country: England
- Region: South East
- Ceremonial county: Hampshire

Government
  - Type: Unitary authority
  - Body: South East Hampshire Council

Population (2024 estimate)
  - Total: 566,246
- Time zone: UTC+0 (GMT)
  - Summer (DST): UTC+1 (BST)

South East Hampshire was a proposed unitary authority in Hampshire, England. It was scheduled to be created in 2027 as part of ongoing local government reform. It would have been formed by a merger of the existing unitary authority of Portsmouth with the two-tier districts of Fareham, Havant, Gosport, as well as parts of the East Hampshire and Winchester districts. The first councillors would have been elected in May 2027, and the new authority would have assumed full powers in April 2028. Plans to create it were withdrawn in September 2026.

== History ==
It was being formed as part of ongoing local government changes throughout England, in which all areas of the country that have separate county councils and district councils will see those replaced with single-tier, or unitary, local governance.

In September 2026, the Hampshire proposals were withdrawn by the government in light of new government advice. The decision was threatened with judicial review by Hampshire County Council.

== Parishes ==
Portsmouth, Havant, Gosport, and Fareham are unparished areas. Parishes in Emsworth and Hayling Island, both in Havant, will be established in 2027. The parish of Newlands would come from the Winchester district, and the parishes of Clanfield, Horndean and Rowlands Castle would come from East Hampshire.
