= 2003 Winchester City Council election =

English local election

← 2002	1 May 2003	2004 →

20 of 57 seats to Winchester City Council 29 seats needed for a majority
	First party	Second party
Party	Conservative	Liberal Democrats
Seats before	14	35
Seats won	10	6
Seats after	19	29
Seat change	▲4	▼6
Popular vote	12,158	11,171
Percentage	45.0%	41.3%
	Third party	Fourth party
Party	Labour	Independent
Seats before	5	3
Seats won	2	1
Seats after	5	4
Seat change	▲2	Steady
Popular vote	2,570	1,117
Percentage	9.5%	4.1%
- Results by Ward
Council control before election
Liberal Democrats
Council control after election
Liberal Democrats

The 2003 Winchester Council election took place on 1 May 2003 to elect members of Winchester District Council in Hampshire, England. One third of the council was up for election and the Liberal Democrats stayed in overall control of the council.

== Background ==
20 were contested in the election with the election in Droxford, Soberton and Hambledon being a by-election after the previous Conservative councillor resigned. 2 other seats saw the sitting councillor standing down, Owslebury and Curdridge and St Luke, while 3 of the Liberal Democrat cabinet members were defending seats.

== Election result ==
The election saw the Liberal Democrats just keep a majority on the council with 29 of the 57 seats. However they lost 4 seats to the Conservatives and 2 to Labour.

Winchester local election result 2003
Party	Seats	Gains	Losses	Net gain/loss	Seats %	Votes %	Votes	+/−
Conservative	11	4	0	+4	55.0	45.8	12,772	+9.2
Liberal Democrats	6	0	6	-6	30.0	41.0	11,437	-3.6
Labour	2	2	0	+2	10.0	9.3	2,586	+0.1
Independent	1	0	0	0	5.0	4.0	1,117	-5.5

== Ward results ==
=== Bishop's Waltham ===
Bishop's Waltham
Party	Candidate	Votes	%	±%
Independent	Colin Chamberlain	863	51.1	
Conservative	Sally Lees	462	27.3	
Liberal Democrats	Jillian Blackmore	289	17.1	
Labour	Stephen Haines	76	4.5	
Majority		401	23.8	
Turnout		1,690	32.9	−5.2
Independent hold		Swing		

=== Colden Common and Twyford ===
Colden Common and Twyford
Party	Candidate	Votes	%	±%
Liberal Democrats	James Wagner	1,004	63.2	
Conservative	Peter Facey	509	32.0	
Labour	Clare McKenna	76	4.8	
Majority		495	31.2	
Turnout		1,589	38.4	−3.7
Liberal Democrats hold		Swing		

=== Compton and Otterbourne ===
Compton and Otterbourne
Party	Candidate	Votes	%	±%
Conservative	Murray McMillan	773	54.4	
Liberal Democrats	Peter Mason	598	42.1	
Labour	Kathleen Smith	51	3.6	
Majority		175	12.3	
Turnout		1,422	45.2	+0.2
Conservative gain from Liberal Democrats		Swing		

=== Denmead ===
Denmead
Party	Candidate	Votes	%	±%
Conservative	Patricia Stallard	1,244	71.8	
Liberal Democrats	Alan Slade	434	25.0	
Labour	Adrian Field	55	3.2	
Majority		810	46.8	
Turnout		1,733	34.8	−6.2
Conservative hold		Swing		

=== Droxford, Soberton and Hambledon ===
Droxford, Soberton and Hambledon
Party	Candidate	Votes	%	±%
Conservative	Anthony Coates	614	68.5	+5.3
Liberal Democrats	Margaret Scriven	266	29.7	−7.1
Labour	Albert Edwards	16	1.8	+1.8
Majority		348	38.8	+12.4
Turnout		896	57.9	−0.8
Conservative hold		Swing		

=== Itchen Valley ===
Itchen Valley
Party	Candidate	Votes	%	±%
Conservative	Daniel Baxter	463	71.8	−0.1
Liberal Democrats	David Keston	153	23.7	−4.4
Labour	Denise Baker	29	4.5	+4.5
Majority		310	48.1	+4.3
Turnout		645	41.5	−0.4
Conservative hold		Swing		

=== Littleton and Harestock ===
Littleton and Harestock
Party	Candidate	Votes	%	±%
Liberal Democrats	Kelsie Learney	875	67.4	
Conservative	James Duddridge	354	27.3	
Labour	Elaine Fullaway	70	5.4	
Majority		521	40.1	
Turnout		1,299	46.1	+4.4
Liberal Democrats hold		Swing		

=== Owslebury and Curdridge ===
Owslebury and Curdridge
Party	Candidate	Votes	%	±%
Liberal Democrats	Ian Merritt	755	52.8	
Conservative	Clive Mansell	634	44.3	
Labour	Timothy Curran	42	2.9	
Majority		121	8.5	
Turnout		1,431	49.1	−0.6
Liberal Democrats hold		Swing		

=== St Barnabas ===
St. Barnabas
Party	Candidate	Votes	%	±%
Conservative	Eileen Berry	1,163	55.2	
Liberal Democrats	John Higgins	819	38.9	
Labour	Simon Woolfenden	123	5.8	
Majority		344	16.3	
Turnout		2,105	46.2	−0.9
Conservative gain from Liberal Democrats		Swing		

=== St. Bartholomew ===
St. Bartholomew
Party	Candidate	Votes	%	±%
Liberal Democrats	Susan Nelmes	798	49.8	
Conservative	Stephen Brine	627	39.1	
Labour	Denis Archdeacon	178	11.1	
Majority		171	10.7	
Turnout		1,603	34.6	−3.3
Liberal Democrats hold		Swing		

=== St. John and All Saints ===
St. John and All Saints
Party	Candidate	Votes	%	±%
Labour	Antony De Peyer	543	39.0	
Liberal Democrats	Hilary Jones	457	32.9	
Conservative	Michael Lovegrove	391	28.1	
Majority		86	6.1	
Turnout		1,391	29.5	−2.3
Labour gain from Liberal Democrats		Swing		

=== St. Luke ===
St. Luke
Party	Candidate	Votes	%	±%
Labour	Peter Rees	438	32.9	
Liberal Democrats	Jacey Jackson	333	25.0	
Conservative	Richard Worrall	305	22.9	
Independent	Heather House	254	19.1	
Majority		105	7.9	
Turnout		1,330	31.2	−12.4
Labour gain from Liberal Democrats		Swing		

=== St. Michael ===
St. Michael
Party	Candidate	Votes	%	±%
Conservative	Fiona Mather	884	50.8	
Liberal Democrats	Susan Chesters	736	42.3	
Labour	Debra Grech	121	7.0	
Majority		148	8.5	
Turnout		1,741	39.3	−4.7
Conservative hold		Swing		

=== St. Paul ===
St. Paul
Party	Candidate	Votes	%	±%
Liberal Democrats	Richard Bennetts	772	62.3	
Conservative	Ian Jones	341	27.5	
Labour	Carol Orchard	126	10.2	
Majority		431	34.8	
Turnout		1,239	27.3	−6.3
Liberal Democrats hold		Swing		

=== Swanmore and Newton ===
Swanmore and Newtown
Party	Candidate	Votes	%	±%
Conservative	Frank Pearson	885	55.3	
Liberal Democrats	Sarah Bradby	670	41.9	
Labour	Denis May	44	2.8	
Majority		215	13.4	
Turnout		1,599	49.9	−2.5
Conservative hold		Swing		

=== The Alresfords ===
The Alresfords
Party	Candidate	Votes	%	±%
Conservative	Ernest Jeffs	1,056	46.1	
Liberal Democrats	Valerie Miller	784	34.3	
Labour	Robin Atkins	449	19.6	
Majority		272	11.8	
Turnout		2,289	46.1	+2.1
Conservative hold		Swing		

=== Upper Meon Valley ===
Upper Meon Valley
Party	Candidate	Votes	%	±%
Conservative	Christine Quar	464	69.3	+1.5
Liberal Democrats	Diana Vear	177	26.4	−5.8
Labour	Tessa Valentine	29	4.3	+4.3
Majority		287	42.9	+7.3
Turnout		670	45.2	−5.6
Conservative hold		Swing		

=== Whiteley ===
Whiteley
Party	Candidate	Votes	%	±%
Conservative	Caroline Watts	297	55.7	
Liberal Democrats	Patrick Wright	213	40.0	
Labour	Michael Chaplin	23	4.3	
Majority		84	15.7	
Turnout		533	29.3	+4.6
Conservative gain from Liberal Democrats		Swing		

=== Wickham ===
Wickham
Party	Candidate	Votes	%	±%
Liberal Democrats	Philip Clohosey	625	58.4	
Conservative	Graeme Quar	416	38.9	
Labour	David Picton-Jones	29	2.7	
Majority		209	19.5	
Turnout		1,070	43.0	−0.1
Liberal Democrats hold		Swing		

=== Wonston and Micheldever ===
Wonston and Micheldever
Party	Candidate	Votes	%	±%
Conservative	Malcolm Wright	890	54.4	
Liberal Democrats	Richard Bayley	679	41.5	
Labour	Nigel Lickley	68	4.2	
Majority		211	12.9	
Turnout		1,637	65.7	+23.8
Conservative gain from Liberal Democrats		Swing		

Preceded by 2002 Winchester Council election	Winchester local elections	Succeeded by 2004 Winchester Council election
