= 2002 Winchester City Council election =

Election in Hampshire, England

- 2 May 2002

All 57 seats to Winchester City Council 29 seats needed for a majority
	First party	Second party
Party	Liberal Democrats	Conservative
Seats won	35	14
Popular vote	36,057	29.600
Percentage	44.6%	36.6%
	Third party	Fourth party
Party	Independent	Labour
Seats won	5	3
Popular vote	7,684	7,459
Percentage	9.5%	9.2%
- Results by Ward
Council control before election
Liberal Democrats
Council control after election
Liberal Democrats

An election was held on 2 May 2002 to elect members of Winchester District Council in Hampshire, England.

The whole council was up for election with boundary changes since the last election in 2000. The boundary changes were the first since the 1970s and they saw the number of seats increased by 2.

The results saw the Liberal Democrats stay in overall control of the council after retaining 35 seats on the council. However the Liberal Democrat leader of the council, Rodney Sabine, lost his seat in New Alresfords ward. The Conservatives increased their number of councillors from 11 to 14, while Labour lost 1 to only hold 3 seats. Voter turnout was higher than nationally, with over 50% voting in 4 wards.

== Election result ==
Winchester local election result 2002
Party	Seats	Gains	Losses	Net gain/loss	Seats %	Votes %	Votes	+/−
Liberal Democrats	35			0	61.4	44.6	36,057	+5.3
Conservative	14			+3	24.6	36.6	29,600	-5.9
Independent	5			0	8.8	9.5	7,684	+2.7
Labour	3			-1	5.3	9.2	7,459	-2.2

== Ward results ==
=== Bishops Waltham ===
Bishops Waltham (3)
Party	Candidate	Votes	%	±%
Independent	Georgina Busher	1,278	55.85	
Independent	Jean Hammerton	1,203		
Independent	Colin Chamberlain	1,166		
Conservative	Sally Lees	442	19.31	
Liberal Democrats	Jillian Blackmore	435	19.01	
Liberal Democrats	Andrew Philpott	361		
Labour	Stephen Haines	133	5.81	
Labour	David Picton-Jones	85		
Turnout		5,103	38.1	
Independent win (new seat)				
Independent win (new seat)				
Independent win (new seat)				

=== Boarhunt & Southwick ===
Boarhunt & Southwick
Party	Candidate	Votes	%	±%
Liberal Democrats	Kenneth Carter	256	52.13	
Conservative	John Cooper	235	47.86	
Majority		21	4.2	
Turnout		491	50.3	
Liberal Democrats win (new seat)				

=== Cheriton & Bishops Sutton ===
Cheriton & Bishops Sutton
Party	Candidate	Votes	%	±%
Conservative	Harry Verney	419	52.50	
Liberal Democrats	Rosalind Sabine	358	44.86	
Labour	Kevin Barrett	21	2.63	
Majority		61	7.64	
Turnout		798	49.0	
Conservative win (new seat)				

=== Colden Common & Twyford ===
Colden Common & Twyford (3)
Party	Candidate	Votes	%	±%
Liberal Democrats	Ian Bidgood	1,119	64.34	
Liberal Democrats	Cecily Sutton	1,020		
Liberal Democrats	James Wagner	1,005		
Conservative	Marcus Moosa	487	28.00	
Conservative	Peter Facey	474		
Conservative	Sheena Nicholson	405		
Labour	David Smith	133	7.64	
Turnout		4,643	42.1	
Liberal Democrats win (new seat)				
Liberal Democrats win (new seat)				
Liberal Democrats win (new seat)				

=== Compton & Otterbourne ===
Compton & Otterbourne (2)
Party	Candidate	Votes	%	±%
Liberal Democrats	Charlotte Bailey	736	52.75	
Liberal Democrats	Peter Mason	647		
Conservative	Margaret Campbell-White	615	44.08	
Conservative	Maurray Macmillan	602		
Labour	Kathleen Smith	44	3.15	
Turnout		2,644	45.0	
Liberal Democrats win (new seat)				
Liberal Democrats win (new seat)				

=== Denmead ===
Denmead (3)
Party	Candidate	Votes	%	±%
Conservative	Frederick Allgood	1,339	63.91	
Conservative	Michael Read	1,170		
Conservative	Patricia Stallard	1,114		
Liberal Democrats	Alan Slade	756	36.08	
Liberal Democrats	Neil Brown	550		
Liberal Democrats	Anne Sabine	532		
Turnout		5,461	41.0	
Conservative win (new seat)				
Conservative win (new seat)				
Conservative win (new seat)				

=== Droxford, Soberton & Hambledon ===
Droxford, Soberton & Hambledon
Party	Candidate	Votes	%	±%
Conservative	Caroline Dinenage	595	63.16	
Liberal Democrats	Margaret Scriven	347	36.83	
Majority		248	26.4	
Turnout		942	58.7	
Conservative win (new seat)				

=== Itchen Valley ===
Itchen Valley
Party	Candidate	Votes	%	±%
Conservative	Daniel Baxter	505	71.93	
Liberal Democrats	David Keston	197	28.06	
Majority		308	43.87	
Turnout		702	41.9	
Conservative win (new seat)				

=== Kings Worthy ===
Kings Worthy (2)
Party	Candidate	Votes	%	±%
Liberal Democrats	Graham Hutton	766	60.17	
Liberal Democrats	Robert Johnston	720		
Conservative	Victoria Hibberd	407	31.97	
Conservative	Barbara Jeffs	406		
Labour	John Craig	100	7.85	
Labour	Elaine Fullaway	85		
Turnout		2,484	41.9	
Liberal Democrats win (new seat)				
Liberal Democrats win (new seat)				

=== Littleton & Harestock ===
Littleton & Harestock (2)
Party	Candidate	Votes	%	±%
Liberal Democrats	George Fothergill	957	71.47	
Liberal Democrats	Kelsie Learney	898		
Conservative	Noelle Brelsford	319	23.82	
Conservative	Ione Ashford	305		
Labour	Malcolm Leatherdale	63	4.70	
Turnout		2,542	41.7	
Liberal Democrats win (new seat)				
Liberal Democrats win (new seat)				

=== Oliver's Battery & Badger Farm ===
Oliver's Battery & Badger Farm (2)
Party	Candidate	Votes	%	±%
Liberal Democrats	Brian Collin	922	67.39	
Liberal Democrats	Geraldine McKay	889		
Conservative	William Halliwell	359	26.24	
Conservative	James Holker	314		
Labour	John Elliot-Smith	87	6.35	
Labour	Pamela Smith	86		
Turnout		2,657	49.7	
Liberal Democrats win (new seat)				
Liberal Democrats win (new seat)				

=== Owslebury & Curdridge ===
Owslebury & Curdridge (2)
Party	Candidate	Votes	%	±%
Liberal Democrats	Richard Knasel	770	55.07	
Liberal Democrats	David Mackenzie	737		
Conservative	Malcolm Le May	565	40.41	
Conservative	Charles Blackmore	523		
Labour	Michael Chaplin	63	4.50	
Labour	Timothy Curran	45		
Turnout		2,703	49.7	
Liberal Democrats win (new seat)				
Liberal Democrats win (new seat)				

=== Shedfield ===
Shedfield (2)
Party	Candidate	Votes	%	±%
Independent	Paul Hoare	850	60.93	
Independent	Ashley Goodall	754		
Conservative	Roger Huxstep	545	39.06	
Conservative	Susan Hughes	392		
Turnout		2,541	43.5	
Independent win (new seat)				
Independent win (new seat)				

=== Sparsholt ===
Sparsholt
Party	Candidate	Votes	%	±%
Liberal Democrats	John Steel	359	51.28	
Conservative	David Parker	341	48.71	
Majority		18	2.57	
Turnout		700	49.7	

=== St Barnabas ===
St Barnabas (3)
Party	Candidate	Votes	%	±%
Liberal Democrats	Allan Mitchell	971	42.42	
Liberal Democrats	Jacqueline Porter	860		
Liberal Democrats	John Higgins	846		
Conservative	Eileen Berry	838	36.60	
Conservative	Anne Saunders	776		
Conservative	Stephen Brine	762		
Independent	Rupert Pitt	307	13.41	
Labour	Tessa Valentine	173	7.55	
Labour	Simon Woolfenden	168		
Labour	Adrian Field	167		
Turnout		5,868	47.1	
Liberal Democrats win (new seat)				
Liberal Democrats win (new seat)				
Liberal Democrats win (new seat)				

=== St Bartholomew ===
St Bartholomew (3)
Party	Candidate	Votes	%	±%
Liberal Democrats	Dominic Hiscock	846	45.77	
Liberal Democrats	James Maynard	814		
Liberal Democrats	Susan Nelmes	805		
Conservative	Christopher Coney	451	24.40	
Conservative	Ian Jones	424		
Conservative	Malcolm Wright	375		
Independent	Philip Butterworth	323	17.47	
Labour	Denis Archdeacon	228	12.33	
Labour	Stephen Wyeth	179		
Labour	Sally James	171		
Turnout		4,616	37.9	
Liberal Democrats win (new seat)				
Liberal Democrats win (new seat)				
Liberal Democrats win (new seat)				

=== St John & All Saints ===
St John & All Saints (3)
Party	Candidate	Votes	%	±%
Labour	Chris Pines	666	38.29	
Labour	Ann Craig	580		
Liberal Democrats	Hillary Jones	534	30.70	
Labour	Antony De Peyer	512		
Liberal Democrats	Andrew Ewing	486		
Conservative	Sally Goodman	280	16.10	
Conservative	James Bone	276		
Conservative	Andrew Beadle	271		
Independent	Henry Cooper	259	14.89	
Turnout		3,864	31.8	
Labour win (new seat)				
Labour win (new seat)				
Liberal Democrats win (new seat)				

=== St Luke ===
St Luke (3)
Party	Candidate	Votes	%	±%
Labour	Patrick Davies	603	41.38	
Liberal Democrats	Ernest Nunn	564	38.70	
Liberal Democrats	David Atwell	556		
Labour	Clare McKenna	519		
Liberal Democrats	Ralph Scott	494		
Labour	Peter Rees	455		
Conservative	Elizabeth Osborne	290	19.90	
Conservative	Stanley Trusser	259		
Conservative	Richard Worrall	248		
Turnout		3,988	43.6	
Labour win (new seat)				
Liberal Democrats win (new seat)				
Liberal Democrats win (new seat)				

=== St Michael ===
St Michael (3)
Party	Candidate	Votes	%	±%
Conservative	Ian Tait	892	38.46	
Liberal Democrats	John Beveridge	759	32.72	
Conservative	Fiona Mather	657		
Conservative	Elizabeth Loader	622		
Liberal Democrats	Richard Coleman	599		
Liberal Democrats	Angela Bamberg	593		
Independent	Keith Story	528	22.76	
Independent	Jocelyn Edmonstone	385		
Labour	Denise Baker	140	6.03	
Labour	Albert Edwards	131		
Labour	Debra Grech	119		
Turnout		5,425	44.0	
Conservative win (new seat)				
Liberal Democrats win (new seat)				
Conservative win (new seat)				

=== St Paul ===
St Paul (3)
Party	Candidate	Votes	%	±%
Liberal Democrats	Raymond Pearce	823	50.67	
Liberal Democrats	Raymond Love	816		
Liberal Democrats	Richard Bennetts	798		
Conservative	Anthony Harding	354	21.79	
Conservative	Simon Storey	351		
Conservative	Michael Lovegrove	343		
Independent	John Murray	243	14.96	
Labour	Nigel Fox	204	12.56	
Labour	Carol Orchard	187		
Labour	Nicholas Burnham	180		
Turnout		4,299	33.6	
Liberal Democrats win (new seat)				
Liberal Democrats win (new seat)				
Liberal Democrats win (new seat)				

=== Swanmore & Newton ===
Swanmore & Newtown (2)
Party	Candidate	Votes	%	±%
Liberal Democrats	Sheila Campbell	814	46.38	
Conservative	Frank Pearson	781	44.50	
Liberal Democrats	Sarah Bradby	723		
Conservative	James Thomson	705		
Independent	Graham Acres	102	5.81	
Labour	Denis May	58	3.30	
Turnout		3,183	52.4	
Liberal Democrats win (new seat)				
Conservative win (new seat)				

=== The Alresfords ===
The Alresfords (3)
Party	Candidate	Votes	%	±%
Conservative	George Hollingbery	1,204	54.3	
Liberal Democrats	Simon Cook	1,013	45.7	
Conservative	Ernest Jeffs	981		
Conservative	Philip Millward	978		
Liberal Democrats	Rodney Sabine	928		
Liberal Democrats	John Thompson	895		
Labour	Robin Atkins	475		
Independent	Sonia Hale	286		
Labour	Reginald Markin	277		
Turnout		7,037	44.0	
Conservative win (new seat)				
Liberal Democrats win (new seat)				
Conservative win (new seat)				

=== Upper Meon Valley ===
Upper Meon Valley
Party	Candidate	Votes	%	±%
Conservative	Christine Quar	511	67.77	
Liberal Democrats	Diana Vear	243	32.22	
Majority		268	35.54	
Turnout		754	50.8	
Conservative win (new seat)				

=== Whiteley ===
Whiteley (2)
Party	Candidate	Votes	%	±%
Liberal Democrats	Brenda Hatch	264	65.34	
Liberal Democrats	Patrick Wright	255		
Conservative	Michael Fraser	140	34.65	
Conservative	Caroline Watts	140		
Turnout		799	24.7	
Liberal Democrats win (new seat)				
Liberal Democrats win (new seat)				

=== Wickham ===
Wickham (2)
Party	Candidate	Votes	%	±%
Liberal Democrats	Therese Evans	632	68.99	
Liberal Democrats	Patrick Clohosey	578		
Conservative	Elizabeth Tyrell	243	26.52	
Conservative	Jocelyn Lovett	237		
Labour	Patricia	41	4.47	
Turnout		1,731	43.1	
Liberal Democrats win (new seat)				
Liberal Democrats win (new seat)				

=== Wonston & Micheldever ===
Wonston & Micheldever (3)
Party	Candidate	Votes	%	±%
Conservative	Kenneth Oxley	832	48.68	
Conservative	Barry Lipscomb	792		
Liberal Democrats	Richard Bayley	758	44.35	
Liberal Democrats	Stuart Newton	744		
Liberal Democrats	Simon Girling	709		
Conservative	Adrian Norman	709		
Labour	Nigel Lickley	119	6.96	
Labour	Alan Drury	94		
Labour	Adam Hug	68		
Turnout		4,825	41.9	
Conservative win (new seat)				
Conservative win (new seat)				
Liberal Democrats win (new seat)				

Preceded by 2000 Winchester Council election	Winchester local elections	Succeeded by 2003 Winchester Council election
