= South Wonston =

Village in Hampshire, England

Coordinates: 51.119984°N 1.336981°W

- Location within Hampshire
- Population: 2,870 (2017 est)
- OS grid reference: SU465355
- District: City of Winchester
- Shire county: Hampshire
- Region: South East
- Country: England
- Sovereign state: United Kingdom
- Post town: Winchester
- Postcode district: SO21
- Dialling code: 01962
- Police: Hampshire and Isle of Wight
- Fire: Hampshire and Isle of Wight
- Ambulance: South Central
- UK Parliament: Winchester

South Wonston is a village on the outskirts of the City of Winchester district of Hampshire, England. The population of the parish of South Wonston was estimated in 2017 to be 2,870.

== Governance ==
South Wonston is part of the Wonston and Micheldever ward which elects three councillors to Winchester City Council, as well as the wider Winchester Downlands ward which elects a single councillor to Hampshire County Council.

== Education ==
South Wonston Primary School is situated in the centre of the village on Downs Road. Attached to the school is the church of St Margaret's, which the school uses for functions. The village does not have its own secondary schools, but the majority of pupils continue onto Henry Beaufort School, in Harestock.

== Medical service ==
There is a surgery located on Downs Road that is run as a branch surgery of the Gratton Surgery, Sutton Scotney.

== Recreation ground ==
The recreation ground is situated to the south east of the village. In the car park of the recreation ground there is a recycling centre for plastics, glass and clothes. There are two football pitches, a tarmac tennis court, a pavilion, a bike track, skate park, a multi-purpose basketball court, the chalk pit (chalkies) and a play park. The car park is accessed from West Hill Road South.

=== South Wonston Swifts FC ===
The local football teams play their home games at the recreation ground. The club has various age groups ranging from U8 to U18 and senior level, playing in local leagues in the Hampshire area.

The Senior team were recently promoted to the Hampshire Premier Division and now play at the highest level the village's team has ever played. The senior team reserves play in the Andover & District division.

== Amenities ==
There is also a village hall, where many local clubs and societies are based. The hall is also available for hire for private functions.

The village does not have a pub, but there is a licensed social club. The club offers functions on most weekends and the usual activities of cribbage, darts and pool. The club can also be used for special functions by arrangement.

There is a village shop and post office in the centre of the village opposite the school.
