= 2026 Winchester City Council election =

Local election in Hampshire, England

- 7 May 2026

15 out of 45 seats to Winchester City Council 23 seats needed for a majority
	First party	Second party
Leader	Martin Tod	Caroline Horrill
Party	Liberal Democrats	Conservative
Last election	33 seats, 47.7%	8 seats, 31.3%
Seats before	32	8
Seats won	13	0
Seats after	36	4
Seat change	▲4	▼4
Popular vote	20,243	10,798
Percentage	41.6%	22.2%
Swing	▼6.1%	▼9.1%
	Third party	Fourth party
Leader	Malcolm Wallace	None
Party	Green	Independent
Last election	3 seats, 14.4%	1 seat, 1.5%
Seats before	4	0
Seats won	1	1
Seats after	4	1
Seat change	Steady	Steady
Popular vote	6,990	1,347
Percentage	14.4%	2.8%
Swing	0.0%	▲1.3%
- Ward Map for 2026 Winchester City Council Elections
Leader before election
Martin Tod
Liberal Democrats
Leader after election
Martin Tod
Liberal Democrats

The 2026 Winchester City Council election was held on 7 May 2026, alongside the other local elections across the United Kingdom being held on the same day, to elect 15 of 32 members of Winchester City Council in Hampshire, England.

Prior to the election, the council was under Liberal Democrat majority control. They won thirteen of the fifteen seats contested at this election, increasing their majority on the council.

== Summary ==
=== Background ===
In 2024, the Liberal Democrats retained control of the council with an increased majority.

=== Council composition ===
After 2024 election		Before 2026 election	
Party	Seats	Party	Seats
Liberal Democrats	33	Liberal Democrats	32
Conservative	8	Conservative	8
Green	3	Green	4
Independent	1	Independent	1

Changes 2024–2026:

- June 2024: George Prest (Liberal Democrats) resigns – by-election held July 2024
- July 2024: Richard Murphy (Liberal Democrats) wins by-election
- March 2025: Hannah Greenberg (Liberal Democrats) resigns – by-election held May 2025
- May 2025: Liam Bailey-Morgan (Green) gains by-election from Liberal Democrats

== Election results ==
The Liberal Democrats, Conservatives, Reform and Labour contested all 15 seats, with the Green Party contesting all seats other than Colden Common and Twyford. The Liberal Democrats won 13 of 15 seats contested, gaining four seats from the Conservatives.The Green Party and Independent Sue Cook retained Central Meon Valley and Colden Common and Twford respectively, and subsequently formed an Independent and Green Group on the Council. With the Conservatives down to four seats, the Independent and Green Group became the principal opposition with five seats between them.

Due to ongoing local government reorganisation, this election was planned to be the final election to Winchester City Council before it is abolished and replaced by Mid Hampshire Council and South East Hampshire Council, two new unitiary authorities, with inaugural elections to be held in 2027.

However, on 7 September 2026, the government announced it was withdrawing plans for the planned restructuring pending review. Following this announcement, local elections due to be held in 2027 under the existing local electoral calendar would proceed.

2026 Winchester City Council election
Party	This election				Full council			This election		
Party	Candidates	Seats	Net	Seats %	Other	Total	Total %	Votes	Votes %	+/−
Liberal Democrats	15	13	▲4	86.7	23	36	80.0	20,243	41.6	–6.1
Conservative	15	0	▼4	0.0	4	4	8.9	10,798	22.2	–9.1
Reform	15	0	Steady	0.0	0	0	0.0	8,407	17.3	N/A
Green	14	1	Steady	6.7	3	4	8.9	6,990	14.4	±0.0
Independent	2	1	Steady	6.7	0	1	2.2	1,347	2.8	+1.3
Labour	15	0	Steady	0.0	0	0	0.0	862	1.8	–3.3

== Incumbents ==
Ward	Incumbent councillor	Party	Re-standing	Result
Alresford & Itchen Valley	Margot Power	Liberal Democrats	Yes	Held seat
Badger Farm & Oliver's Battery	Brian Laming	Liberal Democrats	Yes	Held seat
Bishop's Waltham	Steve Miller	Conservative	Yes	Lib Dem Gain
Central Meon Valley	Malcolm Wallace	Green	Yes	Held seat
Colden Common & Twyford	Susan Cook (Note: Originally elected as a Conservative, but subsequently left the party to sit as an independent.)	Independent	Yes	Held seat
Denmead	Caroline Brook	Conservative	Yes	Lib Dem Gain
Southwick & Wickham	Neil Cutler	Liberal Democrats	Yes	Held seat
St Barnabas	James Batho	Liberal Democrats	Yes	Held seat
St Bartholomew	Kathleen Becker	Liberal Democrats	Yes	Held seat
St Michael	Mark Reach	Liberal Democrats	Yes	Held seat
St Paul	Lucille Thompson	Liberal Democrats	Yes	Held seat
The Worthys	Jackie Porter	Liberal Democrats	Yes	Held seat
Upper Meon Valley	Neil Bolton	Conservative	Yes	Lib Dem Gain
Whiteley & Shedfield	Anne Small	Liberal Democrats	Yes	Held seat
Wonston & Micheldever	Patrick Cunningham	Conservative	Yes	Lib Dem Gain

== Results ==
=== Alresford & Itchen Valley ===
Alresford & Itchen Valley
Party	Candidate	Votes	%	±%
Liberal Democrats	Margot Power*	1,975	52.7	−1.2
Conservative	Lisa Griffiths	901	24.1	−15.0
Reform	Nicholas Hubbard	596	15.9	N/A
Green	Tom Street	228	6.1	+1.6
Labour	Tessa Valentine	45	1.2	−1.2
Majority		1074	28.7	+14
Turnout		3746	53.9	+6.4
Registered electors		6,975		
Liberal Democrats hold		Swing		

=== Badger Farm & Oliver's Battery ===
Badger Farm & Oliver's Battery
Party	Candidate	Votes	%	±%
Liberal Democrats	Brian Laming*	1,735	45.3	+3.9
Conservative	Ed Kennedy	1,192	31.2	−16.3
Reform	Lincoln Redding	442	11.6	N/A
Green	Max Priesemann	387	10.1	+2.7
Labour	Alison Cochrane	75	2	−1.7
Majority		543	14.2	−0.5
Turnout		3826	59.4	11.9
Registered electors		6,475		
Liberal Democrats hold		Swing		

=== Bishops Waltham ===
Bishops Waltham
Party	Candidate	Votes	%	±%
Liberal Democrats	Simone Fleuren	1,493	43.7	−13.7
Conservative	Steve Miller*	856	25.1	+0.2
Reform	Peter Jordan	643	18.8	N/A
Green	Doug Stinton	363	10.6	+4.5
Labour	Steve Haines	59	1.7	−2.7
Majority		637	18.7	−13.8
Turnout		3415	50.4	8.5
Registered electors		6,787		
Liberal Democrats gain from Conservative		Swing		

=== Central Meon Valley ===
Central Meon Valley
Party	Candidate	Votes	%	±%
Green	Malcolm Wallace*	1,570	38.7	−12.8
Conservative	David Newberry	874	21.5	−7.3
Reform	Frances Baxter	858	21.1	N/A
Liberal Democrats	Roger Bentote	708	17.4	0.0
Labour	Martyn Davis	51	1.3	−1.1
Majority		696	17.1	−5.6
Turnout		4061	53.3	+8.9
Registered electors		7,643		
Green hold		Swing		

=== Colden Common & Twyford ===
Colden Common & Twyford
Party	Candidate	Votes	%	±%
Independent	Sue Cook*	1,164	49.1	N/A
Liberal Democrats	Sophia Williams	540	22.8	−39.0
Reform	Kevin Mills	382	16.1	N/A
Conservative	Hugo Mabbott	245	10.3	−17.2
Labour	Adrian Field	42	1.8	−2.1
Majority		624	26.3	+15.2
Turnout		2372	51.2	+12.9
Registered electors		4,659		
Independent gain from Conservative		Swing		

=== Denmead ===
Denmead
Party	Candidate	Votes	%	±%
Liberal Democrats	Martin Clay	1,186	36.4	–7.8
Reform	Amanda Aldridge	998	30.7	N/A
Conservative	Caroline Brook*	800	24.6	–18.7
Green	Laura O'Connor	185	5.7	–0.3
Labour	Andrew Kirby	85	2.6	–3.6
Majority		188	5.7	+4.8
Turnout		3,266	46.9	+13.7
Registered electors		6,963		
Liberal Democrats gain from Conservative				

=== Southwick & Wickham ===
Southwick & Wickham
Party	Candidate	Votes	%	±%
Liberal Democrats	Neil Cutler*	1,056	39.4	–22.5
Reform	Richard Harris	839	31.3	N/A
Conservative	Denise Searle	471	17.6	–5.1
Green	Ben Thomas	257	9.6	+2.3
Labour	Alexander Hodgkinson	58	2.2	–5.8
Majority		217	8.1	–31.1
Turnout		2,691	44.8	+13.9
Registered electors		6,012		
Liberal Democrats hold				

=== St Barnabas ===
St Barnabas
Party	Candidate	Votes	%	±%
Liberal Democrats	James Batho*	1,981	53.2	−0.3
Conservative	David Killeen	746	20.0	−9.2
Green	Jessica Redway	479	12.9	+0.9
Reform	Mark Adams	453	12.2	N/A
Labour	Lucy Sims	66	1.8	−3.6
Majority		1,235	33.2	+8.9
Turnout		3,726	54.8	+9.2
Registered electors		6,823		
Liberal Democrats hold		Swing	▲4.5	

=== St Bartholomew ===
St Bartholomew
Party	Candidate	Votes	%	±%
Liberal Democrats	Kathleen Becker*	1,455	48.1	+2.3
Green	Lorraine Estelle	779	25.8	+1.8
Reform	Roseanna Curley	363	12.0	N/A
Conservative	Fiona Mather	348	11.5	−5.8
Labour	Patrick Davies	79	2.6	−5.7
Majority		676	22.3	−4.1
Turnout		3,025	46.8	+7.9
Registered electors		6,477		
Liberal Democrats hold		Swing	▲0.3	

=== St Michael ===
St Michael
Party	Candidate	Votes	%	±%
Liberal Democrats	Mark Reach*	1,390	42.5	−11.2
Conservative	Ian Tait	760	23.3	+0.7
Green	Kate Needham	636	19.5	+6.4
Reform	David Delmonte	413	12.6	N/A
Labour	Archie Ledger	68	2.1	−4.7
Majority		630	19.3	−11.8
Turnout		3,267	50.2	+8.3
Registered electors		6,526		
Liberal Democrats hold		Swing	▼6.0	

=== St Paul ===
St Paul
Party	Candidate	Votes	%	±%
Liberal Democrats	Lucille Thompson*	1,616	48.3	–1.2
Green	Simon Warde	951	28.4	+2.1
Conservative	Joe Hill	439	13.1	–3.9
Reform	Paul O'Nions	275	8.2	N/A
Labour	Peter Rees	64	1.9	–5.3
Majority		665	19.9	–3.3
Turnout		3,355	52.0	+11.7
Registered electors		6,448		
Liberal Democrats hold		Swing	▼1.7	

=== The Worthys ===
The Worthys
Party	Candidate	Votes	%	±%
Liberal Democrats	Jackie Porter*	1,542	53.2	–2.1
Conservative	Signe Biddle	623	21.5	–12.5
Reform	Liam Horton	431	14.9	N/A
Green	Luke Ainscough	253	8.7	+3.2
Labour	Jamie Trodden	51	1.8	–3.4
Majority		919	31.7	+10.5
Turnout		2,905	50.7	+7.5
Registered electors		5,736		
Liberal Democrats hold		Swing	▲5.2	

=== Upper Meon Valley ===
Upper Meon Valley
Party	Candidate	Votes	%	±%
Liberal Democrats	David Ablitt	933	41.3	0.0
Conservative	Neil Bolton*	917	36.3	−4.6
Reform	Charlotte Northbrook	444	17.6	N/A
Green	Amanda Griffith	208	8.2	−7.4
Labour	Nicholas Bennett-Britton	23	0.9	−1.3
Majority		16	0.6	+0.2
Turnout		2,525	55.3	+5.5
Registered electors		4,578		
Liberal Democrats gain from Conservative		Swing	▲0.1	

=== Whiteley & Shedfield ===
Whiteley & Shedfield
Party	Candidate	Votes	%	±%
Liberal Democrats	Anne Small*	1,301	39.7	–8.5
Reform	Julie Harrison	781	23.8	N/A
Conservative	Marcus Garth	496	15.1	–5.7
Green	Ben Russell	461	14.1	+2.4
Independent	Sean Whelan	183	5.6	–9.6
Labour	Richard Carthew	53	1.6	–2.5
Majority		520	15.9	–11.5
Turnout		3,293	38.9	+4.8
Registered electors		8,464		
Liberal Democrats hold				

=== Wonston & Micheldever ===
Wonston & Micheldever
Party	Candidate	Votes	%	±%
Liberal Democrats	Andrew Adams	1,332	41.3	–1.3
Conservative	Patrick Cunningham*	1,130	35.0	–14.6
Reform	Nick Constable	489	15.2	N/A
Green	Cameron Hardie	233	7.2	+1.7
Labour	Antony de Peyer	43	1.3	–1.0
Majority		202	6.3	N/A
Turnout		3,232	55.7	+6.5
Registered electors		5,800		
Liberal Democrats gain from Conservative		Swing	▲6.7	
