= Beauworth =

Village and parish in Hampshire, England

Coordinates: 51.031092°N 1.179241°W

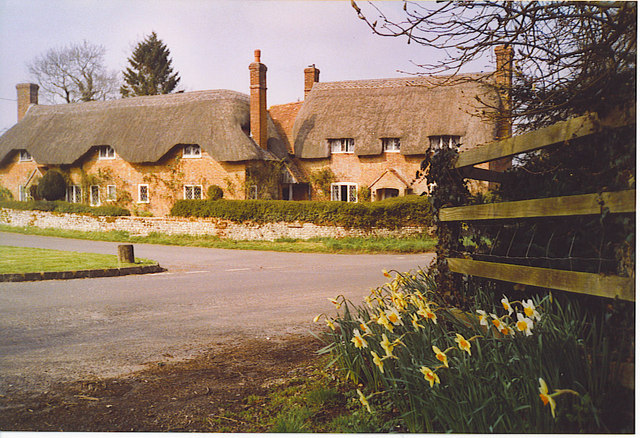
- Thatched cottages in Beauworth

- Location within Hampshire
- Population: 40
- OS grid reference: SU5765226068
- District: City of Winchester
- Shire county: Hampshire
- Region: South East
- Country: England
- Sovereign state: United Kingdom
- Post town: ALRESFORD
- Postcode district: SO24
- Dialling code: 01962 771
- Police: Hampshire and Isle of Wight
- Fire: Hampshire and Isle of Wight
- Ambulance: South Central
- UK Parliament: Winchester

Beauworth (/ˈbjuːwərθ/) is a village and civil parish in the City of Winchester district of Hampshire, England, about eight miles east of Winchester. As of 2013, Beauworth has a small population of 97.

On Sunday afternoon 30 June 1833, four boys playing on a small piece of pasture land discovered what became known as the Beauworth Hoard.The Beauworth Hoard is believed to be linked to the very powerful Walkelin.
