= Newlands, Hampshire =

Coordinates: 50.9050°N 1.0648°W

Newlands
- Civil parish
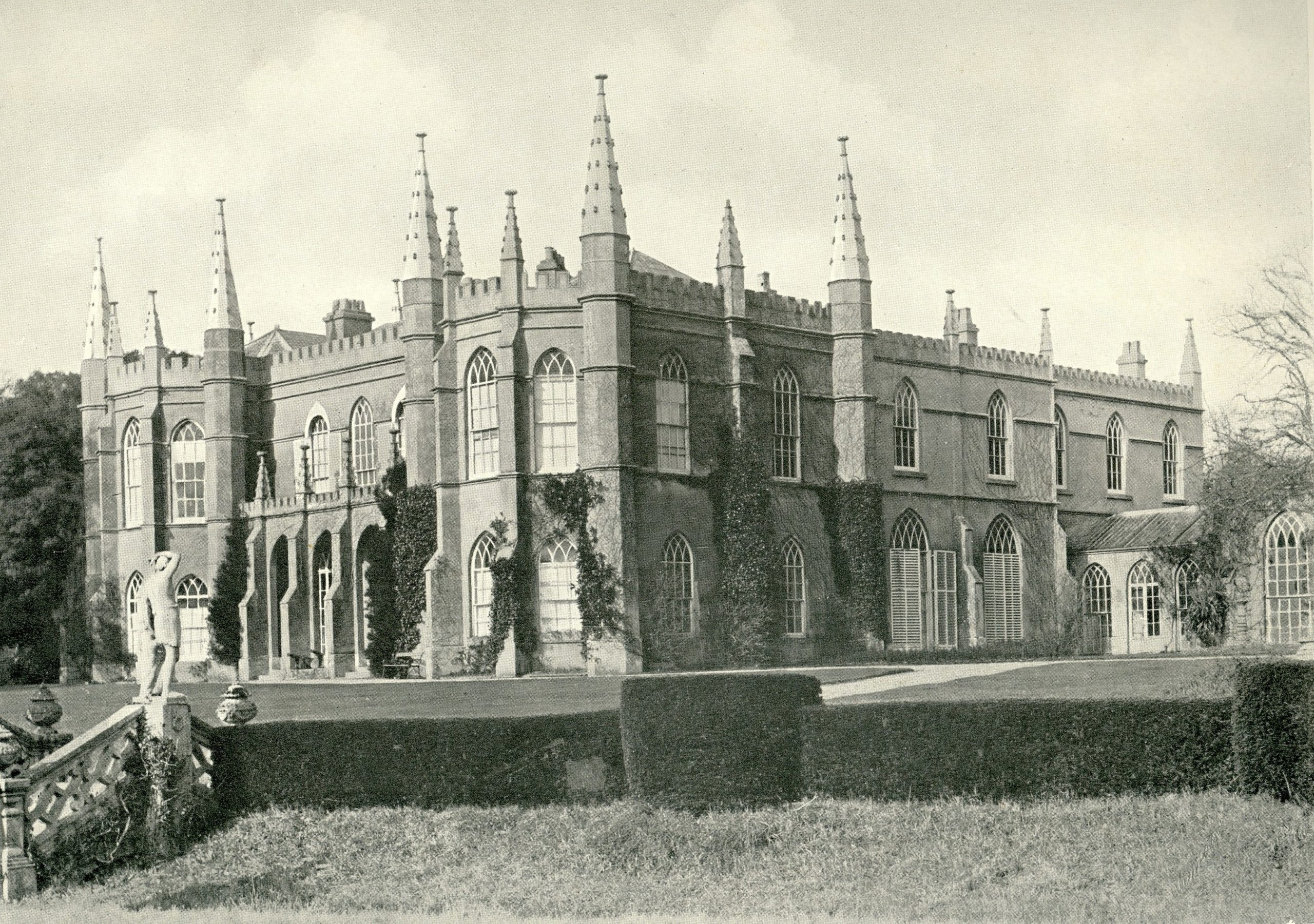

- Location within Hampshire
- District: City of Winchester
- Shire county: Hampshire
- Region: South East
- Country: England
- Sovereign state: United Kingdom
- Postcode district: PO
- Police: Hampshire and Isle of Wight
- Fire: Hampshire and Isle of Wight
- Ambulance: South Central
- UK Parliament: Fareham and Waterlooville

Newlands is a civil parish in Hampshire, England, in the south-east of the local government district of the City of Winchester.

It is composed of the parts of the west of Waterlooville Major Development Area which lie within the City of Winchester district, and straddles the border between the wards of Denmead and of Southwick and Wickham. It was legally created on 1 April 2019, with uncontested elections taking place as part of the 2019 local elections, alongside the Winchester local elections.

The parish is represented by nine parish councillors, including a Chair and Vice-Chair, Chair of the Planning Committee, and Chair of the Finance Committee. As part of Winchester City Council, residents are represented by councillors of Newlands Parish Council, Winchester City Councillors and on Hampshire county council as part of Winchester Southern Parishes Ward.
