= 2022 Winchester City Council election =

2022 UK local government election

- 5 May 2022

15 of 45 seats (One Third) to Winchester City Council 23 seats needed for a majority
	First party	Second party	Third party
Party	Liberal Democrats	Conservative	Green
Seats before	27	16	0
Seats won	9	5	1
Seats after	27	15	1
Seat change	Steady	▼1	▲1

The 2022 Winchester City Council election was held on 5 May 2022. This was on the same day as other local elections across Great Britain.

== Results summary ==
2022 Winchester City Council election
Party	This election				Full council			This election		
Party	Candidates	Seats	Net	Seats %	Other	Total	Total %	Votes	Votes %	+/−
Liberal Democrats	{{{candidates}}}	9	Steady	60.0	18	27	60.0	18,713	45.76	+6.16
Conservative	{{{candidates}}}	5	▼1	33.33	10	15	33.33	15,559	38.05	-7.25
Independent	{{{candidates}}}	0	Steady	0.0	2	2	4.4	269	0.66	N/A
Green	{{{candidates}}}	1	▲1	6.6	0	1	2.2	4,252	10.40	+1.30
Labour	{{{candidates}}}	0	Steady	0.0	0	0	0.0	2,099	5.13	-0.27

== Ward results ==
=== Alresford & Itchen Valley ===
Alresford & Itchen Valley
Party	Candidate	Votes	%	±%
Liberal Democrats	Margot Power	2,304	61.58	+17.01
Conservative	Lorraine Bailey	1,133	30.29	−17.08
Green	Lucinda Graham	249	6.65	+0.09
Labour	Tessa Valentine	55	1.47	−0.03
Majority		1,171	31.29	
Liberal Democrats hold		Swing	+17.04%	

=== Badger Farm & Oliver's Battery ===
Badger Farm & Oliver's Battery
Party	Candidate	Votes	%	±%
Liberal Democrats	Brian Laming	1,789	50.71	+15.65
Conservative	David Kileen	1,451	41.33	−14.50
Green	Max Priesemann	183	5.21	−1.20
Labour	Adrian Field	87	2.48	−0.24
Majority		338	9.38	
Liberal Democrats hold		Swing	+15.07%	

=== Bishops Waltham ===
Bishops Waltham
Party	Candidate	Votes	%	±%
Conservative	Steve Miller	1,248	46.90	−8.33
Liberal Democrats	Jonathan Williams	947	35.59	+10.54
Green	Richard Cannon	299	11.24	+1.72
Labour	Steve Haines	167	6.28	−0.48
Majority		301	11.31	
Conservative hold		Swing	-9.44%	

=== Central Meon Valley ===
Central Meon Valley
Party	Candidate	Votes	%	±%
Green	Malcolm Wallace	1,955	55.49	+22.79
Conservative	Linda Gemmell	1,203	34.14	−13.78
Liberal Democrats	Thomas Gregory	294	8.34	−7.22
Labour	Patricia Harvey	71	2.00	−1.82
Majority		752	21.35	
Green gain from Conservative		Swing	+18.29%	

=== Colden Common & Twyford ===
Colden Common & Twyford
Party	Candidate	Votes	%	±%
Conservative	Sue Cook	1,069	54.32	+12.60
Liberal Democrats	Jonny Morris	718	36.48	−11.86
Labour	Paul Brown	181	9.20	+7.08
Majority		351	17.84	
Conservative hold		Swing	+12.23	

=== Denmead ===
Denmead
Party	Candidate	Votes	%	±%
Conservative	Caroline Brook	1,154	51.84	−13.82
Liberal Democrats	Derrick Murray	709	31.86	+14.92
Green	Jenni Dixon	207	9.30	+1.22
Labour	David Picton-Jones	156	7.01	+3.65
Majority		445	19.99	
Conservative hold		Swing	-14.37%	

=== Southwick & Wickham ===
Southwick & Wickham
Party	Candidate	Votes	%	±%
Liberal Democrats	Neil Cutler	902	47.27	−4.39
Conservative	Sandy Phillips-Lee	538	28.20	−9.53
Independent	George Madgwick	269	14.10	NEW
Green	Julia Stolle	114	5.97	−0.03
Labour	Paul Sony	85	4.45	−0.16
Majority		364	19.08	
Liberal Democrats hold		Swing	+6.96%	

=== St Barnabas ===
St Barnabas
Party	Candidate	Votes	%	±%
Liberal Democrats	James Batho	2,029	54.66	+6.65
Conservative	Andy Lai	1,321	35.59	−6.71
Green	Reece Chadwick	181	4.88	−1.22
Labour	Lucy Sims	181	4.88	+1.30
Majority		708	19.07	
Liberal Democrats hold		Swing	+6.68	

=== St Bartholomew ===
St Bartholomew
Party	Candidate	Votes	%	±%
Liberal Democrats	Kathleen Becker	1,477	56.25	+3.38
Conservative	Sam Feltham	643	24.49	−2.05
Green	Charlotte Harley	254	9.67	−1.05
Labour	Patrick Davies	252	9.60	−1.72
Majority		834	31.76	
Liberal Democrats hold		Swing	+2.72	

=== St Michael ===
St Michael
Party	Candidate	Votes	%	±%
Liberal Democrats	Mark Reach	1,567	51.36	+7.55
Conservative	Fiona Mather	1,000	32.78	−2.55
Green	Kate Needham	274	8.98	−4.62
Labour	Peter Marsh	210	6.89	−2.43
Majority		567	18.58	
Liberal Democrats hold		Swing	+5.05%	

=== St Paul ===
St Paul
Party	Candidate	Votes	%	±%
Liberal Democrats	Lucille Thompson	1,759	62.38	+13.57
Conservative	Leo Keay	583	20.67	−8.77
Green	Giles Gooding	289	10.25	−5.58
Labour	Peter Rees	189	6.70	+0.53
Majority		1176	41.70	
Liberal Democrats hold		Swing	+11.17%	

=== The Worthys ===
The Worthys
Party	Candidate	Votes	%	±%
Liberal Democrats	Jackie Porter	1,428	57.46	+4.81
Conservative	Signe Biddle	925	37.27	−2.02
Labour	Hannah Field	132	5.31	−0.16
Majority		503	20.24	
Liberal Democrats hold		Swing	3.42	

=== Upper Meon Valley ===
Upper Meon Valley
Party	Candidate	Votes	%	±%
Conservative	Neil Bolton	1,128	56.46	−0.90
Liberal Democrats	Yvette Riley	654	32.73	+0.19
Green	Richard Needham	157	7.86	NEW
Labour	Stephen Turner	59	3.00	+0.13
Majority		474	23.72	
Conservative hold		Swing	-0.55%	

=== Whiteley & Shedfield ===
Whiteley & Shedfield
Party	Candidate	Votes	%	±%
Liberal Democrats	Anne Small	1,175	58.02	+7.50
Conservative	Renee Lu	726	35.85	−7.24
Labour	Daniel Reid	124	6.12	−0.27
Majority		449	22.17	
Liberal Democrats hold		Swing	+7.37%	

=== Wonston & Micheldever ===
Wonston & Micheldever
Party	Candidate	Votes	%	±%
Conservative	Patrick Cunningham	1,437	52.46	−9.93
Liberal Democrats	Andrew Adams	970	35.41	+4.15
Green	Robert Parker	182	6.64	NEW
Labour	Samuel Jordan	150	5.47	+1.54
Majority		467	17.05	
Conservative hold		Swing	-4.08%	
