= 2024 Winchester City Council election =

Local election in Hampshire, England

← 2023	2 May 2024	2026 →

14 out of 45 seats to Winchester City Council 23 seats needed for a majority
- Turnout: 41.4%

	First party	Second party
Leader	Martin Tod	Caroline Horrill
Party	Liberal Democrats	Conservative
Leader since	2022	2017
Last election	30 seats, 50.1%	12 seats, 32.2%
Seats before	30	12
Seats won	11	2
Seats after	33	8
Seat change	▲3	▼4
Popular vote	17,258	11,301
Percentage	47.7%	31.3%
Swing	▼2.3%	▼0.9%
	Third party	Fourth party
Leader	Malcolm Wallace	N/A
Party	Green	Independent
Leader since	2023
Last election	2 seats, 12.7%	1 seat, 0.0%
Seats before	2	1
Seats won	1	0
Seats after	3	1
Seat change	▲1	Steady
Popular vote	5,198	552
Percentage	14.4%	1.5%
Swing	▲1.7%	▲1.5%
- Ward map of Winchester, 2024
Leader before election
Martin Tod
Liberal Democrats
Leader after election
Martin Tod
Liberal Democrats

The 2024 Winchester City Council election took place on 2 May 2024 to elect members of Winchester City Council in Hampshire, England. This was on the same day as other local elections across England, and Hampshire's and the Isle of Wight's Constabulary Police and Crime Commissioner election.

There were 14 of the 45 seats on the council up for election, being the usual approximate third of the council. Not all wards had a seat open for election: the two wards Upper Meon Valley and Colden Common & Twyford will next be contested in 2026. The council was already under Liberal Democrat majority control; their majority increased at this election.

== Summary ==
=== Election result ===
2024 Winchester City Council election
Party	This election			Full council			This election		
Party	Seats	Net	Seats %	Other	Total	Total %	Votes	Votes %	+/−
Liberal Democrats	11	▲4	78.6	22	33	73.3	17,258	47.7	-2.3
Conservative	2	▼5	14.3	6	8	17.8	11,301	31.3	-0.9
Green	1	▲1	7.1	2	3	6.7	5,198	14.4	+1.7
Independent	0	Steady	0.0	1	1	2.2	552	1.5	+1.5
Labour	0	Steady	0.0	0	0	0.0	1,853	5.1	+0.2

== Ward results ==
The Statements of Persons Nominated was released by Winchester City Council on 8 April 2024 following the close of nominations. Sitting councillors standing for re-election are marked with an asterisk (*).

=== Alresford & Itchen Valley ===
Alresford & Itchen Valley
Party	Candidate	Votes	%	±%
Liberal Democrats	Clare Pinniger	1,768	53.9	−4.9
Conservative	Fiona Isaacs*	1283	39.1	+4.8
Green	Dane Westley	148	4.5	−0.2
Labour	Tessa Valentine	79	2.4	+0.3
Majority		485	14.7	
Turnout		3297	47.5	
Liberal Democrats gain from Conservative		Swing		

=== Badger Farm and Oliver`s Battery ===
Badger Farm and Oliver`s Battery
Party	Candidate	Votes	%	±%
Conservative	Jan Warwick*	1,618	47.5	+8.8
Liberal Democrats	Anne Forder	1408	41.4	−9.3
Green	Max Priesemann	250	7.4	+1.9
Labour	Adrian Field	125	3.7	+0.9
Majority		210	6.2	
Turnout		3413	54.0	
Conservative hold		Swing		

=== Bishops Waltham ===
Bishops Waltham
Party	Candidate	Votes	%	±%
Liberal Democrats	Ritchie Latham	1,617	57.4	+3.2
Conservative	Henry Laferla	700	24.9	−9.3
Independent	Alex Coles	202	7.2	N/A
Green	Richard Cannon	172	6.1	−1.7
Labour	Steve Haines	125	4.4	+0.6
Majority		917	32.5	
Turnout		2816	41.9	
Liberal Democrats gain from Conservative		Swing		

=== Central Meon Valley ===
Central Meon Valley
Party	Candidate	Votes	%	±%
Green	Suzanne White	1,717	51.5	−11.6
Conservative	Linda Gemmell	960	28.8	+2.9
Liberal Democrats	Eric Bodger	579	17.4	+8.3
Labour	Oliver Hirsch	80	2.4	+0.5
Majority		757	22.7	
Turnout		3336	44.4	
Green gain from Conservative		Swing		

=== Denmead ===
Denmead
Party	Candidate	Votes	%	±%
Liberal Democrats	Michael Bennett	1,006	44.2	+2.8
Conservative	Mike Read*	986	43.3	−1.6
Labour	Andrew Kirby	147	6.5	±0.0
Green	Elizabeth Riley	136	6.0	−1.3
Majority		20	0.9	
Turnout		2275	33.2	
Liberal Democrats gain from Conservative		Swing	25.0	

=== Southwick & Wickham ===
Southwick and Wickham
Party	Candidate	Votes	%	±%
Liberal Democrats	Angela Clear*	1,053	61.9	+6.5
Conservative	Denise Searle	387	22.7	−8.4
Labour	Paul Sony	137	8.0	+3.8
Green	Beata Parry	125	7.3	−2.0
Majority		666	39.2	
Turnout		1702	30.9	
Liberal Democrats hold		Swing		

=== St Barnabas ===
St Barnabas
Party	Candidate	Votes	%	±%
Liberal Democrats	Kelsie Learney*	1,632	53.5	−5.2
Conservative	Antonia Cox	891	29.2	+2.3
Green	Charlotte Harley	365	12.0	+3.4
Labour	Lucy Sims	164	5.4	−0.4
Majority		741	24.3	
Turnout		3052	45.6	
Liberal Democrats hold		Swing		

=== St Bartholomew ===
St Bartholomew
Party	Candidate	Votes	%	±%
Liberal Democrats	John Tippett-Cooper*	1,237	50.4	−6.2
Green	Lorraine Estelle	589	24.0	+12.1
Conservative	Philip Hutchinson	426	17.3	−4.0
Labour	Patrick Davies	204	8.3	−2.0
Majority		648	26.4	
Turnout		2456	38.9	
Liberal Democrats hold		Swing		

=== St Luke ===
St Luke
Party	Candidate	Votes	%	±%
Liberal Democrats	Jamie Scott*	618	57.8	+2.5
Conservative	Ian Tait	212	19.8	−6.3
Labour	Alison Cochrane	142	13.3	−0.2
Green	Michael Perrott	97	9.1	+4.0
Majority		406	38.0	
Turnout		1069	28.5	
Liberal Democrats gain from Conservative		Swing		

=== St Michael ===
St Michael
Party	Candidate	Votes	%	±%
Liberal Democrats	Rachel Aron	1,416	53.7	−1.8
Conservative	Leo Keay	697	22.6	−6.2
Green	Richard Needham	347	13.1	+3.7
Labour	Peter Marsh	179	6.8	+0.5
Majority		719	31.1	
Turnout		2639	41.9	
Liberal Democrats hold		Swing		

=== St Paul ===
St Paul
Party	Candidate	Votes	%	±%
Liberal Democrats	Chris Westwood*	1,315	49.5	−9.0
Green	Giles Gooding	699	26.3	+12.6
Conservative	Steve Russell	453	17.0	−2.4
Labour	Stephen Turner	191	7.2	−1.2
Majority		616	23.2	
Turnout		2658	40.3	
Liberal Democrats hold		Swing		

=== The Worthys ===
The Worthys
Party	Candidate	Votes	%	±%
Liberal Democrats	Steve Cramoysan*	1,275	55.3	−3.3
Conservative	Signe Biddle	785	34.0	+3.1
Green	Andrew Pogson	127	5.5	+1.1
Labour	Cameron Hodgkinson	120	5.2	−0.9
Majority		490	21.2	
Turnout		2307	43.2	
Liberal Democrats hold		Swing		

=== Whiteley & Shedfield ===
Whiteley and Shedfield
Party	Candidate	Votes	%	±%
Liberal Democrats	Vivian Achwal*	1,112	48.2	−15.9
Conservative	Marcus Garth	480	20.8	−5.9
Independent	Sean Whelan	350	15.2	N/A
Green	Kate Needham	269	11.7	+6.9
Labour	Rosalind O`Shaughnessy	94	4.1	−0.3
Majority		632	27.4	
Turnout		2305	34.1	
Liberal Democrats hold		Swing		

=== Wonston & Micheldever ===
Wonston & Micheldever
Party	Candidate	Votes	%	±%
Conservative	Stephen Godfrey*	1,423	49.6	−2.8
Liberal Democrats	Richard Murphy	1222	42.6	+4.3
Green	Dee Wright	157	5.5	−1.0
Labour	Antony de Peyer	66	2.3	−0.6
Majority		201	7.0	
Turnout		2868	49.2	
Conservative hold		Swing		

== Changes 2024–2026 ==
St Michael by-election, 4 July 2024
Party	Candidate	Votes	%	±%
Liberal Democrats	Richard Murphy	2,217	48.3	−5.4
Conservative	Leo Keay	1,193	26.0	+3.4
Green	Richard Needham	795	17.3	+4.2
Labour	Peter Ronald Marsh	385	8.4	+1.6
Majority		1,024	22.3	
Turnout		4,622	70.12	
Registered electors		6,592		
Liberal Democrats hold		Swing		

By-election triggered by resignation of Liberal Democrat councillor George Prest.

Colden Common & Twyford by-election, 2 May 2025
Party	Candidate	Votes	%	±%
Green	Liam Bailey-Morgan	711	40.2	+33.4
Conservative	Harry Johnson-Hill	514	29.1	+1.6
Liberal Democrats	Syed Nasser	503	28.5	−33.3
Labour	Alison Cochrane	39	2.2	−1.7
Majority		197	11.1	
Turnout		1,782	38.32	
Registered electors		4,650		
Green gain from Liberal Democrats		Swing		
