= 2021 Winchester City Council election =

2021 UK local government election

- 6 May 2021

15 of the 45 seats to Winchester City Council 23 seats needed for a majority
Party	Liberal Democrats	Conservative	Independent
Last election	27	18	0
Current seats	26	15	3
- Map showing the results of the 2021 Winchester City Council election
Incumbent Council control
Liberal Democrats

Elections to Winchester City Council took place on 6 May 2021 as part of the 2021 United Kingdom local elections. This took place at the same time as the elections for Hampshire County Council and the Hampshire Police and Crime Commissioner.

== Background ==
Whilst an election for the County Council had already been planned, District Council Elections were delayed due to the ongoing COVID-19 pandemic, meaning that they are due to be held at the same time as the Hampshire County Council Elections.

After the previous elections, the Liberal Democrats took control of the council from the Conservative Party, with the Liberal Democrats holding 27 seats of the 23 required for a majority, and the Conservatives holding the remaining 18. The Liberal Democrats had last been in control of the council between 2010 and 2011, with the council under either Conservative administration or no overall control since then.

Subsequent to the 2019 election, two Conservative Councillors left the party and a further was suspended, whilst a Liberal Democrat councillor resigned, leaving a vacancy. As such, prior to the 2021 election, the Liberal Democrats held 26 seats, the Conservatives 15, and three councillors sat as independents.

The Count for these elections took place on Saturday, 8 May 2021, and results were published by the Council.

== Results summary ==
2021 Winchester City Council election
Party	This election				Full council			This election		
Party	Candidates	Seats	Net	Seats %	Other	Total	Total %	Votes	Votes %	+/−
Liberal Democrats	{{{candidates}}}	8	▼1	53.3	19	27	60.0	16,648	39.6	-8.0
Conservative	{{{candidates}}}	7	▲2	46.7	9	16	35.6	19,049	45.3	+5.9
Independent	{{{candidates}}}	0	▼1	0.0	2	2	4.4	88	0.2	N/A
Green	{{{candidates}}}	0	Steady	0.0	0	0	0.0	3,810	9.1	+1.9
Labour	{{{candidates}}}	0	Steady	0.0	0	0	0.0	2,273	5.4	+1.1
Hampshire Independents	{{{candidates}}}	0	Steady	0.0	0	0	0.0	76	0.2	New
Reform	{{{candidates}}}	0	Steady	0.0	0	0	0.0	66	0.2	New
JAC	{{{candidates}}}	0	Steady	0.0	0	0	0.0	56	0.1	-0.1

== Ward results ==
=== Alresford & Itchen Valley ===
Alresford & Itchen Valley
Party	Candidate	Votes	%	±%
Conservative	Fiona Isaacs	1,798	47.37	+7.18
Liberal Democrats	Yvette Riley	1,692	44.57	−1.33
Green	Alex Blower	249	6.56	−5.33
Labour	Tessa Valentine	57	1.50	−0.50
Majority		106	2.80	
Conservative gain from Independent		Swing		

=== Badger Farm & Oliver's Battery ===
Badger Farm & Oliver's Battery
Party	Candidate	Votes	%	±%
Conservative	Jan Warwick	2,021	55.83	+11.60
Liberal Democrats	James Batho	1,269	35.06	−10.20
Green	Max Priesemann	232	6.41	−1.74
Labour	Adrian Field	98	2.71	+0.38
Majority		752	20.77	
Conservative gain from Liberal Democrats		Swing		

=== Bishops Waltham ===
Bishops Waltham
Party	Candidate	Votes	%	±%
Conservative	Michael Kurn	1,504	55.23	+6.21
Liberal Democrats	Jonathan Williams	682	25.05	−9.16
Green	Richard Cannon	353	12.96	+1.14
Labour	Steve Haines	184	6.76	+1.83
Majority		822	30.18	
Conservative hold		Swing		

=== Central Meon Valley ===
Central Meon Valley
Party	Candidate	Votes	%	±%
Conservative	Frank Pearson	1,669	47.92	−7.84
Green	Malcolm Wallace	1,139	32.70	+19.10
Liberal Democrats	Sheila Campbell	542	15.56	−11.14
Labour	June Kershaw	133	3.82	−0.10
Majority		530	15.22	
Conservative hold		Swing		

=== Denmead ===
Denmead
Party	Candidate	Votes	%	±%
Conservative	Mike Read	1,585	65.66	+13.99
Liberal Democrats	Derrick Murray	409	16.94	−18.31
Green	Robert Parker	195	8.08	−0.49
Labour	David Picton-Jones	137	5.68	+1.18
No Description	Alan Weir	88	3.65	N/A
Majority		1,176	48.72	
Conservative hold		Swing		

=== Southwick & Wickham ===
Southwick & Wickham
Party	Candidate	Votes	%	±%
Liberal Democrats	Angela Clear	964	51.66	−10.78
Conservative	David Roberts	704	37.73	+4.15
Green	Hilary Elphick	112	6.00	N/A
Labour	Paul Sony	86	4.61	+0.64
Majority		260	13.93	
Liberal Democrats hold		Swing		

=== St Barnabas ===
St Barnabas
Party	Candidate	Votes	%	±%
Liberal Democrats	Kelsie Learney	1,809	48.01	−10.92
Conservative	Andy Lai	1,594	42.30	+10.66
Green	Lucinda Graham	230	6.10	−0.27
Labour	John-James Entwistle	135	3.58	+0.54
Majority		215	6.31	
Liberal Democrats hold		Swing		

=== St Bartholomew ===
St Bartholomew
Party	Candidate	Votes	%	±%
Liberal Democrats	John Tippett-Cooper	1,490	52.87	−7.86
Conservative	Marcus Wood	748	26.54	+2.50
Green	Charlotte Harley	302	10.72	+4.15
Labour	Patrick Davies	222	7.88	+2.04
JAC	Teresa Skelton	56	1.99	−0.80
Majority		742	26.33	
Liberal Democrats hold		Swing		

=== St Luke ===
St Luke
Party	Candidate	Votes	%	±%
Conservative	Jamie Scott	686	51.19	+15.55
Liberal Democrats	Cameron Johnson	436	32.54	−10.21
Labour	Megan Ball	136	10.15	−3.72
Green	Oliver Bell	82	6.12	−1.60
Majority		250	18.65	
Conservative hold		Swing		

=== St Michael ===
St Michael (2)
Party	Candidate	Votes	%	±%
Liberal Democrats	Chris Edwards	1,405	43.81	−12.96
Liberal Democrats	Charles Radcliffe	1,151	35.89	−20.88
Conservative	Fiona Mather	1,133	35.33	+6.45
Conservative	Nicola Rule	899	28.03	−0.85
Green	Sarah Gooding	436	13.60	+5.11
Independent	Ian Tait	227	7.08	N/A
Labour	Janet Berry	299	9.32	+3.48
Labour	Antony De Peyer	209	6.52	+0.68
Hampshire Independents	Duncan Stone	56	1.75	N/A
Majority		18	0.56	
Liberal Democrats gain from Conservative		Swing		
Liberal Democrats hold		Swing		

=== St Paul ===
St Paul
Party	Candidate	Votes	%	±%
Liberal Democrats	Christopher Westwood	1,473	48.57	−13.27
Conservative	Harry Johnson-Hill	893	29.44	+9.84
Green	Giles Gooding	480	15.83	+4.81
Labour	Zoe Lewis	187	6.17	−1.36
Majority		580	19.13	
Liberal Democrats hold		Swing		

=== The Worthys ===
The Worthys
Party	Candidate	Votes	%	±%
Liberal Democrats	Steve Cramoysan	1,327	52.62	−12.85
Conservative	Signe Biddle	991	39.29	+14.69
Labour	Kimberley Torkington	138	5.47	+2.44
Reform	Dave Brockless	66	2.62	N/A
Majority		336	13.33	
Liberal Democrats hold		Swing		

=== Whiteley & Shedfield ===
Whiteley & Shedfield
Party	Candidate	Votes	%	±%
Liberal Democrats	Vivian Achwal	1,020	50.52	−6.47
Conservative	David Newberry	870	43.09	+3.80
Labour	Daniel Reid	129	6.39	+2.68
Majority		150	7.43	
Liberal Democrats hold		Swing		

=== Wonston & Micheldever ===
Wonston & Micheldever
Party	Candidate	Votes	%	±%
Conservative	Stephen Godfrey	1,954	62.39	+0.39
Liberal Democrats	Andrew Adams	979	31.26	−1.48
Labour	Jude Wilkinson	123	3.93	−1.31
Hampshire Independents	Alan Stone	76	2.43	N/A
Majority		975	31.13	
Conservative hold		Swing		
