= 2023 Winchester City Council election =

2023 English local election

- 4 May 2023

16 out of 45 seats to Winchester City Council 23 seats needed for a majority
- Turnout: 43.6%

	First party	Second party
Leader	Martin Tod	Caroline Horrill
Party	Liberal Democrats	Conservative
Last election	27 seats, 45.8%	15 seats, 38.1%
Seats before	28	13
Seats won	13	2
Seats after	30	12
Seat change	▲2	▼1
Popular vote	20,672	13,290
Percentage	50.1%	32.2%
Swing	▲4.3%	▼5.9%
	Third party	Fourth party
Party	Green	Independent
Last election	1 seat, 10.4%	2 seats, 0.7%
Seats before	1	3
Seats won	1	0
Seats after	2	1
Seat change	▲1	▼2
Popular vote	5,224	0
Percentage	12.7%	0.0%
Swing	▲2.3%	▼0.7%
- Winner of each seat at the 2023 Winchester City Council election
Leader before election
Martin Tod
Liberal Democrats
Leader after election
Martin Tod
Liberal Democrats

The 2023 Winchester City Council election took place on 4 May 2023 to elect members of Winchester City Council in Hampshire, England. This was on the same day as other local elections in England.

The council was under Liberal Democrat majority control prior to the election. They increased their majority on the council at the election.

== Summary ==
=== Election result ===
2023 Winchester City Council election
Party	This election				Full council			This election		
Party	Candidates	Seats	Net	Seats %	Other	Total	Total %	Votes	Votes %	+/−
Liberal Democrats	{{{candidates}}}	13	▲2	81.3	17	30	66.7	20,672	50.1	+4.3
Conservative	{{{candidates}}}	2	▼1	12.5	10	12	26.7	13,290	32.2	–5.9
Green	{{{candidates}}}	1	▲1	6.3	1	2	4.4	5,224	12.7	+2.3
Independent	{{{candidates}}}	0	▼2	0.0	1	1	2.2	N/A	N/A	–0.7
Labour	{{{candidates}}}	0	Steady	0.0	0	0	0.0	2,018	4.9	–0.2
Reform	{{{candidates}}}	0	Steady	0.0	0	0	0.0	84	0.2	N/A

== Ward results ==
The Statement of Persons Nominated, which details the candidates standing in each ward, was released by Winchester City Council following the close of nominations on 5 April 2023. The results for each ward were as follows:

=== Alresford & Itchen Valley ===
Alresford & Itchen Valley
Party	Candidate	Votes	%	±%
Liberal Democrats	Russell Gordon-Smith*	2,034	58.80	−2.78
Conservative	Harry Johnson-Hill	1,187	34.32	+4.03
Green	Richard Needham	164	4.74	−1.91
Labour	Tessa Valentine	74	2.14	+0.67
Majority				
Turnout				
Registered electors				
Liberal Democrats hold		Swing		

=== Badger Farm & Oliver's Battery ===
Badger Farm & Oliver's Battery
Party	Candidate	Votes	%	±%
Liberal Democrats	Adrian Brophy	1,769	50.66	−0.05
Conservative	Michael Killeen	1,350	38.66	−2.67
Green	Max Priesemann	193	5.53	+0.32
Labour	Adrian Field	96	2.75	+0.27
Reform	Lincoln Redding	84	2.41	NEW
Majority				
Turnout				
Registered electors				
Liberal Democrats hold		Swing		

=== Bishops Waltham ===
Bishops Waltham
Party	Candidate	Votes	%	±%
Liberal Democrats	Jonathan Williams	1,618	54.20	+18.61
Conservative	Donald Iro	1,022	34.24	−12.66
Green	Richard Cannon	232	7.77	−3.47
Labour	Steve Haines	113	3.79	−2.49
Majority				
Turnout				
Registered electors				
Liberal Democrats gain from Conservative		Swing		

=== Central Meon Valley ===
Central Meon Valley
Party	Candidate	Votes	%	±%
Green	Danny Lee	2,168	63.10	+7.61
Conservative	Kris Ford	889	25.87	−8.27
Liberal Democrats	Tom Gregory	313	9.11	+0.77
Labour	Antony McNally	66	1.92	−0.08
Majority				
Turnout				
Registered electors				
Green gain from Independent		Swing		

=== Colden Common & Twyford ===
Colden Common & Twyford
Party	Candidate	Votes	%	±%
Liberal Democrats	Hannah Greenberg	1,247	61.82	+25.34
Conservative	Paula Johnston	555	27.52	−26.80
Green	Lucinda Graham	137	6.79	NEW
Labour	Callum Hunter	78	3.87	−5.33
Majority				
Turnout				
Registered electors				
Liberal Democrats hold		Swing		

=== Denmead ===
Denmead
Party	Candidate	Votes	%	±%
Conservative	Paula Langford-Smith	1,035	44.90	−6.94
Liberal Democrats	Michael Bennett	954	41.39	+9.53
Green	Beata Parry	167	7.25	−2.05
Labour	David Picton-Jones	149	6.46	−0.55
Majority				
Turnout				
Registered electors				
Conservative gain from Independent		Swing		

=== Southwick & Wickham ===
Southwick & Wickham
Party	Candidate	Votes	%	±%
Liberal Democrats	Chris Chamberlain	936	55.35	+8.08
Conservative	Sandy Phillips-Lee	526	31.11	+2.91
Green	Nigel Prior	158	9.34	+3.37
Labour	Paul Sony	71	4.20	−0.25
Majority				
Turnout				
Registered electors				
Liberal Democrats hold		Swing		

=== St Barnabas ===
St. Barnabas
Party	Candidate	Votes	%	±%
Liberal Democrats	Jonny Morris	1,933	58.74	+4.08
Conservative	David Crudgington	885	26.89	−8.70
Green	Lorraine Abraham	282	8.57	+3.69
Labour	Lucy Sims	191	5.80	+0.92
Majority				
Turnout				
Registered electors				
Liberal Democrats hold		Swing		

=== St Bartholomew ===
St. Bartholomew
Party	Candidate	Votes	%	±%
Liberal Democrats	Nathan Eve	1,352	56.55	+0.30
Conservative	Samuel Feltham	509	21.29	−3.20
Green	Charlotte Harley	284	11.88	+2.21
Labour	Patrick Davies	246	10.29	+0.69
Majority				
Turnout				
Registered electors				
Liberal Democrats hold		Swing		

=== St Luke ===
St. Luke
Party	Candidate	Votes	%	±%
Liberal Democrats	Charlie Wise	669	55.33	+22.79
Conservative	Ian Tait	316	26.14	−25.05
Labour	Alison Cochrane	163	13.48	+3.33
Green	Reece Chadwick	61	5.05	−1.07
Majority				
Turnout				
Registered electors				
Liberal Democrats hold		Swing		

=== St Michael ===
St. Michael
Party	Candidate	Votes	%	±%
Liberal Democrats	George Prest	1,601	55.49	+4.13
Conservative	Fiona Mather	832	28.84	−3.94
Green	Kate Needham	271	9.39	+0.41
Labour	Peter Marsh	181	6.27	−0.62
Majority				
Turnout				
Registered electors				
Liberal Democrats hold		Swing		

=== St Paul ===
St. Paul
Party	Candidate	Votes	%	±%
Liberal Democrats	Martin Tod*	1,608	58.49	−3.89
Conservative	Leo Keay	533	19.39	−1.28
Green	Giles Gooding	376	13.68	+3.43
Labour	Stephen Turner	232	8.44	+1.74
Majority				
Turnout				
Registered electors				
Liberal Democrats hold		Swing		

=== The Worthys ===
The Worthys
Party	Candidate	Votes	%	±%
Liberal Democrats	Jane Rutter*	1,331	58.61	+1.15
Conservative	Signe Biddle	702	30.91	−6.36
Labour	Hannah Dawson	139	6.12	+0.81
Green	Andrew Pogson	99	4.36	NEW
Majority				
Turnout				
Registered electors				
Liberal Democrats hold		Swing		

=== Upper Meon Valley ===
Upper Meon Valley
Party	Candidate	Votes	%	±%
Liberal Democrats	Jerry Pett	932	41.31	+8.58
Conservative	Astrea Hurlock	922	40.87	−15.59
Green	Polly Perry	352	15.60	+7.74
Labour	Cameron Hodgkinson	50	2.22	−0.78
Majority				
Turnout				
Registered electors				
Liberal Democrats gain from Conservative		Swing		

=== Whiteley & Shedfield ===
Whiteley & Shedfield
Party	Candidate	Votes	%	±%
Liberal Democrats	Sudhakar Achwal	1,286	64.11	+6.09
Conservative	Tom Garth	536	26.72	−9.13
Green	Nicholas John	96	4.79	NEW
Labour	Alison Ridley	88	4.39	−1.73
Majority				
Turnout				
Registered electors				
Liberal Democrats hold		Swing		

=== Wonston & Micheldever ===
Wonston & Micheldever
Party	Candidate	Votes	%	±%
Conservative	Caroline Horrill*	1,491	52.41	−0.05
Liberal Democrats	Andrew Adams	1,089	38.28	+2.87
Green	Julia Stolle	184	6.47	−0.17
Labour	Antony de Peyer	81	2.85	−2.62
Majority				
Turnout				
Registered electors				
Conservative hold		Swing		
