= 2019 Winchester City Council election =

2019 UK local government election

← 2018	2 May 2019	2021 →

16 of the 45 seats to Winchester City Council 23 seats needed for a majority
- Turnout: 45.10%
	First party	Second party
Leader	Lucille Thompson	Caroline Horrill
Party	Liberal Democrats	Conservative
Leader's seat	St Paul	Wonston & Micheldever
Seats before	22	23
Seats won	11	5
Seats after	27	18
Seat change	▲5	▼5
Popular vote	19,198	15,903
Percentage	47.61%	39.44%
- Results by Ward
Council control before election
Conservative
Council control after election
Liberal Democrats

Elections to Winchester City Council took place on Thursday 2 May 2019, alongside other local elections across the country. The Conservatives Party held a narrow majority of one at the last election, with the seats contested in this election being last contested in 2016 election. The Conservatives defended 10 seats, whilst the Liberal Democrats defended 4. Town and parish councils in the city boundary were also up for election.

== Background ==
Prior to the election, the Conservatives had held overall control of Winchester City Council since 2015, with the Liberal Democrats having last controlled the council between 2010 and 2011. No other parties have held seats in Winchester since the 2016 election, in which the boundaries were redrawn. In June 2018, after the previous election, one Conservative councillor left the party to sit as an independent over concerns about redevelopment of the city.

In July, a Liberal Democrat councillor, who had previously defected from the Conservatives, defected back to the Conservatives after disputes about the leadership of the council; subsequently the independent councillor joined the Liberal Democrats. The statement of persons nominated for the 2019 election was revealed 4 April 2019.

== Election results ==
As the council is elected in thirds, one councillor for each of the 16 wards are elected each year for 3 years with no election in the 4th year. All comparisons in wards and swing are to the corresponding 2016 election (when the current boundaries were created), whilst the council as a whole is to the 2018 election. A total of 40,317 votes were cast, with a turnout of 45.10%.

This was the best result for the Liberal Democrats for around fifteen years. Labour's vote also fell, whilst the Greens' rose. The next election was scheduled to take place in May 2020, one year later, but due to the COVID-19 pandemic, were delayed until 2021, where they were scheduled to take place at the same time of those already planned, which in the context of Winchester included the next Hampshire County Council Election.

Winchester City Council election result 2019
Party	This election			Full council			This election		
Party	Seats	Net	Seats %	Other	Total	Total %	Votes	Votes %	+/−
Liberal Democrats	11	▲5	68.8	16	27	60.0	19,198	47.61	▲6.41
Conservative	5	▼5	31.2	13	18	40.0	15,903	39.44	▼7.76
Green	0	Steady	0.0	0	0	0.0	2,896	7.18	▲4.68
Labour	0	Steady	0.0	0	0	0.0	1,719	4.26	▼4.74
JAC	0	Steady	0.0	0	0	0.0	77	0.19	N/A

After the previous election and immediately prior to this election, the composition of the council was:

↓
23	22
Conservative	Liberal Democrats

After the election result, the composition of the council became:

↓
18	27
Conservative	Liberal Democrats

Composition of Wards after 2018 Election (left) and 2019 Election (right)

== Ward results ==
=== Alresford & Itchen Valley ===
Alresford & Itchen Valley
Party	Candidate	Votes	%	±%
Liberal Democrats	Russel Digby Gordon-Smith	1,559	45.90	−3.18
Conservative	Annie Saunders	1,365	40.19	−6.11
Green	Karl Eslie Borges	404	11.89	N/A
Labour	Ian Duncan Wight	68	2.00	−2.62
Majority		194	5.71	
Liberal Democrats gain from Conservative		Swing		

=== Badger Farm & Oliver's Battery ===
Badger Farm & Oliver's Battery
Party	Candidate	Votes	%	±%
Liberal Democrats	Hannah Williams	1,548	45.26	−5.14
Conservative	Janet Anne Warwick*	1,513	44.23	+3.14
Green	Max Priesemann	279	8.15	+3.48
Labour	Neil Adrian Dolby	80	2.33	−1.50
Majority		35	1.03	
Liberal Democrats gain from Conservative		Swing		

=== Bishops Waltham ===
Bishops Waltham
Party	Candidate	Votes	%	±%
Conservative	David Charles Leon McLean*	1,202	49.02	−25.84
Liberal Democrats	Jonathan Williams	839	34.21	N/A
Green	Sarah Felicity Gooding	290	11.82	N/A
Labour	Steve Haines	121	4.93	−20.21
Majority		363	14.81	
Conservative hold		Swing		

=== Central Meon Valley ===
Central Meon Valley
Party	Candidate	Votes	%	±%
Conservative	Vicki Weston*	1,635	55.76	−8.64
Liberal Democrats	Sheila Mary Campbell	783	26.70	+0.66
Green	Mik Norman	399	13.60	N/A
Labour	Christopher Moore Harpum	115	3.92	−5.64
Majority		852	29.06	
Conservative hold		Swing		

=== Colden Common & Twyford ===
Colden Common & Twyford
Party	Candidate	Votes	%	±%
Liberal Democrats	Tony Melvin Bronk	1,023	48.34	+3.52
Conservative	Andy Kam Hung Lai	883	41.72	−7.22
Green	Lucinda Sarah Graham	165	7.79	N/A
Labour	Paul James Brown	45	2.12	−4.12
Majority		140	6.62	
Liberal Democrats hold		Swing		

=== Denmead ===
Denmead
Party	Candidate	Votes	%	±%
Conservative	Judy Clementson	1,067	51.67	−7.61
Liberal Democrats	Judith Godwin	728	35.25	+9.65
Green	Robert Parker	177	8.57	+1.67
Labour	David John Henry Picton-Jones	93	4.50	−3.72
Majority		339	16.42	
Conservative hold		Swing		

=== Southwick & Wickham ===
Southwick & Wickham
Party	Candidate	Votes	%	±%
Liberal Democrats	Therese Evans*	1,069	62.44	+10.44
Conservative	Loraine Constance Rappe	575	33.58	−5.96
Labour	Paul Thomas Sony	68	3.97	−4.50
Majority		494	28.86	
Liberal Democrats hold		Swing		

=== St Barnabas ===
St Barnabas
Party	Candidate	Votes	%	±%
Liberal Democrats	Mike Craske	2,052	58.93	+7.20
Conservative	Elieen Mary Berry*	1,102	31.64	−9.34
Green	Mike Perrot	222	6.37	+3.30
Labour	Adrian John Paul Field	106	3.04	−1.18
Majority		950	27.29	
Liberal Democrats gain from Conservative		Swing		

=== St Bartholomew ===
St Bartholomew
Party	Candidate	Votes	%	±%
Liberal Democrats	Paula Wendy Ferguson	1,672	60.73	+9.32
Conservative	Rose Burns*	662	24.04	−1.90
Green	David John Walker-Nix	181	6.57	+0.06
Labour	Andrew Timothy Adams	161	5.84	−8.37
JAC	Teresa Skelton	77	2.79	N/A
Majority		1,010	36.69	
Liberal Democrats gain from Conservative		Swing		

=== St Luke ===
St Luke
Party	Candidate	Votes	%	±%
Liberal Democrats	Derek Robert Green*	487	42.75	−6.66
Conservative	Ian Donald Tait	406	35.64	+23.50
Labour	Patrick Davies	158	13.87	−6.82
Green	Giles Richard Gooding	88	7.72	+1.35
Majority		81	7.11	
Liberal Democrats hold		Swing		

=== St Michael ===
St Michael
Party	Candidate	Votes	%	±%
Liberal Democrats	Kim Alexander Gottlieb	1,718	56.77	+12.10
Conservative	Guy Julian Claude Ashton*	874	28.88	−9.46
Green	Julia Ellen Hallmann	257	8.49	+3.18
Labour	Gavin Mark Ellis	177	5.84	−5.84
Majority		844	27.89	
Liberal Democrats gain from Conservative		Swing		

=== St Paul ===
St Paul
Party	Candidate	Votes	%	±%
Liberal Democrats	Martin Tod*	1,593	61.84	+7.03
Conservative	David Simons	505	19.60	−7.88
Green	Andrew Karl Wainwright	284	11.02	+6.25
Labour	Karen Barrat	194	7.53	−5.41
Majority		1,088	42.24	
Liberal Democrats hold		Swing		

=== The Worthys ===
The Worthys
Party	Candidate	Votes	%	±%
Liberal Democrats	Jane Rutter*	1,426	65.47	+10.27
Conservative	Signe Biddle	536	24.60	−12.91
Green	Charlotte Elizabeth Harley	150	6.88	N/A
Labour	Tessa Susan Valentine	66	3.03	−4.26
Majority		890	40.87	
Liberal Democrats hold		Swing		

=== Upper Meon Valley ===
Upper Meon Valley
Party	Candidate	Votes	%	±%
Conservative	Hugh Michael Lumby*	1,235	57.36	−12.25
Liberal Democrats	Lewis North	856	39.75	+18.87
Labour	June Elizabeth Kershaw	62	2.87	−6.63
Majority		379	17.61	
Conservative hold		Swing		

=== Whiteley & Shedfield ===
Whiteley & Shedfield
Party	Candidate	Votes	%	±%
Liberal Democrats	Jonathan Andrew Fern	998	56.99	+5.86
Conservative	Roger Charles Huxstep*	688	39.29	−0.61
Labour	Alison Louise Ridley	65	3.71	−1.30
Majority		310	17.70	
Liberal Democrats gain from Conservative		Swing		

=== Wonston & Micheldever ===
Wonston & Micheldever
Party	Candidate	Votes	%	±%
Conservative	Caroline Horrill*	1,655	62.00	−2.33
Liberal Democrats	Ian Gordon	874	32.74	+5.15
Labour	Jude Wilkinson	140	5.24	−2.84
Majority		791	29.26	
Conservative hold		Swing		
