= 1999 Winchester City Council election =

1999 UK local government election

The 1999 Winchester Council election took place on 6 May 1999 to elect members of Winchester District Council in Hampshire, England. One third of the council was up for election and the Liberal Democrats stayed in overall control of the council.

After the election, the composition of the council was

- Liberal Democrat 34
- Conservative 12
- Independent 5
- Labour 4

== Election result ==
The results saw the Liberal Democrats keep a majority on the council but lose 2 seats to the Conservatives.

Winchester local election result 1999
Party	Seats	Gains	Losses	Net gain/loss	Seats %	Votes %	Votes	+/−
Liberal Democrats	10			-3	55.6	44.4	10,661	
Conservative	5			+2	27.8	39.5	9,488	
Labour	2			0	11.1	12.1	2,914	
Independent	1			+1	5.6	3.9	940	

== Ward results ==
Bishop's Waltham
Party	Candidate	Votes	%	±%
Independent	Colin Chamberlain	940	48.6	
Liberal Democrats	Jillian Blackmore	487	25.2	
Conservative	Gideon Lake	422	21.8	
Labour	Gwendoline Hobbis	85	4.4	
Majority		453	23.4	
Turnout		1,934	38.7	

Denmead
Party	Candidate	Votes	%	±%
Conservative	Frederick Allgood	1,190	66.7	
Liberal Democrats	Alan Slade	477	26.7	
Labour	Susan Underwood	117	6.6	
Majority		713	40.0	
Turnout		1,784	38.3	

Durley and Upham
Party	Candidate	Votes	%	±%
Liberal Democrats	Kenneth Merritt	363	58.5	
Conservative	Gloria Tabor	222	35.8	
Labour	Timothy Curran	35	5.6	
Majority		141	22.7	
Turnout		620	53.0	

Itchen Valley
Party	Candidate	Votes	%	±%
Conservative	Daniel Baxter	382	62.0	
Liberal Democrats	Richard Bayley	203	33.0	
Labour	Oliver De Peyer	31	5.0	
Majority		179	29.0	
Turnout		616	47.3	

Littleton
Party	Candidate	Votes	%	±%
Liberal Democrats	Kelsie Learney	752	55.0	
Conservative	Barry Lipscomb	556	40.7	
Labour	Elaine Fullaway	59	4.3	
Majority		196	14.3	
Turnout		1,367	50.0	

New Alresford
Party	Candidate	Votes	%	±%
Conservative	George Hollingberry	1,046	46.9	
Liberal Democrats	Sarah Witchard	763	34.2	
Labour	Robin Atkins	419	18.8	
Majority		283	12.7	
Turnout		2,228	53.5	

Otterbourne and Hursley
Party	Candidate	Votes	%	±%
Liberal Democrats	Peter Mason	470	60.3	
Conservative	Barbara Jeffs	270	34.6	
Labour	Tessa Valentine	40	5.1	
Majority		200	25.7	
Turnout		780	42.7	

St Barnabas
Party	Candidate	Votes	%	±%
Liberal Democrats	Roy Smith	899	59.1	
Conservative	Michael Whatley	448	29.4	
Labour	Gareth Young	175	11.5	
Majority		451	29.7	
Turnout		1,522	38.1	

St Bartholomew
Party	Candidate	Votes	%	±%
Liberal Democrats	Dominic Hiscock	949	52.5	
Conservative	Ian Jones	677	37.4	
Labour	Stephen Wyeth	183	10.1	
Majority		272	15.1	
Turnout		1,809	42.5	

St John and All Saints
Party	Candidate	Votes	%	±%
Labour	Ann Craig	645	43.3	
Liberal Democrats	Michael Andrews	534	35.9	
Conservative	Sally Goodman	309	20.8	
Majority		111	7.4	
Turnout		1,488	32.2	

St Luke
Party	Candidate	Votes	%	±%
Labour	Clare McKenna	498	36.9	
Conservative	Elizabeth Osborne	474	35.1	
Liberal Democrats	Susan Chesters	379	28.1	
Majority		14	1.8	
Turnout		1,351	29.4	

St Michael
Party	Candidate	Votes	%	±%
Conservative	Iain Tait	824	47.4	
Liberal Democrats	John Higgins	751	43.2	
Labour	Antony De Peyer	163	9.4	
Majority		73	4.2	
Turnout		1,738	43.5	

St Paul
Party	Candidate	Votes	%	±%
Liberal Democrats	Elaine Patton	870	48.3	
Conservative	Jacqueline Pitman	761	42.3	
Labour	Adrian Field	170	9.4	
Majority		109	6.0	
Turnout		1,801	40.9	

Swanmore
Party	Candidate	Votes	%	±%
Liberal Democrats	Sheila Campbell	648	54.0	
Conservative	Sheen Nicholson	499	41.6	
Labour	David Picton-Jones	53	4.4	
Majority		149	12.4	
Turnout		1,200	55.8	

Twyford
Party	Candidate	Votes	%	±%
Liberal Democrats	James Wagner	448	77.0	
Conservative	Ernest Jeffs	113	19.4	
Labour	Kevin Barrett	21	3.6	
Majority		335	57.6	
Turnout		582	50.8	

Upper Meon Valley
Party	Candidate	Votes	%	±%
Conservative	Gerald Corden	526	73.7	
Liberal Democrats	Joanne Jackson	150	21.0	
Labour	Pamela Smith	38	5.3	
Majority		376	52.7	
Turnout		714	49.3	

Wickham
Party	Candidate	Votes	%	±%
Liberal Democrats	Therese Evans	927	68.3	
Conservative	James Duddridge	344	25.3	
Labour	Michael Chaplin	87	6.4	
Majority		583	43.0	
Turnout		1,358	42.4	

Wonston
Party	Candidate	Votes	%	±%
Liberal Democrats	Pamela Hills	591	53.2	
Conservative	Andrew Beadle	425	38.3	
Labour	Alan Drury	95	8.6	
Majority		166	14.9	
Turnout		1,111	37.4	
