= City of Winchester =

Coordinates: 51.062°N 1.317°W

Winchester
- City, borough and non-metropolitan district
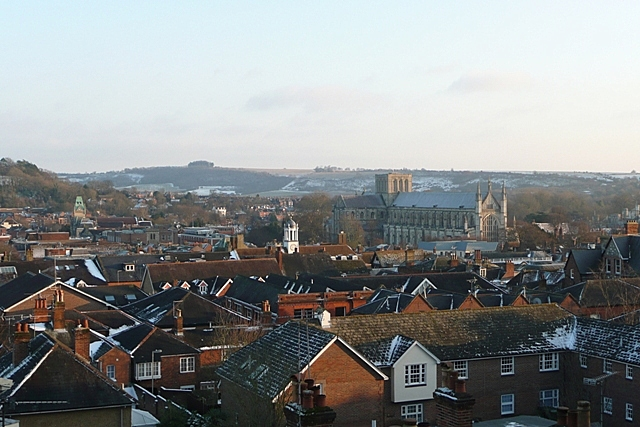
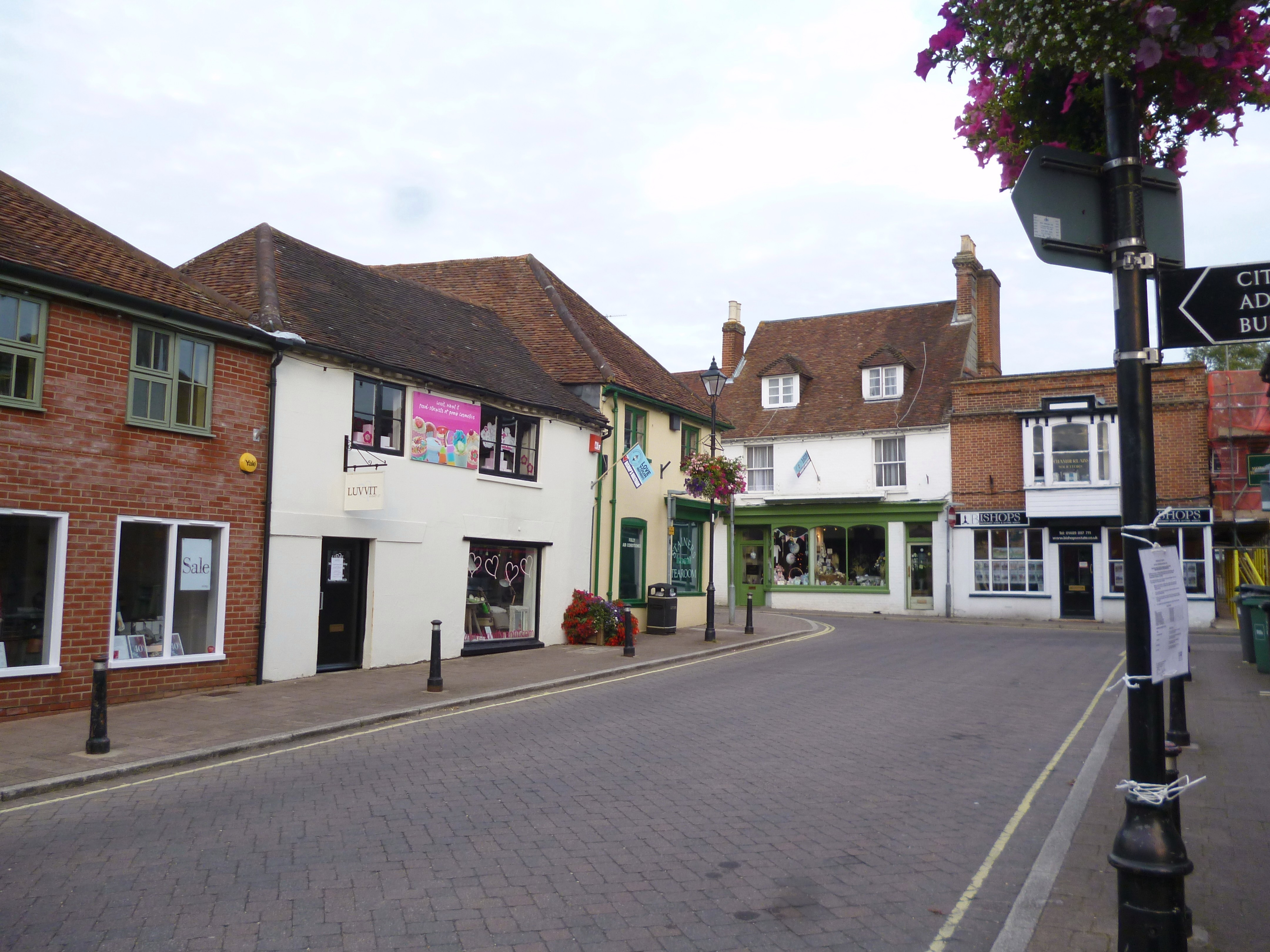
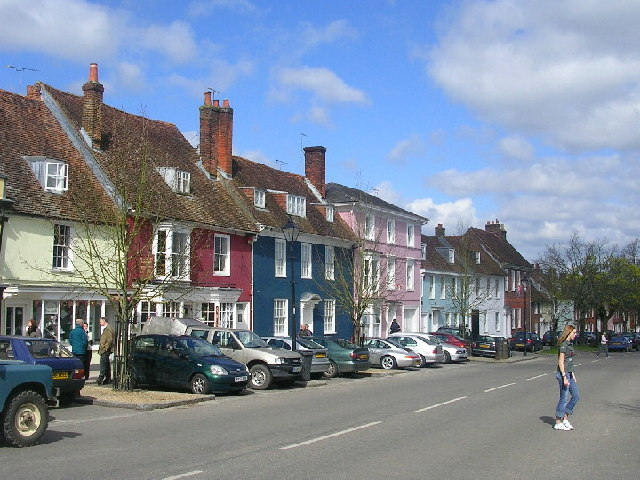
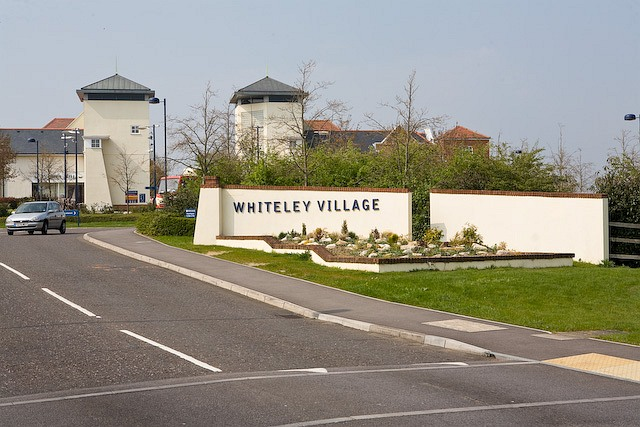
- (Clockwise from top) Winchester skyline, New Alresford Broad Street, Whiteley Village entrance, Bishops Waltham Cross Street

- Coat of arms

- Winchester shown within Hampshire
- Sovereign state: United Kingdom
- Country: England
- Region: South East England
- Non-metropolitan county: Hampshire
- Status: Non-metropolitan district, Borough, City time immemorial
- Admin HQ: Winchester

Government
  - Type: Non-metropolitan district council
  - Body: Winchester City Council
  - MPs: Danny Chambers; Suella Braverman; Paul Holmes

Area
  - Total: 255.20 sq mi (660.97 km^{2})
  - Rank: 51st (of 296)

Population (2025)
  - Total: 136,856
  - Rank: 182nd (of 296)
  - Density: 536.27/sq mi (207.05/km^{2})

Ethnicity (2021)
  - Ethnic groups: List: 93.6% White; 3.1% Asian; 2% Mixed; 0.7% other; 0.6% Black

Religion (2021)
  - Religion: List: 48.6% Christianity; 42.2% no religion; 6.3% not stated; 0.7% Hinduism; 0.7% Islam; 0.6% Buddhism; 0.5% other; 0.2% Judaism; 0.1% Sikhism
- Time zone: UTC0 (GMT)
  - Summer (DST): UTC+1 (BST)
- ONS code: 24UP (ONS); E07000094 (GSS)
- OS grid reference: SU485295

Winchester (/ˈwɪntʃɪstər/), or the City of Winchester, is a local government district with city status in Hampshire, England.

The district is named after its main settlement of Winchester, which is where the council is based and is also the county town of Hampshire. The city boundaries also encompass a large surrounding rural area, including the towns of New Alresford and Whiteley and numerous villages.

Parts of the district lie within the South Downs National Park. The neighbouring districts are Basingstoke and Deane, East Hampshire, Havant, Portsmouth, Fareham, Eastleigh and Test Valley.

== History ==
Winchester was an ancient borough, which had additionally held city status from time immemorial. The city traces its history to the Roman Era, developing from the town of Venta Belgarum. It saw historic significance from its reconstruction under Alfred the Great in the 9th century and grew in prominence. The office of Mayor of Winchester was created sometime between 1190 and 1200, making it the second oldest mayoralty in England, after London. Winchester saw a decline after plague swept the country, but began to recover from the 19th century.

The borough was reformed to become a municipal borough in 1836 under the Municipal Corporations Act 1835, which reformed most boroughs across the country. It had its territory enlarged at the same time to bring developing suburbs within the city boundary. The borough was significantly enlarged in 1932, absorbing Weeke and gaining territory from several other surrounding parishes.

The modern district was formed on 1 April 1974 under the Local Government Act 1972, covering the whole area of two former districts and parts of a third, which were all abolished at the same time:

- Droxford Rural District
- Winchester Municipal Borough
- Winchester Rural District (except parishes of Botley, Bursledon, Fair Oak, Hamble, Hedge End, Hound and West End, which went to Eastleigh)

The new district was named Winchester after its largest settlement. Winchester's borough status passed to the enlarged district from its creation, allowing the chair of the council to take the title of mayor, continuing Winchester's series of mayors dating back to the twelfth century. The city status formerly held by the municipal borough of Winchester was also transferred to the whole of the new district from its creation, allowing the council to call itself Winchester City Council.

In March 2026, the government announced that it would abolish the district in 2028 as part of local government reform across Hampshire. These proposals were withdrawn in September 2026.

== Governance ==
Winchester City Council

Type
- Type: Non-metropolitan district

Leadership
- Mayor: Jamie Scott, Liberal Democrat since 20 May 2026
- Leader: Martin Tod, Liberal Democrat since 18 May 2022
- Chief Executive: Laura Taylor since January 2017

Structure
- Seats: 45 councillors
- Political groups: Administration (36) Liberal Democrat (36) Other parties (9) Independent & Green Group (5) Independent (3) Green (2) Conservative (4)

Elections
- Voting system: First past the post
- Last election: May 2026

Meeting place
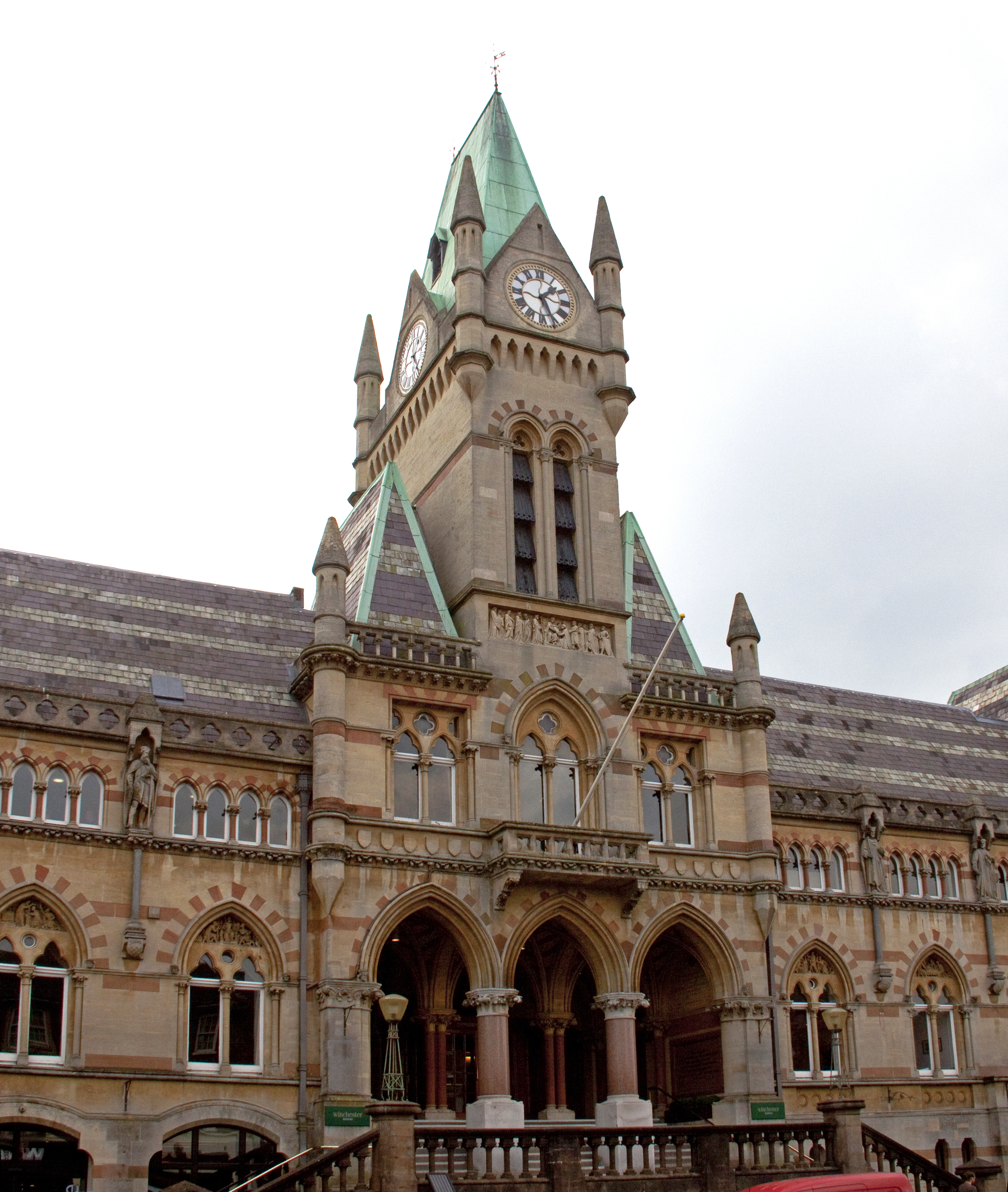
- Guildhall, The Broadway, High Street, Winchester, SO23 9GH

Website
- www.winchester.gov.uk

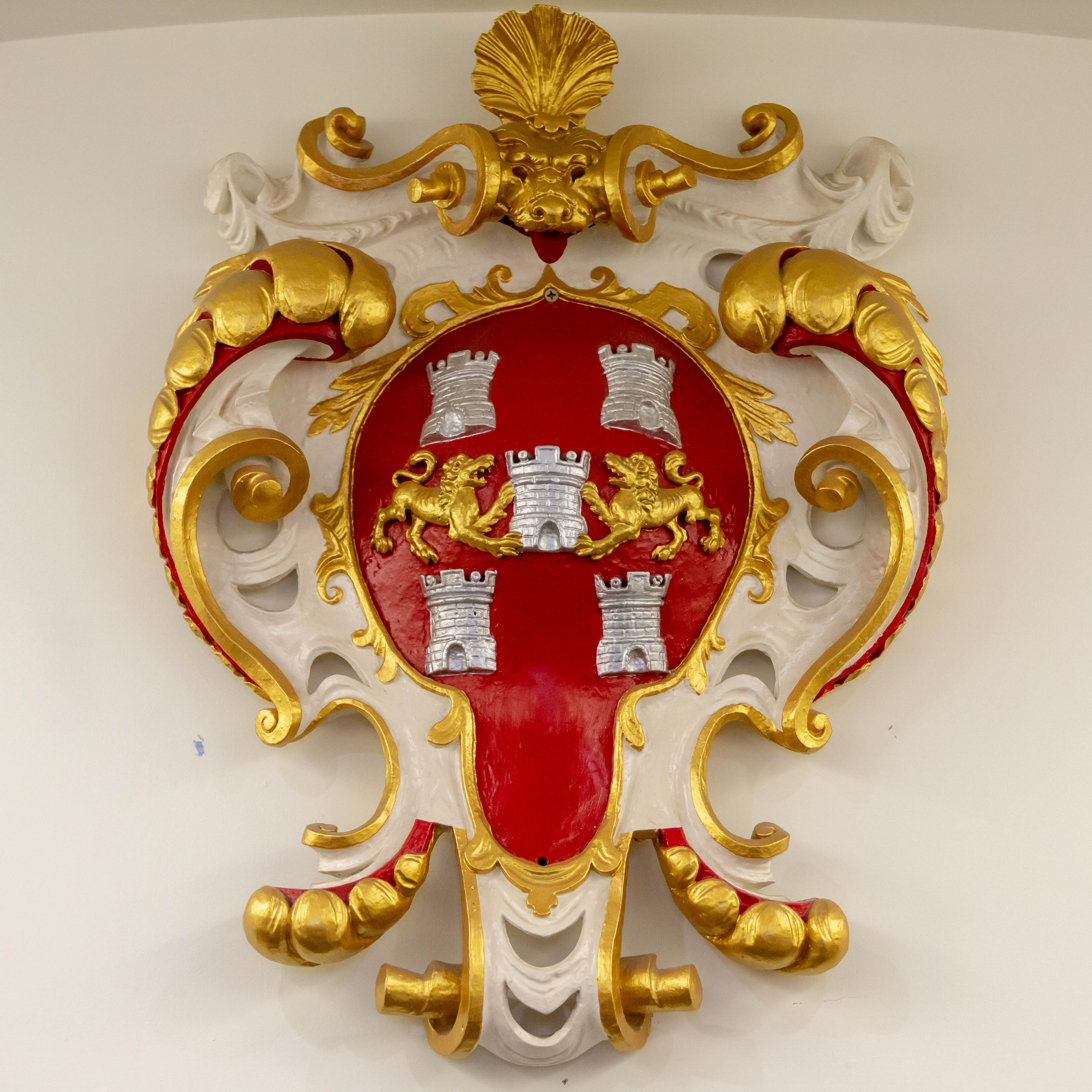
The City Council's coat of arms, displayed in Winchester Guildhall

Winchester City Council provides district-level services. County-level services are provided by Hampshire County Council. Much of the district is covered by civil parishes, which form a third tier of local government.

In the parts of the district within the South Downs National Park, town planning is the responsibility of the South Downs National Park Authority. The district council appoints one of its councillors to serve on the 27-person National Park Authority.

=== Political control ===
Political control of the council since the 1974 reforms has been as follows:

Party in control	Years
Independent	1974–1976
No overall control	1976–1979
Conservative	1979–1987
No overall control	1987–1995
Liberal Democrats	1995–2004
No overall control	2004–2006
Conservative	2006–2010
Liberal Democrats	2010–2011
No overall control	2011–2012
Conservative	2012–2014
No overall control	2014–2015
Conservative	2015–2019
Liberal Democrats	2019–present

=== Leadership ===
The role of mayor of Winchester is now largely ceremonial, with political leadership instead provided by the leader of the council. The leaders since 1979 have been:

Councillor	Party	From	To
Ken Penman	Conservative	1979	May 1987
Georgie Busher	Conservative	May 1987	May 1990
Allan Mitchell	Liberal Democrats	May 1994	May 1998
John Steel	Liberal Democrats	May 1998	May 2001
Rodney Sabine	Liberal Democrats	May 2001	May 2002
Sheila Campbell	Liberal Democrats	May 2002	May 2006
George Beckett	Conservative	17 May 2006	May 2010
Kelsey Learney	Liberal Democrats	19 May 2010	May 2011
George Beckett	Conservative	18 May 2011	May 2012
Keith Wood	Conservative	16 May 2012	May 2014
Rob Humby	Conservative	4 Jun 2014	17 Feb 2015
Frank Pearson	Conservative	19 Feb 2015	20 May 2015
Stephen Godfrey	Conservative	20 May 2015	Jan 2017
Caroline Horrill	Conservative	11 Jan 2017	May 2019
Lucille Thompson	Liberal Democrats	15 May 2019	May 2022
Martin Tod	Liberal Democrats	18 May 2022	

=== Composition ===
Following the 2026 election,, the composition of the council was:

Party	Councillors
Liberal Democrats	36
Conservative	4
Green	4
Independent	1
Total	45

As of October 2026, the composition of the council is:

Party	Councillors
Liberal Democrats	36
Conservative	4
Independent	3
Green	2
Total	45

The next elections are due in 2027.

=== Elections ===
Since the last boundary changes in 2016 the council has comprised 45 councillors representing 16 wards, with each ward electing two or three councillors. Elections are held three years out of every four, with roughly a third of the council elected each time for a four year term of office. Hampshire County Council elections are held in the fourth year of the cycle when there are no city council elections.

Since 2024, the City of Winchester has straddled three parliamentary constituencies. Winchester constituency covers most of the district area, including 13 of the 16 City Council wards of the district. Hamble Valley constituency lies mostly within the boroughs of Eastleigh and Fareham, but also includes Winchester's Whiteley and Shedfield ward. Fareham and Waterlooville constituency lies mostly in the Fareham and Havant districts, but also includes Winchester's Denmead and Southwick & Wickham wards. Since the boundaries were introduced in 2024, Winchester constituency has been represented by Danny Chambers, Hamble Valley has been represented by Paul Holmes and Fareham and Waterlooville by Suella Braverman.

=== Premises ===
The council meets at Winchester Guildhall, on the section of High Street known as The Broadway. The main building was built between 1871 and 1875. The council's main offices are in an adjoining modern building called City Offices, to the rear of the Guildhall on Colebrook Street.

== Demographics ==
Population pyramid of the City of Winchester

A Legatum Prosperity Index published by the Legatum Institute in October 2016 showed the City of Winchester as the third most prosperous council area in the United Kingdom, after the Borough of Waverley and Mole Valley.

=== Ethnicity ===
Ethnic Group	1991		2001		2011	
Ethnic Group	Number	%	Number	%	Number	%
White: Total	95,427	99%	104,907	97.8%	111,577	95.7%
White: British	–	–	101,689	94.8%	107,070	91.8%
White: Irish	–	–	750		733	
White: Gypsy or Irish Traveller	–	–	–	–	263	
White: Other	–	–	2,468		3,511	
Asian or Asian British: Total	563	0.6%	1,063	1%	2,639	2.3%
Asian or Asian British: Indian	144		382		665	
Asian or Asian British: Pakistani	31		44		92	
Asian or Asian British: Bangladeshi	80		180		222	
Asian or Asian British: Chinese	142		324		745	
Asian or Asian British: Other Asian	166		133		915	
Black or Black British: Total	147	0.2%	270	0.3%	457	0.4%
Black or Black British: Caribbean	54		118		147	
Black or Black British: African	41		126		250	
Black or Black British: Other Black	52		26		60	
Mixed or British Mixed: Total	–	–	708	0.7%	1,626	1.4%
Mixed: White and Black Caribbean	–	–	142		321	
Mixed: White and Black African	–	–	86		180	
Mixed: White and Asian	–	–	283		684	
Mixed: Other Mixed	–	–	197		441	
Other: Total	249	0.3%	274	0.3%	296	0.3%
Other: Arab	–	–	–	–	110	
Other: Any other ethnic group	249	0.3%	274	0.3%	186	
Total	96,386	100%	107,222	100%	116,595	100%

== Parishes ==
Map of the parishes of Winchester. The unparished area of Winchester town is in white.

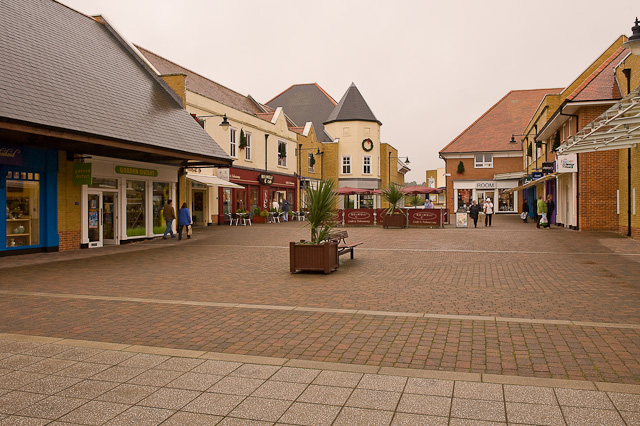
Whiteley, the district's second largest settlement, being a new town developed from the 1980s that partly straddles the neighbouring borough of Fareham

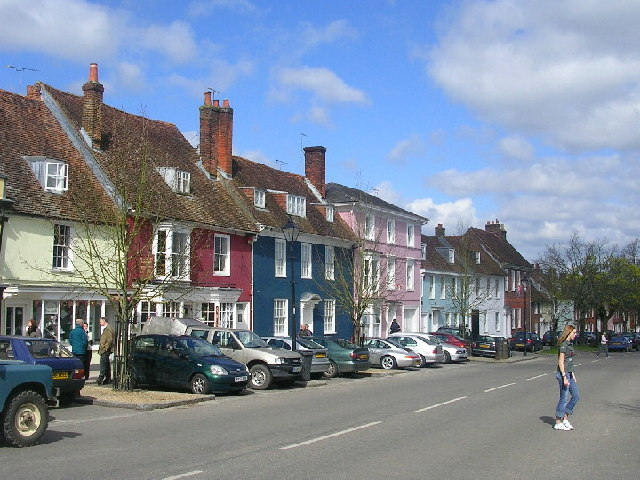
New Alresford, the district's other town

Much of the borough is covered by civil parishes. The main part of the Winchester urban area, roughly corresponding to the pre-1974 borough, is an unparished area. The council runs a "Winchester Town Forum" for this area to discuss local matters in that area in the absence of a parish council. The parish councils for New Alresford and Whiteley have declared their parishes to be towns, allowing them to take the style "town council". Some of the smaller parishes have a parish meeting rather than a parish council.

The parishes are:

- Badger Farm
- Beauworth
- Bighton
- Bishop's Waltham
- Bishops Sutton
- Boarhunt
- Bramdean and Hinton Ampner
- Cheriton
- Chilcomb
- Colden Common
- Compton and Shawford
- Corhampton & Meonstoke
- Crawley
- Curdridge
- Denmead
- Droxford
- Durley
- Exton
- Hambledon
- Headbourne Worthy
- Hursley
- Itchen Stoke and Ovington
- Itchen Valley
- Kilmeston
- Kings Worthy
- Littleton and Harestock
- Micheldever
- New Alresford
- Newlands
- Northington
- Old Alresford
- Oliver's Battery
- Otterbourne
- Owslebury
- Shedfield
- Soberton
- South Wonston
- Southwick and Widley
- Sparsholt
- Swanmore
- Tichborne
- Twyford
- Upham
- Warnford
- West Meon
- Whiteley
- Wickham and Knowle
- Wonston
