= Hampshire County Council elections =

Local government elections in Hampshire, England

Hampshire County Council in England is elected every four years. Since the boundary changes in 2005, 78 councillors have been elected from 75 wards, with further boundary changes in 2017.

== Council composition ==
Composition of the council
Year	Conservative	Liberal Democrats (Note: Includes totals for the predecessors of the Liberal Democrats, the Liberal Party and SDP (both of which participated in the Alliance).)	Labour	Reform UK	UKIP	Independents & Others	Council control after election
Local government reorganisation; council established (97 seats)
1973	54	6	27	–	–	10	Conservative
1977	88	0	7	–	–	2	Conservative
New division boundaries (102 seats)
1981	62	7	31	–	–	2	Conservative
1985	50	31	19	–	–	2	No overall control
1989	57	25	19	–	–	1	Conservative
1993	29	48	24	–	–	1	No overall control
Portsmouth and Southampton become unitary authorities (74 seats)
1997	43	21	8	–	0	2	Conservative
2001	46	19	9	–	0	0	Conservative
New division boundaries (78 seats)
2005	47	26	4	–	0	1	Conservative
2009	51	25	1	–	0	1	Conservative
2013	45	17	4	–	10	2 (Note: Including 1 Community Campaign (Hart))	Conservative
2017	56	19	2	–	0	1 (Note: 1 Community Campaign (Hart))	No overall control
2021	56	17	3	–	0	2 (Note: Including 1 Whitehill & Borden Community Party)	Conservative
2026 (Note: Delayed from 2025.)	27	26	1	20	0	4 (Note: Including 1 Green, 1 Whitehill & Borden Community Party and 1 Community Campaign (Hart))	No overall control

== Council elections ==
- 2001 Hampshire County Council election
- 2005 Hampshire County Council election (boundary changes increased the number of seats by 2)
- 2009 Hampshire County Council election
- 2013 Hampshire County Council election
- 2017 Hampshire County Council election (boundary changes)
- 2021 Hampshire County Council election
- 2026 Hampshire County Council election

== County result maps ==
2005 results map

2009 results map

2013 results map

2017 results map

2021 results map

2026 results map

== By-election results ==
=== 1997–2001 ===
Catherington by-election, 28 May 1998
Party	Candidate	Votes	%	±%
Liberal Democrats		1,674	48.7	+6.0
Conservative		1,628	47.3	+1.8
Labour		138	4.0	−7.8
Majority		46	1.4	
Turnout		3,440	22.0	
Liberal Democrats gain from Conservative		Swing		

Aldershot North by-election, 16 February 1999
Party	Candidate	Votes	%	±%
Conservative		742	43.2	+5.9
Labour		564	32.8	−2.4
Liberal Democrats		347	20.2	−5.2
Independent		64	3.7	+3.7
Majority		178	10.4	
Turnout		1,717	16.5	
Conservative hold		Swing		

Andover North by-election, 16 December 1999
Party	Candidate	Votes	%	±%
Conservative		741	47.3	+10.9
Liberal Democrats		554	35.4	+5.5
Labour		270	17.3	−12.8
Majority		187	11.9	
Turnout		1,565	10.6	
Conservative hold		Swing		

Basingstoke North by-election, 4 May 2000
Party	Candidate	Votes	%	±%
Labour		1,107	51.1	−3.4
Conservative		617	28.5	+2.6
Liberal Democrats		443	20.4	+1.8
Majority		490	22.6	
Turnout		2,167	20.2	
Conservative hold		Swing		

Fleet by-election, 30 November 2000
Party	Candidate	Votes	%	±%
Conservative	John Stocks	1,044	63.9	+28.2
Liberal Democrats	Helen Alley	373	22.8	+8.0
Labour	Peter Cotton	217	13.3	+6.5
Majority		671	41.1	
Turnout		1,634	13.8	
Conservative gain from Independent		Swing		

=== 2001–2005 ===
Rower by-election, 17 January 2002
Party	Candidate	Votes	%	±%
Labour		1,606	68.3	+11.9
Conservative		639	27.2	−6.2
Liberal Democrats		107	4.5	−5.7
Majority		967	41.1	
Turnout		2,352	21.7	
Labour hold		Swing		

Basingstoke North West by-election, 6 February 2003
Party	Candidate	Votes	%	±%
Liberal Democrats	John Shaw	1,223	38.6	+11.8
Conservative	Harry Robinson	1,126	35.5	+4.2
Labour	Julie Johnson	824	26.0	−15.9
Majority		98	3.1	
Turnout		3,174	28.5	
Liberal Democrats gain from Labour		Swing		

Fawley by-election, 5 February 2004
Party	Candidate	Votes	%	±%
Liberal Democrats	Lee Dunsdon	1,796	66.9	+21.0
Conservative	Alexis McEvoy	801	29.8	−7.7
Labour	Alan Goodfellow	87	3.2	−13.5
Majority		995	37.1	
Turnout		2,684	25.0	
Liberal Democrats hold		Swing		

Battins & Bondfield by-election, 2 December 2004
Party	Candidate	Votes	%	±%
Liberal Democrats	Ann Buckley	978	56.6	+36.2
Labour		433	25.0	−31.0
Conservative		285	16.5	−7.0
Green		33	1.9	+1.9
Majority		545	31.6	
Turnout		1,729	17.2	
Liberal Democrats gain from Labour		Swing		

=== 2009–2013 ===
Andover South by-election, 21 October 2010
Party	Candidate	Votes	%	±%
Conservative	David Drew	1,183	42.7	−6.4
Liberal Democrats	Maureen Comber	1,111	40.1	+17.7
Labour	John Newland	245	8.8	+1.7
UKIP	Anthony McCabe	233	8.4	−13.0
Majority		72	2.6	
Turnout		2,772		
Conservative hold		Swing		

Lee by-election, 5 May 2011
Party	Candidate	Votes	%	±%
Conservative	Graham Burgess	3,080	59.6	−6.3
Liberal Democrats	Angela Whitbread	1,227	23.8	−2.0
Labour	Graham Giles	858	16.6	+8.3
Majority		1,853	35.9	
Turnout		5,165		
Conservative hold		Swing		

Headley by-election, 15 September 2011
Party	Candidate	Votes	%	±%
Conservative	Ferris Cowper	1,588	64.6	+0.9
Liberal Democrats	Maureen Comber	290	11.8	−19.3
Labour	John Tough	258	10.5	+5.3
Green	Neville Taylor	178	7.2	+7.2
JAC	Don Jerrard	146	5.9	+5.9
Majority		1,298	52.8	
Turnout		2,460		
Conservative hold		Swing		

Winchester Southern Parishes by-election, 9 February 2012
Party	Candidate	Votes	%	±%
Conservative	Patricia Stallard	1,661	53.8	−3.9
Liberal Democrats	Vivian Achwal	1,038	33.6	+6.5
UKIP	Stephen Harris	133	4.3	−7.9
Green	John Vivian	130	4.2	+4.2
Labour	David Picton-Jones	124	4.0	+0.9
Majority		623	20.2	
Turnout		3,086		
Conservative hold		Swing		

=== 2013–2017 ===
Petersfield Butser by-election, 12 March 2014
Party	Candidate	Votes	%	±%
Conservative	Ken Moon	1,156	37.3	−1.4
UKIP	David Alexander	720	23.2	+0.7
Liberal Democrats	Richard Robinson	685	22.1	+1.1
Labour	Bill Organ	322	10.4	+1.2
Green	Adam Harper	220	7.1	−1.5
Majority		436	14.1	
Turnout		3,103		
Conservative hold		Swing		

Andover West by-election, 7 May 2015
Party	Candidate	Votes	%	±%
Conservative	Zilliah Brooks	5,208	57.5	+11.9
UKIP	Christine Forrester	1,846	20.4	−18.0
Labour	Michael Mumford	1,304	14.4	+5.0
Green	Dean Marriner	698	7.7	+7.7
Majority		3,362	37.1	
Turnout		9,056		
Conservative hold		Swing		

Chandler's Ford by-election, 22 October 2015
Party	Candidate	Votes	%	±%
Conservative	Judith Grajewski	2,074	49.3	+10.2
Liberal Democrats	James Duguid	1,493	35.5	+3.8
UKIP	John Edwards	358	8.5	−13.3
Labour	Sarah Smith	285	6.8	+2.0
Majority		581	13.8	
Turnout		4,210		
Conservative hold		Swing		

Fareham Town by-election, 5 May 2016
Party	Candidate	Votes	%	±%
Conservative	Christopher Matthews	4,408	41.9	+9.4
UKIP	Paul Sturgess	2,164	20.6	−8.6
Liberal Democrats	Peter Trott	1,905	18.1	−5.4
Labour	James Carr	1,360	12.9	+3.6
Green	David Harrison	673	6.4	+0.9
Majority		2,244	21.4	
Turnout		10,510		
Conservative hold		Swing		

Headley by-election, 5 May 2016
Party	Candidate	Votes	%	±%
Conservative	Floss Mitchell	2,201	51.0	−6.0
Liberal Democrats	Trevor Maroney	1,321	30.6	+20.6
UKIP	Peter Baillie	791	18.3	−5.7
Majority		880	20.4	
Turnout		4,313		
Conservative hold		Swing		

=== 2021–2026 ===
Purbrook and Stakes South by-election, 4 May 2023
Party	Candidate	Votes	%	±%
Conservative	Ryan Brent	1,484	47.1	−18.6
Liberal Democrats	Adrian Tansom	866	27.5	+17.8
Labour	Munazza Faiz	802	25.4	+9.3
Majority		618	19.6	
Turnout		3,152		
Conservative hold		Swing		

Fareham Sarisbury by-election, 2 May 2024
Party	Candidate	Votes	%	±%
Conservative	Joanne Burton	2,096	46.7	−10.7
Liberal Democrats	Graham Everdell	1,542	34.4	+21.5
Labour	Verden Meldrum	592	13.2	+0.8
Independent	Nick Gregory	256	5.7	+5.7
Majority		554	12.3	
Turnout		4,486		
Conservative hold		Swing		

Meon Valley by-election, 2 May 2024
Party	Candidate	Votes	%	±%
Green	Malcolm Wallace	2,083	35.8	+12.6
Liberal Democrats	Vivian Achwal	1,906	32.8	+12.5
Conservative	Neil Bolton	1,630	28.0	−23.8
Labour	Oliver Hirsch	199	3.4	−1.3
Majority		177	3.0	
Turnout		5,818		
Green gain from Conservative		Swing		

Bishops Waltham by-election, 31 October 2024
Party	Candidate	Votes	%	±%
Liberal Democrats	Jonathan Williams	2,210	52.2	+28.6
Conservative	Neil Bolton	1,431	33.8	−23.1
Green	Alex Ellis	477	11.3	−1.9
Labour	Steve Haines	115	2.7	−3.6
Majority		779	18.4	
Turnout		4,233		
Liberal Democrats gain from Conservative		Swing		

Winchester Eastgate by-election, 1 May 2025
Party	Candidate	Votes	%	±%
Liberal Democrats	Paula Ferguson	2,027	44.3	−4.1
Green	Lorraine Estelle	1,033	22.6	+13.1
Conservative	Ian Tait	786	17.2	−15.1
Reform	Russ Kitching	577	12.6	+12.6
Labour	Peter Marsh	152	3.3	−4.5
Majority		994	21.7	
Turnout		4,575		
Liberal Democrats hold		Swing		

Yateley East and Blackwater by-election, 1 May 2025
Party	Candidate	Votes	%	±%
Liberal Democrats	Stuart Bailey	2,410	49.0	−8.3
Reform	Trevor Lloyd-Jones	1,380	28.0	+28.0
Conservative	Sue Perkins	708	14.4	−22.0
Green	Samantha Davis	204	4.1	+4.1
Labour	Robbie Wiltshire	203	4.1	+4.1
Libertarian	Alex Zychowski	16	0.3	+0.3
Majority		1,030	20.9	
Turnout		4,921		
Liberal Democrats hold		Swing		
