= 1973 Hampshire County Council election =

1973 English local election

- 12 April 1973

All 97 seats to Hampshire County Council 49 seats needed for a majority
| | First party | Second party |
|---|---|---|
| Party | Conservative | Labour |
| Seats won | 55 | 26 |
| Popular vote | 123,700 | 95,863 |
| Percentage | 46.0% | 35.7% |
| | Third party | Fourth party |
| Party | Independent | Liberal |
| Seats won | 8 | 6 |
| Popular vote | 17,309 | 26,839 |
| Percentage | 6.4% | 9.9% |
Council control after election
Freddie Emery-Wallis
Conservative

Elections to Hampshire County Council took place on 12 April 1973 as part of the 1973 United Kingdom local elections. All 97 seats were up for election, with each ward returning either one or two councillors by first-past-the-post voting for a four-year term of office. These were the first to be held after the Local Government Act 1972, which reformed local councils and their boundaries. The election saw the Conservatives form a majority administration with 55 seats.

== Summary ==
=== Election result ===
1973 Hampshire County Council election
| Party | Candidates | Seats | Gains | Losses | Net gain/loss | Seats % | Votes % | Votes | +/− |
|---|---|---|---|---|---|---|---|---|---|
| Conservative | 91 | 55 | | | | 56.7 | 56.7 | 123,700 | – |
| Labour | 70 | 26 | | | | 26.8 | 35.7 | 95,863 | – |
| Liberal | 20 | 6 | | | | 6.2 | 10.0 | 26,839 | – |
| Independent | 14 | 8 | | | | 8.2 | 6.4 | 17,309 | – |
| Residents | 14 | 2 | | | | 2.1 | 1.7 | 4,619 | – |
| Ind. Conservative | 1 | 0 | | | | 0 | 0.2 | 436 | – |
| Communist | 1 | 0 | | | | 0 | 0.1 | 123 | – |

== Results by ward ==
=== Basingstoke and Deane ===
==== Basingstoke East ====
Basingstoke East
| Party | Candidate | Votes | % | ±% |
|---|---|---|---|---|
| Conservative | D. Keep | 1,998 | 69.7 | |
| Labour | T. Young | 870 | 30.3 | |
| Majority | | 1,128 | 39.3 | |
| Conservative win (new seat) | | | | |

==== Basingstoke North ====
Basingstoke North
| Party | Candidate | Votes | % | ±% |
|---|---|---|---|---|
| Labour | I. Corfin | 1,776 | 49.9 | |
| Liberal | W. Sweetman | 1,090 | 30.6 | |
| Conservative | H. Wheatley | 695 | 19.5 | |
| Majority | | 686 | 19.26 | |
| Labour win (new seat) | | | | |

==== Basingstoke West ====
Basingstoke West
| Party | Candidate | Votes | % | ±% |
|---|---|---|---|---|
| Labour | R. Donnelly | 2,807 | 50.8 | |
| Conservative | A. Barron | 2,718 | 49.2 | |
| Majority | | 89 | 1.61 | |
| Labour win (new seat) | | | | |

==== Candover ====
Candover
| Party | Candidate | Votes | % | ±% |
|---|---|---|---|---|
| Conservative | M. Boyle | Unopposed | | |
| Majority | | | | |
| Turnout | | | | |
| Conservative win (new seat) | | | | |

==== Kingsclere & Whitchurch No. 1 ====
Kingsclere & Whitchurch No. 1
| Party | Candidate | Votes | % | ±% |
|---|---|---|---|---|
| Independent | Lord Porchester | 3,124 | 78.2 | |
| Labour | S. Rogers | 871 | 21.8 | |
| Majority | | 2,253 | 56.31 | |
| Independent win (new seat) | | | | |

==== Kingsclere & Whitchurch No. 2 ====
Kingsclere & Whitchurch No. 1
| Party | Candidate | Votes | % | ±% |
|---|---|---|---|---|
| Independent | M. Walford | 1,232 | 70.9 | |
| Labour | P. Jones | 505 | 29.1 | |
| Majority | | 727 | 41.85 | |
| Independent win (new seat) | | | | |

==== Loddon ====
Loddon
| Party | Candidate | Votes | % | ±% |
|---|---|---|---|---|
| Conservative | J. Jack | Unopposed | | |
| Majority | | | | |
| Turnout | | | | |
| Conservative win (new seat) | | | | |

=== East Hampshire ===
==== Alton ====
Alton
| Party | Candidate | Votes | % | ±% |
|---|---|---|---|---|
| Conservative | J. Archer-Shee | 1,935 | 61.4 | |
| Labour | R. O'Connor | 1,214 | 38.6 | |
| Majority | | 721 | 22.89 | |
| Conservative win (new seat) | | | | |

==== Bramshott ====
Bramshott
| Party | Candidate | Votes | % | ±% |
|---|---|---|---|---|
| Independent | A. Jaffray | 1,512 | 42.8 | |
| Conservative | P Miles | 1,481 | 41.9 | |
| Labour | P. Dare | 539 | 15.3 | |
| Majority | | 31 | 0.87 | |
| Independent win (new seat) | | | | |

==== Catherington ====
Catherington
| Party | Candidate | Votes | % | ±% |
|---|---|---|---|---|
| Conservative | L. White | Unopposed | | |
| Majority | | | | |
| Turnout | | | | |
| Conservative win (new seat) | | | | |

==== Headley ====
Headley
| Party | Candidate | Votes | % | ±% |
|---|---|---|---|---|
| Conservative | B. Blacker | Unopposed | | |
| Majority | | | | |
| Turnout | | | | |
| Conservative win (new seat) | | | | |

==== Medstead & Selborne ====
Medstead & Selborne
| Party | Candidate | Votes | % | ±% |
|---|---|---|---|---|
| Conservative | J. Scott | Unopposed | | |
| Majority | | | | |
| Turnout | | | | |
| Conservative win (new seat) | | | | |

==== Petersfield ====
Petersfield
| Party | Candidate | Votes | % | ±% |
|---|---|---|---|---|
| Conservative | H. Rose | 2,338 | 47.4 | |
| Labour | T. King | 1,032 | 20.9 | |
| Liberal | R. Quaife | 908 | 18.4 | |
| Independent | R. Digby | 653 | 13.2 | |
| Majority | | 1306 | 26.5 | |
| Conservative win (new seat) | | | | |

=== Eastleigh ===
==== Eastleigh East ====
Eastleigh East
| Party | Candidate | Votes | % | ±% |
|---|---|---|---|---|
| Labour | J. Davies | 2,230 | 48.9 | |
| Liberal | C. Taylor | 1,175 | 25.7 | |
| Conservative | H. Ford | 1,159 | 25.4 | |
| Majority | | 1,055 | 23.1 | |
| Turnout | | 4,564 | 49.7 | |
| Labour win (new seat) | | | | |

==== Eastleigh North ====
Eastleigh North
| Party | Candidate | Votes | % | ±% |
|---|---|---|---|---|
| Conservative | S. Vining | 3,687 | 43.7 | |
| Liberal | D. Costard | 3,404 | 40.4 | |
| Labour | D. Thomas | 1,338 | 15.9 | |
| Majority | | 283 | 3.4 | |
| Turnout | | 8,429 | 53.6 | |
| Conservative win (new seat) | | | | |

==== Eastleigh South ====
Eastleigh South
| Party | Candidate | Votes | % | ±% |
|---|---|---|---|---|
| Labour | S. Bartlet | 2,129 | 60.7 | |
| Liberal | R. Rickard | 780 | 22.2 | |
| Conservative | J Davies | 599 | 17.1 | |
| Majority | | 1349 | 38.5 | |
| Turnout | | 3508 | 44.0 | |
| Labour win (new seat) | | | | |

=== Fareham ===
==== Fareham East ====
Fareham East
| Party | Candidate | Votes | % | ±% |
|---|---|---|---|---|
| Conservative | R. Cooper | 1,980 | 59.5 | |
| Labour | J. Wearn | 1,345 | 40.5 | |
| Majority | | 635 | 19.1 | |
| Turnout | | 3325 | 35.0 | |
| Conservative win (new seat) | | | | |

==== Fareham North East ====
Fareham North East
| Party | Candidate | Votes | % | ±% |
|---|---|---|---|---|
| Conservative | K. Jarvis | Unopposed | | |
| Majority | | | | |
| Turnout | | | | |
| Conservative win (new seat) | | | | |

==== Fareham South West ====
Fareham South West
| Party | Candidate | Votes | % | ±% |
|---|---|---|---|---|
| Conservative | R. Allen | Unopposed | | |
| Majority | | | | |
| Turnout | | | | |
| Conservative win (new seat) | | | | |

==== Fareham Titchfield ====
Fareham Titchfield
| Party | Candidate | Votes | % | ±% |
|---|---|---|---|---|
| Conservative | R. Alexander | Unopposed | | |
| Majority | | | | |
| Turnout | | | | |
| Conservative win (new seat) | | | | |

==== Fareham West ====
Fareham West
| Party | Candidate | Votes | % | ±% |
|---|---|---|---|---|
| Residents | A Butler | 2,070 | 69.7 | |
| Conservative | A. Widdicome | 898 | 30.3 | |
| Majority | | 1172 | 39.5 | |
| Turnout | | 1,172 | 27.0 | |
| Residents win (new seat) | | | | |

=== Gosport ===
==== Gosport Alverstoke ====
Gosport Alverstoke
| Party | Candidate | Votes | % | ±% |
|---|---|---|---|---|
| Conservative | Alastair MacDonald Watson | 2,675 | 78.0 | |
| Labour | M. Hawkins | 753 | 22.0 | |
| Majority | | 1922 | 56.1 | |
| Turnout | | 3428 | 33.7 | |
| Registered electors | | 10,224 | | |
| Conservative win (new seat) | | | | |

==== Gosport Elson ====
Gosport Elson
| Party | Candidate | Votes | % | ±% |
|---|---|---|---|---|
| Labour | R. Borass | 2,503 | 55.5 | |
| Conservative | R. Millard | 2,005 | 44.5 | |
| Majority | | 498 | 11.0 | |
| Turnout | | 4508 | 29.3 | |
| Registered electors | | 15,214 | | |
| Labour win (new seat) | | | | |

==== Gosport Hardway ====
Gosport Hardway
| Party | Candidate | Votes | % | ±% |
|---|---|---|---|---|
| Conservative | V. Neal | 1,061 | 52.2 | |
| Labour | H. Cooley | 970 | 47.8 | |
| Majority | | 91 | 4.5 | |
| Turnout | | 2,031 | 30.6 | |
| Registered electors | | 6,575 | | |
| Conservative win (new seat) | | | | |

==== Gosport Leesland ====
Gosport Leesland
| Party | Candidate | Votes | % | ±% |
|---|---|---|---|---|
| Labour | J. Burton | 2,023 | 61.6 | |
| Conservative | B. Carter | 1,259 | 38.4 | |
| Majority | | 764 | 23.3 | |
| Turnout | | 3,282 | 31.4 | |
| Registered electors | | 10,427 | | |
| Labour win (new seat) | | | | |

==== Gosport Town ====
Gosport Town
| Party | Candidate | Votes | % | ±% |
|---|---|---|---|---|
| Labour | S. Leyland | 1,443 | 55.9 | |
| Conservative | G. Flory | 1,138 | 44.1 | |
| Majority | | 305 | 11.8 | |
| Turnout | | 2781 | 11.8 | |
| Registered electors | | 5.984 | | |
| Labour win (new seat) | | | | |

=== Hart ===
==== Fleet ====
Fleet
| Party | Candidate | Votes | % | ±% |
|---|---|---|---|---|
| Conservative | F. Graham-Taylor | Unopposed | | |
| Majority | | | | |
| Turnout | | | | |
| Conservative win (new seat) | | | | |

==== Hartley Wintney ====
Hartley Witney
| Party | Candidate | Votes | % | ±% |
|---|---|---|---|---|
| Conservative | J. Todd | Unopposed | | |
| Majority | | | | |
| Turnout | | | | |
| Conservative win (new seat) | | | | |

==== Odiham ====
Odiham
| Party | Candidate | Votes | % | ±% |
|---|---|---|---|---|
| Conservative | R. Bostock | Unopposed | | |
| Majority | | | | |
| Turnout | | | | |
| Conservative win (new seat) | | | | |

==== Yateley & Hawley ====
Yateley & Hawley
| Party | Candidate | Votes | % | ±% |
|---|---|---|---|---|
| Conservative | R. Yeomans | 1,145 | 61.8 | |
| Labour | D. Somerville | 708 | 38.2 | |
| Majority | | 437 | 23.6 | |
| Turnout | | 1853 | 12.4 | |
| Registered electors | | 14,556 | | |
| Conservative win (new seat) | | | | |

=== Havant ===
==== Battins & Bondfield ====
Battins & Bondfield
| Party | Candidate | Votes | % | ±% |
|---|---|---|---|---|
| Labour | W. George | 1,104 | 57.5 | |
| Liberal | D. Dyer | 815 | 42.5 | |
| Majority | | 289 | 15.1 | |
| Turnout | | 1,919 | 22.8 | |
| Registered electors | | 10,224 | | |
| Labour win (new seat) | | | | |

==== Bedhampton & Barncroft ====
Bedhampton & Barncroft
| Party | Candidate | Votes | % | ±% |
|---|---|---|---|---|
| Liberal | R. Fairhead | 1,232 | 33.6 | |
| Labour | B. Smith | 1,065 | 29.0 | |
| Conservative | H. Gregory | 934 | 25.5 | |
| Ind. Conservative | M. Brewer | 436 | 11.9 | |
| Majority | | 167 | 4.6 | |
| Turnout | | 3,667 | 34.3 | |
| Registered electors | | 10,680 | | |
| Liberal win (new seat) | | | | |

==== Hart Plain & Cowplain ====
Hart Plain & Cowplain
| Party | Candidate | Votes | % | ±% |
|---|---|---|---|---|
| Residents | J. Wigham | 2,194 | 53.9 | |
| Independent | E. Borrow | 1,023 | 25.2 | |
| Conservative | M. Todd | 850 | 20.9 | |
| Majority | | 167 | 4.6 | |
| Turnout | | 1,171 | 28.8 | |
| Registered electors | | 11,703 | | |
| Residents win (new seat) | | | | |

==== Havant & Warblington ====
Havant & Warblington
| Party | Candidate | Votes | % | ±% |
|---|---|---|---|---|
| Conservative | A. Reger | 2,728 | 58.1 | |
| Liberal | P. Williams | 1,968 | 41.9 | |
| Majority | | 760 | 16.2 | |
| Turnout | | 4,696 | 38.5 | |
| Registered electors | | 12,211 | | |
| Conservative win (new seat) | | | | |

==== Hayling ====
Hayling
| Party | Candidate | Votes | % | ±% |
|---|---|---|---|---|
| Independent | F. Martin | 1,866 | 52.2 | |
| Conservative | W. Venton | 1,447 | 40.5 | |
| Labour | I. Handscomb | 264 | 7.4 | |
| Majority | | 419 | 11.7 | |
| Turnout | | 3,577 | 11.7 | |
| Registered electors | | 9,470 | | |
| Independent win (new seat) | | | | |

==== Purbrook & Waterloo ====
Purbrook & Waterloo
| Party | Candidate | Votes | % | ±% |
|---|---|---|---|---|
| Independent | R. Wakeford | 2,374 | 67.9 | |
| Conservative | T. Williams | 1,123 | 32.1 | |
| Majority | | 1251 | 35.8 | |
| Turnout | | 3,497 | 35.8 | |
| Registered electors | | 12,814 | | |
| Independent win (new seat) | | | | |

==== Stockheath & Leigh Park ====
Stockheath & Leigh Park
| Party | Candidate | Votes | % | ±% |
|---|---|---|---|---|
| Labour | A. Slight | 815 | 54.2 | |
| Liberal | C. Hughes | 689 | 45.8 | |
| Majority | | 126 | 8.4 | |
| Turnout | | 1,504 | 15.4 | |
| Registered electors | | 9,115 | | |
| Independent win (new seat) | | | | |

=== New Forest ===
==== Brockenhurst ====
Brockenhurst
| Party | Candidate | Votes | % | ±% |
|---|---|---|---|---|
| Conservative | C. Townsend-Rose | 1,381 | 86.2 | |
| Labour | D. Halstead | 221 | 13.8 | |
| Majority | | 1,160 | 72.4 | |
| Turnout | | 1,602 | 23.7 | |
| Registered electors | | 7,353 | | |
| Conservative win (new seat) | | | | |

==== Fawley ====
Fawley
| Party | Candidate | Votes | % | ±% |
|---|---|---|---|---|
| Conservative | M. Drummond | 1,343 | 52.3 | |
| Labour | L. Guyatt | 1,224 | 47.7 | |
| Majority | | 119 | 4.6 | |
| Turnout | | 2,567 | 29.5 | |
| Registered electors | | 8,726 | | |
| Conservative win (new seat) | | | | |

==== Hythe ====
Hythe
| Party | Candidate | Votes | % | ±% |
|---|---|---|---|---|
| Liberal | A. Hayes | 1,656 | 37.2 | |
| Conservative | D. Mansbridge | 1,488 | 33.5 | |
| Labour | L. Gibbs | 1,303 | 29.3 | |
| Majority | | 168 | 3.8 | |
| Turnout | | 4,447 | 34.3 | |
| Registered electors | | 13,009 | | |
| Liberal win (new seat) | | | | |

==== Lymington Central ====
Lymington Central
| Party | Candidate | Votes | % | ±% |
|---|---|---|---|---|
| Conservative | A. Rice | Unopposed | | |
| Majority | | | | |
| Turnout | | | | |
| Conservative win (new seat) | | | | |

==== Lymington East ====
Lymington East
| Party | Candidate | Votes | % | ±% |
|---|---|---|---|---|
| Conservative | L. Hope-Jones | 2,467 | 73.8 | |
| Labour | M. Hernen | 876 | 26.2 | |
| Majority | | 1591 | 47.6 | |
| Turnout | | 3,343 | 36.0 | |
| Registered electors | | 8,900 | | |
| Conservative win (new seat) | | | | |

==== Lymington West ====
Lymington West
| Party | Candidate | Votes | % | ±% |
|---|---|---|---|---|
| Conservative | R. Alderson | Unopposed | | |
| Majority | | | | |
| Turnout | | | | |
| Conservative win (new seat) | | | | |

==== Lyndhurst ====
Lyndhurst
| Party | Candidate | Votes | % | ±% |
|---|---|---|---|---|
| Conservative | G. Hodgson | 1,597 | 66.6 | |
| Independent | F. Starmes | 591 | 24.6 | |
| Labour | R. Hewish | 211 | 8.8 | |
| Majority | | 1,006 | 41.9 | |
| Turnout | | 2,399 | 25.7 | |
| Registered electors | | 9,343 | | |
| Conservative win (new seat) | | | | |

==== Ringwood & Fordingbridge No. 1 ====
Ringwood & Fordingbridge No. 1
| Party | Candidate | Votes | % | ±% |
|---|---|---|---|---|
| Conservative | J. Holt | 2,049 | 80.1 | |
| Labour | P. Hayward | 509 | 19.9 | |
| Majority | | 1,540 | 60.2 | |
| Turnout | | 2,558 | 34.4 | |
| Registered electors | | 7,437 | | |
| Conservative win (new seat) | | | | |

==== Ringwood & Fordingbridge No. 2 ====
Ringwood & Fordingbridge
| Party | Candidate | Votes | % | ±% |
|---|---|---|---|---|
| Conservative | H. King | 1,590 | 55.8 | |
| Liberal | D. Broomfield | 643 | 22.6 | |
| Labour | M. Shutler | 616 | 21.6 | |
| Majority | | 943 | 33.2 | |
| Turnout | | 2,849 | 24.9 | |
| Registered electors | | 11,483 | | |
| Conservative win (new seat) | | | | |

==== Totton ====
Totton
| Party | Candidate | Votes | % | ±% |
|---|---|---|---|---|
| Liberal | J. Blackburn | 2,324 | 42.2 | |
| Labour | M. Bailey | 1,676 | 30.4 | |
| Conservative | J. Betteridge | 1,507 | 27.4 | |
| Majority | | 648 | 11.8 | |
| Turnout | | 5,507 | 40.5 | |
| Registered electors | | 13,604 | | |
| Liberal win (new seat) | | | | |

=== Portsmouth ===
==== Buckland ====
Buckland
| Party | Candidate | Votes | % | ±% |
|---|---|---|---|---|
| Labour | S. Rapson | 1,689 | 56.5 | |
| Conservative | L. Chambers | 1,300 | 43.5 | |
| Majority | | 389 | 13.0 | |
| Turnout | | 2,989 | 40.3 | |
| Registered electors | | 7,465 | | |
| Labour win (new seat) | | | | |

==== Cosham ====
Cosham
| Party | Candidate | Votes | % | ±% |
|---|---|---|---|---|
| Independent | P. Ashley | 2,002 | 52.3 | |
| Labour | J. Attrill | 936 | 24.4 | |
| Conservative | R. Pumphrey | 891 | 23.3 | |
| Majority | | 1,066 | 27.8 | |
| Turnout | | 3,829 | 42.0 | |
| Registered electors | | 9,133 | | |
| Independent win (new seat) | | | | |

==== Farlington ====
Farlington
| Party | Candidate | Votes | % | ±% |
|---|---|---|---|---|
| Conservative | E. Bateson | 2,933 | 74.9 | |
| Labour | C. Handscomb | 985 | 25.1 | |
| Majority | | 1,948 | 49.7 | |
| Turnout | | 3,918 | 37.7 | |
| Registered electors | | 10,547 | | |
| Conservative win (new seat) | | | | |

==== Fratton ====
Fratton
| Party | Candidate | Votes | % | ±% |
|---|---|---|---|---|
| Labour | Mike Hancock | 1,706 | 63.5 | |
| Conservative | S. Stebbing | 979 | 36.5 | |
| Majority | | 2,685 | 27.1 | |
| Turnout | | 2,685 | 35.1 | |
| Registered electors | | 7,724 | | |
| Labour win (new seat) | | | | |

==== Havelock ====
Havelock
| Party | Candidate | Votes | % | ±% |
|---|---|---|---|---|
| Labour | C. Johnstone | 2,104 | 53.3 | |
| Conservative | M. Sutcliff | 1,841 | 46.7 | |
| Majority | | 263 | 6.7 | |
| Turnout | | 3,945 | 43.2 | |
| Registered electors | | 9,197 | | |
| Labour win (new seat) | | | | |

==== Highland ====
Highland
| Party | Candidate | Votes | % | ±% |
|---|---|---|---|---|
| Conservative | A. Elliott | 1,867 | 54.1 | |
| Labour | B. Miller | 1,586 | 45.9 | |
| Majority | | 281 | 8.1 | |
| Turnout | | 3,453 | 34.3 | |
| Registered electors | | 10,180 | | |
| Conservative win (new seat) | | | | |

==== Kingston ====
Kingston
| Party | Candidate | Votes | % | ±% |
|---|---|---|---|---|
| Labour | R. Emmerson | 1,972 | 50.0 | |
| Conservative | R. Hancock | 1,971 | 50.0 | |
| Majority | | 1 | 0.0 | |
| Turnout | | 3,943 | 37.4 | |
| Registered electors | | 10,600 | | |
| Labour win (new seat) | | | | |

==== Meredith ====
Meredith
| Party | Candidate | Votes | % | ±% |
|---|---|---|---|---|
| Conservative | A. Hill | 2,349 | 57.6 | |
| Labour | W. Stillwell | 1,730 | 42.4 | |
| Majority | | 619 | 15.2 | |
| Turnout | | 4,079 | 37.2 | |
| Registered electors | | 11,100 | | |
| Conservative win (new seat) | | | | |

==== North End ====
North End
| Party | Candidate | Votes | % | ±% |
|---|---|---|---|---|
| Conservative | K. Hale | 1,948 | 46.9 | |
| Labour | B. Tyler | 1,700 | 40.9 | |
| Independent | W. Hunt | 507 | 12.2 | |
| Majority | | 248 | 6.0 | |
| Turnout | | 4,155 | 43.8 | |
| Registered electors | | 9,729 | | |
| Conservative win (new seat) | | | | |

==== Paulsgrove ====
Paulsgrove
| Party | Candidate | Votes | % | ±% |
|---|---|---|---|---|
| Labour | M. Prince | 1,717 | 53.8 | |
| Liberal | I. Young | 995 | 31.2 | |
| Conservative | M. Rendle | 478 | 15.0 | |
| Majority | | 722 | 22.6 | |
| Turnout | | 3,190 | 28.7 | |
| Registered electors | | 11,308 | | |
| Labour win (new seat) | | | | |

==== Portsmouth No. 1 ====
Portsmouth No.1
| Party | Candidate | Votes | % | ±% |
|---|---|---|---|---|
| Labour | E. Kelly | 3,911 | 58.8 | |
| Labour | A. White | 3,683 | | |
| Conservative | J. Marshall | 2,741 | 41.2 | |
| Conservative | A. Mos | 2,149 | | |
| Majority | | 1,170 | 17.6 | |
| Turnout | | 6,652 | 37.1 | |
| Registered electors | | 17,829 | | |
| Labour win (new seat) | | | | |
| Labour win (new seat) | | | | |

==== St. Jude ====
St. Jude
| Party | Candidate | Votes | % | ±% |
|---|---|---|---|---|
| Conservative | P. Loe | 1,401 | 72.3 | |
| Labour | M. Smith | 537 | 27.7 | |
| Majority | | 864 | 44.6 | |
| Turnout | | 1,938 | 23.4 | |
| Registered electors | | 8,300 | | |
| Conservative win (new seat) | | | | |

==== St. Simon ====
St Simon
| Party | Candidate | Votes | % | ±% |
|---|---|---|---|---|
| Conservative | D. Connors | 1,660 | 70.1 | |
| Labour | B. Armer | 708 | 29.9 | |
| Majority | | 952 | 40.2 | |
| Turnout | | 2368 | 29.4 | |
| Registered electors | | 8,100 | | |
| Conservative win (new seat) | | | | |

==== St. Thomas ====
St. Thomas
| Party | Candidate | Votes | % | ±% |
|---|---|---|---|---|
| Conservative | Freddie Emery-Wallis | 1,904 | 51.2 | |
| Labour | D. Killbery | 1,813 | 48.8 | |
| Majority | | 91 | 2.4 | |
| Turnout | | 3,717 | 36.9 | |
| Registered electors | | 10,153 | | |
| Conservative win (new seat) | | | | |

=== Rushmoor ===
==== Aldershot East ====
Aldershot East
| Party | Candidate | Votes | % | ±% |
|---|---|---|---|---|
| Conservative | J. Chrismas | 2,235 | 56.1 | |
| Labour | J. White | 1,750 | 43.9 | |
| Majority | | 485 | 12.2 | |
| Turnout | | 2,720 | 34.5 | |
| Registered electors | | 11,594 | | |
| Conservative win (new seat) | | | | |

==== Aldershot West ====
Aldershot West
| Party | Candidate | Votes | % | ±% |
|---|---|---|---|---|
| Liberal | R. Sharpe | 1,149 | 53.9 | |
| Labour | J. Broadbent | 984 | 46.1 | |
| Majority | | 165 | 7.7 | |
| Turnout | | 2,133 | 27.9 | |
| Registered electors | | 7,673 | | |
| Liberal win (new seat) | | | | |

==== Farnborough East ====
Farnborough East
| Party | Candidate | Votes | % | ±% |
|---|---|---|---|---|
| Conservative | D. Devereux | 1,682 | 63.4 | |
| Labour | G. Watkins | 746 | 28.1 | |
| Independent | J. Grant | 227 | 8.5 | |
| Majority | | 936 | 35.3 | |
| Turnout | | 2,655 | 19.4 | |
| Registered electors | | 13,617 | | |
| Conservative win (new seat) | | | | |

==== Farnborough West ====
Farnborough West
| Party | Candidate | Votes | % | ±% |
|---|---|---|---|---|
| Labour | H. Hewitt-Dutton | 2,532 | 50.1 | |
| Conservative | A. Bolt | 2,524 | 49.9 | |
| Majority | | 8 | 0.2 | |
| Turnout | | 5,056 | 35.5 | |
| Registered electors | | 14,219 | | |
| Labour win (new seat) | | | | |

=== Southampton ===
==== Southampton No. 1 ====
Southampton No. 1
| Party | Candidate | Votes | % | ±% |
|---|---|---|---|---|
| Labour | R. Hill | 1,633 | 52.1 | |
| Conservative | J. Curtis | 1,377 | 44.0 | |
| Communist | J. James | 123 | 3.9 | |
| Majority | | 256 | 8.2 | |
| Turnout | | 3133 | 27.0 | |
| Labour win (new seat) | | | | |

==== Southampton No. 2 ====
Southampton No. 2
| Party | Candidate | Votes | % | ±% |
|---|---|---|---|---|
| Labour | W. Couper | 1,381 | 45.0 | |
| Conservative | E. Mintram | 1,333 | 43.4 | |
| Residents | W. Roach | 355 | 11.6 | |
| Majority | | 48 | 1.6 | |
| Turnout | | 3,069 | 35.0 | |
| Labour win (new seat) | | | | |

==== Banister ====
Banister
| Party | Candidate | Votes | % | ±% |
|---|---|---|---|---|
| Conservative | E. Lewis | 1,158 | 60.8 | |
| Liberal | T. Sanders | 409 | 21.5 | |
| Labour | J. Poynter | 339 | 17.8 | |
| Majority | | 749 | 39.3 | |
| Turnout | | 1,906 | 29.0 | |
| Conservative win (new seat) | | | | |

==== Bassett ====
Bassett
| Party | Candidate | Votes | % | ±% |
|---|---|---|---|---|
| Conservative | N. Best | 2,462 | 69.0 | |
| Labour | P. Staples | 1,108 | 31.0 | |
| Majority | | 1,354 | 37.9 | |
| Turnout | | 3,569 | 36.0 | |
| Conservative win (new seat) | | | | |

==== Bitterne ====
Bitterne
| Party | Candidate | Votes | % | ±% |
|---|---|---|---|---|
| Labour | J. Williams | 2,203 | 52.2 | |
| Conservative | J. Young | 2,020 | 47.8 | |
| Majority | | 183 | 4.3 | |
| Turnout | | 4,223 | 31.0 | |
| Labour win (new seat) | | | | |

==== Coxford ====
Coxford
| Party | Candidate | Votes | % | ±% |
|---|---|---|---|---|
| Labour | R. McGuirk | 2,243 | 62.0 | |
| Conservative | D. Fountain | 1,374 | 38.0 | |
| Majority | | 869 | 24.0 | |
| Turnout | | 3,617 | 34.0 | |
| Labour win (new seat) | | | | |

==== Harefield ====
Harefield
| Party | Candidate | Votes | % | ±% |
|---|---|---|---|---|
| Conservative | J. Pitter | 1,823 | 53.2 | |
| Labour | G. Ranger | 1,605 | 46.8 | |
| Majority | | 218 | 6.4 | |
| Turnout | | 3,428 | 29.0 | |
| Conservative win (new seat) | | | | |

==== Millbrook ====
Millbrook
| Party | Candidate | Votes | % | ±% |
|---|---|---|---|---|
| Labour | A. Reynard | 1,556 | 50.5 | |
| Conservative | R. Marshall | 1,523 | 49.5 | |
| Majority | | 33 | 1.1 | |
| Turnout | | 3079 | 36.0 | |
| Labour win (new seat) | | | | |

==== Pear Tree and Bitterne ====
Pear Tree and Bitterne
| Party | Candidate | Votes | % | ±% |
|---|---|---|---|---|
| Labour | F. Billett | 1,639 | 54.7 | |
| Conservative | P. Franklin | 1,359 | 45.3 | |
| Majority | | 280 | 9.3 | |
| Turnout | | 2,998 | 35.0 | |
| Labour win (new seat) | | | | |

==== Portswood ====
Portswood
| Party | Candidate | Votes | % | ±% |
|---|---|---|---|---|
| Conservative | J. Barr | 1,450 | 49.6 | |
| Liberal | J. Wallis | 752 | 25.7 | |
| Labour | G. Webb | 720 | 24.6 | |
| Majority | | 698 | 23.9 | |
| Turnout | | 2,922 | 37 | |
| Conservative win (new seat) | | | | |

==== Redbridge ====
Redbridge
| Party | Candidate | Votes | % | ±% |
|---|---|---|---|---|
| Labour | J. Pimlott | 2,382 | 64.2 | |
| Conservative | D. Carter | 1,327 | 35.8 | |
| Majority | | 1,055 | 28.4 | |
| Turnout | | 3,709 | 28.0 | |
| Labour win (new seat) | | | | |

==== Shirley ====
Shirley
| Party | Candidate | Votes | % | ±% |
|---|---|---|---|---|
| Conservative | W. Dibben | 2,009 | 67.9 | |
| Labour | J. Rawlinson | 949 | 32.1 | |
| Majority | | 1,060 | 35.8 | |
| Turnout | | 2,958 | 38.0 | |
| Conservative win (new seat) | | | | |

==== Sholing ====
Sholing
| Party | Candidate | Votes | % | ±% |
|---|---|---|---|---|
| Labour | D. Speake | 2,163 | 64.7 | |
| Conservative | E. Tostevin | 1,180 | 35.3 | |
| Majority | | 983 | 29.4 | |
| Turnout | | 3,343 | 28.0 | |
| Labour win (new seat) | | | | |

==== St. Denys and Bitterne ====
St. Denys and Bitterne
| Party | Candidate | Votes | % | ±% |
|---|---|---|---|---|
| Conservative | D. Saunders | 1,385 | 57.5 | |
| Labour | B. Reed | 1,024 | 42.5 | |
| Majority | | 361 | 15.0 | |
| Turnout | | 2,409 | 37.0 | |
| Conservative win (new seat) | | | | |

==== Swaythling ====
Swaythling
| Party | Candidate | Votes | % | ±% |
|---|---|---|---|---|
| Labour | R. Russell | 1,360 | 55.1 | |
| Conservative | I. Lewis | 1,109 | 44.9 | |
| Majority | | 251 | 10.2 | |
| Turnout | | 2,469 | 27.0 | |
| Labour win (new seat) | | | | |

==== Woolston ====
Woolston
| Party | Candidate | Votes | % | ±% |
|---|---|---|---|---|
| Labour | J. Arnold | 1,820 | 54.1 | |
| Conservative | B. Deacon | 1,542 | 45.9 | |
| Majority | | 278 | 8.3 | |
| Turnout | | 3,362 | 35.0 | |
| Labour win (new seat) | | | | |

=== Test Valley ===
==== Andover North ====
Andover North
| Party | Candidate | Votes | % | ±% |
|---|---|---|---|---|
| Independent | M. Loveridge | Unopposed | | |
| Majority | | | | |
| Turnout | | | | |
| Independent win (new seat) | | | | |

==== Andover Rural ====
Andover Rural
| Party | Candidate | Votes | % | ±% |
|---|---|---|---|---|
| Independent | A. Murdoch | 1,810 | 50.5 | |
| Conservative | J. Morgan | 1,774 | 49.5 | |
| Majority | | 36 | 1.0 | |
| Turnout | | 3,584 | 31.6 | |
| Registered electors | | 11,317 | | |
| Independent win (new seat) | | | | |

==== Andover South ====
Andover South
| Party | Candidate | Votes | % | ±% |
|---|---|---|---|---|
| Conservative | G. Porter | Unopposed | | |
| Majority | | | | |
| Turnout | | | | |
| Conservative win (new seat) | | | | |

==== Baddesley ====
Baddesley
| Party | Candidate | Votes | % | ±% |
|---|---|---|---|---|
| Conservative | P. Merridale | 2,133 | 76.9 | |
| Labour | D. McQuail | 641 | 23.1 | |
| Majority | | 1,492 | 53.8 | |
| Turnout | | 2,774 | 34.1 | |
| Registered electors | | 8,138 | | |
| Conservative win (new seat) | | | | |

==== Romsey ====
Romsey
| Party | Candidate | Votes | % | ±% |
|---|---|---|---|---|
| Liberal | B. Palmer | 1,982 | 43.4 | |
| Conservative | H. Malpas | 1,748 | 38.2 | |
| Labour | P. Hammond | 454 | 9.9 | |
| Independent | V. Tregear | 388 | 8.5 | |
| Majority | | 234 | 5.1 | |
| Turnout | | 4,572 | 39.1 | |
| Registered electors | | 11,918 | | |
| Liberal win (new seat) | | | | |

==== Stockbridge ====
Stockbridge
| Party | Candidate | Votes | % | ±% |
|---|---|---|---|---|
| Conservative | C. Jones | Unopposed | | |
| Majority | | | | |
| Turnout | | | | |
| Conservative win (new seat) | | | | |

=== Winchester ===
==== Alresford ====
Alresford
| Party | Candidate | Votes | % | ±% |
|---|---|---|---|---|
| Conservative | A. Dowling | Unopposed | | |
| Majority | | | | |
| Turnout | | | | |
| Conservative win (new seat) | | | | |

==== Bishops Waltham & Droxford ====
Bishops Waltham & Droxford
| Party | Candidate | Votes | % | ±% |
|---|---|---|---|---|
| Conservative | T. Steele | Unopposed | | |
| Majority | | | | |
| Turnout | | | | |
| Conservative win (new seat) | | | | |

==== Hound ====
Winchester Rural No.2 (Hound)
| Party | Candidate | Votes | % | ±% |
|---|---|---|---|---|
| Conservative | A. Shotter | 1,940 | 54.4 | |
| Labour | G. Holmes | 1,629 | 45.6 | |
| Majority | | 345 | 6.8 | |
| Turnout | | 311 | 39.0 | |
| Conservative win (new seat) | | | | |

==== Micheldever ====
Micheldever
| Party | Candidate | Votes | % | ±% |
|---|---|---|---|---|
| Liberal | J. Matthew | 1,750 | 45.5 | |
| Conservative | A. Craig Harvey | 1,620 | 42.1 | |
| Labour | J. Danvers | 477 | 12.4 | |
| Majority | | 130 | 3.4 | |
| Turnout | | 3,847 | 41.0 | |
| Liberal win (new seat) | | | | |

==== St. Bartholomew, St. Johns & St. Michael ====
Winchester (St. Bartholomew, St. Johns & St. Michael)
| Party | Candidate | Votes | % | ±% |
|---|---|---|---|---|
| Conservative | J. Darling | 2,726 | 53.4 | |
| Labour | N. O'Neill | 2,381 | 46.6 | |
| Majority | | 345 | 6.8 | |
| Turnout | | 5,107 | 47.4 | |
| Conservative win (new seat) | | | | |

==== St Paul & St Thomas ====
Winchester (St. Paul & St. Thomas)
| Party | Candidate | Votes | % | ±% |
|---|---|---|---|---|
| Conservative | E. Cole | 2,271 | 42.7 | |
| Liberal | A. Mitchell | 2,194 | 41.2 | |
| Labour | P. Davies | 864 | 16.1 | |
| Majority | | 77 | 1.4 | |
| Turnout | | 5,319 | 47.7 | |
| Conservative win (new seat) | | | | |

==== Winchester Rural No. 4 ====
Winchester Rural 4
| Party | Candidate | Votes | % | ±% |
|---|---|---|---|---|
| Conservative | M. Robinson | 2,661 | 54.3 | |
| Labour | C. Watts | 2,240 | 45.7 | |
| Majority | | 421 | 8.6 | |
| Turnout | | 4,901 | 33.0 | |
| Conservative win (new seat) | | | | |

==== Winchester Rural No. 5 ====
Winchester Rural 5
| Party | Candidate | Votes | % | ±% |
|---|---|---|---|---|
| Conservative | D. Pumfrett | 1,433 | 60.8 | |
| Liberal | P. Stonham | 924 | 39.2 | |
| Majority | | 509 | 21.6 | |
| Turnout | | 2,357 | 34.0 | |
| Conservative win (new seat) | | | | |

==== Wickham ====
Wickham
| Party | Candidate | Votes | % | ±% |
|---|---|---|---|---|
| Conservative | R. Whitmore | Unopposed | | |
| Majority | | | | |
| Turnout | | | | |
| Conservative win (new seat) | | | | |
