= 1977 Hampshire County Council election =

United Kingdom local election

- 5 May 1977

All 97 seats to Hampshire County Council 49 seats needed for a majority
	First party	Second party	Third party
Party	Conservative	Labour	Independent
Seats before	55	26	8
Seats won	88	7	1
Seat change	▲33	▼19	▼7
Popular vote	253,611	86,760	5,971
Percentage	65.2	22.3	1.7
Swing	▲7.5	▼13.4	▼5.4
	Fourth party	Fifth party
Party	Ind. Conservative	Liberal
Seats before	0	6
Seats won	1	0
Seat change	▲1	▼6
Popular vote	5,064	31,120
Percentage	1.3	8.0
Swing	▲0.8	▼2.0
Council control before election
Freddie Emery-Wallis
Conservative
Council control after election
Freddie Emery-Wallis
Conservative

Elections to Hampshire County Council took place on 5 May 1977 as part of the 1977 United Kingdom local elections. All seats were up for election, with each ward returning either one or two councillors by first-past-the-post voting for a four-year term of office. These were the second to be held after the Local Government Act 1972, which reformed local councils and their boundaries.

== Summary ==
=== Election result ===
1977 Hampshire County Council election
Party	Candidates	Seats	Gains	Losses	Net gain/loss	Seats %	Votes %	Votes	+/−
Conservative	96	88	33	0	▲33	90.7	65.2	253,611	▲7.5
Labour	92	7	0	19	▼19	7.2	22.3	86,760	▼13.4
Liberal	56	0	0	6	▼6	0.0	8.0	31,120	▼2.0
Independent	8	1	0	7	▼7	1.0	1.7	6,507	▼5.4
Residents	6	0	0	0	Steady	0.0	1.5	5,971	▼0.2
Ind. Conservative	3	1	1	0	▲1	1.0	1.3	5,064	▲0.8
Communist	1	0	0	0	Steady	0.0	0.1	197	Steady

== Results by ward ==
=== Basingstoke and Deane ===
==== Basingstoke East ====
Basingstoke East
Party	Candidate	Votes	%	±%
Conservative	D. Keep*	3,307	68.2	−1.5
Labour	J. Eddie	1,016	20.9	−9.4
Liberal	C. Williams	527	10.9	new
Majority		2,780	47.2	▲7.9
Turnout		4,850	39.4	
Conservative hold		Swing		

==== Basingstoke North ====
Basingstoke North
Party	Candidate	Votes	%	±%
Labour	M. Corfin*	2,435	47.1	−2.8
Conservative	J. Dalton	2,022	39.1	+19.6
Liberal	P. Cook	715	13.8	−16.8
Majority		413	7.98	▼11.28
Turnout		5,172	38.4	−1.0
Labour hold		Swing		

==== Basingstoke West ====
Basingstoke West
Party	Candidate	Votes	%	±%
Conservative	A. Turner	3,978	56.7	+7.5
Labour	R. Donnelly*	2,292	32.7	−18.1
Liberal	K. Kiernan	741	10.6	new
Majority		1,686	24.04	
Turnout		7,011	37.8	
Conservative gain from Labour		Swing		

==== Candover ====
Candover
Party	Candidate	Votes	%	±%
Conservative	M. Boyne	2,723	88.0	▲88.0
Labour	H. Watson	370	12.0	new
Majority		2,353	76.1	
Turnout		3,093	45.0	
Conservative hold		Swing		

==== Kingsclere & Whitchurch No. 1 ====
Kingsclere & Whitchurch No. 1
Party	Candidate	Votes	%	±%
Conservative	D. Palmer	3,337	68.7	new
Liberal	J. Tompkinson	1,522	31.3	new
Majority		1,815	37.4	
Turnout		4,859	44.5	
Conservative gain from Independent		Swing		

==== Kingsclere & Whitchurch No. 2 ====
Kingsclere & Whitchurch No. 2
Party	Candidate	Votes	%	±%
Conservative	M. Walford	2,928	71.9	new
Labour	M. Marshall	770	18.9	▼10.2
Liberal	H. Ball	374	9.2	new
Majority		2,158	53.0	
Turnout		4,072	40.1	
Conservative gain from Independent		Swing		

==== Loddon ====
Loddon
Party	Candidate	Votes	%	±%
Conservative	J. Jack	Unopposed		
Majority				
Turnout				
Conservative hold		Swing		

=== East Hampshire ===
==== Alton ====
Alton
Party	Candidate	Votes	%	±%
Conservative	J. Bennett	3,035	67.4	▲6.0
Liberal	A. Jones	765	17.0	new
Labour	R O'Connor	702	15.6	▼23
Majority		2,270	44.3	▲21.41
Turnout		4,502	50.4	
Conservative hold		Swing		

==== Bramshott ====
Bramshott
Party	Candidate	Votes	%	±%
Conservative	J. Kirk	2,314	55.8	▲13.9
Independent	A. Jaffray*	1,526	36.8	▼6.0
Labour	W. Gardiner	309	7.4	▼7.9
Majority		788	19.0	▼18.13
Turnout		4,149	50.3	
Conservative gain from Independent		Swing		

==== Catherington ====
Catherington
Party	Candidate	Votes	%	±%
Conservative	L. White*	3,699	76.8	▲76.8
Liberal	B. Bulmer	630	13.1	new
Labour	T. King	486	10.1	new
Majority		3,069	63.7	
Turnout		4,815	43.0	
Conservative hold		Swing		

==== Headley ====
Headley
Party	Candidate	Votes	%	±%
Conservative	B. Blacker*	3,625	88.1	▲88.1
Labour	W. Card	488	11.9	new
Majority		3,069	63.7	
Turnout		4,815	43.0	
Conservative hold		Swing		

==== Medstead & Selborne ====
Medstead & Selborne
Party	Candidate	Votes	%	±%
Conservative	J. Scott*	3,112	76.4	▲76.4
Liberal	P. Ravenscroft	718	17.6	new
Labour	A. Boulter	245	6.0	new
Majority		2,394	58.7	
Turnout		4,075	58.7	
Conservative hold		Swing		

==== Petersfield ====
Petersfield
Party	Candidate	Votes	%	±%
Conservative	H. Rose*	3,264	62.3	▲14.9
Independent	R. Digby	747	14.3	▲1.1
Labour	P. Carpenter	544	10.4	▼7.8
Liberal	N. Davies	685	13.1	▼8.0
Majority		2,517	48.0	
Turnout		5,240	46.7	
Conservative hold		Swing		

=== Eastleigh ===
==== Eastleigh East ====
Eastleigh East
Party	Candidate	Votes	%	±%
Conservative	E. Greenwood	2,197	51.7	▲26.3
Labour	J. Davies*	1,791	42.1	▼6.8
Liberal	R. Rickard	263	6.2	▼19.5
Majority		406	9.6	
Turnout		4,251	44.4	▼5.3
Conservative gain from Labour		Swing		

==== Eastleigh North ====
Eastleigh North
Party	Candidate	Votes	%	±%
Conservative	M. Latham	5,253	64.8	▲21.1
Liberal	G. Smith	1,729	21.3	▼19.1
Labour	P. Lloyd	1,124	13.9	▼2.0
Majority		3,524	43.5	▲40.1
Turnout		8,106	43.5	
Conservative hold		Swing		

==== Eastleigh South ====
Eastleigh South
Party	Candidate	Votes	%	±%
Labour	S. Bartlet*	1,570	52.2	▼8.5
Conservative	W. Snooke	1,122	37.5	▲20.4
Liberal	D. Bradley	300	10.0	▼12.2
Majority		348	15.0	▼23.5
Turnout		2,992	37.2	▼6.8
Labour hold		Swing		

==== Hound ====
Hound was previously part of Winchester, but was transferred to Eastleigh

Hound
Party	Candidate	Votes	%	±%
Conservative	A Shotter-Masters*	2,759	65.3	▲10.9
Labour	A. Nisbet	1,000	23.7	▼21.9
Liberal	R. Stiles	469	11.1	new
Majority		3,524	43.5	▲40.1
Turnout		8,106	43.5	
Conservative hold		Swing		

=== Fareham ===
==== Fareham East ====
Fareham East
Party	Candidate	Votes	%	±%
Conservative	R. Cooper*	2,411	55.9	▼3.6
Labour	R. Price	1,663	38.5	▼2.0
Liberal	M. Phillips	241	5.6	new
Majority		748	17.3	▼1.8
Turnout		4,315	42.3	▲7.3
Conservative hold		Swing		

==== Fareham North East ====
Fareham North East
Party	Candidate	Votes	%	±%
Conservative	B. Gudgeon	2,011	40.0	▲40.0
Ind. Conservative	K. Jarvis*	1,830	36.4	new
Liberal	J. Brown	607	12.1	new
Labour	R. Stevens	574	11.4	new
Majority		181	3.6	
Turnout		5,022	36.0	
Conservative hold		Swing		

==== Fareham South West ====
Fareham South West
Party	Candidate	Votes	%	±%
Conservative	R. Allen*	2,511	57.1	▲57.1
Residents	R. Clements	1,025	23.3	new
Labour	F. Evans	607	12.0	new
Liberal	M. Lee	336	7.6	new
Majority		1,486	33.8	
Turnout		4,400	31.9	
Conservative hold		Swing		

==== Fareham Titchfield ====
Fareham Titchfield
Party	Candidate	Votes	%	±%
Conservative	J. Collett	2,607	72.1	▲72.1
Liberal	D. Burton-Jenkins	664	18.4	new
Labour	J. Christie	345	9.5	new
Majority		1,943	38.2	
Turnout		3,616	53.7	
Conservative hold		Swing		

==== Fareham West ====
Fareham West
Party	Candidate	Votes	%	±%
Conservative	E. Lunson	3,247	73.9	▲43.6
Liberal	L. Newbury	807	18.4	new
Labour	P. Coode	340	7.7	new
Majority		2,440	55.5	
Turnout		4,394	37.5	▼5.3
Conservative gain from Residents		Swing		

=== Gosport ===
==== Gosport Alverstoke ====
Fareham Alverstoke
Party	Candidate	Votes	%	±%
Conservative	A. Macdonald-Watson	3,933	76.7	▼1.3
Residents	D. De-La-Mare	801	15.6	new
Labour	A. Mason	391	7.6	▼14.4
Majority		3,132	61.1	▲5.0
Turnout		5,125	47.5	▲
Conservative hold		Swing		

==== Gosport Elson ====
Gosport Elson
Party	Candidate	Votes	%	±%
Conservative	R. Millard	4,242	65.7	▲21.2
Labour	J. Winter	2,219	34.3	▼21.2
Majority		2,023	31.3	
Turnout		6,461	40.2	▲10.9
Conservative gain from Labour		Swing		

==== Gosport Hardway ====
Gosport Hardway
Party	Candidate	Votes	%	±%
Conservative	A. Taylor	2,080	71.2	▲19.0
Labour	S. Leyland	842	28.8	▼19.0
Majority		1,238	42.4	▲37.9
Turnout		2922	43.3	▲12.7
Conservative hold		Swing		

==== Gosport Leesland ====
Gosport Leesland
Party	Candidate	Votes	%	±%
Conservative	J. Gillingham	2,305	68.8	▲30.4
Labour	A. Dyer	1,044	31.2	▼30.4
Majority		1,261	37.7	
Turnout		3,349	33.8	▲2.4
Conservative hold		Swing		

==== Gosport Town ====
Gosport Town
Party	Candidate	Votes	%	±%
Conservative	J. Rasmassen	1,655	52.4	▲8.3
Residents	L. Hare	904	28.6	new
Labour	S. Cully	601	19.0	▼36.9
Majority		751	23.8	
Turnout		3,160	48.7	▲36.9
Conservative gain from Labour		Swing		

=== Hart ===
==== Fleet ====
Fleet
Party	Candidate	Votes	%	±%
Conservative	F. Graham-Taylor*	5,323	85.7	▲85.7
Labour	G. Wolverson	887	14.3	new
Majority		4,436	71.4	
Turnout		6,210	35.0	
Conservative hold		Swing		

==== Hartley Wintney ====
Hartley Wintney
Party	Candidate	Votes	%	±%
Conservative	M. Hudson	2,405	88.7	▲88.7
Labour	I. Mackinnon	306	11.3	new
Majority		2,099	77.4	
Turnout		6,210	37.5	
Conservative hold		Swing		

==== Odiham ====
Odiham
Party	Candidate	Votes	%	±%
Conservative	J. Stancliffe	2,101	87.8	▲88.8
Labour	F. Jones	292	12.2	new
Majority		1,809	75.6	
Turnout		2393	40.6	
Conservative hold		Swing		

==== Yateley & Hawley ====
Yateley & Hawley
Party	Candidate	Votes	%	±%
Conservative	R. Yeomans*	3,858	79.3	▲17.5
Labour	M. Roberts	1,007	20.7	▼17.5
Majority		2,851	58.6	▲35.0
Turnout		4,865	29.2	▲16.8
Conservative hold		Swing		

=== Havant ===
==== Battins & Bondfield ====
Battins & Bondfield
Party	Candidate	Votes	%	±%
Conservative	G. Concannon	1,457	52.3	new
Labour	W. George*	992	35.6	▼21.9
Liberal	D. Butt	338	12.1	▼30.4
Majority		465	16.7	
Turnout		2,787	33.2	▼10.4
Conservative gain from Labour		Swing		

==== Bedhampton & Barncroft ====
Bedhampton & Barncroft
Party	Candidate	Votes	%	±%
Conservative	J. Evans	1,912	60.8	▲35.3
Labour	B. Smith	625	19.9	▼9.1
Liberal	F. Fyfe	333	10.6	▼10.0
Residents	J. Macadams	274	8.7	▲8.7
Majority		1,287	40.9	
Turnout		3,144	29.7	
Conservative gain from Liberal		Swing		

==== Hart Plain & Cowplain ====
Hart Plain & Cowplain
Party	Candidate	Votes	%	±%
Conservative	J. Hulme	2,656	48.4	▲27.5
Residents	J. Wigham*	2,462	44.9	▼9
Labour	M. Freestone	369	6.7	new
Majority		194	3.5	
Turnout		5,487	39.4	▼10.6
Conservative gain from Residents		Swing		

==== Havant & Warblington ====
Havant & Warblington
Party	Candidate	Votes	%	±%
Conservative	A. Reger*	4,407	80.5	▲22.4
Labour	A. Gleadall	551	10.1	new
Liberal	A. Nicole	515	9.4	▼32.5
Majority		3,856	70.5	▲54.3
Turnout		5,473	44.5	▲6.0
Conservative hold		Swing		

==== Hayling ====
Hayling
Party	Candidate	Votes	%	±%
Conservative	E. Dossetter	2,930	63.9	▲23.4
Independent	F. Martin*	1,418	30.9	▼21.3
Labour	I. Handscomb	237	5.2	▲2.2
Majority		1,512	33.0	
Turnout		4,585	45.5	
Conservative gain from Independent		Swing		

==== Purbrook & Waterloo ====
Purbrook & Waterloo
Party	Candidate	Votes	%	±%
Conservative	R. Beck	3,986	79.1	▲47.0
Labour	W. Wheeler	639	12.7	new
Liberal	A. Ramsay	416	8.3	new
Majority		3,347	66.4	
Turnout		5,041	35.5	
Conservative gain from Independent		Swing		

==== Stockheath & Leigh Park ====
Stockheath & Leigh Park
Party	Candidate	Votes	%	±%
Labour	A. Slight	770	48.9	▼5.3
Residents	D. Cole	505	32.1	new
Liberal	L. Hutchins	299	19.0	▼26.8
Majority		265	16.8	▲1.4
Turnout		1,574	18.0	▲2.61
Labour hold		Swing		

=== New Forest ===
==== Brockenhurst ====
Brockenhurst
Party	Candidate	Votes	%	±%
Conservative	C. Townsend-Rose*	2,128	83.8	▼2.4
Labour	S. Williams	411	16.2	▲2.4
Majority		2,539	67.6	▼4.8
Turnout		2,539	36.1	▲12.4
Conservative hold		Swing		

==== Fawley ====
Fawley
Party	Candidate	Votes	%	±%
Conservative	R. White	2,138	56.3	▼4.0
Liberal	D.Andrewartha	1,264	33.1	new
Labour	P. Jennings	396	10.4	▼26.8
Majority		874	23.0	▲18.4
Turnout		3,798	41.0	▲11.5
Conservative hold		Swing		

==== Hythe ====
Hythe
Party	Candidate	Votes	%	±%
Conservative	T. Thornber	3,221	61.8	▲28.3
Liberal	S. Wade	1,307	25.1	▼12.1
Labour	J. Candy	680	13.1	▼16.2
Majority		1,914	36.8	
Turnout		5,208	38.4	▲4.1
Conservative gain from Liberal Democrats		Swing		

==== Lymington Central ====
Lymington Central
Party	Candidate	Votes	%	±%
Conservative	A. Rice*	3,316	82.1	▲82.1
Liberal	F. Harrison	722	17.9	new
Majority		2,594	64.2	
Turnout		4,088	35.9	▲35.9
Conservative hold		Swing		

==== Lymington East ====
Lymington East
Party	Candidate	Votes	%	±%
Conservative	L. Hope Jones*	Unopposed		
Conservative hold		Swing		

==== Lymington West ====
Lymington West
Party	Candidate	Votes	%	±%
Conservative	R. Alderson*	3,282	84.9	▲84.9
Liberal	K. Huish	586	15.1	new
Majority		2,696	69.7	▲69.7
Turnout		3,868	38.0	▲38.0
Conservative hold		Swing		

==== Lyndhurst ====
Lyndhurst
Party	Candidate	Votes	%	±%
Conservative	G. Hodgson*	2,966	87.6	▲21.0
Labour	A. Hodgson	418	12.4	▲3.6
Majority		2,548	75.3	▲33.4
Turnout		3,384	36.2	▲10.5
Conservative hold		Swing		

==== Ringwood & Fordingbridge No. 1 ====
Ringwood & Fordingbridge No. 1
Party	Candidate	Votes	%	±%
Conservative	J. Holt*	2,738	87.5	▲7.4
Labour	M. Shutler	391	12.5	▲7.4
Majority		2,347	75.0	▲14.8
Turnout		3,129	40.4	▲6.0
Conservative hold		Swing		

==== Ringwood & Fordingbridge No. 2 ====
Ringwood & Fordingbridge No. 2
Party	Candidate	Votes	%	±%
Conservative	L. Errington	3,329	87.2	▲31.4
Labour	J. Cousins	490	12.8	▼8.8
Majority		2,839	74.3	▲41.1
Turnout		3,819	31.2	▲6.3
Conservative hold		Swing		

==== Totton ====
Totton
Party	Candidate	Votes	%	±%
Conservative	E. Randall	3,135	54.8	▲27.4
Liberal	J. Blackburn*	1,731	30.3	▼11.9
Labour	M. Bailey	853	14.9	▼15.5
Majority		1,404	24.5	
Turnout		5,719	36.2	▲4.3
Conservative gain from Liberal Democrats		Swing		

=== Portsmouth ===
==== Buckland ====
Buckland
Party	Candidate	Votes	%	±%
Conservative	R. Taylor	1,634	54.0	▲10.5
Labour	S. Rapson*	1,222	40.4	▼16.1
Liberal	D. Dransfield	169	5.6	new
Majority		412	13.6	
Turnout		3,025	43.2	▼2.9
Conservative gain from Labour		Swing		

==== Cosham ====
Cosham
Party	Candidate	Votes	%	±%
Independent	P. Ashley*	1,730	46.9	▼5.4
Conservative	J. Dartmouth	1,312	35.6	▲12.3
Labour	A. Golds	533	14.5	▼9.9
Liberal	A. Peaston	110	3.0	new
Majority		418	11.3	▼16.5
Turnout		3,685	38.9	
Independent hold		Swing		

==== Farlington ====
Farlington
Party	Candidate	Votes	%	±%
Conservative	S. Juniper	3,590	80.9	▲6.0
Labour	T. Wimbleton	845	19.1	▼6.0
Majority		2,745	61.9	▲12.2
Turnout		4,435	42.8	▲5.1
Conservative hold		Swing		

==== Fratton ====
Fratton
Party	Candidate	Votes	%	±%
Labour	Mike Hancock	1,487	54.3	▼9.2
Conservative	E. Snowdon	1,117	40.8	▲4.3
Liberal	R. Dodd	136	5.0	new
Majority		370	13.5	▼13.6
Turnout		2,740	39.3	▲4.2
Labour hold		Swing		

==== Havelock ====
Havelock
Party	Candidate	Votes	%	±%
Conservative	D. Taplin	2,154	59.9	▲13.2
Labour	H. Harris	1,118	31.1	▼22.2
Liberal	P. Yates	326	9.1	new
Majority		1,036	28.8	
Turnout		3,598	41.4	▼1.8
Conservative gain from Labour		Swing		

==== Highland ====
Highland
Party	Candidate	Votes	%	±%
Conservative	A. Elliott*	2,302	64.1	▲10
Labour	B. Bell	1,287	35.9	▼10.0
Majority		1,015	28.3	▲20.2
Turnout		3,589	36.5	▲2.2
Conservative hold		Swing		

==== Kingston ====
Kingston
Party	Candidate	Votes	%	±%
Conservative	F. Nicholson	2,489	54.7	▲4.7
Labour	I. Christie	1,753	38.6	▼11.4
Liberal	W. Ford	305	6.7	new
Majority		736	16.2	▲16.2
Turnout		4,547	43.9	▲6.5
Conservative gain from Labour		Swing		

==== Meredith ====
Meredith
Party	Candidate	Votes	%	±%
Conservative	A. Hill*	3,188	72.5	▲14.9
Labour	R. Ryan	1,211	27.5	▼14.9
Majority		1,977	44.9	▲29.7
Turnout		4,399	44.9	▲7.7
Conservative hold		Swing		

==== North End ====
North End
Party	Candidate	Votes	%	±%
Conservative	K. Hale*	2,127	62.1	▲15.2
Labour	B. Tyler	1,070	31.2	▼9.7
Liberal	D. Young	230	6.7	new
Majority		1,057	30.8	▲24.8
Turnout		3,427	38.0	▼5.8
Conservative hold		Swing		

==== Paulsgrove ====
Paulsgrove
Party	Candidate	Votes	%	±%
Labour	M. Prince*	1,643	50.6	▼3.2
Conservative	A. Biddulph-Pinchard	1,249	38.5	▲23.5
Liberal	I. Young	353	10.9	▼
Majority		394	12.1	▼10.5
Turnout		3,245	29.4	▲0.7
Labour hold		Swing		

==== Portsmouth No. 1 ====
Portsmouth No.1
Party	Candidate	Votes	%	±%
Labour	W. Stillwell	2,659	49.4	▼9.4
Labour	J. Wearn	2,447		
Conservative	P. Miller	2,345	43.6	▲2.4
Conservative	R. Glenn	2,337		
T&R	S. Sinclair	376	7.0	new
T&R	L. Fisher	367		
Majority		314	5.8	▼11.8
Turnout		5,380	59.1	▲22
Registered electors		10,555		
Labour hold		Swing		
Labour hold		Swing		

==== St. Jude ====
St. Jude
Party	Candidate	Votes	%	±%
Conservative	P. Loe*	1,714	73.5	▲1.2
Labour	C. Clark	367	15.7	▼12.0
Liberal	J. Wallis	250	10.7	new
Majority		1,347	57.8	▲13.2
Turnout		2,331	29.8	▲6.4
Conservative hold		Swing		

==== St. Simon ====
St. Simon
Party	Candidate	Votes	%	±%
Conservative	D. Connors*	2,072	70.4	▲0.3
Labour	J. Burton	529	18.0	▼11.9
Liberal	A. Bentley	342	11.6	new
Majority		1,543	52.4	▲12.2
Turnout		2,943	37.9	▲8.5
Conservative hold		Swing		

==== St. Thomas ====
St. Thomas
Party	Candidate	Votes	%	±%
Conservative	Freddie Emery-Wallis*	2,293	69.2	▲18
Labour	S. Thomas	1,020	30.8	▼18
Majority		1,273	38.4	▲36.0
Turnout		3,313	33.4	▼3.5
Conservative hold		Swing		

=== Rushmoor ===
==== Aldershot East ====
Aldershot East
Party	Candidate	Votes	%	±%
Conservative	J. King	2,048	51.4	▼4.7
Labour	J. White	1,371	34.4	▼9.5
Liberal	S. Coe	565	14.2	new
Majority		677	17.0	▲4.8
Turnout		3,984	34.3	▼0.2
Conservative hold		Swing		

==== Aldershot West ====
Aldershot West
Party	Candidate	Votes	%	±%
Conservative	C. Balchin	1,774	66.1	new
Liberal	R. Sharpe*	543	20.2	▼33.7
Labour	D. Simpson	368	13.7	▼32.4
Majority		1,231	45.8	▼17.9
Turnout		2,685	34.0	▼6.1
Conservative gain from Liberal		Swing		

==== Farnborough East ====
Farnborough East
Party	Candidate	Votes	%	±%
Conservative	G. Woolger	3,533	73.3	▼9.9
Labour	D. Somerville	781	16.2	▼11.9
Liberal	C. Rosell	508	10.5	new
Majority		2,752	57.1	▲21.8
Turnout		2,752	33.1	▲13.7
Conservative hold		Swing		

==== Farnborough West ====
Farnborough West
Party	Candidate	Votes	%	±%
Conservative	A. Bolt	3,014	54.1	▲4.2
Labour	H. Hewitt-Dutton*	1,753	31.5	▼18.6
Liberal	A. Thame	562	10.1	new
Independent	J. Grant	243	4.4	new
Majority		1,261	22.6	
Turnout		5,572	36.4	▲0.9
Conservative gain from Labour		Swing		

=== Southampton ===
==== Southampton No. 1 ====
Southampton No. 1
Party	Candidate	Votes	%	±%
Conservative	P. Lankford	1,981	51.1	▲7.1
Labour	R. Hill*	1,701	43.9	▼8.2
Communist	J. James	197	5.1	▲1.2
Majority		280	5.1	
Turnout		3879	29.3	▲2.3
Conservative gain from Labour		Swing		

==== Southampton No. 2 ====
Southampton No. 2
Party	Candidate	Votes	%	±%
Conservative	M. Andrews	1,860	62.2	▲18.8
Labour	I. Candy	1,019	34.1	▼10.9
Liberal	B. Fothcott	112	3.7	new
Majority		841	28.1	
Turnout		2991	36.6	▲1.6
Conservative gain from Labour		Swing		

==== Banister ====
Banister
Party	Candidate	Votes	%	±%
Conservative	E. Lewis*	1,710	73.2	▲12.4
Labour	A. Minto	415	17.8	Steady
Liberal	F. Tilling	211	9.0	▼12.5
Majority		1295	55.4	
Turnout		2336	35.8	▲6.8
Conservative hold		Swing		

==== Bassett ====
Bassett
Party	Candidate	Votes	%	±%
Conservative	N. Best*	3,234	79.1	▲10.1
Labour	M. Saunders	885	20.9	▼10.1
Majority		988	29.6	
Turnout		4119	40.4	▲4.0
Conservative hold		Swing		

==== Bitterne ====
Bitterne
Party	Candidate	Votes	%	±%
Conservative	B. Deacon	2,811	66.1	▲18.3
Labour	W. Couper	1,443	33.9	▼18.3
Majority		1368	32.2	
Turnout		4254	32.0	▲1.0
Conservative gain from Labour		Swing		

==== Coxford ====
Coxford
Party	Candidate	Votes	%	±%
Conservative	A. Samuels	3,182	56.5	▲18.5
Labour	R. McGuirk*	2,445	43.5	▼18.5
Majority		737	13.1	
Turnout		5627	36.2	▲4.0
Conservative gain from Labour		Swing		

==== Harefield ====
Harefield
Party	Candidate	Votes	%	±%
Conservative	J. Pitter*	2,653	68.6	▲15.4
Labour	E. Richardson	1,213	31.4	▼15.4
Majority		1440	37.2	
Turnout		3866	34.5	▲5.5
Conservative hold		Swing		

==== Millbrook ====
Millbrook
Party	Candidate	Votes	%	±%
Conservative	D. Freeston	2,016	60.3	▲10.8
Labour	M. Saunders	1,028	30.8	▼19.7
Liberal	P. Gurd	297	8.9	new
Majority		988	29.6	
Turnout		3341	40.0	▲4.0
Conservative gain from Labour		Swing		

==== Pear Tree & Bitterne ====
Pear Tree & Bitterne
Party	Candidate	Votes	%	±%
Conservative	S. Fitter	2,015	63.0	▲17.7
Labour	F. Billet	1,185	37.0	▼17.7
Majority		830	25.9	
Turnout		3200	39.2	▲4.2
Conservative gain from Labour		Swing		

==== Portswood ====
Portswood
Party	Candidate	Votes	%	±%
Conservative	J. Barr*	1,931	64.6	▲15.0
Labour	J. Denham	811	27.1	▲2.5
Liberal	M. Gausden	247	8.3	▼17.4
Majority		1120	37.5	
Turnout		2989	40.3	▲3.3
Conservative hold		Swing		

==== Redbridge ====
Redbridge
Party	Candidate	Votes	%	±%
Conservative	E. Bradbury	2,125	50.7	▲14.9
Labour	J. Pimlott*	2,068	49.3	▼14.9
Majority		57	1.4	
Turnout		4193	32.2	▲4.2
Conservative gain from Labour		Swing		

==== Shirley ====
Shirley
Party	Candidate	Votes	%	±%
Conservative	E. Ashcroft	2,689	77.7	▲9.8
Labour	G. Webb	770	22.3	▼9.8
Majority		1919	55.5	
Turnout		3559	45.6	▲7.6
Conservative hold		Swing		

==== Sholing ====
Millbrook
Party	Candidate	Votes	%	±%
Conservative	W. Hedges	2,450	59.9	▲24.6
Labour	D. Speake*	1,637	40.1	▼24.6
Majority		813	19.9	
Turnout		4087	33.5	▲5.5
Conservative gain from Labour		Swing		

==== St. Denys & Bitt ====
St. Denys & Bitt
Party	Candidate	Votes	%	±%
Conservative	D. Saunders*	1,822	70.6	▲13.1
Labour	A. Whitehead	759	29.4	▼13.1
Majority		1063	41.2	
Turnout		2581	41.2	▲4.2
Conservative hold		Swing		

==== Swaythling ====
Swaythling
Party	Candidate	Votes	%	±%
Conservative	P. Staples	1,920	65.4	▲20.5
Labour	R. Russel*	1,018	34.6	▼20.5
Majority		902	30.7	
Turnout		2938	32.2	▲5.2
Conservative gain from Labour		Swing		

==== Woolston ====
Woolston
Party	Candidate	Votes	%	±%
Conservative	G. Aplin	1,894	53.8	▲7.9
Labour	G. Ranger	1,433	40.7	▼13.4
Liberal	J. Rice	196	5.6	new
Majority		461	13.1	
Turnout		3423	37.4	▲2.4
Conservative gain from Labour		Swing		

=== Test Valley ===
==== Andover North ====
Andover North
Party	Candidate	Votes	%	±%
Ind. Conservative	F. Sumner	1,852	35.7	new
Conservative	T. Moloney	1,724	33.2	new
Labour	W. Allchin	1,254	24.2	new
Liberal	M. Smith	359	6.9	new
Majority		128	2.5	
Turnout		5189	44.5	
Ind. Conservative gain from Independent		Swing		

==== Andover Rural ====
Andover Rural
Party	Candidate	Votes	%	±%
Conservative	A. Murdoch*	3,797	74.4	▲
Liberal	N. Lewis	742	14.5	new
Labour	S. Stephenson	567	11.1	new
Majority		3055	59.8	
Turnout		5106	45	▲13.4
Conservative hold		Swing		

==== Andover South ====
Andover South
Party	Candidate	Votes	%	±%
Conservative	G. Porter*	2,429	70.7	▲70.7
Liberal	A. Croucher	576	16.8	new
Labour	G. Watkins	430	12.5	new
Majority		1853	53.9	
Turnout		3435	39.5	
Conservative hold		Swing		

==== Baddesley ====
Baddesley
Party	Candidate	Votes	%	±%
Conservative	P. Merridale*	3,046	77.2	▲0.3
Labour	B. Paget	467	11.8	▼11.3
Liberal	S. Freckleton	435	11.0	new
Majority		2579	65.3	
Turnout		3948	43.9	▲9.8
Conservative hold		Swing		

==== Romsey ====
Romsey
Party	Candidate	Votes	%	±%
Conservative	J. Rowsell	4,163	73.4	▲35.2
Liberal	B. Palmer*	1,148	20.3	▼23.1
Labour	P. Gardner	357	6.3	▼3.6
Majority		2085	53.2	
Turnout		5668	43.7	▲4.6
Conservative gain from Liberal		Swing		

==== Stockbridge ====
Stockbridge
Party	Candidate	Votes	%	±%
Conservative	C. Jones	2,077	79.4	▲79.4
Liberal	A. Bell	315	12.0	new
Labour	H. Osborne	223	8.5	new
Majority		1762	67.4	
Turnout		2615	42.7	
Conservative hold		Swing		

=== Winchester ===
==== Alresford ====
Party	Candidate	Votes	%	±%
Conservative	A. Dowling*	1,531	62.3	▲62.3
Labour	M. Ashby	746	30.4	new
Liberal	R. Hine	180	7.3	new
Majority		785	31.9	
Turnout		2457	45.8	
Conservative hold		Swing		

==== Bishops Waltahm & Droxford ====
Party	Candidate	Votes	%	±%
Conservative	T. Steele	3,481	85.5	▲85.5
Labour	C. Bigham	588	14.5	new
Majority		2893	71.1	
Turnout		4069	45.3	
Conservative hold		Swing		

==== Micheldever ====
Party	Candidate	Votes	%	±%
Conservative	R. Moffat	3,213	75.6	▲33.5
Liberal	A. Hicks	521	12.3	▼33.2
Labour	B. Williams	515	12.1	▼0.3
Majority		2692	63.4	
Turnout		4249	43.9	▲2.3
Conservative gain from Liberal		Swing		

==== St. Bartholomew, St. Johns & St. Michael ====
Party	Candidate	Votes	%	±%
Conservative	J. Darling*	3,083	62.1	▲8.7
Labour	J. Cloyne	1,499	30.2	▼16.4
Liberal	M. Costello	380	7.7	new
Majority		1584	31.9	
Turnout		4962	44.3	▼3.1
Conservative hold		Swing		

==== St Paul & St Thomas ====
Party	Candidate	Votes	%	±%
Conservative	E. Cole*	3,473	66.1	▲23.4
Liberal	C. Curtis	989	18.8	▼22.4
Labour	P. Davies	792	15.1	▼1.0
Majority		2484	47.3	
Turnout		5254	43.9	▼3.8
Conservative hold		Swing		

==== Winchester Rural No. 4 ====
Party	Candidate	Votes	%	±%
Conservative	M. Robinson*	4,804	75.1	▲20.8
Labour	D. Mckeone	1,088	17.0	▼28.7
Liberal	V. Hunt	509	8.0	new
Majority		3716	58.1	
Turnout		6401	38.7	▲5.7
Conservative hold		Swing		

==== Winchester Rural No. 5 ====
Party	Candidate	Votes	%	±%
Conservative	S. Russel	1,885	52.4	
Ind. Conservative	D. Pumfrett*	1,382	38.4	
Labour	M. Harling	330	9.2	new
Majority		503	14.0	
Turnout		3597	49.5	▲15.5
Conservative hold		Swing		

==== Wickham ====
Party	Candidate	Votes	%	±%
Conservative	R. Whitmore*	3,355	86.4	▲86.4
Labour	B. Townsend	528	13.6	new
Majority		2827	72.8	
Turnout		3883	36.8	
Conservative hold		Swing		
