= 2009 Hampshire County Council election =

2009 UK local government election

← 2005	4 June 2009	2013 →

All 78 seats to Hampshire County Council 40 seats needed for a majority
	First party	Second party
Party	Conservative	Liberal Democrats
Seats won	51	25
Seat change	▲5	▼3
- 2009 local election results in Hampshire
Council control before election
Conservative
Council control after election
Conservative

An election to Hampshire County Council took place on 4 June 2009 as part of the 2009 United Kingdom local elections, having been delayed from 7 May, to coincide with elections to the European Parliament. 78 councillors were elected from 75 electoral divisions, which returned either one or two county councillors each by first-past-the-post voting for a four-year term of office. The electoral divisions were the same as those used at the previous election in 2005. Elections in Portsmouth and Southampton do not coincide with this set, being unitary authorities outside the area covered by the County Council.

All locally registered electors (British, Irish, Commonwealth and European Union citizens) who were aged 18 or over on Thursday 2 May 2009 were entitled to vote in the local elections. Those who were temporarily away from their ordinary address (for example, away working, on holiday, in student accommodation or in hospital) were also entitled to vote in the local elections, although those who had moved abroad and registered as overseas electors cannot vote in the local elections. It is possible to register to vote at more than one address (such as a university student who had a term-time address and lives at home during holidays) at the discretion of the local Electoral Register Office, but it remains an offence to vote more than once in the same local government election.

== Summary ==
The election saw the Conservatives retain control of the council and increase their majority from 14 seats to 24 seats. As the largest opposition party, the Liberal Democrats lost seats overall, while Labour were reduced to holding just one seat (Basingstoke North). The Community Campaign in Hart also won a seat in Church Crookham and Ewshot.

== Results ==
Hampshire County Council election, 2009
Party	Seats	Gains	Losses	Net gain/loss	Seats %	Votes %	Votes	+/−
Conservative	51	7	2	+5	65.4	47.72	192900	+4.03
Liberal Democrats	25	2	5	-3	32.1	32.89	132975	-3.12
Labour	1	0	3	-3	1.3	7.07	28591	-10.25
CCH	1	1	0	+1	1.3	0.95	3822	N/A
UKIP	0	0	0	0	0	5.92	23949	+5.17
Independent	0	0	0	0	0	1.86	7504	+1.25
Green	0	0	0	0	0	1.72	6947	+0.28
English Democrat	0	0	0	0	0	1.04	4200	+0.97
No Party	0	0	0	0	0	0.49	2001	+0.38
BNP	0	0	0	0	0	0.34	1386	N/A

== Results by district ==
Hampshire County Council is split into 11 Districts, each district is further split into wards, the following are the results for these wards.

=== Basingstoke and Deane ===
Basingstoke and Deane

Basingstoke Central
Party	Candidate	Votes	%	±%
Liberal Democrats	Ronald Hussey	1912	43.10	+9.73
Conservative	Paul Miller	1300	29.31	+0.07
Labour	Sean Keating	970	21.87	−15.52
No Party	Michael Brooke	254	5.73	+5.73
Majority		612	13.79	
Turnout		4436	32.92	−28.10
Liberal Democrats gain from Labour		Swing	+12.62	

Basingstoke North
Party	Candidate	Votes	%	±%
Labour	Jane Frankum	1726	47.63	
Conservative	Christopher Aldous	1062	29.30	
Liberal Democrats	Janice Spalding	526	14.51	
No Party	Rebecca Butcher	310	8.55	
Majority		664	18.33	
Turnout		3624	28.35	−28.20
Labour hold		Swing		

Basingstoke North West
Party	Candidate	Votes	%	±%
Conservative	Stephen Reid	1745	55.19	
Labour	Andy McCormick	632	19.99	
Liberal Democrats	Michael Berwick-Gooding	475	15.02	
No Party	Christine Heath	310	9.80	
Majority		1113	35.20	
Turnout		3162	30.45	−27.15
Conservative hold		Swing		

Basingstoke South East
Party	Candidate	Votes	%	±%
Liberal Democrats	Brian Gurden	2454	59.74	
Conservative	Nalin Jayawardena	1265	30.79	
Labour	Mike Stockwell	389	9.47	
Majority		1189	28.95	
Turnout		4108	33.68	−27.17
Liberal Democrats hold		Swing		

Basingstoke South West
Party	Candidate	Votes	%	±%
Conservative	Rita Burgess	2900	61.90	
No Party	Philip Heath	745	15.90	
Liberal Democrats	Kevin Harkess	662	14.13	
Labour	Paul Frankum	378	8.07	
Majority		2155	46	
Turnout		4685	35.07	−32.69
Conservative hold		Swing		

Calleva and Kingsclere
Party	Candidate	Votes	%	±%
Conservative	Keith Chapman	3931	72.46	
Liberal Democrats	Roger Ward	1116	20.57	
Labour	Steve Rothman	378	6.97	
Majority		2815	51.89	
Turnout		5425	41.72	−29.43
Conservative hold		Swing		

Candovers
Party	Candidate	Votes	%	±%
Conservative	Anna McNair Scott	2709	54.15	
Independent	Ian Tilbury	1238	24.75	
Liberal Democrats	Jeff Teagle	798	15.95	
Labour	Susan Dady	258	5.16	
Majority		1471	29.4	
Turnout		5003	44.45	−27.9
Conservative hold		Swing		

Loddon
Party	Candidate	Votes	%	±%
Conservative	Elaine Still	3134	64.49	
Liberal Democrats	Stephen Day	1170	24.07	
Labour	Colin Regan	304	6.26	
No Party	Alex MacDonald	252	5.19	
Majority		1964	40.42	
Turnout		4860	37.3	−32.66
Conservative hold		Swing		

Tadley and Baughurst
Party	Candidate	Votes	%	±%
Conservative	Marilyn Tucker	2021	48.61	
Liberal Democrats	Warwick Lovegrove	1981	47.64	
Labour	Rick Dady	156	3.75	
Majority		40	0.97	
Turnout		4158	38.91	−25.76
Conservative hold		Swing		

Whitchurch and Clere
Party	Candidate	Votes	%	±%
Conservative	Tom Thacker	2696	55.46	
Liberal Democrats	Keith Watts	1527	31.41	
UKIP	George Garton	486	10.00	
Labour	Criss Connor	152	3.13	
Majority		1169	24.05	
Turnout		4861	46.25	−24.49
Conservative hold		Swing		

=== Eastleigh ===
Eastleigh

Bishopstoke and Fair Oak
Party	Candidate	Votes	%	±%
Liberal Democrats	Angela May Roling	2300	47.10	
Conservative	Chris Rhodes	1338	27.40	
UKIP	Hugh McGuinness	892	18.27	
Labour	Wendy Borrill	353	7.23	
Majority		962	19.7	
Turnout		4883	37.12	−30.97
Liberal Democrats hold		Swing		

Botley and Hedge End
Party	Candidate	Votes	%	±%
Liberal Democrats	Rupert Gregory Miles Kyrle	3001	48.08	
Conservative	Jerry Hall	2402	38.48	
UKIP	Beryl Alice Humphrey	670	10.73	
Labour	Geoffrey Kosted	169	2.71	
Majority		599	9.60	
Turnout		6242	43.73	−24.13
Liberal Democrats hold		Swing		

Chandlers Ford
Party	Candidate	Votes	%	±%
Conservative	Colin Davidovitz	2860	51.29	
Liberal Democrats	Terry Holden-Brown	1928	34.58	
UKIP	Paul Michael Webber	573	10.28	
Labour	Kevin Richard Butt	215	3.86	
Majority		932	16.71	
Turnout		5576	46.77	−26.81
Conservative hold		Swing		

Eastleigh East
Party	Candidate	Votes	%	±%
Liberal Democrats	Christopher Thomas	1887	45.40	
Conservative	Richard Uren	966	23.24	
UKIP	Caroline Bradbeer	829	19.95	
Labour	Peter Luffman	474	11.41	
Majority		921	22.16	
Turnout		4156	32.96	−30.49
Liberal Democrats hold		Swing		

Eastleigh West
Party	Candidate	Votes	%	±%
Liberal Democrats	Alan Broadhurst	2074	46.20	
Conservative	Judith Grajewski	1159	25.82	
UKIP	Ann Bays	740	16.48	
Labour	Sue Parkinson	516	11.49	
Majority		4489	32.26	
Turnout		4489	32.4	−31.13
Liberal Democrats hold		Swing		

Hamble
Party	Candidate	Votes	%	±%
Liberal Democrats	Keith House	2898	53.50	
Conservative	John Milne	1599	29.52	
UKIP	Mark Collins	733	13.53	
Labour	Ted White	187	3.45	
Majority		5417	38.29	
Turnout		5417	38.5	−26.18
Liberal Democrats hold		Swing		

West End and Hedge End Grange Park
Party	Candidate	Votes	%	±%
Liberal Democrats	Bruce Tennent	2423	52.40	
Conservative	Martin Briggs	1438	31.10	
UKIP	Martin Lyon	550	11.89	
Labour	Nancy Smith	213	4.61	
Majority		985	21.30	
Turnout		4624	34.37	−32.09
Liberal Democrats hold		Swing		

=== East Hampshire ===
East Hampshire

Alton Rural
Party	Candidate	Votes	%	±%
Conservative	Mark Kemp-Gee	4031	70.04	
Liberal Democrats	Jacky Powers	1464	25.44	
Labour	Jan Treacher	260	4.52	
Majority		2567	44.6	
Turnout		5755	43.37	−31.06
Conservative hold		Swing		

Alton Town
Party	Candidate	Votes	%	±%
Conservative	Andrew Joy	2191	47.38	
Liberal Democrats	Tony Ludlow	2107	45.57	
Labour	Barbara Burfoot	326	7.05	
Majority		84	1.81	
Turnout		4624	35.00	−29.28
Conservative gain from Liberal Democrats		Swing		

Bordon, Whitehill and Lindford
Party	Candidate	Votes	%	±%
Liberal Democrats	Adam Carew	2111	64.81	
Conservative	Yvonne Parker-Smith	1038	31.87	
Labour	Melanie Onn	108	3.32	
Majority		1073	32.94	
Turnout		3257	27.77	−26.78
Liberal Democrats hold		Swing		

Catherington
Party	Candidate	Votes	%	±%
Liberal Democrats	Sam Payne	2375	46.32	
Conservative	Dave Harvey	2015	39.30	
English Democrat	Pat Harris	335	6.53	
Independent	Eunice Byrom	285	5.56	
Labour	Kenneth Monks	117	2.28	
Majority		360	7.02	
Turnout		5127	41.52	−26.51
Liberal Democrats gain from Conservative		Swing		

Headley
Party	Candidate	Votes	%	±%
Conservative	Sam James	2849	63.65	
Liberal Democrats	Richard Clifford	1393	31.12	
Labour	John Tough	234	5.23	
Majority		1456	32.53	
Turnout		4476	35.29	−30.95
Conservative hold		Swing		

Petersfield Butser
Party	Candidate	Votes	%	±%
Conservative	John West	2800	55.16	
Liberal Democrats	Judith Rodgers	1946	38.34	
Labour	Bill Organ	330	6.50	
Majority		854	16.82	
Turnout		5076	39.09	−27.57
Conservative gain from Liberal Democrats		Swing		

Petersfield Hangers
Party	Candidate	Votes	%	±%
Conservative	Clarke Vaughan	3340	68.32	
Liberal Democrats	Roger Mullenger	1314	26.88	
Labour	Wendy Godber	235	4.81	
Majority		2026	41.44	
Turnout		4889	41.49	−29.43
Conservative hold		Swing		

=== Fareham ===
Fareham

Fareham Crofton
Party	Candidate	Votes	%	±%
Conservative	Tim Knight	3151	58.47	+7.31
Liberal Democrats	Craig Lewis	1317	24.44	−8.98
UKIP	Frederick Estall	438	8.13	+8.13
Green	John Vivian	309	5.73	+5.73
Labour	Cameron Crouchman	174	3.23	−12.19
Majority		1834	34.03	
Turnout		5389	46.36	−25.04
Conservative hold		Swing		

Fareham Portchester
Party	Candidate	Votes	%	±%
Liberal Democrats	Roger Price	2841	47.41	
Conservative	Nick Gregory	1673	27.92	
Labour	Richard Ryan	364	6.07	
BNP	Roger Knight	311	5.19	
English Democrat	Alan Chapman	202	3.37	
Majority		1168	19.49	
Turnout		5992	41.28	−26.65
Liberal Democrats hold		Swing		

Fareham Sarisbury
Party	Candidate	Votes	%	±%
Conservative	Sean Woodward	2661	64.14	
Liberal Democrats	Martin Haysom	533	12.85	
UKIP	Vivienne Young	476	11.47	
Green	Iain Maclennan	279	6.72	
Labour	Brenda Caines	200	4.82	
Majority		2128	51.29	
Turnout		4149	37.06	−29.96
Conservative hold		Swing		

Fareham Titchfield
Party	Candidate	Votes	%	±%
Conservative	Geoff Hockley	2037	45.83	
Liberal Democrats	Jack Englefield	1451	32.64	
UKIP	Geoff Townley	530	11.92	
Green	Peter Doggett	247	5.56	
Labour	Michael Prior	180	4.05	
Majority		586	13.19	
Turnout		4445	40.39	−26.3
Conservative hold		Swing		

Fareham Town (2)
Party	Candidate	Votes	%	±%
Conservative	John Bryant	5092	24.93	
Conservative	Raymond Ellis	4451	21.80	
Liberal Democrats	Katrina Trott	2819	13.80	
Liberal Democrats	Jim Murray	2695	13.20	
UKIP	Steve Richards	1665	8.15	
UKIP	Graeme Young	1392	6.82	
Green	David Harrison	1062	5.20	
Labour	Les Ricketts	631	3.09	
Labour	Stuart Rose	615	3.01	
Turnout		11020	39.74	−25.43
Conservative hold		Swing		
Conservative hold		Swing		

Fareham Warsash
Party	Candidate	Votes	%	±%
Conservative	Keith Evans	2767	60.48	+5.11
UKIP	John Claydon	680	14.86	+14.86
Liberal Democrats	David Savage	545	11.91	−9.78
Green	Linda Maclennan	338	7.39	+7.39
Labour	James Carr	245	5.36	−12.28
Majority		2087	45.62	
Turnout		4575	41.06	−28.64
Conservative hold		Swing		

=== Gosport ===
Gosport

Bridgemary
Party	Candidate	Votes	%	±%
Conservative	Michael Geddes	1449	36.94	
Labour	Dennis Wright	1254	31.97	
English Democrat	Bob Shaw	689	17.56	
Liberal Democrats	Cyril Simpson	305	7.77	
Green	Jane Staffieri	226	5.76	
Majority		195	4.97	
Turnout		3923	31.71	−26.6
Conservative gain from Labour		Swing		

Hardway
Party	Candidate	Votes	%	±%
Liberal Democrats	Peter Chegwyn	1668	49.23	
Conservative	Mark Hook	1328	39.20	
Labour	Stephen Williams	392	11.57	
Majority		340	10.03	
Turnout		3388	30.37	−27.79
Liberal Democrats gain from The Liberal Democrat Local Resident				

Lee
Party	Candidate	Votes	%	±%
Conservative	Margaret Snaith	2620	65.86	
Liberal Democrats	Paul Keeley	1026	25.79	
Labour	Peter Bell	332	8.35	
Majority		1594	40.07	
Turnout		3978	29.68	−26.54
Conservative hold		Swing		

Leesland and Town (2)
Party	Candidate	Votes	%	±%
Conservative	Peter Edgar	4502	28.89	
Conservative	Christopher Carter	3882	24.91	
Liberal Democrats	Keith Gill	1566	10.05	
Liberal Democrats	George Morby	1193	7.66	
Independent	Brian Hart	1085	6.96	
Green	Terry Mitchell	981	6.30	
English Democrat	Fungus Addams	972	6.24	
Labour	Graham Giles	781	5.01	
Labour	Jock Train	619	3.97	
Turnout		8439	34.55	−27.29
Conservative hold		Swing		
Conservative gain from Liberal Democrats		Swing		

=== Hart ===
Hart

Church Crookham and Ewshot
Party	Candidate	Votes	%	±%
CCH	Jenny Radley	3822	66.54	
Conservative	Pritpal Singh	1744	30.88	
Labour	Jim White	148	2.58	
Majority		2048	35.66	
Turnout		5744	44.66	−21.96
CCH gain from Conservative		Swing		

Fleet
Party	Candidate	Votes	%	±%
Conservative	Sharyn Wheale	3624	61.16	
Independent	Denis Gotel	1964	33.15	
Labour	John Davies	337	5.69	
Majority		1660	28.01	
Turnout		5925	39.36	−27.11
Conservative hold		Swing		

Hartley Wintney, Eversley and Yateley West
Party	Candidate	Votes	%	±%
Liberal Democrats	David Simpson	2361	42.18	
Conservative	Sara Kinnell	2288	40.88	
Independent	Roger Robertson	599	9.99	
BNP	Geoffrey Crompton	222	3.97	
Labour	Joyce Still	167	2.98	
Majority		73	1.30	
Turnout		5597	41.74	−23.59
Liberal Democrats hold		Swing		

Odiham
Party	Candidate	Votes	%	±%
Conservative	Jonathan Glen	3458	68.03	
Liberal Democrats	Graham Cockarill	1029	20.24	
BNP	Jerry Owen	324	6.37	
Labour	Sean Clarke	272	5.35	
Majority		2429	47.79	
Turnout		5083	39.12	−28.23
Conservative hold		Swing		

Yateley East, Blackwater and Ancells
Party	Candidate	Votes	%	±%
Liberal Democrats	Adrian Collett	3015	62.64	
Conservative	Edward Dawson	1615	33.55	
Labour	Barry Jones	183	3.80	
Majority		1400	29.09	
Turnout		4813	35.97	−28.82
Liberal Democrats hold		Swing		

=== Havant ===
Havant

Bedhampton and Leigh Park (2)
Party	Candidate	Votes	%	±%
Liberal Democrats	Ann Buckley	2531	18.28	
Conservative	Liz Fairhurst	2363	17.06	
Conservative	Ken Smith	2322	16.77	
Liberal Democrats	Susan Stocker	1791	12.93	
UKIP	Ray Finch	1414	10.21	
Labour	Richard Brown	1106	7.99	
Labour	Jim Phillips	884	6.38	
English Democrat	George Herbert	779	5.63	
Green	Tim Dawes	658	4.75	
Turnout		74.15	28.55	−25.95
Liberal Democrats hold		Swing		
Conservative gain from Labour		Swing		

Cowplain and Hart Plain
Party	Candidate	Votes	%	±%
Conservative	David Keast	2105	53.41	
Liberal Democrats	Mike Ashton	1048	26.59	
Green	Dave Ludlam	521	13.22	
Labour	Howard Linsley	267	6.77	
Majority		1057	26.82	
Turnout		3941	33.24	−27.83
Conservative hold		Swing		

Emsworth and St Faith's
Party	Candidate	Votes	%	±%
Conservative	Ray Bolton	3144	46.66	
Liberal Democrats	Ray Cobbett	1648	24.46	
UKIP	Stephen Harris	807	11.98	
Green	Mary Youle	546	8.10	
Labour	John Ogden	406	6.03	
English Democrat	Grant Greenham	187	2.78	
Majority		1496	22.20	
Turnout		6738	45.14	−25.43
Conservative hold		Swing		

Hayling Island
Party	Candidate	Votes	%	±%
Conservative	Frank Pearce	2579	47.05	
UKIP	Gary Kerrin	1108	20.22	
Liberal Democrats	Paul Pritchard	700	12.77	
Labour	Sheila Mealy	443	8.08	
Green	Gill Leek	436	7.95	
English Democrat	Christopher Pritchard	215	3.92	
Majority		1471	26.83	
Turnout		5481	38.84	−25.33
Conservative hold		Swing		

Purbrook and Stakes South
Party	Candidate	Votes	%	±%
Conservative	Robin McIntosh	1901	51.18	
English Democrat	Alan Green	821	22.11	
Liberal Democrats	Steve Marshall	558	15.02	
Labour	Barry Steel	434	11.69	
Majority		1080	29.07	
Turnout		3714	30.47	−30.17
Conservative hold		Swing		

Waterloo and Stakes North
Party	Candidate	Votes	%	±%
Conservative	Ian Beagley	2667	61.85	
Liberal Democrats	Fred Dunford	1298	30.10	
Labour	Howard Sherlock	347	8.05	
Majority		1369	31.75	
Turnout		4312	33.36	−30.52
Conservative hold		Swing		

=== New Forest ===
New Forest

Brockenhurst
Party	Candidate	Votes	%	±%
Conservative	Ken Thornber	2899	58.32	
Liberal Democrats	Rachel Smith	1235	24.84	
UKIP	Michael Biddiscombe	654	13.16	
Labour	Stephen Short	183	3.68	
Majority		1664	33.48	
Turnout		4971	43.16	−24.67
Conservative hold		Swing		

Dibden and Hythe
Party	Candidate	Votes	%	±%
Liberal Democrats	Brian Dash	3664	62.55	
Conservative	Bob Wappet	1991	33.99	
Labour	Gwyneth Hubert	203	3.47	
Majority		1673	28.56	
Turnout		5858	39.62	−28.06
Liberal Democrats hold		Swing		

Fordingbridge
Party	Candidate	Votes	%	±%
Conservative	Edward Heron	2686	54.91	
Liberal Democrats	Miranda Whitehead	1989	40.66	
Labour	Brian Shemmings	217	4.44	
Majority		697	14.25	
Turnout		4892	42.69	−27.04
Conservative hold		Swing		

Lymington
Party	Candidate	Votes	%	±%
Conservative	Adrian Evans	2954	62.65	
Liberal Democrats	Paul Hickman	1565	33.19	
Labour	Peter Coakes	196	4.16	
Majority		1389	29.46	
Turnout		4715	38.60	−25.03
Conservative hold		Swing		

Lyndhurst
Party	Candidate	Votes	%	±%
Conservative	Keith Mans	3220	63.62	
Liberal Democrats	Jim Parry	1503	29.70	
Labour	Ken Kershaw	338	6.68	
Majority		1717	33.92	
Turnout		5061	40.47	−29.66
Conservative hold		Swing		

Milford and Hordle
Party	Candidate	Votes	%	±%
Conservative	Alan Rice	3258	58.32	
Liberal Democrats	Wynford Davies	1077	19.28	
UKIP	Celia Pilling	997	17.85	
Labour	Amy Coakes	254	4.55	
Majority		2181	39.04	
Turnout		5586	41.33	−23.58
Conservative hold		Swing		

New Milton
Party	Candidate	Votes	%	±%
Conservative	Mel Kendal	2865	51.62	
UKIP	Nigel Cox	1326	23.89	
Independent	John Evans	1000	18.02	
Labour	Peter Dance	359	6.47	
Majority		1539	27.73	
Turnout		5550	40.17	−26.57
Conservative hold		Swing		

Ringwood
Party	Candidate	Votes	%	±%
Conservative	Steve Rippon-Swaine	2513	60.35	
Liberal Democrats	Mark Radford	1341	32.20	
Labour	Peter Harper	310	7.44	
Majority		1172	28.15	
Turnout		4164	35.55	−27.52
Conservative hold		Swing		

South Waterside
Party	Candidate	Votes	%	±%
Conservative	Alexis McEvoy	2005	49.80	
Liberal Democrats	Gordon Richardson	1741	43.24	
Labour	Mike Perkins	280	6.95	
Majority		264	6.56	
Turnout		4026	31.85	−28.25
Conservative gain from Liberal Democrats		Swing		

Totton North
Party	Candidate	Votes	%	±%
Liberal Democrats	Alan Weeks	2042	48.56	
Conservative	Chris Lagdon	1927	45.83	
Labour	Peter Sopowski	236	5.61	
Majority		115	2.73	
Turnout		4205	32.51	−29.62
Liberal Democrats hold		Swing		

Totton South and Marchwood
Party	Candidate	Votes	%	±%
Liberal Democrats	David Harrison	2641	54.92	
Conservative	David Russell	1897	39.45	
Labour	Alun Barnett	271	5.64	
Majority		744	15.47	
Turnout		4809	33.88	−29.19
Liberal Democrats hold		Swing		

=== Rushmoor ===
Rushmoor

Aldershot East
Party	Candidate	Votes	%	±%
Conservative	Eric Neal	1419	35.91	
Labour	Mike Roberts	1088	27.54	
Independent	Peter Sandy	700	17.72	
Liberal Democrats	Paul Bowers	614	15.54	
No Party	Roger Watkins	130	3.29	
Majority		331	8.37	
Turnout		3951	29.75	−27.37
Conservative hold		Swing		

Aldershot West
Party	Candidate	Votes	%	±%
Conservative	Roger James Kimber	1811	55.93	
Liberal Democrats	Shaun Murphy	757	23.38	
Labour	Alex Crawford	670	20.69	
Majority		1054	32.55	
Turnout		3238	28.16	−24.78
Conservative hold		Swing		

Farnborough North
Party	Candidate	Votes	%	±%
Conservative	Roz Muschamp	1451	34.41	
Liberal Democrats	Charlie Fraser-Fleming	1295	30.71	
Independent	Jon Paul Weston	673	15.96	
BNP	Warren Glass	529	12.54	
Labour	Jonathan Slater	269	6.38	
Majority		156	3.70	
Turnout		4217	34.42	−21.51
Conservative hold		Swing		

Farnborough South
Party	Candidate	Votes	%	±%
Conservative	John Wall	2715	55.13	
Liberal Democrats	Craig Card	1866	37.89	
Labour	Bill Tootill	344	6.98	
Majority		849	17.24	
Turnout		4925	37.97	−26.72
Conservative hold		Swing		

Farnborough West
Party	Candidate	Votes	%	±%
Conservative	Carol Leversha	2707	57.45	
Liberal Democrats	Sue Gadsby	1658	35.19	
Labour	Clive Grattan	347	7.36	
Majority		1049	22.26	
Turnout		4712	34.82	−30.17
Conservative hold		Swing		

=== Test Valley ===
Test Valley

Andover North
Party	Candidate	Votes	%	±%
Conservative	Pam Mutton	1809	42.73	
Liberal Democrats	Robin Hughes	1360	32.12	
UKIP	Timothy Rolt	794	18.75	
Labour	Alan Cotter	271	6.40	
Majority		449	10.61	
Turnout		4234	31.81	−22.01
Conservative gain from Liberal Democrats		Swing		

Andover South
Party	Candidate	Votes	%	±%
Conservative	David Kirk	2102	49.09	
Liberal Democrats	Vincent McGarry	961	22.44	
UKIP	Bill McCabe	916	21.39	
Labour	John Newland	303	7.08	
Majority		1141	26.65	
Turnout		4282	35.73	−28.14
Conservative hold		Swing		

Andover West
Party	Candidate	Votes	%	±%
Conservative	Pat West	3178	62.24	
UKIP	Janis Sadler	905	17.72	
Liberal Democrats	Josie Msonthi	700	13.71	
Labour	Dick Wan	323	6.33	
Majority		2273	44.52	
Turnout		5106	39.09	−25.00
Conservative hold		Swing		

Baddesley
Party	Candidate	Votes	%	±%
Liberal Democrats	Alan Dowden	3555	60.43	
Conservative	James Jaggers	2132	36.24	
Labour	Amanda Ford	196	3.33	
Majority		1423	24.19	
Turnout		5883	44.56	−27.69
Liberal Democrats hold		Swing		

Romsey Extra
Party	Candidate	Votes	%	±%
Conservative	Roy Perry	3054	58.44	
Liberal Democrats	Kath Tilling	1986	38.00	
Labour	David Stevens	186	3.56	
Majority		1068	20.44	
Turnout		5226	43.90	−26.27
Conservative hold		Swing		

Romsey Town
Party	Candidate	Votes	%	±%
Liberal Democrats	Mark Cooper	3140	55.24	
Conservative	Ian Richards	2364	41.59	
Labour	David Moran	180	3.17	
Majority		776	13.65	
Turnout		5684	47.66	−23.01
Liberal Democrats hold		Swing		

Test Valley Central
Party	Candidate	Votes	%	±%
Conservative	Andrew Gibson	4063	60.61	
Liberal Democrats	Richard Rowles	1705	25.43	
UKIP	Stan Oram	702	10.47	
Labour	Paul Doran	234	3.49	
Majority		2358	35.18	
Turnout		6704	46.43	−25.71
Conservative hold		Swing		

=== Winchester ===
Winchester

Bishops Waltham
Party	Candidate	Votes	%	±%
Liberal Democrats	Peter Mason	2870	46.22	
Conservative	Laurence Ruffell	2357	37.96	
UKIP	Colin Mason	542	8.73	
Green	Jim Kirkpatrick	311	5.01	
Labour	Patricia Hayward	129	2.08	
Majority		513	8.26	
Turnout		6209	49.49	−24.71
Liberal Democrats hold		Swing		

Itchen Valley
Party	Candidate	Votes	%	±%
Liberal Democrats	Jackie Porter	3701	53.59	
Conservative	George Beckett	2524	36.55	
UKIP	David Samuel	344	4.98	
Green	Alison Craig	234	3.39	
Labour	Robin Atkins	103	1.49	
Majority		1177	17.04	
Turnout		6906	55.23	−20.61
Liberal Democrats hold		Swing		

Meon Valley
Party	Candidate	Votes	%	±%
Conservative	Felicity Hindson	3502	61.49	
Liberal Democrats	Sheila Campbell	1454	25.53	
UKIP	John Clark	586	10.29	
Labour	David Picton-Jones	153	2.69	
Majority		2048	35.96	
Turnout		5695	50.05	−26.91
Conservative hold		Swing		

Winchester Downlands
Party	Candidate	Votes	%	±%
Liberal Democrats	Charlotte Bailey	3791	55.85	
Conservative	Marc Cumberlege	2488	36.65	
UKIP	Christopher Barton-Briddon	390	5.75	
Labour	Antony De Peyer	119	1.75	
Majority		1303	19.20	
Turnout		6788	54.18	−22.15
Liberal Democrats hold		Swing		

Winchester Eastgate
Party	Candidate	Votes	%	±%
Liberal Democrats	Brian Collin	2651	42.56	
Conservative	Ian Tait	2313	37.13	
Labour	Chris Pines	510	8.19	
Green	Rupert Pitt	426	6.84	
UKIP	Lawrence Hole	329	5.28	
Majority		338	5.43	
Turnout		6229	43.77	−23.00
Liberal Democrats hold		Swing		

Winchester Southern Parishes
Party	Candidate	Votes	%	±%
Conservative	Frederick Allgood	2625	57.65	
Liberal Democrats	Kairen Goves	1232	27.06	
UKIP	Ian Norgate	557	12.23	
Labour	Clive Coldwell	139	3.05	
Majority		1393	30.59	
Turnout		4553	39.22	−29.78
Conservative hold		Swing		

Winchester Westgate
Party	Candidate	Votes	%	±%
Liberal Democrats	Phryn Dickens	3101	52.16	
Conservative	Roger Davey	1829	30.77	
Green	Dave Walker-Nix	373	6.27	
UKIP	Douglas Reed	323	5.43	
Labour	Patrick Davies	319	5.37	
Majority		1272	21.39	
Turnout		5945	43.65	−26.66
Liberal Democrats hold		Swing		
