= Freddie Emery-Wallis =

British politician

Frederick Alfred John Emery-Wallis FSA (11 May 1927 – March 2017) was a British Conservative Party county councillor for Hampshire from 1973 to 2001, Lord Mayor of Portsmouth for 1968–69, Leader of Hampshire County Council 1976–1993 and 1997–99, Chairman of the Council 1999–2001, and Deputy Lord Lieutenant for Hampshire. He was a considerable champion of the county's heritage, and in particular of the Hampshire Record Office.

Emery-Wallis suffered a "spectacular fall from grace" in 2001 after being convicted and jailed for 9 months for two counts of indecent assault against two boys dating back to the 1960s and 1970s. He was released after 4½ months.

As a consequence, he was stripped of his CBE to which he had been appointed in the 1999 Birthday Honours, and of his Deputy Lieutenancy. Further allegations of indecent assault against a girl were dropped in 2008 due to lack of evidence.

He died after suffering a stroke in March 2017.
