= 2005 Hampshire County Council election =

2005 UK local government election

- 5 May 2005

All 78 seats to Hampshire County Council 40 seats needed for a majority
| | First party | Second party | Third party |
|---|---|---|---|
| Party | Conservative | Liberal Democrats | Labour |
| Seats won | 46 | 28 | 4 |
- Map showing the results of the 2005 Hampshire County Council election.
Council control before election
Conservative
Council control after election
Conservative

An election to Hampshire County Council took place on 5 May 2005 as part of the 2005 United Kingdom local elections. 78 councillors were elected from 75 electoral divisions, which returned either one or two county councillors each by first-past-the-post voting for a four-year term of office. The electoral divisions were changed from the previous election, but continued to be used for 2009. Elections in Portsmouth and Southampton did not coincide with this election, as they are unitary authorities, and therefore outside the area covered by the County Council.

== Summary ==
The election saw the Conservatives remain in control, with 46 seats, giving a majority of six. The Liberal Democrats were the next biggest party, with 28 seats, followed by the Labour Party with four seats.

== Results ==
The table below only tallies the votes of the highest polling candidate for each party within each ward. This is known as the top candidate method and is often used for multi-member plurality elections. Candidates standing as "Liberal Democrat Local Resident" or "Labour Local Resident" banners are counted under the Liberal Democrats and Labour Parties respectively, and those standing as unaffiliated are counted as Independent.

Hampshire County Council election, 2005
| Party | Seats | Gains | Losses | Net gain/loss | Seats % | Votes % | Votes | +/− |
|---|---|---|---|---|---|---|---|---|
| Conservative | 46 | | | | 58.97 | 43.90 | 275,009 | |
| Liberal Democrats | 28 | | | | 35.89 | 36.19 | 226,772 | |
| Labour | 4 | | | | 5.12 | 16.75 | 104,942 | |
| Green | 0 | | | | 0.00 | 1.52 | 9,563 | |
| UKIP | 0 | | | | 0.00 | 0.78 | 4,943 | |
| Independent | 0 | | | | 0.00 | 0.76 | 4,811 | |
| English Democrat | 0 | | | | 0.00 | 0.07 | 453 | |

== Results by District ==
=== Basingstoke and Deane ===
Basingstoke and Deane

Basingstoke Central
| Party | Candidate | Votes | % | ±% |
|---|---|---|---|---|
| Labour | Josephine Kelly | 2,855 | 37 | |
| Liberal Democrats | John Shaw | 2548 | 33 | |
| Conservative | Ronald Collins | 2233 | 29 | |
| Labour win (new seat) | | | | |

Basingstoke North
| Party | Candidate | Votes | % | ±% |
|---|---|---|---|---|
| Labour | Jane Frankum | 3,120 | 48 | |
| Liberal Democrats | Ronald Hussey | 1709 | 26 | |
| Conservative | Christine Heath | 1622 | 25 | |
| Labour win (new seat) | | | | |

Basingstoke North West
| Party | Candidate | Votes | % | ±% |
|---|---|---|---|---|
| Conservative | Stephen Reid | 2,298 | 44 | |
| Labour | Stephen Wyeth | 2002 | 38 | |
| Liberal Democrats | Obi Nwasike | 917 | 18 | |
| Conservative win (new seat) | | | | |

Basingstoke South East
| Party | Candidate | Votes | % | ±% |
|---|---|---|---|---|
| Liberal Democrats | Brian Gurden | 2,729 | 38 | |
| Conservative | Dan Putty | 2131 | 30 | |
| Labour | Andrew McCormick | 2006 | 28 | |
| UKIP | David Watson | 341 | 5 | |
| Liberal Democrats win (new seat) | | | | |

Basingstoke South West
| Party | Candidate | Votes | % | ±% |
|---|---|---|---|---|
| Conservative | Philip Heath | 4,499 | 52 | |
| Labour | Paul Frankum | 1970 | 23 | |
| Liberal Democrats | Sheila Lock | 1770 | 21 | |
| Green | Darren Shirley | 345 | 4 | |
| Conservative win (new seat) | | | | |

Calleva and Kingsclere
| Party | Candidate | Votes | % | ±% |
|---|---|---|---|---|
| Conservative | Keith Chapman | 5,372 | 59 | |
| Liberal Democrats | Roger Ward | 2123 | 23 | |
| Labour | Terence Price | 1588 | 17 | |
| Conservative win (new seat) | | | | |

Candovers
| Party | Candidate | Votes | % | ±% |
|---|---|---|---|---|
| Conservative | Anna McNair-Scott | 4,180 | 52 | |
| Liberal Democrats | John Burbidge-King | 2502 | 31 | |
| Labour | David Cavanagh | 1357 | 17 | |
| Conservative win (new seat) | | | | |

Loddon
| Party | Candidate | Votes | % | ±% |
|---|---|---|---|---|
| Conservative | Elaine Still | 4,273 | 53 | |
| Liberal Democrats | Alan Read | 2502 | 31 | |
| Labour | Eileen Cavanagh | 1309 | 16 | |
| Conservative win (new seat) | | | | |

Tadley & Baughurst
| Party | Candidate | Votes | % | ±% |
|---|---|---|---|---|
| Conservative | Marilyn Tucker | 2,786 | 41 | |
| Liberal Democrats | Josephine Slimin | 2633 | 39 | |
| Labour | Stephen Rothman | 1093 | 16 | |
| Green | Andrew White | 318 | 5 | |
| Conservative win (new seat) | | | | |

Whitchurch & Clere
| Party | Candidate | Votes | % | ±% |
|---|---|---|---|---|
| Conservative | John Maxwell | 3,438 | 47 | |
| Liberal Democrats | John Wall | 3121 | 43 | |
| Labour | James Gibb | 688 | 9 | |
| Conservative win (new seat) | | | | |

=== Eastleigh ===
Eastleigh

Bishopstoke & Fair Oak
| Party | Candidate | Votes | % | ±% |
|---|---|---|---|---|
| Liberal Democrats | Angela Roling | 4,029 | 46 | |
| Conservative | Christopher Rhodes | 2629 | 30 | |
| Labour | Gwendoline Borrill | 1707 | 19 | |
| UKIP | George McGuinness | 445 | 5 | |
| Liberal Democrats win (new seat) | | | | |

Botley & Hedge End
| Party | Candidate | Votes | % | ±% |
|---|---|---|---|---|
| Liberal Democrats | Derek Blampied | 4,188 | 45 | |
| Conservative | Jeremy Hall | 3468 | 37 | |
| Labour | Geoffrey Kosted | 1276 | 14 | |
| UKIP | Michale O'Donoghue | 477 | 5 | |
| Liberal Democrats win (new seat) | | | | |

Chandler's Ford
| Party | Candidate | Votes | % | ±% |
|---|---|---|---|---|
| Conservative | Colin Davidovitz | 3,951 | 45 | |
| Liberal Democrats | Pamela Holden-Brown | 3592 | 41 | |
| UKIP | Paul Webber | 844 | 10 | |
| Labour | Kevin Butt | 329 | 4 | |
| Conservative win (new seat) | | | | |

Eastleigh East
| Party | Candidate | Votes | % | ±% |
|---|---|---|---|---|
| Liberal Democrats | Glynn Davies-Dear | 3,579 | 47 | |
| Labour | Susan Toher | 1853 | 24 | |
| Conservative | Thomas Harvey | 1759 | 23 | |
| UKIP | Stephen Challis | 389 | 5 | |
| Independent | Alan Sneddon | 80 | 1 | |
| Liberal Democrats win (new seat) | | | | |

Eastleigh West
| Party | Candidate | Votes | % | ±% |
|---|---|---|---|---|
| Liberal Democrats | Alan Broadhurst | 3,497 | 43 | |
| Labour | Peter Luffman | 2311 | 28 | |
| Conservative | Stephen Gosling | 1926 | 24 | |
| UKIP | Samuel Snook | 389 | 5 | |
| Liberal Democrats win (new seat) | | | | |

Hamble
| Party | Candidate | Votes | % | ±% |
|---|---|---|---|---|
| Liberal Democrats | Keith House | 4,276 | 49 | |
| Conservative | John Milne | 3215 | 37 | |
| Labour | Edward White | 1315 | 15 | |
| Liberal Democrats win (new seat) | | | | |

West End & Hedge End Grange Park
| Party | Candidate | Votes | % | ±% |
|---|---|---|---|---|
| Liberal Democrats | Carol Boulton | 3,705 | 45 | |
| Conservative | Colin Murphy | 3042 | 37 | |
| Labour | Nancy Smith | 1257 | 15 | |
| UKIP | Peter Stewart | 278 | 3 | |
| Liberal Democrats win (new seat) | | | | |

=== East Hampshire ===
East Hampshire

Alton Rural
| Party | Candidate | Votes | % | ±% |
|---|---|---|---|---|
| Conservative | Mark Kemp-Gee | 5,064 | 52 | |
| Liberal Democrats | Linda Harmer-Jones | 3671 | 38 | |
| Labour | Janice Treacher | 972 | 10 | |
| Conservative win (new seat) | | | | |

Alton Town
| Party | Candidate | Votes | % | ±% |
|---|---|---|---|---|
| Liberal Democrats | Anthony Ludlow | 4,294 | 51 | |
| Conservative | Caroline Dibden | 2832 | 33 | |
| Labour | Barbara Burfoot | 1337 | 16 | |
| Liberal Democrats win (new seat) | | | | |

Bordon, Whitehill & Lindford
| Party | Candidate | Votes | % | ±% |
|---|---|---|---|---|
| Liberal Democrats | Adam Carew | 2,824 | 47 | |
| Conservative | Guy Stacpoole | 2075 | 35 | |
| Labour | John Tough | 1107 | 18 | |
| Liberal Democrats win (new seat) | | | | |

Catherington
| Party | Candidate | Votes | % | ±% |
|---|---|---|---|---|
| Conservative | Eunice Byrom | 3,680 | 45 | |
| Liberal Democrats | James (Mike) Ashton | 3647 | 44 | |
| Labour | Peter Treacher | 932 | 11 | |
| Conservative win (new seat) | | | | |

Headley
| Party | Candidate | Votes | % | ±% |
|---|---|---|---|---|
| Conservative | Simon James | 4,845 | 58 | |
| Liberal Democrats | Richard Clifford | 2380 | 28 | |
| Labour | Mark Walsh | 1138 | 14 | |
| Conservative win (new seat) | | | | |

Petersfield Butser
| Party | Candidate | Votes | % | ±% |
|---|---|---|---|---|
| Liberal Democrats | Samantha Payne | 3,733 | 43 | |
| Conservative | David Fleming | 3670 | 43 | |
| Labour | William Organ | 1180 | 14 | |
| Liberal Democrats win (new seat) | | | | |

Petersfield Hangers
| Party | Candidate | Votes | % | ±% |
|---|---|---|---|---|
| Conservative | Michael Cartwright | 4,410 | 51 | |
| Liberal Democrats | Elizabeth Mullenger | 3036 | 38 | |
| Labour | Moira Johnson | 920 | 11 | |
| Conservative win (new seat) | | | | |

=== Fareham ===
Fareham

Fareham Crofton
| Party | Candidate | Votes | % | ±% |
|---|---|---|---|---|
| Conservative | Timothy Knight | 4,208 | 51 | |
| Liberal Democrats | James Forrest | 2749 | 33 | |
| Labour | Ian Christie | 1268 | 15 | |
| Conservative win (new seat) | | | | |

Fareham Portchester
| Party | Candidate | Votes | % | ±% |
|---|---|---|---|---|
| Liberal Democrats | Roger Price | 4,451 | 46 | |
| Conservative | Nicholas Walker | 3298 | 34 | |
| Labour | Richard Ryan | 2014 | 21 | |
| Liberal Democrats win (new seat) | | | | |

Fareham Sarisbury
| Party | Candidate | Votes | % | ±% |
|---|---|---|---|---|
| Conservative | Seán Woodward | 4,200 | 61 | |
| Liberal Democrats | Mark Christie | 1396 | 20 | |
| Labour | Clive Coldwell | 1245 | 18 | |
| Conservative win (new seat) | | | | |

Fareham Titchfield
| Party | Candidate | Votes | % | ±% |
|---|---|---|---|---|
| Conservative | Geoffrey Hockley | 3,489 | 49 | |
| Liberal Democrats | Jonathan Englefield | 2219 | 31 | |
| Labour | Leslie Ricketts | 1219 | 17 | |
| Green | Julie Blenkharn | 214 | 3 | |
| Conservative win (new seat) | | | | |

Fareham Town
| Party | Candidate | Votes | % | ±% |
|---|---|---|---|---|
| Conservative | John Bryant | 7,585 | 24 | |
| Conservative | Raymond Ellis | 6,722 | 21 | |
| Liberal Democrats | Eric Dunn | 4900 | 16 | |
| Liberal Democrats | Donald (Jim) Murray | 4685 | 15 | |
| Labour | Angela Carr | 3546 | 11 | |
| Labour | Stuart Rose | 2682 | 9 | |
| Green | David Harrison | 1289 | 4 | |
| Conservative win (new seat) | | | | |
| Conservative win (new seat) | | | | |

Fareham Warsash
| Party | Candidate | Votes | % | ±% |
|---|---|---|---|---|
| Conservative | Keith Evans | 4,121 | 55 | |
| Liberal Democrats | David Savage | 1614 | 22 | |
| Labour | Nicholas Knight | 1313 | 18 | |
| Green | Lois Tarbet | 394 | 5 | |
| Conservative win (new seat) | | | | |

=== Gosport ===
Gosport

Bridgemary
| Party | Candidate | Votes | % | ±% |
|---|---|---|---|---|
| Labour | Dennis Wright | 3,459 | 47 | |
| Conservative | Stephen Ward | 2360 | 32 | |
| Liberal Democrats | Wayne Richards | 1466 | 20 | |
| Labour win (new seat) | | | | |

Hardway
| Party | Candidate | Votes | % | ±% |
|---|---|---|---|---|
| Liberal Democrats | Peter Chegwyn | 2,184 | 35 | |
| Conservative | Peter Langdon | 2014 | 32 | |
| Labour | Kenneth Searle | 1730 | 27 | |
| Green | Noelle Bradshaw | 367 | 6 | |
| Liberal Democrats win (new seat) | | | | |

Lee
| Party | Candidate | Votes | % | ±% |
|---|---|---|---|---|
| Conservative | Margaret Snaith | 3,458 | 52 | |
| Labour | Victor Burt | 1798 | 27 | |
| Liberal Democrats | Mark Mudie | 1456 | 22 | |
| Conservative win (new seat) | | | | |

Leesland and Town (2)
| Party | Candidate | Votes | % | ±% |
|---|---|---|---|---|
| Conservative | Peter Edgar | 5,575 | 21 | |
| Liberal Democrats | Keith Gill | 4,769 | 18 | |
| Conservative | Michael Geddes | 4430 | 17 | |
| Liberal Democrats | David Smith | 3987 | 15 | |
| Labour | Diane Searle | 3311 | 13 | |
| Green | Terry Mitchell | 1001 | 4 | |
| Conservative win (new seat) | | | | |
| Liberal Democrats win (new seat) | | | | |
| Turnout | | | | |

=== Hart ===
Hart

Church Crookham & Ewshot
| Party | Candidate | Votes | % | ±% |
|---|---|---|---|---|
| Conservative | Peter Hutcheson | 4,482 | 53 | |
| Liberal Democrats | David Neighbour | 2889 | 34 | |
| Labour | James White | 1116 | 13 | |
| Conservative win (new seat) | | | | |

Fleet
| Party | Candidate | Votes | % | ±% |
|---|---|---|---|---|
| Conservative | Sharyn Wheale | 3,460 | 39 | |
| Independent | Denis Gotel | 2116 | 24 | |
| Liberal Democrats | Rodney Fisher | 2101 | 24 | |
| Labour | Laura Jones | 857 | 10 | |
| Green | Maria Keith | 838 | 4 | |
| Conservative win (new seat) | | | | |

Hartley Wintney, Eversley & Yateley West
| Party | Candidate | Votes | % | ±% |
|---|---|---|---|---|
| Liberal Democrats | David Simpson | 4,042 | 46 | |
| Conservative | Stephen Parker | 3408 | 39 | |
| Independent | Katherine Parish | 1297 | 15 | |
| Liberal Democrats win (new seat) | | | | |

Odiham
| Party | Candidate | Votes | % | ±% |
|---|---|---|---|---|
| Conservative | Jonathan Glen | 4,837 | 58 | |
| Liberal Democrats | Vivien Street | 1797 | 22 | |
| Labour | John Davies | 1029 | 13 | |
| Green | Lars Mosesson | 577 | 7 | |
| Conservative win (new seat) | | | | |

Yateley East, Blackwater & Ancells
| Party | Candidate | Votes | % | ±% |
|---|---|---|---|---|
| Liberal Democrats | Adrian Collett | 4,649 | 55 | |
| Conservative | Vivienne Gascoigne | 2686 | 32 | |
| Labour | David Jenkins | 869 | 10 | |
| UKIP | John Howe | 302 | 4 | |
| Liberal Democrats win (new seat) | | | | |

=== Havant ===
Havant

Bedhampton & Leigh Park
| Party | Candidate | Votes | % | ±% |
|---|---|---|---|---|
| Liberal Democrats | Ann Buckley | 4,607 | 19 | |
| Labour Co-op | Anne Edwards | 4,497 | 18 | |
| Labour Co-op | Virginia Steel | 3646 | 15 | |
| Liberal Democrats | Stephen Marshall | 3583 | 15 | |
| Conservative | Yvonne Weeks | 3441 | 14 | |
| Conservative | Jennifer Wride | 3380 | 14 | |
| UKIP | Andrew Little | 753 | 3 | |
| Green | Karen Griffiths | 730 | 3 | |
| Liberal Democrats win (new seat) | | | | |
| Labour win (new seat) | | | | |

Cowplain & Hart Plain
| Party | Candidate | Votes | % | ±% |
|---|---|---|---|---|
| Conservative | John West | 2,742 | 39 | |
| Liberal Democrats | Ray Cobbett | 2329 | 33 | |
| Labour | Kenneth Monks | 1541 | 22 | |
| Green | Ann Gleed | 371 | 5 | |
| Conservative win (new seat) | | | | |

Emsworth & St Faith's
| Party | Candidate | Votes | % | ±% |
|---|---|---|---|---|
| Conservative | David Gillett | 5,191 | 51 | |
| Liberal Democrats | Flora (Faith) Posonby | 2571 | 25 | |
| Labour | William Gilchrist | 1770 | 17 | |
| Green | Tim Dawes | 711 | 7 | |
| Conservative win (new seat) | | | | |

Hayling Island
| Party | Candidate | Votes | % | ±% |
|---|---|---|---|---|
| Conservative | Edward Gale | 4,726 | 53 | |
| Labour | Sheila Mealy | 2016 | 23 | |
| Liberal Democrats | Janis Shawashi | 1495 | 17 | |
| Green | Gillian Leek | 639 | 7 | |
| Conservative win (new seat) | | | | |

Purbrook & Stakes South
| Party | Candidate | Votes | % | ±% |
|---|---|---|---|---|
| Conservative | Robin McIntosh | 3,132 | 43 | |
| Labour | Nicola Potts | 2204 | 30 | |
| Liberal Democrats | Christine Pylee | 1417 | 20 | |
| Green | Wendy Smith | 478 | 7 | |
| Conservative win (new seat) | | | | |

Waterloo & Stakes North
| Party | Candidate | Votes | % | ±% |
|---|---|---|---|---|
| Conservative | Ian Beagley | 3,812 | 48 | |
| Liberal Democrats | John Jacobs | 2097 | 26 | |
| Labour | Carl Roberts | 1634 | 20 | |
| Green | Jacqueline Turner | 443 | 6 | |
| Conservative win (new seat) | | | | |

=== New Forest ===
New Forest

Brockenhurst
| Party | Candidate | Votes | % | ±% |
|---|---|---|---|---|
| Conservative | Thomas (Ken) Thornber | 5,039 | 67 | |
| Liberal Democrats | Christopher Harrison | 2511 | 33 | |
| Conservative win (new seat) | | | | |

Dibden & Hythe
| Party | Candidate | Votes | % | ±% |
|---|---|---|---|---|
| Liberal Democrats | Brian Dash | 6,061 | 62 | |
| Conservative | Frank Vickers | 3736 | 38 | |
| Liberal Democrats win (new seat) | | | | |

Fordingbridge
| Party | Candidate | Votes | % | ±% |
|---|---|---|---|---|
| Conservative | Katherine Heron | 3,922 | 50 | |
| Liberal Democrats | Robert Hale | 3242 | 41 | |
| Labour | Audrey Walker | 676 | 9 | |
| Conservative win (new seat) | | | | |

Lymington
| Party | Candidate | Votes | % | ±% |
|---|---|---|---|---|
| Conservative | Adrian Evans | 4,204 | 56 | |
| Liberal Democrats | Martina Humber | 2330 | 31 | |
| Labour | Stephen Short | 917 | 12 | |
| Conservative win (new seat) | | | | |

Lyndhurst
| Party | Candidate | Votes | % | ±% |
|---|---|---|---|---|
| Conservative | Mel Kendal | 4,931 | 57 | |
| Liberal Democrats | Leonard Harris | 2701 | 31 | |
| Labour | Kenneth Kershaw | 1066 | 12 | |
| Conservative win (new seat) | | | | |

Milford & Hordle
| Party | Candidate | Votes | % | ±% |
|---|---|---|---|---|
| Conservative | Alan Rice | 5,349 | 63 | |
| Liberal Democrats | Wynford Davies | 3170 | 37 | |
| Conservative win (new seat) | | | | |

New Milton
| Party | Candidate | Votes | % | ±% |
|---|---|---|---|---|
| Conservative | Patricia Banks | 4,837 | 54 | |
| Liberal Democrats | Margaret Newlands | 2001 | 22 | |
| Labour | Peter Dance | 1364 | 15 | |
| UKIP | Martin Field | 725 | 8 | |
| Conservative win (new seat) | | | | |

Ringwood
| Party | Candidate | Votes | % | ±% |
|---|---|---|---|---|
| Conservative | Nigel Clarke | 3,725 | 52 | |
| Liberal Democrats | Miranda Whitehead | 2052 | 28 | |
| Labour | Peter Harper | 1452 | 20 | |
| Conservative win (new seat) | | | | |

South Waterside
| Party | Candidate | Votes | % | ±% |
|---|---|---|---|---|
| Liberal Democrats | Lee Dunsdon | 4,601 | 61 | |
| Conservative | Alexis McEvoy | 2903 | 39 | |
| Liberal Democrats win (new seat) | | | | |

Totton North
| Party | Candidate | Votes | % | ±% |
|---|---|---|---|---|
| Liberal Democrats | Alan Weeks | 3,210 | 41 | |
| Conservative | Frank Bright | 3096 | 40 | |
| Labour | Peter Sopowski | 1522 | 19 | |
| Liberal Democrats win (new seat) | | | | |

Totton South & Marchwood
| Party | Candidate | Votes | % | ±% |
|---|---|---|---|---|
| Liberal Democrats | David Harrison | 3,145 | 37 | |
| Conservative | Sharon (Ronnie) Belfitt | 3975 | 35 | |
| Labour | Alan Goodfellow | 1628 | 19 | |
| Independent | Edith Randall | 748 | 9 | |
| Liberal Democrats win (new seat) | | | | |

=== Rushmoor ===
Rushmoor

Aldershot East
| Party | Candidate | Votes | % | ±% |
|---|---|---|---|---|
| Conservative | Eric Neal | 2,439 | 37 | |
| Labour | Michael Roberts | 2276 | 34 | |
| Liberal Democrats | Ian Colpus | 1944 | 29 | |
| Conservative win (new seat) | | | | |

Aldershot West
| Party | Candidate | Votes | % | ±% |
|---|---|---|---|---|
| Conservative | Roger Kimber | 2,448 | 44 | |
| Liberal Democrats | Philip Thompson | 1445 | 26 | |
| Labour | Peter Rust | 1343 | 24 | |
| Green | Julia Fowler | 351 | 6 | |
| Conservative win (new seat) | | | | |

Farnborough North
| Party | Candidate | Votes | % | ±% |
|---|---|---|---|---|
| Conservative | Roderick Baulk | 2,465 | 37 | |
| Liberal Democrats | Charles Fraser-Fleming | 2222 | 33 | |
| Labour | June Smith | 1423 | 21 | |
| Independent | Jon Weston | 570 | 9 | |
| Conservative win (new seat) | | | | |

Farnborough South
| Party | Candidate | Votes | % | ±% |
|---|---|---|---|---|
| Conservative | Patricia Devereux | 4,067 | 51 | |
| Liberal Democrats | Linda Neal | 2667 | 33 | |
| Labour | Barry Jones | 1296 | 16 | |
| Conservative win (new seat) | | | | |

Farnborough West
| Party | Candidate | Votes | % | ±% |
|---|---|---|---|---|
| Conservative | Carol Leversha | 3,390 | 42 | |
| Liberal Democrats | Craig Card | 2927 | 36 | |
| Labour | Clive Grattan | 1390 | 17 | |
| English Democrat | Gary Cowd | 453 | 6 | |
| Conservative win (new seat) | | | | |

=== Test Valley ===
Test Valley

Andover North
| Party | Candidate | Votes | % | ±% |
|---|---|---|---|---|
| Liberal Democrats | Robin Hughes | 2,732 | 38 | |
| Conservative | Kenneth Whitehouse | 2708 | 38 | |
| Labour | Michael Mumford | 1669 | 23 | |
| Liberal Democrats win (new seat) | | | | |

Andover South
| Party | Candidate | Votes | % | ±% |
|---|---|---|---|---|
| Conservative | David Kirk | 3,344 | 45 | |
| Liberal Democrats | Rodney Bailey | 1899 | 26 | |
| Labour | Paul Goddard | 1528 | 21 | |
| Green | James Todd | 638 | 9 | |
| Conservative win (new seat) | | | | |

Andover West
| Party | Candidate | Votes | % | ±% |
|---|---|---|---|---|
| Conservative | Pat West | 4,492 | 55 | |
| Liberal Democrats | Peter Wilson | 2045 | 25 | |
| Labour | Alan Cotter | 1672 | 20 | |
| Conservative win (new seat) | | | | |

Baddesley
| Party | Candidate | Votes | % | ±% |
|---|---|---|---|---|
| Liberal Democrats | Alan Dowden | 5,056 | 56 | |
| Conservative | Robin Oliver | 3138 | 35 | |
| Labour | Beryl Addison | 772 | 9 | |
| Liberal Democrats win (new seat) | | | | |

Romsey Extra
| Party | Candidate | Votes | % | ±% |
|---|---|---|---|---|
| Conservative | Roy Perry | 4,431 | 53 | |
| Liberal Democrats | Dorothy Baverstock | 3014 | 36 | |
| Labour | Amanda Ford | 871 | 10 | |
| Conservative win (new seat) | | | | |

Romsey Town
| Party | Candidate | Votes | % | ±% |
|---|---|---|---|---|
| Liberal Democrats | Mark Cooper | 4,052 | 49 | |
| Conservative | John Ray | 3582 | 43 | |
| Labour | David Moran | 684 | 10 | |
| Liberal Democrats win (new seat) | | | | |

Test Valley Central
| Party | Candidate | Votes | % | ±% |
|---|---|---|---|---|
| Conservative | Michael Woodhall | 6,077 | 59 | |
| Liberal Democrats | Alistair Anderson | 3118 | 30 | |
| Labour | Albert Edwards | 1037 | 10 | |
| Conservative win (new seat) | | | | |

=== Winchester ===
Winchester

Bishops Waltham
| Party | Candidate | Votes | % | ±% |
|---|---|---|---|---|
| Liberal Democrats | Peter Mason | 4,579 | 51 | |
| Conservative | Peter Ellerton | 3568 | 40 | |
| Labour | Stephen Haines | 857 | 10 | |
| Liberal Democrats win (new seat) | | | | |

Itchen Valley
| Party | Candidate | Votes | % | ±% |
|---|---|---|---|---|
| Liberal Democrats | Jackie Porter | 4,055 | 45 | |
| Conservative | Barry Lipscomb | 3999 | 44 | |
| Labour | Elaine Fullaway | 665 | 7 | |
| Green | Elizabeth (Alison) Craig | 369 | 4 | |
| Liberal Democrats win (new seat) | | | | |

Meon Valley
| Party | Candidate | Votes | % | ±% |
|---|---|---|---|---|
| Conservative | Felicity Hindson | 4,499 | 53 | |
| Liberal Democrats | Christopher Day | 3349 | 39 | |
| Labour | Timothy Curran | 657 | 8 | |
| Conservative win (new seat) | | | | |

Winchester Downlands
| Party | Candidate | Votes | % | ±% |
|---|---|---|---|---|
| Liberal Democrats | Charlotte Bailey | 4,593 | 49 | |
| Conservative | Susan Evershed | 4173 | 44 | |
| Labour Co-op | Antony De Peyer | 614 | 7 | |
| Liberal Democrats win (new seat) | | | | |

Winchester Eastgate
| Party | Candidate | Votes | % | ±% |
|---|---|---|---|---|
| Liberal Democrats | Pamela Peskett | 4,244 | 47 | |
| Conservative | Flick Drummond | 3110 | 35 | |
| Labour | Chris Pines | 1596 | 18 | |
| Liberal Democrats win (new seat) | | | | |

Winchester Southern Parishes
| Party | Candidate | Votes | % | ±% |
|---|---|---|---|---|
| Conservative | Frederick Allgood | 3,981 | 52 | |
| Liberal Democrats | Stephen Nicholls | 2795 | 37 | |
| Labour | Patrichia Hayward | 825 | 11 | |
| Conservative win (new seat) | | | | |

Winchester Westgate
| Party | Candidate | Votes | % | ±% |
|---|---|---|---|---|
| Liberal Democrats | Phrynette Dickens | 4,426 | 49 | |
| Conservative | Ian Tait | 3116 | 34 | |
| Labour | Patrick Davies | 1496 | 17 | |
| Liberal Democrats win (new seat) | | | | |
