= 2016 Winchester City Council election =

2016 UK local government election

← 2015	5 May 2016	2018 →

45 of the 45 seats to Winchester City Council 23 seats needed for a majority
- Turnout: 43.41%
	First party	Second party
Party	Conservative	Liberal Democrats
Seats won	25	20
Popular vote	16,917	14,252
Percentage	40.6%	34.2%
- Map of the City of Winchester after the election
Council control before election
Conservative
Council control after election
Conservative

The 2016 Winchester City Council election took place on 5 May 2016 to elect members of Winchester City Council in England. This was on the same day as other local elections.

Every seat was contested following boundary changes which saw the number of seats reduce from 57 to 45. The count for this election was conducted on 7 May 2016.

Before the election, the composition of Winchester City Council was:

- Conservative 33
- Liberal Democrats 22
- Labour 2

The result of the election was:

- Conservatives 25
- Liberal Democrats 20.

== Results summary ==
The table below only tallies the votes of the highest polling candidate for each party within each ward. This is known as the top candidate method and is often used for multi-member plurality elections.

Winchester City Council election, 2016
Party	Seats	Gains	Losses	Net gain/loss	Seats %	Votes %	Votes	+/−
Conservative	25	25	0	▲25	55.56	40.6	16,917	
Liberal Democrats	20	20	0	▲20	44.44	34.2	14,252	
Labour	0	0	0	Steady	0.00	11.7	4,888	
Green	0	0	0	Steady	0.00	3.4	1,430	
UKIP	0	0	0	Steady	0.00	4.4	1,830	

== Ward results ==
=== Alresford & Itchen Valley ===
Alresford & Itchen Valley
Party	Candidate	Votes	%	±%
Conservative	Lisa Griffiths	1,720	51.45	
Conservative	Kim Gottlieb	1,686	50.43	
Conservative	Ernie Jeffs	1,658	49.60	
Liberal Democrats	Margot Power	1,425	42.63	
Liberal Democrats	Keith Divall	1,180	35.30	
Liberal Democrats	Russell Gordon-Smith	1,162	34.76	
Labour	Ian Wight	245	7.33	
Labour	Lee Hayes	197	5.89	
Labour	James Leppard	150	4.49	
Majority		233	6.97	
Conservative win (new seat)				
Conservative win (new seat)				
Conservative win (new seat)				

=== Badger Farm & Oliver's Battery ===
Badger Farm & Oliver's Battery
Party	Candidate	Votes	%	±%
Liberal Democrats	Eleanor Bell	1,485	46.51	
Conservative	Jan Warwick	1,386	43.41	
Liberal Democrats	Brian Laming	1,350	42.28	
Conservative	Rob Ducker	1,305	40.71	
Conservative	Gavin Dick	1,231	38.55	
Liberal Democrats	John Romero	1,198	37.52	
UKIP	Chris Bardon-Briddon	318	9.96	
Labour	Peter Rees	207	6.48	
Labour	Alun Glyn Rees	203	6.36	
Labour	Jonathan Tettmar	161	5.04	
Majority		45	157	
Liberal Democrats win (new seat)				
Conservative win (new seat)				
Liberal Democrats win (new seat)				

=== Bishop's Waltham ===
Bishop's Waltham
Party	Candidate	Votes	%	±%
Conservative	Rob Humby	1,169	52.47	
Conservative	David McLean	1,165	52.29	
Conservative	Stephen Miller	1,146	51.44	
Liberal Democrats	Thomas Houghton	393	17.64	
Liberal Democrats	Benjamin Stoneham	378	16.97	
Labour	Steve Haines	353	15.84	
UKIP	Vivienne Young	347	15.57	
Labour	Laurie Clough	313	14.05	
Labour	Steven Jakubowski	274	12.30	
Liberal Democrats	Sudhakar Achwal	230	10.32	
Majority		753	33.80	
Conservative win (new seat)				
Conservative win (new seat)				
Conservative win (new seat)				

=== Central Meon Valley ===
Central Meon Valley
Party	Candidate	Votes	%	±%
Conservative	Frank Pearson	1,576	54.99	
Conservative	Vicki Weston	1,529	53.35	
Conservative	Linda Gemmell	1,473	51.40	
Liberal Democrats	Sheila Campbell	678	23.66	
Liberal Democrats	Margret Scriven	533	18.60	
Liberal Democrats	Anne Stoneham	454	15.84	
UKIP	Leslie Mitchell	453	15.81	
Labour	Stan Evans	273	9.53	
Labour	Alexander Graft	253	8.83	
Labour	Nicola Wardrop	252	8.79	
Majority		795	27.74	
Conservative win (new seat)				
Conservative win (new seat)				
Conservative win (new seat)				

=== Colden Common and Twyford ===
Colden Common and Twyford
Party	Candidate	Votes	%	±%
Liberal Democrats	Richard Izard	1,094	58.01	
Conservative	Sue Cook	782	41.46	
Liberal Democrats	Robert Johnston	573	30.38	
Conservative	Maureen Rees	554	29.37	
Green	Julia Hallman	146	7.74	
Labour	Paul Brown	128	6.79	
Labour	Sonia Critcher	122	6.47	
Majority		209	11.08	
Liberal Democrats win (new seat)				
Conservative win (new seat)				

=== Denmead ===
Denmead
Party	Candidate	Votes	%	±%
Conservative	Mike Read	1,429	69.84	
Conservative	Patricia Stallard	1,400	68.43	
Conservative	Caroline Brook	1,188	58.06	
Liberal Democrats	Andrew Negus	433	21.16	
Labour	Claire Sorensen	387	18.91	
Liberal Democrats	Simon Wernick	278	13.59	
Labour	Jacqueline Carroll	219	10.70	
Labour	Steve Della Mora	184	8.99	
Majority		755	36.90	
Conservative win (new seat)				
Conservative win (new seat)				
Conservative win (new seat)				

=== Southwick and Wickham ===
Southwick and Wickham
Party	Candidate	Votes	%	±%
Liberal Democrats	Angela Clear	1,002	63.10	
Liberal Democrats	Therese Evans	890	56.05	
Liberal Democrats	Neil Cutler	826	52.02	
Conservative	Mags Brown	384	24.18	
Conservative	Leon Dabbs	352	22.17	
Conservative	Neil Lander-Brinkley	279	17.57	
UKIP	Ian Norgate	229	14.42	
Labour	Gary Gray	99	6.23	
Labour	Paul Sony	83	5.23	
Labour	Paul Harris	80	5.04	
Majority		442	27.84	
Liberal Democrats win (new seat)				
Liberal Democrats win (new seat)				
Liberal Democrats win (new seat)				

=== St Barnabas ===
St Barnabas
Party	Candidate	Votes	%	±%
Liberal Democrats	Kelsie Learney	1,406	42.11	
Conservative	Eileen Berry	1,395	41.88	
Liberal Democrats	Anne Weir	1,378	41.37	
Conservative	Paul Twelftree	1,317	39.54	
Conservative	Angie Wilkinson	1,112	33.38	
Liberal Democrats	Cameron Johnson	1,089	32.69	
Winchester Independent	Kezia Hoffman	661	19.84	
Labour	Hannah Field	307	9.22	
Labour	Adrian Field	293	8.80	
Labour	Tessa Valentine	274	8.23	
Majority		61	1.83	
Liberal Democrats win (new seat)				
Conservative win (new seat)				
Liberal Democrats win (new seat)				

=== St Bartholomew ===
St Bartholomew
Party	Candidate	Votes	%	±%
Liberal Democrats	Dominic Hiscock	926	34.57	
Conservative	Rose Burns	832	31.06	
Liberal Democrats	Nicki Elks	737	27.51	
Liberal Democrats	Paul Williams	667	24.90	
Conservative	Sue Falconer	563	21.02	
Green	Lucy Clement	517	19.30	
Labour	Clive Gosling	474	17.69	
Conservative	David Crudgington	466	17.39	
Winchester Independent	Michael Coker-Davies	461	17.21	
Labour	Kathleen East	441	16.46	
Green	Michael Wilks	426	15.90	
Labour	Lawrence Mason	340	12.69	
Green	Rhian Harrison	327	12.21	
UKIP	Bob Barnes	271	10.12	
Majority		70	2.61	
Liberal Democrats win (new seat)				
Conservative win (new seat)				
Liberal Democrats win (new seat)				

=== St Luke ===
St Luke
Party	Candidate	Votes	%	±%
Liberal Democrats	Jamie Scott	732	61.31	
Liberal Democrats	Derek Green	590	49.41	
Labour	Patrick Davies	247	20.69	
Labour	Andrew Adams	157	13.15	
Conservative	Harry Sampson	145	12.14	
Conservative	George Marshall-James	117	9.80	
Winchester Independents	Tomos James	102	8.54	
Green	Kia Pope	76	6.37	
Majority		343	28.72	
Liberal Democrats win (new seat)				
Liberal Democrats win (new seat)				

=== St Michael ===
St Michael
Party	Candidate	Votes	%	±%
Conservative	Fiona Mather	1,129	41.37	
Conservative	Guy Ashton	1,054	38.62	
Conservative	Ian Tait	1,041	38.15	
Labour	Janet Berry	680	24.92	
Winchester Independents	Judith Martin	624	22.87	
Labour	Sharon Montgomery	514	18.83	
Liberal Democrats	John Higgins	474	17.37	
Labour	Nicola Tettmar	457	16.75	
Liberal Democrats	Michael Elks	439	16.09	
Liberal Democrats	David Banks	357	13.08	
Green	Dinah Barton	352	12.90	
Green	Robert Parker	293	10.74	
Green	Tasha Harrison	248	9.09	
Majority		361	13.23	
Conservative win (new seat)				
Conservative win (new seat)				
Conservative win (new seat)				

=== St Paul ===
St Paul
Party	Candidate	Votes	%	±%
Liberal Democrats	Liz Hutchinson	1,174	46.64	
Liberal Democrats	Martin Tod	1,055	41.91	
Liberal Democrats	Lucille Thompson	1,008	40.05	
Conservative	George Beard	724	28.76	
Conservative	Kerry Halfpenny	702	27.89	
Conservative	Steve Russell	616	24.47	
Labour	Karen Barratt	496	19.71	
Labour	Nigel Fox	419	16.65	
Winchester Independents	TC Dunlop	385	15.30	
Labour	Jonny Morris	320	12.71	
Green	Lee Ingram	265	10.53	
Majority		284	11.29	
Liberal Democrats win (new seat)				
Liberal Democrats win (new seat)				
Liberal Democrats win (new seat)				

=== The Worthys ===
The Worthys
Party	Candidate	Votes	%	±%
Liberal Democrats	Jackie Porter	1,257	60.26	
Liberal Democrats	Jane Rutter	1,150	55.13	
Liberal Democrats	Malcolm Prince	1,049	50.29	
Conservative	Matt Palmer	642	30.78	
Conservative	Stan Howell	607	29.10	
Conservative	Tom Crofts	557	26.70	
Labour	Kimberley Torkington	218	10.45	
Labour	Catherine Hutchinson	170	8.15	
Labour	Richard Carthew	159	7.62	
Majority		407	19.51	
Liberal Democrats win (new seat)				
Liberal Democrats win (new seat)				
Liberal Democrats win (new seat)				

=== Upper Meon Valley ===
Upper Meon Valley
Party	Candidate	Votes	%	±%
Conservative	Amber Thacker	1,134	63.57	
Conservative	Laurence Ruffell	1,010	56.61	
Liberal Democrats	Chris Day	319	17.88	
Liberal Democrats	Lewis North	286	16.03	
Labour	Peter O'Sullivan	268	15.02	
Labour	Joe Tugwell	198	11.10	
Majority		691	38.73	
Conservative win (new seat)				
Conservative win (new seat)				

=== Whiteley & Shedfield ===
Whiteley & Shedfield
Party	Candidate	Votes	%	±%
Liberal Democrats	Vivian Achwal	801	43.65	
Conservative	Roger Huxstep	751	40.93	
Liberal Democrats	Roger Bentote	747	40.71	
Conservative	Andy Baker	710	38.69	
Liberal Democrats	Jonathan Fern	677	36.89	
Conservative	Cynthia Town	628	34.22	
UKIP	David Walbridge	212	11.55	
Green	Anne Coleman	150	8.17	
Labour	David Picton-Jones	113	6.16	
Independent	Malcolm Butler	110	5.99	
Labour	Anne West	109	5.94	
Labour	John Staples	83	4.52	
Majority		37	2.02	
Liberal Democrats win (new seat)				
Conservative win (new seat)				
Liberal Democrats win (new seat)				

=== Wonston & Micheldever ===
Wonston & Micheldever
Party	Candidate	Votes	%	±%
Conservative	Stephen Godfrey	1,719	64.62	
Conservative	Caroline Horrill	1,612	60.60	
Conservative	James Byrnes	1,552	58.35	
Liberal Democrats	Katy Toms	653	24.50	
Liberal Democrats	Ian Gordon	592	22.26	
Labour	Melanie Middleton	393	14.77	
Labour	Richard James	314	11.80	
Labour	Antony De Peyer	278	10.45	
Majority		899	33.85	
Conservative win (new seat)				
Conservative win (new seat)				
Conservative win (new seat)				
