= 2010 Winchester City Council election =

2010 UK local government election

| ← 2008 | 6 May 2010 | 2011 → |

19 of 57 seats to Winchester City Council 29 seats needed for a majority
| | First party | Second party |
|---|---|---|
| Party | Conservative | Liberal Democrats |
| Seats before | 29 | 24 |
| Seats won | 10 | 9 |
| Seats after | 26 | 29 |
| Popular vote | 25,743 | 24,676 |
| Percentage | 46.5% | 44.6% |
- Results by Ward
Council control before election
Conservative
Council control after election
Liberal Democrats

The 2010 Winchester Council election took place on 6 May 2010 to elect members of Winchester District Council in Hampshire, England. One third of the council was up for election and the Liberal Democrats gained overall control of the council from the Conservative Party.

After the election, the composition of the council was:

- Liberal Democrat 29
- Conservative 26
- Independent 2

== Campaign ==
The Conservatives had gained control of Winchester council in the 2006 election after a sex scandal involving the local Liberal Democrat MP Mark Oaten. Going into the 2010 election the Conservatives had a majority of just 1 seat and were defending 13 seats compared to 4 for the Liberal Democrats, due to the seats they won in 2006 being due for election in 2010. Several councillors stood down at the election, including George Hollingbery from The Alresfords ward to contest the Meon Valley constituency in the general election, Fred Allgood from Denmead ward, Georgina Busher from Bishop's Waltham and James Stephens from St Luke ward. Brian Collin also did not defend his Olivers Battery and Badger Farm ward, which he had held for 24 years, to contest St John and All Saints instead.

The Conservatives defended their record on the council pointing to a repaving of the high street, park and ride projects and keeping council tax increases below inflation. However the Liberal Democrats accused the Conservatives of running down reserves that the Liberal Democrats had built up when they were in power and were confident of taking control in particular with the election taking place at the same time as the general election. The Labour Party were defending their last seat on the council in St John and All Saints ward with predictions that Labour could be without representation on the council for the first time. Meanwhile, the Green Party only contested one seat in St Bartholomew in order to concentrate their efforts and campaigned on development issues.

== Election result ==
The results saw the Liberal Democrats take control over the council after gaining 5 seats to hold 29 of the 57 seats. This gave them an overall majority of 1 seat, despite the Conservatives winning 10 seats at the election compared to 9 for the Liberal Democrats. The Conservatives did make one gain, taking a former independent seat where the councillor Georgina Busher stood down at the election. Meanwhile, the last remaining Labour seat was lost after Labour was defeated in St John and All Saints ward.

Winchester local election result 2010
| Party | Seats | Gains | Losses | Net gain/loss | Seats % | Votes % | Votes | +/− |
|---|---|---|---|---|---|---|---|---|
| Conservative | 10 | 1 | 4 | -3 | 52.6 | 46.4 | 25,681 | +3.1 |
| Liberal Democrats | 9 | 5 | 0 | +5 | 47.4 | 44.6 | 24,676 | -1.4 |
| Labour | 0 | 0 | 1 | -1 | 0.0 | 6.7 | 3,721 | +2.3 |
| Independent | 0 | 0 | 1 | -1 | 0.0 | 1.4 | 779 | -2.2 |
| Green | 0 | 0 | 0 | 0 | 0.0 | 0.8 | 443 | -0.6 |

== Ward results ==
=== Bishops Waltham ===
Bishops Waltham
| Party | Candidate | Votes | % | ±% |
|---|---|---|---|---|
| Conservative | David Mclean | 1,552 | 38.5 | +8.1 |
| Liberal Democrats | Benjamin Stoneham | 1,479 | 36.7 | +10.8 |
| Independent | Gideon Lake | 779 | 19.3 | −19.6 |
| Labour | Steve Haines | 224 | 5.6 | +3.4 |
| Majority | | 73 | 1.8 | |
| Turnout | | 4,034 | 75.4 | +34.3 |
| Conservative gain from Independent | | Swing | | |

=== Cheriton & Bishops Sutton ===
Cheriton & Bishops Sutton
| Party | Candidate | Votes | % | ±% |
|---|---|---|---|---|
| Conservative | Harry Verney | 866 | 60.9 | −1.7 |
| Liberal Democrats | Christopher Day | 503 | 35.4 | −2.0 |
| Labour | Timothy Curran | 52 | 3.7 | +3.7 |
| Majority | | 363 | 25.5 | +0.3 |
| Turnout | | 1,421 | 80.1 | +27.1 |
| Conservative hold | | Swing | | |

=== Colden Common & Twyford ===
Colden Common & Twyford
| Party | Candidate | Votes | % | ±% |
|---|---|---|---|---|
| Liberal Democrats | Richard Izard | 1,904 | 57.0 | +4.0 |
| Conservative | Nigel Burwood | 1,285 | 38.5 | −6.1 |
| Labour | Nicholas Carr | 153 | 4.6 | +2.2 |
| Majority | | 619 | 18.5 | +10.1 |
| Turnout | | 3,342 | 77.7 | +27.0 |
| Liberal Democrats hold | | Swing | | |

=== Denmead ===
Denmead
| Party | Candidate | Votes | % | ±% |
|---|---|---|---|---|
| Conservative | Kirk Phillips | 2,535 | 65.1 | −13.0 |
| Liberal Democrats | Margaret Scriven | 1,142 | 29.3 | +10.9 |
| Labour | David Picton-Jones | 219 | 5.6 | +2.1 |
| Majority | | 1,393 | 35.8 | −23.9 |
| Turnout | | 3,896 | 74.4 | +34.7 |
| Conservative hold | | Swing | | |

=== Droxford, Soberton & Hambledon ===
Droxford, Soberton & Hambledon
| Party | Candidate | Votes | % | ±% |
|---|---|---|---|---|
| Conservative | Tony Coates | 910 | 66.4 | −12.1 |
| Liberal Democrats | Alan Hibbert | 419 | 30.6 | +9.1 |
| Labour | Alyn Edwards | 41 | 3.0 | +3.0 |
| Majority | | 491 | 35.8 | −11.2 |
| Turnout | | 1,370 | 80.8 | +21.8 |
| Conservative hold | | Swing | | |

=== Kings Worthy ===
Kings Worthy
| Party | Candidate | Votes | % | ±% |
|---|---|---|---|---|
| Liberal Democrats | Jane Rutter | 1,393 | 52.6 | −1.2 |
| Conservative | Stanley Howell | 1,098 | 41.4 | −1.5 |
| Labour | Elaine Fullaway | 158 | 6.0 | +2.7 |
| Majority | | 295 | 11.1 | +0.2 |
| Turnout | | 2,649 | 77.8 | +26.1 |
| Liberal Democrats gain from Conservative | | Swing | | |

=== Olivers Battery & Badger Farm ===
Olivers Battery & Badger Farm
| Party | Candidate | Votes | % | ±% |
|---|---|---|---|---|
| Liberal Democrats | Lynda Banister | 1,615 | 60.2 | −7.8 |
| Conservative | Kim Gottlieb | 943 | 35.1 | +8.1 |
| Labour | Margaret Rees | 126 | 4.7 | +2.9 |
| Majority | | 672 | 25.0 | −16.0 |
| Turnout | | 2,684 | 82.4 | +25.5 |
| Liberal Democrats hold | | Swing | | |

=== Owslebury & Curdridge ===
Owslebury & Curdridge
| Party | Candidate | Votes | % | ±% |
|---|---|---|---|---|
| Conservative | Laurence Ruffell | 1,330 | 55.2 | −6.7 |
| Liberal Democrats | Jo White | 983 | 40.8 | +5.6 |
| Labour | Clive Coldwell | 96 | 4.0 | +1.0 |
| Majority | | 347 | 14.4 | −12.3 |
| Turnout | | 2,409 | 78.7 | +31.7 |
| Conservative hold | | Swing | | |

=== St Barnabas ===
St Barnabas
| Party | Candidate | Votes | % | ±% |
|---|---|---|---|---|
| Liberal Democrats | Susan Witt | 1,798 | 49.3 | −4.0 |
| Conservative | Richard Worrall | 1,618 | 44.3 | +0.3 |
| Labour | Tania Ziegler | 234 | 6.4 | +3.7 |
| Majority | | 180 | 4.9 | −4.4 |
| Turnout | | 3,650 | 76.5 | +21.3 |
| Liberal Democrats gain from Conservative | | Swing | | |

=== St Bartholomew ===
St Bartholomew
| Party | Candidate | Votes | % | ±% |
|---|---|---|---|---|
| Liberal Democrats | Dominic Hiscock | 1,802 | 50.6 | −1.1 |
| Conservative | Paul Wing | 1,114 | 31.3 | −2.6 |
| Green | Alison Craig | 443 | 12.4 | +4.6 |
| Labour | Denis Archdeacon | 205 | 5.8 | +1.1 |
| Majority | | 688 | 19.3 | +1.5 |
| Turnout | | 3,564 | | |
| Liberal Democrats hold | | Swing | | |

=== St John & All Saints ===
St John & All Saints
| Party | Candidate | Votes | % | ±% |
|---|---|---|---|---|
| Liberal Democrats | Brian Collin | 1,217 | 41.2 | +1.4 |
| Labour | Chris Pines | 993 | 33.6 | +3.8 |
| Conservative | James Byrnes | 743 | 25.2 | −0.2 |
| Majority | | 224 | 7.6 | −2.4 |
| Turnout | | 2,953 | 63.2 | +30.3 |
| Liberal Democrats gain from Labour | | Swing | | |

=== St Luke ===
St Luke
| Party | Candidate | Votes | % | ±% |
|---|---|---|---|---|
| Liberal Democrats | Rose Prowse | 1,397 | 52.1 | −0.3 |
| Conservative | Jamie Scott | 1,038 | 38.7 | +2.9 |
| Labour | Peter Rees | 247 | 9.2 | −2.6 |
| Majority | | 359 | 13.4 | −3.2 |
| Turnout | | 2,682 | 63.7 | +27.7 |
| Liberal Democrats gain from Conservative | | Swing | | |

=== St Michael ===
St Michael
| Party | Candidate | Votes | % | ±% |
|---|---|---|---|---|
| Conservative | Ian Tait | 1,799 | 50.4 | −1.2 |
| Liberal Democrats | Tony Ayres | 1,582 | 44.4 | +4.6 |
| Labour | Antony De Peyer | 185 | 5.2 | +2.4 |
| Majority | | 217 | 6.1 | −5.7 |
| Turnout | | 3,566 | 75.2 | +27.0 |
| Conservative hold | | Swing | | |

=== St Paul ===
St Paul
| Party | Candidate | Votes | % | ±% |
|---|---|---|---|---|
| Liberal Democrats | Ray Pearce | 2,021 | 57.9 | +0.2 |
| Conservative | Helen Osborne | 1,240 | 35.5 | +5.9 |
| Labour | Adrian Field | 230 | 6.6 | +2.1 |
| Majority | | 781 | 22.4 | −5.7 |
| Turnout | | 3,491 | 74.1 | +37.6 |
| Liberal Democrats hold | | Swing | | |

=== Shedfield ===
Shedfield
| Party | Candidate | Votes | % | ±% |
|---|---|---|---|---|
| Conservative | Roger Huxstep | 1,497 | 63.4 | +13.3 |
| Liberal Democrats | Michael Toole | 743 | 31.5 | +19.3 |
| Labour | Pat Hayward | 122 | 5.2 | +0.4 |
| Majority | | 754 | 31.9 | +10.1 |
| Turnout | | 2,362 | 67.0 | +22.3 |
| Conservative hold | | Swing | | |

=== Sparsholt ===
Sparsholt
| Party | Candidate | Votes | % | ±% |
|---|---|---|---|---|
| Conservative | Keith Wood | 668 | 60.9 | −1.1 |
| Liberal Democrats | Victoria Kilroy | 397 | 36.2 | −1.8 |
| Labour | Tessa Valentine | 32 | 2.9 | +2.9 |
| Majority | | 271 | 24.7 | +0.7 |
| Turnout | | 1,097 | 71.6 | +19.6 |
| Conservative hold | | Swing | | |

=== Swanmore & Newton ===
Swanmore & Newtown
| Party | Candidate | Votes | % | ±% |
|---|---|---|---|---|
| Conservative | Vicki Weston | 1,549 | 57.6 | −19.0 |
| Liberal Democrats | Sheila Campbell | 1,024 | 38.1 | +14.7 |
| Labour | Robert Rudge | 115 | 4.3 | +4.3 |
| Majority | | 525 | 19.5 | −33.7 |
| Turnout | | 2,688 | 80.5 | +31.5 |
| Conservative hold | | Swing | | |

=== The Alresfords ===
The Alresfords
| Party | Candidate | Votes | % | ±% |
|---|---|---|---|---|
| Liberal Democrats | Margot Power | 1,972 | 48.9 | −8.9 |
| Conservative | Ken Yeldham | 1,906 | 47.2 | +11.7 |
| Labour | Robin Atkins | 156 | 3.9 | +2.2 |
| Majority | | 66 | 1.6 | −20.7 |
| Turnout | | 4,034 | 79.7 | +26.2 |
| Liberal Democrats gain from Conservative | | Swing | | |

=== Wonston & Micheldever ===
Wonston & Micheldever
| Party | Candidate | Votes | % | ±% |
|---|---|---|---|---|
| Conservative | Stephen Godfrey | 1,990 | 58.4 | −15.9 |
| Liberal Democrats | Richard Coleman | 1,285 | 37.7 | +16.0 |
| Labour | Andrew Adams | 133 | 3.9 | −0.1 |
| Majority | | 705 | 20.7 | −31.9 |
| Turnout | | 3,408 | 78.8 | +36.5 |
| Conservative hold | | Swing | | |

| Preceded by 2008 Winchester Council election | Winchester local elections | Succeeded by 2011 Winchester City Council election |
