= 2008 Winchester City Council election =

Local election in England

← 2007	1 May 2008	2010 →

19 of 57 seats to Winchester City Council 29 seats needed for a majority
	First party	Second party	Third party
Party	Liberal Democrats	Conservative	Independent
Seats before	23	29	4
Seats won	12	6	1
Seats after	24	29	3
Popular vote	15,511	14,609	1,225
Percentage	46.0%	43.3%	3.6%
- Results by Ward
Council control before election
Conservative
Council control after election
Conservative

The 2008 Winchester Council election took place on 1 May 2008 to elect members of Winchester District Council in Hampshire, England. One third of the council was up for election and the Conservative Party stayed in overall control of the council.

After the election, the composition of the council was:

- Conservative 29
- Liberal Democrat 24
- Independent 3
- Labour 1

== Campaign ==
One third of the seats were being contested with the Conservatives, Liberal Democrats and Labour each contesting all 19 seats. The Conservatives, who ran the council since the 2006 election were defending 6 seats compared to 11 for the Liberal Democrats and 2 independents. Among the councillors who were defending seats were the Conservative council leader, George Beckett, and the Liberal Democrat group leader Therese Evans. Other candidates included 2 independents, 7 from the United Kingdom Independence Party and 4 from the Green Party.

The Conservatives defended their record of running the council saying that they had improved services while keeping council tax rises below the rate of inflation. Meanwhile, the Liberal Democrats criticised the Conservatives over housing and development in the council area.

During the campaign a Conservative activist in Whiteley ward, John Hall, was charged after a police investigation over electoral fraud offences.

== Election result ==
The results saw the Conservatives just maintain their one-seat majority after losing two seats to the Liberal Democrats in St Barnabas and Whiteley wards, but gaining one seat back in St Michael and taking one seat from an independent in Shedfield.

Winchester local election result 2008
Party	Seats	Gains	Losses	Net gain/loss	Seats %	Votes %	Votes	+/−
Liberal Democrats	12	2	1	+1	63.2	46.0	15,511	+6.2%
Conservative	6	2	2	0	31.6	43.3	14,609	-7.0%
Independent	1	0	1	-1	5.3	3.6	1,225	+0.3%
Labour	0	0	0	0	0	4.4	1,492	+0.0%
Green	0	0	0	0	0	1.4	456	+0.8%
UKIP	0	0	0	0	0	1.3	451	-0.2%

== Ward results ==
=== Bishop's Waltham ===
Bishop's Waltham
Party	Candidate	Votes	%	±%
Independent	Jean Hammerton	832	38.9	−7.7
Conservative	Michael North	650	30.4	−6.7
Liberal Democrats	Brandy Blunt	553	25.9	+13.7
UKIP	William McNally	57	2.7	+2.7
Labour	David Picton-Jones	47	2.2	−1.8
Majority		182	8.5	−1.0
Turnout		2,139	41.1	
Independent hold		Swing		

=== Boarhunt & Southwick ===
Boarhunt & Southwick
Party	Candidate	Votes	%	±%
Conservative	John Cooper	294	50.4	+0.3
Liberal Democrats	Steve Nicholls	273	46.8	+7.3
Labour	James Ross	16	2.7	−1.2
Majority		21	3.6	−7.0
Turnout		583	58.4	−0.3
Conservative hold		Swing		

=== Colden Common and Twyford ===
Colden Common and Twyford
Party	Candidate	Votes	%	±%
Liberal Democrats	Peter Mason	1,118	53.0	−6.0
Conservative	Sue Evershed	942	44.6	+6.0
Labour	Timothy Curran	51	2.4	+0.0
Majority		176	8.4	−12.0
Turnout		2,111	50.7	
Liberal Democrats hold		Swing		

=== Compton and Otterbourne ===
Compton and Otterbourne
Party	Candidate	Votes	%	±%
Conservative	George Beckett	954	51.7	+7.6
Liberal Democrats	Suzanne Hudson	820	44.4	−6.0
UKIP	Christopher Barton-Briddon	48	2.6	−2.0
Labour	Clare McKenna	23	1.2	+0.3
Majority		134	7.3	
Turnout		1,845	57.7	
Conservative hold		Swing		

=== Denmead ===
Denmead
Party	Candidate	Votes	%	±%
Conservative	Michael Read	1,611	78.1	−2.4
Liberal Democrats	Anne Stoneham	379	18.4	−1.1
Labour	Michael Chaplin	73	3.5	+3.5
Majority		1,232	59.7	−1.3
Turnout		2,063	39.7	
Conservative hold		Swing		

=== Kings Worthy ===
Kings Worthy
Party	Candidate	Votes	%	±%
Liberal Democrats	Robert Johnston	938	53.8	+9.3
Conservative	John White	747	42.9	−8.1
Labour	Elaine Fullaway	58	3.3	−1.2
Majority		191	10.9	
Turnout		1,743	51.7	
Liberal Democrats hold		Swing		

=== Littleton and Harestock ===
Littleton and Harestock
Party	Candidate	Votes	%	±%
Liberal Democrats	Jacey Jackson	970	59.9	+2.1
Conservative	Patrick Cunningham	627	38.7	−1.7
Labour	Brian Fullaway	23	1.4	−0.4
Majority		343	21.2	+3.8
Turnout		1,620	57.7	
Liberal Democrats hold		Swing		

=== Olivers Battery & Badger Farm ===
Olivers Battery & Badger Farm
Party	Candidate	Votes	%	±%
Liberal Democrats	David Spender	1,251	68.0	+19.3
Conservative	Sally Owen	497	27.0	−21.2
Green	Jim Kirkpatrick	59	3.2	+3.2
Labour	John Elliot-Smith	34	1.8	−1.3
Majority		754	41.0	+40.5
Turnout		1,841	56.9	
Liberal Democrats hold		Swing		

=== Shedfield ===
Shedfield
Party	Candidate	Votes	%	±%
Conservative	Linda Gemmell	695	50.1	+5.6
Independent	Stuart Jones	393	28.3	−9.7
Liberal Democrats	Michael Toole	170	12.2	+12.2
Labour	Patricia Hayward	66	4.8	−0.8
UKIP	Douglas Reed	64	4.6	+4.6
Majority		302	21.8	+15.3
Turnout		1,388	44.7	
Conservative gain from Independent		Swing		

=== St. Barnabas ===
St. Barnabas
Party	Candidate	Votes	%	±%
Liberal Democrats	Allan Mitchell	1,401	53.3	+10.2
Conservative	Anne Saunders	1,157	44.0	−5.6
Labour	Adrian Field	72	2.7	−0.2
Majority		244	9.3	
Turnout		2,630	55.2	
Liberal Democrats gain from Conservative		Swing		

=== St. Bartholomew ===
St. Bartholomew
Party	Candidate	Votes	%	±%
Liberal Democrats	Jim Maynard	1,085	51.7	−2.7
Conservative	Miff Kayum	711	33.9	−3.6
Green	Jo Woodman	163	7.8	+7.8
Labour	Denis Archdeacon	98	4.7	+0.3
UKIP	Lawrence Hole	42	2.0	+2.0
Majority		374	17.8	+0.9
Turnout		2,099	43.8	
Liberal Democrats hold		Swing		

=== St. John and All Saints ===
St. John and All Saints
Party	Candidate	Votes	%	±%
Liberal Democrats	John Higgins	611	39.8	−3.5
Labour	Antony De Peyer	458	29.8	+4.5
Conservative	Ann Jones	390	25.4	−2.5
UKIP	Geoffrey Barrett	78	5.1	+1.6
Majority		153	10.0	−5.4
Turnout		1,537	32.9	
Liberal Democrats hold		Swing		

=== St. Luke ===
St. Luke
Party	Candidate	Votes	%	±%
Liberal Democrats	Lucille Thompson	792	52.4	−0.7
Conservative	Rob Ducker	542	35.8	+2.6
Labour	Patrick Davies	178	11.8	+2.6
Majority		250	16.6	−3.3
Turnout		1,512	36.0	
Liberal Democrats hold		Swing		

=== St. Michael ===
St. Michael
Party	Candidate	Votes	%	±%
Conservative	Robert Sanders	1,166	51.6	−7.1
Liberal Democrats	Lynda Banister	900	39.8	+6.4
Green	Alison Craig	99	4.4	+4.4
Labour	Albert Edwards	63	2.8	−2.0
UKIP	David Abbott	33	1.5	−1.6
Majority		266	11.8	−13.5
Turnout		2,261	48.2	
Conservative gain from Liberal Democrats		Swing		

=== St. Paul ===
St. Paul
Party	Candidate	Votes	%	±%
Liberal Democrats	Ray Love	953	57.7	−1.2
Conservative	Kathleen Jeffreys	489	29.6	−7.2
Green	Bridget Leyden	135	8.2	+8.2
Labour	Tessa Valentine	74	4.5	+0.2
Majority		464	28.1	+6.0
Turnout		1,651	36.5	
Liberal Democrats hold		Swing		

=== The Alresfords ===
The Alresfords
Party	Candidate	Votes	%	±%
Liberal Democrats	Simon Cook	1,505	57.8	+28.0
Conservative	Barbara Jeffs	923	35.5	−19.2
UKIP	David Samuel	129	5.0	−3.7
Labour	Robin Atkins	45	1.7	−5.0
Majority		582	22.3	
Turnout		2,602	53.5	
Liberal Democrats hold		Swing		

=== Whiteley ===
Whiteley
Party	Candidate	Votes	%	±%
Liberal Democrats	Vivian Achwal	551	53.5	+6.0
Conservative	Mark Wheeler	459	44.6	−4.9
Labour	Barry Jones	20	1.9	−1.1
Majority		92	8.9	
Turnout		1,030	45.2	
Liberal Democrats gain from Conservative		Swing		

=== Wickham ===
Wickham
Party	Candidate	Votes	%	±%
Liberal Democrats	Therese Evans	857	64.8	+3.7
Conservative	Karen Jeffreys	442	33.4	−3.2
Labour	Andrew Rudge	23	1.7	−0.6
Majority		415	31.4	+6.9
Turnout		1,322	43.2	
Liberal Democrats hold		Swing		

=== Wonston and Micheldever ===
Wonston and Micheldever
Party	Candidate	Votes	%	±%
Conservative	Barry Lipscomb	1,313	74.3	+11.0
Liberal Democrats	Simon Hobson	384	21.7	−5.6
Labour	Nigel Lickley	70	4.0	+0.1
Majority		929	52.6	+16.6
Turnout		1,767	42.3	
Conservative hold		Swing		

Preceded by 2007 Winchester Council election	Winchester local elections	Succeeded by 2010 Winchester Council election
