= 2011 Winchester City Council election =

2011 UK local government election

← 2010	5 May 2011	2012 →

19 of 57 seats to Winchester City Council 29 seats needed for a majority
	First party	Second party
Party	Conservative	Liberal Democrats
Last election	26	29
Seats won	11	6
Seats after	27	27
Popular vote	18,966	13,556
Percentage	48.2%	34.5%
	Third party	Fourth party
Party	Labour	Independent
Seats before	0	2
Seats won	1	1
Seats after	1	2
Popular vote	4,598	1,360
Percentage	11.7%	3.5%
- Results by Ward
Council control before election
Liberal Democrats
Council control after election
No overall control

The 2011 Winchester Council election took place on 5 May 2011 to elect members of Winchester City Council in Hampshire, England. One third of the council was up for election. The Conservatives won 11 seats, the Liberal Democrats 6, and Labour and Independents one each.

After the election, the composition of the council was:

- Conservatives: 27
- Liberal Democrats: 27
- Independent: 2
- Labour: 1

Whilst the council remained under no overall control, with the Conservatives and Liberal Democrats both holding 27 seats, the Conservatives gained control of the council. The two independent and one Labour councillors abstained, with the then-Conservative mayor holding the casting vote.
