= 2004 Winchester City Council election =

2004 UK local government election

← 2003	10 May 2004	2006 →

19 of 57 seats to Winchester City Council 29 seats needed for a majority
	First party	Second party
Party	Liberal Democrats	Conservative
Seats before	29	18
Seats won	11	6
Seats after	26	22
Seat change	▼3	▲4
Popular vote	14,425	14,271
Percentage	42.1%	41.7%
	Third party	Fourth party
Party	Independent	Labour
Seats before	5	5
Seats won	2	-1
Seats after	4	5
Seat change	Steady	▼1
Popular vote	2,035	2,537
Percentage	5.9%	7.4%
- Results by Ward
Council control before election
No overall control
Council control after election
Liberal Democrats

The 2004 Winchester Council election took place on 10 June 2004 to elect members of Winchester District Council in Hampshire, England. One third of the council was up for election and the Liberal Democrats lost overall control of the council to no overall control.

== Campaign ==
19 seats were contested in the election with the Liberal Democrats defending 14, the Conservatives and Independents 2 each and Labour 1 seat. The Liberal Democrats were expected to be deprived of their majority on the council as they only needed to lose 1 seat for this to happen. The Conservatives were the main challengers, with Labour only in contention in the wards of St John and All Saints and St Luke. With the election being held at the same time as the European elections, the presence of 6 candidates from the United Kingdom Independence Party for the first time was seen as possibly affecting the results.

Issues in the election included planning, the status of local neighbourhoods and the council tax.

== Election result ==
The Liberal Democrats lost their majority on the council for the first time since 1995, with the Conservatives gaining 4 seats from them. However the Liberal Democrats did gain one seat from Labour in St John and All Saints ward. Voter turnout in the election was significantly up at 48.8%, compared to 39.76% in the 2003 election.

Following the election the Liberal Democrats continued to run the council as a minority administration.

Winchester local election result 2004
Party	Seats	Gains	Losses	Net gain/loss	Seats %	Votes %	Votes	+/−
Liberal Democrats	11	1	4	-3	57.9	42.1	14,425	+1.1
Conservative	6	4	0	+4	31.6	41.7	14,271	-4.1
Independent	2	0	0	0	10.5	5.9	2,035	+1.9
Labour	0	0	1	-1	0.0	7.4	2,537	-1.9
UKIP	0	0	0	0	0.0	2.8	971	+2.8

== Ward results ==
=== Bishop's Waltham ===
Bishop's Waltham
Party	Candidate	Votes	%	±%
Independent	Jean Hammerton	1,083	45.2	−5.9
Conservative	Sally Lees	630	26.3	−1.0
Liberal Democrats	Heregoo Kaushik	581	24.2	+7.1
Labour	Stephen Haines	102	4.3	−0.2
Majority		453	18.9	−4.9
Turnout		2,396	46.6	+13.7
Independent hold		Swing		

=== Boarhunt & Southwick ===
Boarhunt & Southwick
Party	Candidate	Votes	%	±%
Conservative	John Cooper	283	50.1	+2.2
Liberal Democrats	Stephen Nicholls	223	39.5	−12.6
Independent	Mike Roberts	37	6.5	+6.5
Labour	James Ross	22	3.9	+3.9
Majority		60	10.6	
Turnout		565	58.7	+8.4
Conservative gain from Liberal Democrats		Swing		

=== Colden Common and Twyford ===
Colden Common and Twyford
Party	Candidate	Votes	%	±%
Liberal Democrats	Cecily Sutton	1,274	61.4	−1.8
Conservative	Oliver Davis	676	32.6	+0.6
Labour	Clare McKenna	126	6.1	+1.3
Majority		598	28.8	−2.4
Turnout		2,074	51.0	+12.6
Liberal Democrats hold		Swing		

=== Compton and Otterbourne ===
Compton and Otterbourne
Party	Candidate	Votes	%	±%
Conservative	George Beckett	909	49.4	−5.0
Liberal Democrats	Charlotte Bailey	786	42.7	+0.6
UKIP	Lawrence Hole	109	5.9	+5.9
Labour	John Craig	35	1.9	−1.7
Majority		123	6.7	−5.6
Turnout		1,839	59.6	+14.4
Conservative gain from Liberal Democrats		Swing		

=== Denmead ===
Denmead
Party	Candidate	Votes	%	±%
Conservative	Michael Read	1,529	71.8	0.0
Liberal Democrats	Benjamin Stoneham	517	24.3	−0.7
Labour	David Picton-Jones	85	4.0	+0.8
Majority		1,012	47.5	+0.7
Turnout		2,131	42.9	+8.1
Conservative hold		Swing		

=== Kings Worthy ===
Kings Worthy
Party	Candidate	Votes	%	±%
Liberal Democrats	Robert Johnston	693	45.1	
Conservative	Stanley Howell	636	41.4	
UKIP	Gwendoline Girdwood	130	8.5	
Labour	Elaine Fullaway	79	5.1	
Majority		57	3.7	
Turnout		1,538	48.8	+6.9
Liberal Democrats hold		Swing		

=== Littleton and Harestock ===
Littleton and Harestock
Party	Candidate	Votes	%	±%
Liberal Democrats	Jacey Jackson	844	51.6	−15.8
Conservative	Susan Evershed	735	44.9	+17.6
Labour	Tessa Valentine	58	3.5	−1.9
Majority		109	6.7	−33.4
Turnout		1,637	59.6	+13.5
Liberal Democrats hold		Swing		

=== Olivers Battery & Badger Farm ===
Olivers Battery & Badger Farm
Party	Candidate	Votes	%	±%
Liberal Democrats	Robin Darbyshire	1,038	57.9	
Conservative	Carole Marits	666	37.1	
Labour	Pamela Smith	90	5.0	
Majority		372	20.8	
Turnout		1,794	55.2	+5.5
Liberal Democrats hold		Swing		

=== Shedfield ===
Shedfield
Party	Candidate	Votes	%	±%
Independent	Ashley Goodall	730	49.9	
Conservative	Roger Huxstep	641	43.8	
Labour	Oliver De Peyer	92	6.3	
Majority		89	6.1	
Turnout		1,463	49.0	+5.5
Independent hold		Swing		

=== St. Barnabas ===
St. Barnabas
Party	Candidate	Votes	%	±%
Conservative	Anne Saunders	1,210	49.0	−6.2
Liberal Democrats	Jacqueline Porter	1,093	44.3	+5.4
Labour	Adrian Field	165	6.7	+0.9
Majority		117	4.7	−11.6
Turnout		2,468	55.4	+9.2
Conservative gain from Liberal Democrats		Swing		

=== St. Bartholomew ===
St. Bartholomew
Party	Candidate	Votes	%	±%
Liberal Democrats	James Maynard	967	46.6	−3.2
Conservative	Ian Jones	726	35.0	−4.1
Labour	Denis Archdeacon	209	10.1	−1.0
UKIP	Roy Green	172	8.3	+8.3
Majority		241	11.6	+0.9
Turnout		2,074	45.4	+10.8
Liberal Democrats hold		Swing		

=== St. John and All Saints ===
St. John and All Saints
Party	Candidate	Votes	%	±%
Liberal Democrats	John Higgins	584	32.6	−0.3
Labour	Ann Craig	525	29.3	−9.7
Conservative	Michael Lovegrove	453	25.3	−2.8
UKIP	Geoffrey Barrett	227	12.7	+12.7
Majority		59	3.3	
Turnout		1,789	39.3	+9.8
Liberal Democrats gain from Labour		Swing		

=== St. Luke ===
St. Luke
Party	Candidate	Votes	%	±%
Liberal Democrats	Ernest Nunn	671	42.5	+17.5
Conservative	Richard Worrall	586	37.2	+14.3
Labour	Debra Grech	320	20.3	−12.6
Majority		85	5.3	
Turnout		1,577	38.9	+7.7
Liberal Democrats hold		Swing		

=== St. Michael ===
St. Michael
Party	Candidate	Votes	%	±%
Liberal Democrats	John Beveridge	973	43.9	+1.6
Conservative	Felicia Drummond	902	40.7	−10.1
UKIP	Judith Napier-Clark	156	7.0	+7.0
Independent	Frank Williams	99	4.5	+4.5
Labour	Albert Edwards	86	3.9	−3.1
Majority		71	3.2	
Turnout		2,216	50.9	+11.6
Liberal Democrats hold		Swing		

=== St. Paul ===
St. Paul
Party	Candidate	Votes	%	±%
Liberal Democrats	Raymond Love	1,011	56.4	−5.9
Conservative	Gillian Allen	604	33.7	+6.2
Labour	Carol Orchard	177	9.9	−0.3
Majority		407	22.7	−12.1
Turnout		1,792	42.1	+14.8
Liberal Democrats hold		Swing		

=== The Alresfords ===
The Alresfords
Party	Candidate	Votes	%	±%
Liberal Democrats	Simon Cook	1,199	42.8	+8.5
Conservative	Sarah Verney	1,148	41.0	−5.1
Labour	Robin Atkins	190	6.8	−12.8
UKIP	John Clark	177	6.3	+6.3
Independent	Mark Luckham	86	3.1	+3.1
Majority		51	1.8	
Turnout		2,800	57.4	+11.3
Liberal Democrats hold		Swing		

=== Whiteley ===
Whiteley
Party	Candidate	Votes	%	±%
Conservative	Kate Chapman	385	51.0	−4.7
Liberal Democrats	Brenda Hatch	344	45.6	+5.6
Labour	David Smith	26	3.4	−0.9
Majority		41	5.4	−10.3
Turnout		755	39.0	+9.7
Conservative gain from Liberal Democrats		Swing		

=== Wickham ===
Wickham
Party	Candidate	Votes	%	±%
Liberal Democrats	Therese Evans	864	65.8	+7.4
Conservative	Graeme Quar	388	29.6	−9.3
Labour	Patricia Hayward	61	4.6	+1.9
Majority		476	36.2	+16.7
Turnout		1,313	49.4	+6.4
Liberal Democrats hold		Swing		

=== Wonston and Micheldever ===
Wonston and Micheldever
Party	Candidate	Votes	%	±%
Conservative	Barry Lipscomb	1,164	57.7	+3.3
Liberal Democrats	Simon Girling	763	37.8	−3.7
Labour	Nigel Lickley	89	4.4	+0.2
Majority		401	19.9	+7.0
Turnout		2,016	49.4	−16.3
Conservative hold		Swing		

Preceded by 2003 Winchester Council election	Winchester local elections	Succeeded by 2006 Winchester Council election
