= 2012 Winchester City Council election =

2012 UK local government election

← 2011	3 May 2012	2014 →

19 of the 57 seats to Winchester City Council 29 seats needed for a majority
	First party	Second party	Third party
Party	Conservative	Liberal Democrats	Labour
- Results by Ward
Council control before election
No Overall Control
Council control after election
Conservative

The 2012 Winchester Council election took place on 3 May 2012 to elect members of Winchester City Council in England, on the same day as other local elections.

The Conservative Party gained an overall majority on the council, which previously had been under no overall control.

== Ward results ==
=== Bishops Waltham ===
Bishop's Waltham
Party	Candidate	Votes	%	±%
Conservative	Stephen Charles Miller	1,024		
Liberal Democrats	Roy Sydney Stainton	379		
Labour	Stephen Haines	282		
Majority		645		
Turnout		1,685	31.29	
Conservative hold		Swing		

=== Boarhunt & Southwick ===
Boarhunt & Southwick
Party	Candidate	Votes	%	±%
Liberal Democrats	Neil Richard Cutler	302		
Conservative	John Cooper	217		
Labour	Pamela Margaret Rudge	23		
Majority		85		
Turnout		270	52.36	
Liberal Democrats hold		Swing		

=== Coldon Common & Twyford ===
Colden Common & Twyford
Party	Candidate	Votes	%	±%
Liberal Democrats	Peter Mason	1052		
Conservative	Roly Fisher	573		
Labour	Sarah Jane Critcher	174		
Majority		479		
Turnout		1,799	41.35%	
Liberal Democrats hold		Swing		

=== Compton & Otterbourne ===
Compton & Otterbourne
Party	Candidate	Votes	%	±%
Conservative	Mike Southgate	872		
Liberal Democrats	Eleanor Bell	688		
Labour	James Edwin Leppard	64		
Majority		204		
Turnout		1,604	48.07%	
Conservative hold		Swing		

=== Denmead ===
Denmead
Party	Candidate	Votes	%	±%
Conservative	Mike Read	1,242		
Liberal Democrats	Margaret Scriven	209		
Labour	David John Henry Picton-Jones	185		
Majority		1,033		
Turnout		1,636	29.86	
Conservative hold		Swing		

=== Kings Worthy ===
Kings Worthy
Party	Candidate	Votes	%	±%
Liberal Democrats	Robert Johnston	755		
Conservative	Ann Jones	576		
Labour Co-op	Elaine Mary Fullaway	145		
Majority		179		
Turnout		1,476	41.63%	
Liberal Democrats hold		Swing		

=== Littleton & Harestock ===
Littleton & Harestock
Party	Candidate	Votes	%	±%
Conservative	James Barry Byrnes	711		
Liberal Democrats	Ian Towson	632		
Labour	Will Boisseau	114		
Majority		79		
Turnout		1,476	50.56	
Conservative hold		Swing		

=== Olivers Battery & Badger Farm ===
Olivers Battery & Badger Farm
Party	Candidate	Votes	%	±%
Liberal Democrats	Brian Laming	902		
Conservative	Leanne Gina Wheeler	446		
Labour	Hum Qureshi	156		
Majority		1,504		
Turnout		1,504	45.81	
Liberal Democrats hold		Swing		

=== Shedfield ===
Shedfield
Party	Candidate	Votes	%	±%
Conservative	Linda Eileen Elizabeth	691		
Labour	Pat Hayward	186		
Liberal Democrats	Roger John Bentote	178		
Majority		505		
Turnout		1,055	33.39	
Liberal Democrats hold		Swing		

=== St Barnabas ===
St Barnabas
Party	Candidate	Votes	%	±%
Liberal Democrats	Anne Weir	1066		
Conservative	Helen Caroline Obsorne	1018		
Labour	Tania Paula Jeanette Ziegler	251		
Majority		48		
Turnout		2,335	47.78	
Liberal Democrats hold		Swing		

=== St Bartholomew ===
St Bartholomew
Party	Candidate	Votes	%	±%
Liberal Democrats	Jim Maynard	821		
Conservative	Rosemary Burns	646		
Green	Michael Wilks	377		
Labour	Archdeacon Denis John Joseph	216		
Majority		175		
Turnout		2,060	41.52	
Liberal Democrats hold		Swing		

=== St John & All Saints ===
St John and All Saints
Party	Candidate	Votes	%	±%
Labour	Janet Mary Berry	682		
Liberal Democrats	John Higgins	324		
Conservative	Candice Cutler	301		
Independent	Adrian Hicks	158		
TUSC	Adele Guntrip	31		
Majority		358		
Turnout		1,496	32.6	
Labour hold		Swing		

=== St Luke ===
St Luke
Party	Candidate	Votes	%	±%
Conservative	Derek Robert Green	547		
Liberal Democrats	Lucille Thompson	503		
Labour	Clive Malcom Gosling	333		
Majority		44		
Turnout		1,383	32.21	
Conservative hold		Swing		

=== St Michael ===
St Michael
Party	Candidate	Votes	%	±%
Conservative	Robert David Sanders	1047		
Liberal Democrats	Tony Ayres	598		
Labour	William Cooper	221		
Majority		449		
Turnout		1,866	35.8	
Conservative hold		Swing		

=== St Paul ===
St Paul
Party	Candidate	Votes	%	±%
Liberal Democrats	Martin Tod	899		
Conservative	Alexis Fall	442		
Labour	Nigel Fox	300		
Majority		457		
Turnout		1,641	34.24	
Liberal Democrats hold		Swing		

=== The Alresfords ===
The Alresfords
Party	Candidate	Votes	%	±%
Liberal Democrats	Simon Cook	1273		
Conservative	Lisa Suzanne Griffiths	959		
Labour	Ian Duncan Wight	152		
Majority		314		
Turnout		2,384	46.75	
Liberal Democrats hold		Swing		

=== Whiteley ===
Whiteley
Party	Candidate	Votes	%	±%
Liberal Democrats	Vivian Sudhakar Achwal	423		
Conservative	Pat Thew	249		
Labour	Sheena King	68		
Majority		174		
Turnout		746	31.06	
Liberal Democrats hold		Swing		

=== Wickham ===
Wickham
Party	Candidate	Votes	%	±%
Liberal Democrats	Therese Evans	874		
Conservative	Caroline Alison Sarah Dibden	339		
Labour	Robert Rudge	72		
Majority		535		
Turnout		1,285	38.32	
Liberal Democrats hold		Swing		

=== Wonston & Micheldever ===
Wonston & Micheldever
Party	Candidate	Votes	%	±%
Conservative	Barry Lipscomb	1153		
Liberal Democrats	David Keston	288		
Labour	Andrew Timothy	225		
Majority		865		
Turnout		1666	37.55	
Conservative hold		Swing		
