= 2014 Winchester City Council election =

2014 UK local government election

← 2012	22 May 2014	2015 →

19 of the 57 seats to Winchester City Council 29 seats needed for a majority
	First party	Second party	Third party
Party	Conservative	Liberal Democrats	Labour
Seats won	12	6	1
Seats after	33	28	1
Seat change	▲1	▼2	▲1
Popular vote	14,560	10,553	3,616
Percentage	43.1%	31.2%	10.7%
- Results by Ward
Council control before election
Conservative
Council control after election
No Overall Control

The 2014 Winchester City Council election took place on 22 May 2014 to elect members of Winchester City Council in England. This was on the same day as other local elections.

After the election, the composition of Winchester City Council was:

- Conservative 28
- Liberal Democrat 25
- Labour 3
- Independent 1

== Election results ==
Winchester local election result 2014
Party	Seats	Gains	Losses	Net gain/loss	Seats %	Votes %	Votes	+/−
Conservative	11	1	0	+1	49.1	43.1	14,560	
Liberal Democrats	7	0	2	-2	43.8	31.2	10,553	
Labour	1	1	0	+1	5.2	10.7	3,616	
UKIP	0	0	0	0	0	9.3	3,158	
Independent	0	0	1	-1	0	2.2	739	
Green	0	0	0	0	0	1.3	434	
TUSC	0	0	0	0	0	0.2	69	

== Ward results ==
=== Bishop's Waltham ===
Bishop's Waltham
Party	Candidate	Votes	%	±%
Conservative	David McLean	1,024	43.02	
Liberal Democrats	Roger Bentote	794	33.36	
UKIP	Vivienne Young	414	17.39	
Labour	Steven Jakubowski	134	5.63	
Majority		230	9.66	
Turnout		2,380	43.64	
Conservative hold		Swing		

=== Colden Common and Twyford ===
Colden Common and Twyford
Party	Candidate	Votes	%	±%
Liberal Democrats	Richard Izard	1,057	49.60	
Conservative	Jade Cornwall	609	28.57	
UKIP	Nigel Burwood	310	14.54	
Labour	Steven Jakubowski	146	6.85	
Majority		448	21.02	
Turnout		2,131	47.65	
Liberal Democrats hold		Swing		

=== Cheriton & Bishop's Sutton ===
Cheriton and Bishops Sutton
Party	Candidate	Votes	%	±%
Conservative	Harry Verney	436	51.78	
Liberal Democrats	Christopher Day	178	21.14	
UKIP	Mark Jones	163	19.35	
Labour	Toby North	58	6.88	
Majority		258	12.10	
Turnout		1,443	77.30	
Conservative hold		Swing		

=== Denmead ===
Denmead
Party	Candidate	Votes	%	±%
Conservative	David Phillips	1,206	54.54	
UKIP	Judith Clementson	622	28.13	
Liberal Democrats	Margaret Scriven	208	9.40	
Labour	Steven Jakubowski	160	7.23	
Majority		584	26.41	
Turnout		2,211	38.10	
Conservative hold		Swing		

=== Droxford, Soberton, Hambledon ===
Droxford, Soberton, Hambledon
Party	Candidate	Votes	%	±%
Conservative	Caroline Dibden	618	72.45	
Liberal Democrats	Robert Negus	161	18.87	
Labour	Paul Sony	65	7.62	
Majority		457	5.35	
Turnout		853	48.63	
Conservative hold		Swing		

=== Kings Worthy ===
Kings Worthy
Party	Candidate	Votes	%	±%
Liberal Democrats	Jane Rutter	829	48.11	
Conservative	Michael Short	500	29.01	
UKIP	Derek Smith	206	11.95	
Labour	Elaine Fullaway	109	6.32	
Independent	Ian Gordon	74	5.81	
Majority		329	19.09	
Turnout		1,723	48.26	
Liberal Democrats hold		Swing		

=== Oliver's Battery and Badger Farm ===
Oliver's Battery and Badger Farm
Party	Candidate	Votes	%	±%
Liberal Democrats	Patrick Fancett	850	50.41	
Conservative	Stephen Whittaker	489	29.00	
UKIP	Chris Barton-Briddon	208	12.33	
Labour	Taym Saleh	130	7.71	
Majority		361	21.41	
Turnout		1,686	51.01	
Liberal Democrats hold		Swing		

=== Owslebury and Curdridge ===
Owslebury and Curdridge
Party	Candidate	Votes	%	±%
Conservative	Laurence Ruffell	756	58.92	
UKIP	David Walbridge	263	20.49	
Liberal Democrats	Anne Stoneham	160	12.47	
Labour	Sheena King	95	7.40	
Majority		493	38.42	
Turnout		1,283	40.14	
Conservative hold		Swing		

=== Shedfield ===
Shedfield
Party	Candidate	Votes	%	±%
Conservative	Roger Huxstep	785	57.38	
UKIP	Ian Northgate	306	22.36	
Liberal Democrats	Simon Wernick	149	10.89	
Labour	Clive Coldwell	118	8.62	
Majority		479	35.01	
Turnout		1,368	42.42	
Conservative hold		Swing		

=== Sparsholt ===
Sparsholt
Party	Candidate	Votes	%	±%
Conservative	Caroline Horrill	482	67.03	
Liberal Democrats	Eleanor Bell	201	27.95	
Labour	Max Stafford	30	4.17	
Majority		281	39.08	
Turnout		719	46.48	
Conservative hold		Swing		

=== St Barnabas ===
St Barnabas
Party	Candidate	Votes	%	±%
Conservative	Helen Osborne	1,236	46.41	
Liberal Democrats	Susan Witt	1,095	41.11	
Labour	Edward Ferguson	247	9.27	
TUSC	Adam Freeman	53	1.99	
Majority		141	5.29	
Turnout		2,663	53.88	
Conservative gain from Liberal Democrats		Swing		

=== St Bartholomew ===
St Bartholomew
Party	Candidate	Votes	%	±%
Liberal Democrats	Charles Hiscock	838	37.56	
Conservative	Rosemary Burns	707	31.68	
Green	Michael Wilks	434	19.45	
Labour	Denis Archdeacon	233	10.44	
Majority		131	5.87	
Turnout		2,231	43.31	
Liberal Democrats hold		Swing		

=== St John and AllSaints ===
St John and All Saints
Party	Candidate	Votes	%	±%
Labour	Clive Gosling	710	41.74	
Conservative	Jonathan Scowen	383	22.51	
Liberal Democrats	John Higgins	362	21.28	
Independent	Adrian Hicks	232	13.63	
Majority		327	19.22	
Turnout		1,701	36.49	
Labour gain from Liberal Democrats		Swing		

=== St Luke ===
St Luke
Party	Candidate	Votes	%	±%
Liberal Democrats	Rosemary Prowse	655	41.85	
Conservative	Robert Menlove	365	23.32	
Labour	Andrew Adams	290	18.53	
UKIP	Ruth Smith	227	14.50	
TUSC	David Anderson	16	1.02	
Majority		290	18.53	
Turnout		1,565	35.40	
Liberal Democrats hold		Swing		

=== St Michael ===
St Michael
Party	Candidate	Votes	%	±%
Conservative	Ian Tait	1,127	52.03	
Liberal Democrats	Richard Coleman	583	26.91	
Labour	Caitlin O'Kelly	276	12.74	
UKIP	John Henderson	169	7.80	
Majority		544	25.11	
Turnout		2,166	37.95	
Conservative hold		Swing		

=== St Paul ===
St Paul
Party	Candidate	Votes	%	±%
Liberal Democrats	Lucille Thompson	848		
Conservative	Steve Russell	512		
Independent	Karen Barratt	433		
Labour	James Edwin Leppard	168		
Majority		336		
Turnout		1,961	41.64	
Liberal Democrats hold		Swing		

=== Swanmore & Newton ===
Swanmore & Newtown
Party	Candidate	Votes	%	±%
Conservative	Vicki Weston	1,078		
Liberal Democrats	Sheila Mary Campbell	311		
Labour	Laurence George Clough	154		
Majority		767		
Turnout		1543	45.57%	
Conservative hold		Swing		

=== The Alresfords ===
The Alresfords
Party	Candidate	Votes	%	±%
Liberal Democrats	Margot Power	1,177		
Conservative	Lisa Suzanne Griffiths	1,098		
Labour	Robin Vaughan Atkins	360		
Majority		79		
Turnout		2,635	52.02%	
Conservative hold		Swing		

=== Wonston & Micheldever ===
Wonston & Micheldever
Party	Candidate	Votes	%	±%
Conservative	Stephen Robert Godfrey	1,149		
Liberal Democrats	Katy Toms	462		
UKIP	Jocelyn Fortnum Derry Penn-Bull	270		
Labour	Antony Francis de Peyer	133		
Majority		687		
Turnout		2,014	45.33	
Conservative hold		Swing		
