= 2015 Winchester City Council election =

2015 UK local government election

← 2014	7 May 2015	2016 →

20 of the 57 seats to Winchester City Council 29 seats needed for a majority
	First party	Second party
Party	Conservative	Liberal Democrats
Seats before	28	25
Seats won	16	4
Seats after	33	22
Seat change	▲6	▼4
Popular vote	27,734	16,534
Percentage	49.11%	29.27%
- Results by Ward
Council control before election
No Overall Control
Council control after election
Conservative

The 2015 Winchester City Council election took place on 7 May 2015 to elect members of Winchester City Council in England. In total, 20 out of 57 council seats were up for election. The Conservatives gained majority control of Winchester City Council from No Overall Control, following the defection of two former Conservative councillors to the Liberal Democrats in 2014.

After the election, the composition of Winchester City Council was:

- Conservative 33
- Liberal Democrat 22
- Labour 2

== Election results ==
Winchester local election result 2015
Party	Seats	Gains	Losses	Net gain/loss	Seats %	Votes %	Votes	+/−
Conservative	16	6	0	+6	57.9	49.11	27,734	
Liberal Democrats	4	0	4	-4	38.6	29.27	16,534	
Labour	0	0	1	-1	3.5	9.04	5,109	
UKIP	0	0	0	0	0.0	5.89	3,331	
Green	0	0	0	0	0.0	4.08	2,307	
Independent	0	0	1	-1	0.0	1.54	871	

== Ward results ==
Bishop's Waltham
Party	Candidate	Votes	%	±%
Conservative	Tom Ruffell	1,674	42.2	
Independent	Colin Chamberlain	799	20.1	
Liberal Democrats	Roger Bentote	710	17.9	
UKIP	Vivienne Young	414	10.4	
Labour	Stephen Haines	353	8.9	
Majority		875	22.06	
Turnout		3,965	72.53	
Conservative gain from Independent		Swing		

Cheriton and Bishops Sutton
Party	Candidate	Votes	%	±%
Conservative	Amber Thacker	1,002	69.43	
Liberal Democrats	Christopher Day	317	21.96	
Labour	Tessa Valentine	118	8.17	
Majority		685	47.47	
Turnout		1,443	77.30	
Conservative hold		Swing		

Colden Common and Twyford
Party	Candidate	Votes	%	±%
Conservative	Susan Cook	1,410	42.44	
Liberal Democrats	Daryl Henry	1,243	37.41	
UKIP	Nigel Burwood	373	11.22	
Labour	Sarah Critcher	278	8.36	
Majority		167	5.02	
Turnout		3,322	75.20	
Conservative gain from Liberal Democrats		Swing		

Compton and Otterbourne
Party	Candidate	Votes	%	±%
Conservative	Jan Warwick	1,618	59.88	
Liberal Democrats	Eleanor Bell	780	28.86	
UKIP	Chris Barton-Briddon	161	5.95	
Labour	Margaret Rees	135	4.99	
Majority		838	31.01	
Turnout		2,702	80.15	
Conservative hold		Swing		

Denmead
Party	Candidate	Votes	%	±%
Conservative	Patricia Stallard	1,674	63.89	
UKIP	Leslie Mitchell	600	14.23	
Liberal Democrats	Margaret Scriven	539	12.78	
Labour	David Picton-Jones	361	8.56	
Majority		1,074	25.48	
Turnout		4,215	71.84	
Conservative hold		Swing		

Itchen Valley
Party	Candidate	Votes	%	±%
Conservative	Kim Gottlieb	1,023	79.42	
Liberal Democrats	Robin Rea	201	15.60	
Labour	Anthony De Peyer	55	4.27	
Majority		822	63.81	
Turnout		1,288	79.46	
Conservative hold		Swing		

Littleton and Harestock
Party	Candidate	Votes	%	±%
Conservative	Paul Twelftree	1,144	50.98	
Liberal Democrats	Kelsie Learney	931	41.48	
Labour	Peter Rees	156	6.95	
Majority		213	9.49	
Turnout		3,965	72.53	
Conservative gain from Liberal Democrats		Swing		

Owlesbury and Curdridge
Party	Candidate	Votes	%	±%
Conservative	Robert Humby	1,637	67.39	
Liberal Democrats	Tim Houghton	317	13.05	
UKIP	Mark Jones	285	11.73	
Labour	Steven Jakubowski	180	7.41	
Majority		1,320	54.34	
Turnout		2,429	75.60	
Conservative hold		Swing		

St Barnabas
Party	Candidate	Votes	%	±%
Conservative	Eileen Berry	1,752	47.51	
Liberal Democrats	Patricia Maier	1,234	33.46	
Green	Malcolm Perrins	339	9.19	
Labour	Stephen Haines	335	9.08	
Majority		518	14.04	
Turnout		3,687	75.90	
Conservative hold		Swing		

St Bartholomew
Party	Candidate	Votes	%	±%
Conservative	Rosemary Burns	1,474	40.55	
Liberal Democrats	Paul Williams	1,234	33.94	
Green	Michael Wilks	639	17.57	
Labour	Kathy East	335	9.08	
Majority		331	9.10	
Turnout		3,635	72.00	
Conservative gain from Liberal Democrats		Swing		

St John and All Saints
Party	Candidate	Votes	%	±%
Conservative	Jonathan Scowen	826	28.87	
Labour	Ben Farnes	722	25.23	
Liberal Democrats	Callum Kennard	585	20.44	
UKIP	Bob Barnes	347	12.12	
Green	James Peploe	292	10.20	
Independent	Adrian Hicks	72	2.51	
Majority		104	3.63	
Turnout		2,861	66.10	
Conservative gain from Labour		Swing		

St Luke
Party	Candidate	Votes	%	±%
Liberal Democrats	Jamie Scott	1,199	49.05	
Conservative	Ross Playle	645	26.39	
Labour	Max Stafford	354	14.48	
Green	Kia Robert Pope	238	9.73	
Majority		554	22.66	
Turnout		2,861	61.73	
Liberal Democrats hold		Swing		

St Michael
Party	Candidate	Votes	%	±%
Conservative	Fiona Mathers	1,814	49.49	
Liberal Democrats	Andrew Thompson	867	23.65	
Green	Julia Hallmann	419	11.43	
Labour	Sharon Montgomery	394	10.75	
UKIP	John Henderson	151	4.12	
Majority		947	25.83	
Turnout		3,665	75.10	
Conservative hold		Swing		

St Paul
Party	Candidate	Votes	%	±%
Liberal Democrats	Liz Hutchinson	1,316	40.36	
Conservative	Stephen Russell	1,091	33.46	
Green	Joshua Curgenven	380	11.65	
Labour	Carol Orchard	324	9.93	
UKIP	Derek Smith	134	4.11	
Majority		225	6.90	
Turnout		3,260	77.36	
Liberal Democrats hold		Swing		

Swanmore and Newtown
Party	Candidate	Votes	%	±%
Conservative	Frank Pearson	1,618	59.52	
Liberal Democrats	Sheila Campbell	550	20.23	
UKIP	Dan Paddock	329	12.10	
Labour	Laurence Clough	204	7.50	
Majority		1,068	39.29	
Turnout		2,718	77.70	
Conservative hold		Swing		

The Alresfords
Party	Candidate	Votes	%	±%
Conservative	Ernest Jeffs	2,075	52.79	
Liberal Democrats	Stephen Pinch	1,432	36.43	
Labour	Robin Atkins	393	10,00	
Majority		643	16.36	
Turnout		3,930	77.50	
Conservative hold		Swing		

Upper Meon Valley
Party	Candidate	Votes	%	±%
Conservative	Norma Bodtger	801	63.82	
Liberal Democrats	Anne Stoneham	215	16.97	
UKIP	Judith Clementson	138	10.99	
Labour	Gemma McKenna	97	7.72	
Majority		588	46.85	
Turnout		1,255	76.80	
Conservative hold		Swing		

Whiteley
Party	Candidate	Votes	%	±%
Liberal Democrats	Samantha Newman-McKie	748	45.16	
Conservative	Andrew Baker	659	39.79	
UKIP	David Walbridge	138	8.33	
Labour	Gary Gray	108	6.52	
Majority		875	5.37	
Turnout		1,656	68.61	
Liberal Democrats hold		Swing		

Wickham
Party	Candidate	Votes	%	±%
Liberal Democrats	Angela Clear	1,215	52.94	
Conservative	Caroline Brook	645	28.10	
UKIP	Ian Norgate	261	11.37	
Labour	Paul Sony	164	7.14	
Majority		570	24.83	
Turnout		2,295	69.40	
Liberal Democrats hold		Swing		

Wonston and Micheldever
Party	Candidate	Votes	%	±%
Conservative	Malcolm Wright	2,133	61.86	
Liberal Democrats	Kathryn Toms	994	28.82	
Labour	Peter Marsh	302	8.75	
Majority		875	22.06	
Turnout		3,448	77.43	
Conservative gain from Liberal Democrats		Swing		
