= 2007 Winchester City Council election =

2007 UK local government election

| ← 2006 | 2 May 2007 | 2008 → |

19 of 57 seats to Winchester City Council 29 seats needed for a majority
| | First party | Second party |
|---|---|---|
| Party | Conservative | Liberal Democrats |
| Seats before | 29 | 21 |
| Seats won | 10 | 8 |
| Seats after | 29 | 23 |
| Popular vote | 16,413 | 12,961 |
| Percentage | 50.3% | 39.8% |
| | Third party | Fourth party |
| Party | Labour | Independent |
| Seats before | 4 | 3 |
| Seats won | 0 | 1 |
| Seats after | 1 | 4 |
| Popular vote | 1,445 | 1,072 |
| Percentage | 4.4% | 3.3% |
- Results by Ward
Council control before election
Conservative
Council control after election
Conservative

The 2007 Winchester Council election took place on 3 May 2007 to elect members of Winchester District Council in Hampshire, England. One third of the council was up for election and the Conservative Party stayed in overall control of the council.

After the election, the composition of the council was:

- Conservative 29
- Liberal Democrat 23
- Independent 4
- Labour 1

== Campaign ==
19 seats were contested in the election with both the Conservatives and Liberal Democrats putting up candidates in all of the contested wards. Labour had 15 candidates, the United Kingdom Independence Party 6, Green Party 2 and there were 2 independents. The Labour leader on the council, Peter Rees, stood down at the election, while St Bartholomew ward had the first Muslim candidate for the council in the Conservative Abdul Kayum. Since the 2006 council election the Conservatives had controlled the council with a narrow majority.

Refuse collection was an important issue in the election, after the Conservative council planned to move from weekly to fortnightly collections in June for more of the council area including Swanmore, Whiteley and Wickham. They said this would boost recycling, but the Liberal Democrats said residents were against the move and that they would collect kitchen waste every week if they controlled the council.

== Election result ==
The results saw the Conservatives keep a majority on the council, with the party still having 29 seats. They gained one seat from the Liberal Democrats in Owslebury and Curdridge but lost one back in Compton and Otterbourne ward. Labour lost both of the seats they were defending on the council to leave the party with only 1 councillor. The beneficiaries were the Liberal Democrats who gained the seats in St Luke and St John and All Saints wards. The Liberal Democrats thus had 23 seats after the election, but had come within 19 votes of gaining a seat from the Conservatives in Whiteley ward, which would have deprived the Conservatives of a majority.

Winchester local election result 2007
| Party | Seats | Gains | Losses | Net gain/loss | Seats % | Votes % | Votes | +/− |
|---|---|---|---|---|---|---|---|---|
| Conservative | 10 | 1 | 1 | 0 | 52.6 | 50.3 | 16,413 | -3.5% |
| Liberal Democrats | 8 | 3 | 1 | +2 | 42.1 | 39.8 | 12,961 | +6.0% |
| Independent | 1 | 0 | 0 | 0 | 5.3 | 3.3 | 1,072 | -2.5% |
| Labour | 0 | 0 | 2 | -2 | 0 | 4.4 | 1,445 | -2.0% |
| UKIP | 0 | 0 | 0 | 0 | 0 | 1.5 | 501 | +1.3% |
| Green | 0 | 0 | 0 | 0 | 0 | 0.6 | 211 | +0.6% |

== Ward results ==
=== Bishop's Waltham ===
Bishop's Waltham
| Party | Candidate | Votes | % | ±% |
|---|---|---|---|---|
| Independent | Colin Chamberlain | 995 | 46.6 | +0.8 |
| Conservative | Charlie Wright | 793 | 37.1 | −6.1 |
| Liberal Democrats | Roy Stainton | 261 | 12.2 | +12.2 |
| Labour | Stephen Haines | 86 | 4.0 | −1.6 |
| Majority | | 202 | 9.5 | +6.9 |
| Turnout | | 2,135 | 41 | −1 |
| Independent hold | | Swing | | |

=== Colden Common and Twyford ===
Colden Common and Twyford
| Party | Candidate | Votes | % | ±% |
|---|---|---|---|---|
| Liberal Democrats | Jim Wagner | 1,280 | 59.0 | +7.7 |
| Conservative | Susan Evershed | 838 | 38.6 | −6.3 |
| Labour | Elaine Fullaway | 53 | 2.4 | −1.5 |
| Majority | | 442 | 20.4 | +14.0 |
| Turnout | | 2,171 | 53 | +6 |
| Liberal Democrats hold | | Swing | | |

=== Compton and Otterbourne ===
Compton and Otterbourne
| Party | Candidate | Votes | % | ±% |
|---|---|---|---|---|
| Liberal Democrats | Eleanor Bell | 861 | 50.4 | +7.7 |
| Conservative | Murray MacMillan | 753 | 44.1 | −5.3 |
| UKIP | Chris Barton-Briddon | 78 | 4.6 | −1.3 |
| Labour | Clare McKenna | 16 | 0.9 | −1.0 |
| Majority | | 108 | 6.3 | |
| Turnout | | 1,708 | 54 | |
| Liberal Democrats gain from Conservative | | Swing | | |

=== Denmead ===
Denmead
| Party | Candidate | Votes | % | ±% |
|---|---|---|---|---|
| Conservative | Patricia Stallard | 1,666 | 80.5 | −0.9 |
| Liberal Democrats | Anne Stoneham | 404 | 19.5 | +4.5 |
| Majority | | 1,262 | 61.0 | −5.4 |
| Turnout | | 2,070 | 40 | −1 |
| Conservative hold | | Swing | | |

=== Itchen Valley ===
Itchen Valley
| Party | Candidate | Votes | % | ±% |
|---|---|---|---|---|
| Conservative | Neil Baxter | 628 | 77.2 | +5.4 |
| Liberal Democrats | Andrew Thompson | 153 | 18.8 | −4.9 |
| UKIP | John Clark | 32 | 3.9 | +3.9 |
| Majority | | 475 | 58.4 | +10.3 |
| Turnout | | 813 | 52 | |
| Conservative hold | | Swing | | |

=== Littleton and Harestock ===
Littleton and Harestock
| Party | Candidate | Votes | % | ±% |
|---|---|---|---|---|
| Liberal Democrats | Kelsie Learney | 1,007 | 57.8 | +6.2 |
| Conservative | Patrick Cunningham | 704 | 40.4 | −4.5 |
| Labour | Tessa Valentine | 31 | 1.8 | −1.7 |
| Majority | | 303 | 17.4 | +10.7 |
| Turnout | | 1,742 | 63 | |
| Liberal Democrats hold | | Swing | | |

=== Owslebury and Curdridge ===
Owslebury and Curdridge
| Party | Candidate | Votes | % | ±% |
|---|---|---|---|---|
| Conservative | Robert Humby | 876 | 61.9 | +1.7 |
| Liberal Democrats | Ian Merritt | 498 | 35.2 | −1.6 |
| Labour | Brian Fullaway | 42 | 3.0 | 0.0 |
| Majority | | 378 | 26.7 | +3.3 |
| Turnout | | 1,416 | 47 | −2 |
| Conservative gain from Liberal Democrats | | Swing | | |

=== St. Barnabas ===
St. Barnabas
| Party | Candidate | Votes | % | ±% |
|---|---|---|---|---|
| Conservative | Eileen Berry | 1,230 | 49.6 | −3.1 |
| Liberal Democrats | Allan Mitchell | 1,069 | 43.1 | +0.2 |
| Green | Dave Walker-Nix | 109 | 4.4 | +4.4 |
| Labour | Adrien Field | 72 | 2.9 | −1.4 |
| Majority | | 161 | 6.5 | −3.3 |
| Turnout | | 2,480 | 52 | −3 |
| Conservative hold | | Swing | | |

=== St. Bartholomew ===
St. Bartholomew
| Party | Candidate | Votes | % | ±% |
|---|---|---|---|---|
| Liberal Democrats | Susan Nelmes | 1,142 | 54.4 | +5.0 |
| Conservative | Abdul Kayum | 787 | 37.5 | −6.4 |
| Labour | Timothy Curran | 93 | 4.4 | −2.3 |
| Independent | Rupert Pitt | 77 | 3.7 | +3.7 |
| Majority | | 355 | 16.9 | +11.4 |
| Turnout | | 2,099 | 45 | +2 |
| Liberal Democrats hold | | Swing | | |

=== St. John and All Saints ===
St. John and All Saints
| Party | Candidate | Votes | % | ±% |
|---|---|---|---|---|
| Liberal Democrats | Adrian Hicks | 757 | 43.3 | +12.5 |
| Conservative | Michael Lovegrove | 488 | 27.9 | −4.2 |
| Labour | Antony de Peyer | 443 | 25.3 | −7.4 |
| UKIP | Lawrence Hole | 61 | 3.5 | +3.5 |
| Majority | | 269 | 15.4 | |
| Turnout | | 1,749 | 38 | +3 |
| Liberal Democrats gain from Labour | | Swing | | |

=== St. Luke ===
St. Luke
| Party | Candidate | Votes | % | ±% |
|---|---|---|---|---|
| Liberal Democrats | Alexis Fall | 823 | 53.1 | +21.0 |
| Conservative | Robert Ducker | 515 | 33.2 | −9.9 |
| Labour | David Smith | 148 | 9.6 | −15.2 |
| UKIP | David Abbott | 63 | 4.1 | +4.1 |
| Majority | | 308 | 19.9 | |
| Turnout | | 1,549 | 38 | +3 |
| Liberal Democrats gain from Labour | | Swing | | |

=== St. Michael ===
St. Michael
| Party | Candidate | Votes | % | ±% |
|---|---|---|---|---|
| Conservative | Fiona Mather | 1,196 | 58.7 | 0.0 |
| Liberal Democrats | Susan Chesters | 680 | 33.4 | +0.2 |
| Labour | Albert Edwards | 98 | 4.8 | −0.3 |
| UKIP | Judith Gordon | 64 | 3.1 | +0.1 |
| Majority | | 516 | 25.3 | −0.2 |
| Turnout | | 2,038 | 45 | −2 |
| Conservative hold | | Swing | | |

=== St. Paul ===
St. Paul
| Party | Candidate | Votes | % | ±% |
|---|---|---|---|---|
| Liberal Democrats | Karen Barratt | 1,019 | 58.9 | +8.5 |
| Conservative | Robert Courts | 636 | 36.8 | −6.4 |
| Labour | Glenn Cope | 74 | 4.3 | −2.1 |
| Majority | | 383 | 22.1 | +14.9 |
| Turnout | | 1,729 | 39 | +0 |
| Liberal Democrats hold | | Swing | | |

=== Swanmore and Newton ===
Swanmore and Newtown
| Party | Candidate | Votes | % | ±% |
|---|---|---|---|---|
| Conservative | Frank Pearson | 1,217 | 76.6 | +20.4 |
| Liberal Democrats | Michael Toole | 371 | 23.4 | −17.7 |
| Majority | | 846 | 53.2 | +38.1 |
| Turnout | | 1,588 | 49 | −11 |
| Conservative hold | | Swing | | |

=== The Alresfords ===
The Alresfords
| Party | Candidate | Votes | % | ±% |
|---|---|---|---|---|
| Conservative | Ernie Jeffs | 1,271 | 54.7 | −4.6 |
| Liberal Democrats | Lucille Thompson | 693 | 29.8 | −5.6 |
| UKIP | David Samuel | 203 | 8.7 | +8.7 |
| Labour | Robin Atkins | 156 | 6.7 | +1.4 |
| Majority | | 578 | 24.9 | +1.0 |
| Turnout | | 2,323 | 48 | −3 |
| Conservative hold | | Swing | | |

=== Upper Meon Valley ===
Upper Meon Valley
| Party | Candidate | Votes | % | ±% |
|---|---|---|---|---|
| Conservative | Caroline Biggs | 679 | 79.1 | +9.8 |
| Liberal Democrats | Margaret Scriven | 179 | 20.9 | −5.5 |
| Majority | | 500 | 58.2 | +15.3 |
| Turnout | | 858 | 57 | |
| Conservative hold | | Swing | | |

=== Whiteley ===
Whiteley
| Party | Candidate | Votes | % | ±% |
|---|---|---|---|---|
| Conservative | Michael Anthony | 459 | 49.5 | −1.5 |
| Liberal Democrats | Vivian Achwal | 440 | 47.5 | +1.9 |
| Labour | Barry Jones | 28 | 3.0 | −0.4 |
| Majority | | 19 | 2.0 | −3.4 |
| Turnout | | 927 | 41 | |
| Conservative hold | | Swing | | |

=== Wickham ===
Wickham
| Party | Candidate | Votes | % | ±% |
|---|---|---|---|---|
| Liberal Democrats | Sue Fitzgerald | 809 | 61.1 | −4.7 |
| Conservative | Neil Jackson | 484 | 36.6 | +7.0 |
| Labour | Robert Rudge | 31 | 2.3 | −2.3 |
| Majority | | 325 | 24.5 | −11.7 |
| Turnout | | 1,324 | 44 | |
| Liberal Democrats hold | | Swing | | |

=== Wonston and Micheldever ===
Wonston and Micheldever
| Party | Candidate | Votes | % | ±% |
|---|---|---|---|---|
| Conservative | Malcolm Wright | 1,193 | 63.3 | −1.8 |
| Liberal Democrats | Simon Hobson | 515 | 27.3 | −3.6 |
| Green | Alison Craig | 102 | 5.4 | +5.4 |
| Labour | Nigel Lickley | 74 | 3.9 | 0.0 |
| Majority | | 678 | 36.0 | +1.8 |
| Turnout | | 1,884 | 45 | −3 |
| Conservative hold | | Swing | | |

| Preceded by 2006 Winchester Council election | Winchester local elections | Succeeded by 2008 Winchester Council election |
