= 2018 Winchester City Council election =

2018 UK local government election

- 3 May 2018

15 of the 45 seats to Winchester City Council 23 seats needed for a majority
	First party	Second party
Party	Conservative	Liberal Democrats
Seats before	25	20
Seats won	6	9
Seats after	23	22
Seat change	-2	+2
Popular vote	17,660	15,417
Percentage	47.2%	41.2%
- Map of the City of Winchester after the election. St Luke Ward is shown in white as it did not hold an election this year.
Council control before election
Conservative
Council control after election
Conservative

Elections to Winchester City Council took place on 3 May 2018. This was on the same day as other local elections across the United Kingdom.

== Results summary ==
Winchester City Council election, 2018
Party	Seats	Gains	Losses	Net gain/loss	Seats %	Votes %	Votes	+/−
Conservative	23	0	2	▼2		47.2	17,660	
Liberal Democrats	22	2	0	▲2		41.2	15,417	
Labour	0	0	0	Steady		9.0	3,360	
Green	0	0	0	Steady		2.5	924	
UKIP	0	0	0	Steady		0.1	52	

Composition of Wards after 2016 Election (left) and 2018 Election (right)

An election was not held this year in St Luke as it is a two-member ward, with both seats previously having been up for election with the 2016 Election, and one of the seats next up for the election in 2019. Colden Common and Twyford is similarly a two-member ward, but did hold an election this time.

== Ward results ==
=== Alresford & Itchen Valley ===
Alresford & Itchen Valley
Party	Candidate	Votes	%	±%
Liberal Democrats	Margot Julia Power	1,710	49.08	+6.45
Conservative	Irene Spencer	1,613	46.30	−3.30
Labour	Lee Arthur Hayes	161	4.62	−1.27
Majority		97	2.78	
Liberal Democrats gain from Conservative		Swing		

=== Badger Farm & Oliver's Battery ===
Badger Farm & Oliver's Battery
Party	Candidate	Votes	%	±%
Liberal Democrats	Brian Leslie Laming	1,630	50.40	+8.12
Conservative	John Royston Godbold	1,329	41.09	+0.38
Green	Max Priesemann	151	4.67	N/A
Labour	Neil Adrian Dolby	124	3.83	−2.65
Majority		301	9.31	
Liberal Democrats hold		Swing		

=== Bishops Waltham ===
Bishops Waltham
Party	Candidate	Votes	%	±%
Conservative	Steve Miller	1,650	74.86	+23.42
Labour	Steve Haines	554	25.14	+9.30
Majority		1,096	49.72	
Conservative hold		Swing		

=== Central Meon Valley ===
Central Meon Valley
Party	Candidate	Votes	%	±%
Conservative	Lind Eileen Elizabeth Gemmell	1,818	64.40	+13.00
Liberal Democrats	Sheila Mary Campbell	735	26.04	+2.38
Labour	Stan Evans	270	9.56	+0.03
Majority		1,083	38.36	
Conservative hold		Swing		

=== Colden Common & Twyford ===
Colden Common & Twyford
Party	Candidate	Votes	%	±%
Conservative	Sue J Cook	996	48.94	+7.48
Liberal Democrats	Hannah Elizabeth Williams	912	44.82	+14.44
Labour	Paul James Brown	127	6.24	−0.55
Majority		84	4.12	
Conservative hold		Swing		

=== Denmead ===
Denmead
Party	Candidate	Votes	%	±%
Conservative	Caroline Lorraine Brook	1,211	59.28	+1.22
Liberal Democrats	Judith Godwin	523	25.60	+4.44
Labour	Alexander Jon Graft	168	8.22	−10.69
Green	Ben Haysom-Newport	141	6.90	N/A
Majority		688	40.88	
Conservative hold		Swing		

=== Southwick & Wickham ===
Southwick & Wickham
Party	Candidate	Votes	%	±%
Liberal Democrats	Neil Richard Cutler	835	52.00	−0.02
Conservative	David Newberry	635	39.54	+15.36
Labour	Paul Thomas Sony	136	8.47	+3.24
Majority		200	12.46	
Liberal Democrats hold		Swing		

=== St Barnabas ===
St Barnabas
Party	Candidate	Votes	%	±%
Liberal Democrats	Anne Helen Weir	1,887	51.73	+10.36
Conservative	Paul Charles Twelftree	1,495	40.98	+1.44
Labour	Adrian John Paul Field	154	4.22	−4.58
Green	Robert Parker	112	3.07	N/A
Majority		392	10.75	
Liberal Democrats hold		Swing		

=== St Bartholomew ===
St Bartholomew
Party	Candidate	Votes	%	±%
Liberal Democrats	Kathleen Mary Becker	1,389	51.41	+23.90
Conservative	Paul Humm	701	25.94	+4.92
Labour	Philip Charles Ainsworth	384	14.21	−3.48
Green	David John Walker-Nix	176	6.51	−12.79
UKIP	Frances Baxter	52	1.92	−8.20
Majority		688	25.47	
Liberal Democrats hold		Swing		

=== St Michael ===
St Michael
Party	Candidate	Votes	%	±%
Liberal Democrats	Lynda Jane Murphy	1,262	44.67	+27.30
Conservative	Ian Donald Tait	1,083	38.34	+0.19
Labour	Charles James Richard Elderton	330	11.68	−13.24
Green	Jonathan Peter Hoare Lawrence	150	5.31	−7.59
Majority		179	6.33	
Liberal Democrats gain from Conservative		Swing		

=== St Paul ===
St Paul
Party	Candidate	Votes	%	±%
Liberal Democrats	Lucille Diane Thompson	1,402	54.81	+14.76
Conservative	Chris Hunt	703	27.48	−1.28
Labour	Catherine Mary Hutchinson	331	12.94	−6.77
Green	Andrew Karl Wainwright	122	4.77	−5.76
Majority		699	27.33	
Liberal Democrats hold		Swing		

=== The Worthys ===
The Worthys
Party	Candidate	Votes	%	±%
Liberal Democrats	Malcolm Prince	1,098	55.20	+4.91
Conservative	Tracey Louise Anderson	746	37.51	+6.73
Labour	Kimberly Jane Torkington	145	7.29	−3.16
Majority		352	17.69	
Liberal Democrats hold		Swing		

=== Upper Meon Valley ===
Upper Meon Valley
Party	Candidate	Votes	%	±%
Conservative	Laurence Ruffell	1,260	69.61	+13.00
Liberal Democrats	Simon Hugh Bult Cook	378	20.88	+3.00
Labour	June Elizabeth Kershaw	172	9.50	−5.52
Majority		882	48.73	
Conservative hold		Swing		

=== Whiteley & Shedfield ===
Whiteley & Shedfield
Party	Candidate	Votes	%	±%
Liberal Democrats	Roger Bentote	929	51.13	+10.42
Conservative	Jess Bond	725	39.90	+1.21
Labour	Laurie Clough	91	5.01	−1.15
Green	Anne Coleman	72	3.96	−4.21
Majority		204	11.23	
Liberal Democrats hold		Swing		

=== Wonston & Mitcheldever ===
Wonston & Mitcheldever
Party	Candidate	Votes	%	±%
Conservative	Patrick Brian Cunningham	1,695	64.33	+5.98
Liberal Democrats	Ian Alan James Gordon	727	27.59	+5.33
Labour	Andrew Timothy Adams	213	8.08	−6.69
Majority		968	36.74	
Conservative hold		Swing		

== By-elections ==
=== Upper Meon Valley ===
A by-election was held in Upper Meon Valley ward on 20 September 2018 after the resignation of Councillor Amber Tresahar.

Upper Meon Valley
Party	Candidate	Votes	%	±%
Conservative	Hugh Michael Rawson Lumby	1,039	51.59	−18.02
Liberal Democrats	Lewis John North	905	44.94	+24.06
Labour	June Elizabeth Kershaw	39	1.94	−7.46
Green	Andrew Karl Wainwright	31	1.54	N/A
Majority		134	6.65	
Conservative hold		Swing		
