= 2006 Winchester City Council election =

Council election overview in Winchester City

← 2004	4 May 2006	2007 →

19 of 57 seats to Winchester City Council 29 seats needed for a majority
	First party	Second party
Party	Conservative	Liberal Democrats
Seats before	22	26
Seats won	13	4
Seats after	29	21
Popular vote	17,604	11,047
Percentage	53.8%	33.8%
	Third party	Fourth party
Party	Labour	Independent
Seats before	5	4
Seats won	1	1
Seats after	4	3
Popular vote	2,100	1,898
Percentage	6.4%	5.8%
- Results by Ward
Council control before election
No overall control
Council control after election
Conservative

The 2006 Winchester Council election took place on 4 May 2006 to elect members of Winchester District Council in Hampshire, England. One third of the council was up for election and the Conservative Party gained overall control of the council from no overall control.

After the election, the composition of the council was:

- Conservative 29
- Liberal Democrat 21
- Independent 4
- Labour 3

== Campaign ==
Before the election the Liberal Democrats had 26 seats, the Conservatives 22, independents 5 and Labour 4. 19 seats were being contested with 4 Liberal Democrat and 1 independent councillors standing down at the election, while the council leader Sheila Campbell and 2 other cabinet members were defending seats.

Issues in the election included anti-social behaviour, council tax, rural transportation and planning policy.

== Election result ==
The count was disrupted delaying the last result after some of the ballot papers were set on fire meaning water had to be poured into the ballot box. The results saw the Conservatives take control of the council for the first time since the early 1990s. They gained 7 seats included 5 from the Liberal Democrats and 1 each from Labour and the independents. Conservatives defeated both the Liberal Democrat council leader Sheila Campbell and the Labour leader Patrick Davies.

The widespread press coverage earlier in the year about the local Liberal Democrat MP Mark Oaten having had sex with male prostitutes was seen as having damaged the Liberal Democrats and benefited the Conservatives. In the July after the election Oaten announced that he would be standing down from parliament at the next general election.

Following the election George Beckett became the new Conservative leader of the council.

Winchester local election result 2006
Party	Seats	Gains	Losses	Net gain/loss	Seats %	Votes %	Votes	+/−
Conservative	13	7	0	+7	68.4	53.8	17,604	+12.1
Liberal Democrats	4	0	5	-5	21.1	33.8	11,047	-8.3
Labour	1	0	1	-1	5.3	6.4	2,100	-1.0
Independent	1	0	1	-1	5.3	5.8	1,898	-0.1
UKIP	0	0	0	0	0.0	0.2	64	-2.6

== Ward results ==
=== Bishop's Waltham ===
Bishop's Waltham
Party	Candidate	Votes	%	±%
Independent	Georgina Busher	985	45.8	+0.6
Conservative	Roger Hockin	928	43.2	+16.9
Labour	Stephen Haines	120	5.6	+1.3
Independent	Ruby Forrest	117	5.4	+5.4
Majority		57	2.6	−16.3
Turnout		2,150	42	
Independent hold		Swing		

=== Cheriton & Bishops Sutton ===
Cheriton & Bishops Sutton
Party	Candidate	Votes	%	±%
Conservative	Harry Verney	565	62.6	+10.1
Liberal Democrats	Christopher Day	338	37.4	−7.5
Majority		227	25.2	+17.6
Turnout		903	53	
Conservative hold		Swing		

=== Colden Common and Twyford ===
Colden Common and Twyford
Party	Candidate	Votes	%	±%
Liberal Democrats	Richard Izard	971	51.3	−10.1
Conservative	Theresa Marshall	850	44.9	+12.3
Labour	Tessa Valentine	73	3.9	−2.2
Majority		121	6.4	−22.4
Turnout		1,894	47	
Liberal Democrats hold		Swing		

=== Denmead ===
Denmead
Party	Candidate	Votes	%	±%
Conservative	Frederick Allgood	1,742	81.4	+9.6
Liberal Democrats	Thomas Houghton	320	15.0	−9.3
Labour	David Picton-Jones	78	3.6	−0.4
Majority		1,422	66.4	+18.9
Turnout		2,140	41	
Conservative hold		Swing		

=== Droxford, Soberton and Hambledon ===
Droxford, Soberton and Hambledon
Party	Candidate	Votes	%	±%
Conservative	Antony Coates	740	78.5	+10.0
Liberal Democrats	Margaret Scriven	203	21.5	−8.2
Majority		537	57.0	+18.2
Turnout		943	59	
Conservative hold		Swing		

=== Kings Worthy ===
Kings Worthy
Party	Candidate	Votes	%	±%
Conservative	Stanley Howell	799	51.0	+9.6
Liberal Democrats	Hilary Jones	697	44.5	−0.6
Labour	Elaine Fullaway	70	4.5	−0.6
Majority		102	6.5	
Turnout		1,566	49	
Conservative gain from Liberal Democrats		Swing		

=== Olivers Battery & Badger Farm ===
Olivers Battery & Badger Farm
Party	Candidate	Votes	%	±%
Liberal Democrats	Brian Colin	837	48.7	−9.2
Conservative	Susan Evershed	829	48.2	+11.1
Labour	David Smith	53	3.1	−1.9
Majority		8	0.5	−20.3
Turnout		1,719	54	
Liberal Democrats hold		Swing		

=== Owslebury & Curdridge ===
Owslebury & Curdridge
Party	Candidate	Votes	%	±%
Conservative	Laurence Ruffell	881	60.2	+15.9
Liberal Democrats	Roy Stainton	539	36.8	−16.0
Labour	Brian Fullaway	44	3.0	+0.1
Majority		342	23.4	
Turnout		1,464	49	
Conservative gain from Liberal Democrats		Swing		

=== Shedfield ===
Shedfield
Party	Candidate	Votes	%	±%
Conservative	Roger Huxstep	649	44.5	+0.7
Independent	Andrew Archard	554	38.0	−11.9
Independent	Stuart Jones	173	11.9	+11.9
Labour	Patricia Hayward	82	5.6	−0.7
Majority		95	6.5	
Turnout		1,458	47	
Conservative gain from Independent		Swing		

=== Sparsholt ===
Sparsholt
Party	Candidate	Votes	%	±%
Conservative	Keith Wood	484	62.0	+13.3
Liberal Democrats	Richard Coleman	297	38.0	−13.3
Majority		187	24.0	
Turnout		781	52	
Conservative gain from Liberal Democrats		Swing		

=== St. Barnabas ===
St. Barnabas
Party	Candidate	Votes	%	±%
Conservative	Richard Worrall	1,350	52.7	+3.7
Liberal Democrats	Allan Mitchell	1,099	42.9	−1.4
Labour	Adrian Field	111	4.3	−2.4
Majority		251	9.8	+5.1
Turnout		2,560	55	
Conservative gain from Liberal Democrats		Swing		

=== St. Bartholomew ===
St. Bartholomew
Party	Candidate	Votes	%	±%
Liberal Democrats	Dominic Hiscock	978	49.4	+2.8
Conservative	Patrick Cunningham	869	43.9	+8.9
Labour	Timothy Curran	133	6.7	−3.4
Majority		109	5.5	−6.1
Turnout		1,980	43	
Liberal Democrats hold		Swing		

=== St. John and All Saints ===
St. John and All Saints
Party	Candidate	Votes	%	±%
Labour	Chris Pines	507	32.7	+3.4
Conservative	Michael Lovegrove	498	32.1	+6.8
Liberal Democrats	Adrian Hicks	478	30.8	−1.8
Independent	Harold Robbins	69	4.4	+4.4
Majority		9	0.6	
Turnout		1,552	35	
Labour hold		Swing		

=== St. Luke ===
St. Luke
Party	Candidate	Votes	%	±%
Conservative	James Stephens	614	43.1	+5.9
Liberal Democrats	Simon Hobson	458	32.1	−10.4
Labour	Patrick Davies	354	24.8	+4.5
Majority		156	11.0	
Turnout		1,426	35	
Conservative gain from Labour		Swing		

=== St. Michael ===
St. Michael
Party	Candidate	Votes	%	±%
Conservative	Ian Tait	1,240	58.7	+18.0
Liberal Democrats	Susan Chester	702	33.2	−10.7
Labour	Albert Edwards	107	5.1	+1.2
UKIP	Judith Napier-Clark	64	3.0	−4.0
Majority		538	25.5	
Turnout		2,113	47	
Conservative hold		Swing		

=== St. Paul ===
St. Paul
Party	Candidate	Votes	%	±%
Liberal Democrats	Raymond Pearce	845	50.4	−6.0
Conservative	Gillian Allen	725	43.2	+9.5
Labour	Debra Grech	108	6.4	−3.5
Majority		120	7.2	−15.5
Turnout		1,678	39	
Liberal Democrats hold		Swing		

=== Swanmore and Newton ===
Swanmore and Newtown
Party	Candidate	Votes	%	±%
Conservative	Victoria Weston	1,101	56.2	+0.9
Liberal Democrats	Sheila Campbell	805	41.1	−0.8
Labour	Dennis May	52	2.7	−0.1
Majority		296	15.1	+1.7
Turnout		1,958	60	
Conservative gain from Liberal Democrats		Swing		

=== The Alresfords ===
The Alresfords
Party	Candidate	Votes	%	±%
Conservative	George Hollingbery	1,469	59.3	+18.3
Liberal Democrats	Jacqueline Porter	876	35.4	−7.4
Labour	Robin Atkins	131	5.3	−1.5
Majority		593	23.9	
Turnout		2,476	51	
Conservative hold		Swing		

=== Wonston and Micheldever ===
Wonston and Micheldever
Party	Candidate	Votes	%	±%
Conservative	Stephen Godfrey	1,271	65.1	+7.4
Liberal Democrats	Peter McLoughlin	604	30.9	−6.9
Labour	Nigel Lickley	77	3.9	−0.5
Majority		667	34.2	+14.3
Turnout		1,952	48	
Conservative hold		Swing		

Preceded by 2004 Winchester Council election	Winchester local elections	Succeeded by 2007 Winchester Council election
