= List of places of worship in the Borough of Havant =

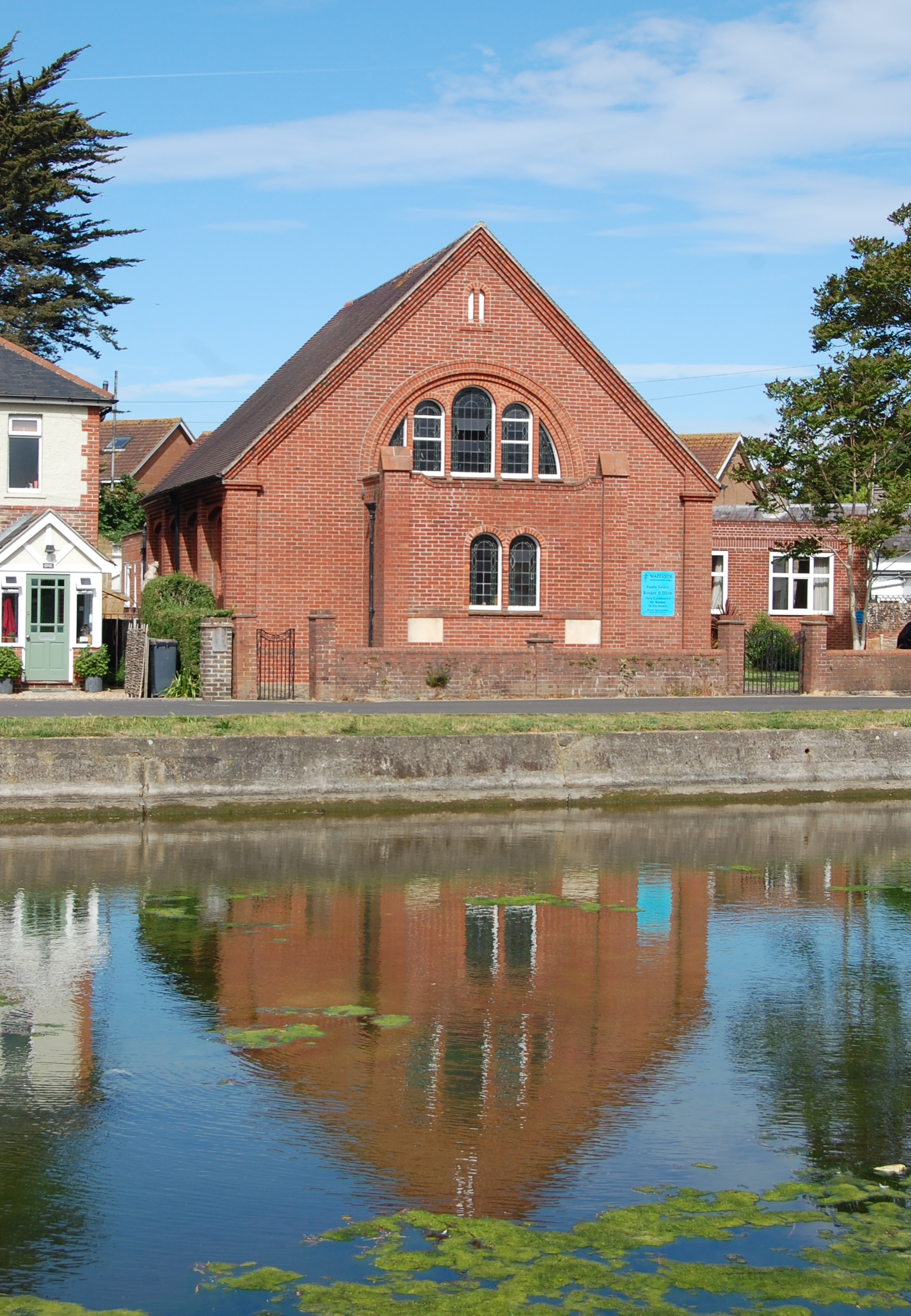
Waterside United Reformed Church at Emsworth was built in 1929.

There are more than 50 current and former places of worship in the borough of Havant in Hampshire, England. Various Christian denominations own and use 42 churches, chapels and meeting halls across the borough, and there is also a meeting place for Hindus; and 10 other buildings no longer function as places of worship but survive in alternative uses. Havant is one of 13 local government districts in the county of Hampshire—a large county in central southern England, with a densely populated coastal fringe facing the English Channel and a more rural hinterland. The borough of Havant occupies the southeastern corner of Hampshire and is mostly urban. The towns of Havant, Emsworth and Waterlooville merge into each other, incorporating older villages such as Bedhampton and Warblington and forming a "long sprawl of inter- and postwar development [along] the London road out of Portsmouth". Hayling Island is mostly rural but has some 20th-century suburban development. Some ancient Church of England parish churches survive in the old villages, supplemented by others of the Victorian era and later; alongside these, there is a range of churches and chapels for other denominations, mostly built in the 20th and 21st centuries.

The 2011 United Kingdom census reported that the majority of residents are Christian. The largest number of churches in Havant belong to the Church of England—the country's Established Church. Roman Catholicism and the main strands of Protestant Nonconformism—Methodism, Baptists and the United Reformed Church—are also well represented with churches of their own. Several smaller religious groups also have their own places of worship, including Spiritualists, Jehovah's Witnesses and Plymouth Brethren.

Historic England has awarded listed status to seven current and two former places of worship in Havant borough. Buildings of "special architectural or historic interest" are placed on a statutory list by Historic England, a Government body. Buildings of Grade I status (held by two churches in the borough) are defined as being of "exceptional interest"; two other churches are listed at Grade II*, used for "particularly important buildings of more than special interest"; and Grade II, a status held by three active and two former churches, is used for buildings of "special interest".

== Overview of the borough and its places of worship ==
The borough is located in the southeast of Hampshire.

The first Christian churches in the area were founded during the Saxon era. One was on Hayling Island, but it was destroyed by flooding and erosion in the Middle Ages and its site is unknown. The tower of St Thomas à Becket Church at Warblington is partly Anglo-Saxon. In Havant town, no church was recorded in the Domesday Book but by the late 12th century there was "a sizeable ... church with a central tower", of which some structural evidence remains. St Peter's Church and St Mary's Church on Hayling Island date from the late 12th or early 13th century and the mid-13th century respectively; at that time most of the island was owned by Jumièges Abbey in Normandy. Also of ancient origin is St Thomas's Church at Bedhampton, where the chancel arch dates from about 1140.

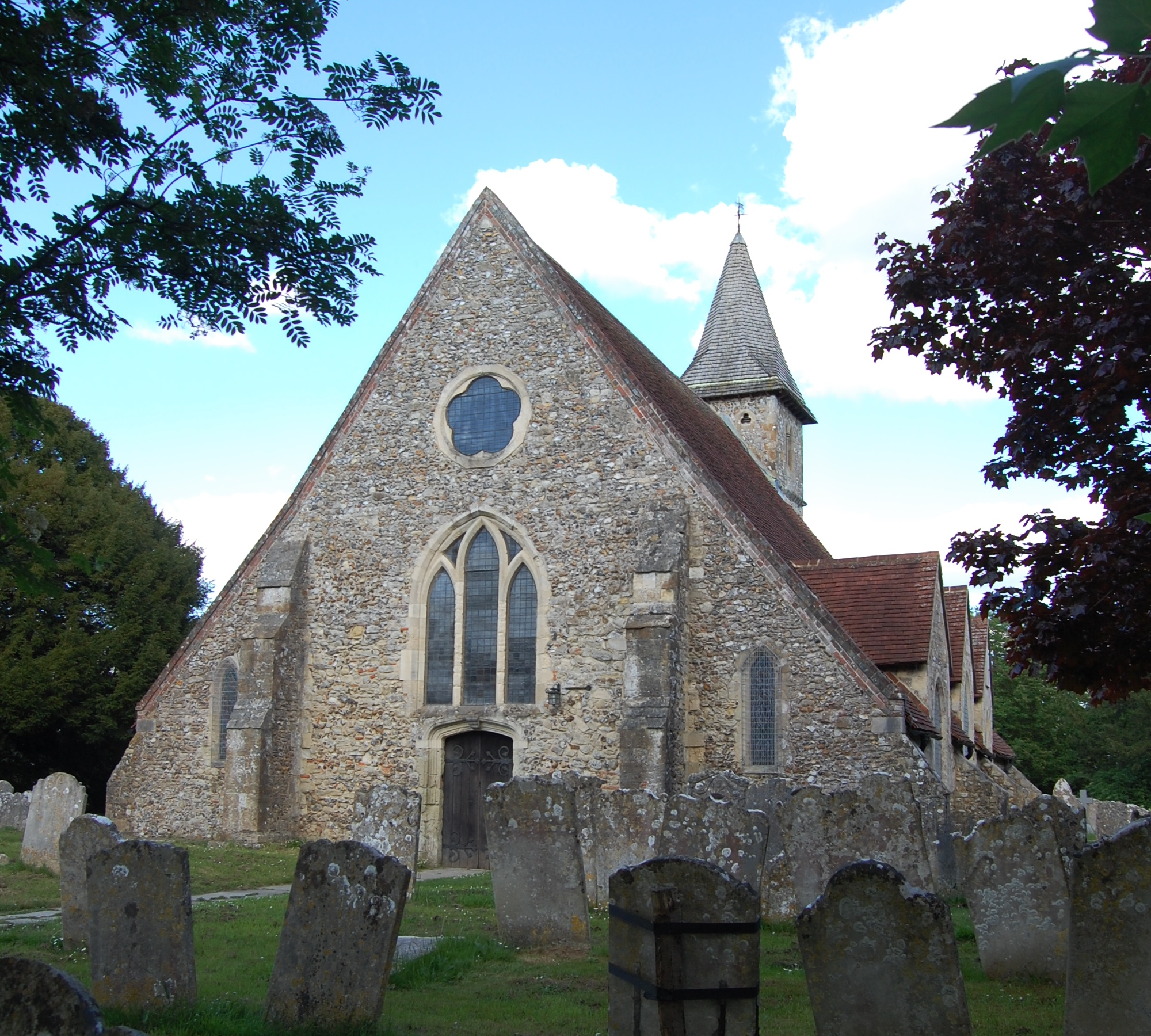
Warblington parish church is almost entirely 12th–13th-century, although the east window dates from 1893 and the round window above was installed in 1909.

The next period of churchbuilding came during the Victorian era, by which time the Church of England (Anglican church) was England's established church. Emsworth, the main settlement in Warblington parish, became a separate parish in the 1840s when St James's Church was built (replacing a small chapel of ease on the town square). Population growth in the large parish of Farlington, (Note: Now part of the city of Portsmouth.) which in the 19th century covered the villages of Waterlooville and Purbrook, prompted the construction of St George's Church (1830) and St John the Baptist (1843) respectively in those places. Meanwhile, the ancient parish churches were subject to various degrees of restoration at this time. E.A. Gruning extended and transformed the appearance of Bedhampton church in 1869 and 1878; George Edmund Street and Arthur Blomfield's three rounds of alterations at St Mary's on Hayling Island were "fairly thorough but conservative"; architect Francis Bacon undertook a modest programme of work at St Peter's Church on the island in the 1880s; and St Faith's in Havant was largely rebuilt. In contrast, Warblington's parish church saw little alteration: the main 19th-century addition was a pair of grave-watchers' huts in the churchyard, prompted by the prevalence of body snatching at that time. Two mission chapels associated with St Faith were also founded during this era. Langstone Mission Church, now dedicated to St Nicholas, was built by a churchwarden at St Faith's: it was attached to his house, Langstone Towers, but has always been available for public worship. The Brockhampton Mission Church, a tin tabernacle, was erected in 1874 and served that part of Havant for about a century until it was demolished.

In the 20th century, the rapid growth of population as the area became heavily urbanised resulted in the construction of more Anglican churches. St Wilfrid's Church opened in 1924 to serve Cowplain, which was then an outlying part of the parish of Catherington; the Eastoke area of Hayling Island had its own church from 1964, when St Andrew's opened; and churches were built in 1962, 1967 and 1970 to serve the central, West Leigh and Warren Park areas respectively of the vast Leigh Park council estate. Also in 1970, St George's Church at Waterlooville was rebuilt in larger form to replace its 140-year-old predecessor.

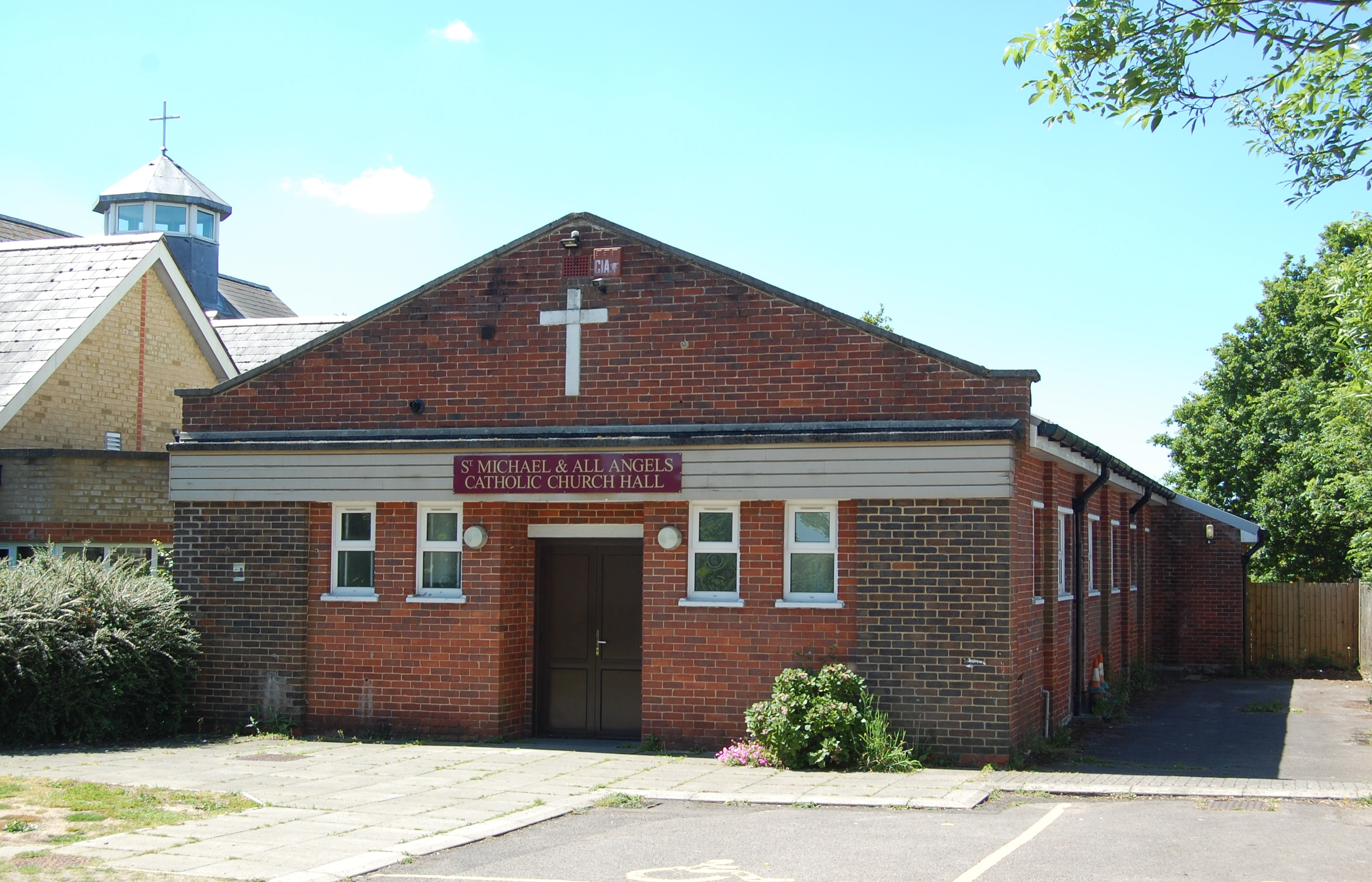
Leigh Park's first Catholic church, now a church hall, was built in 1955 and dedicated to Blessed Margaret Pole.

Havant was "one of five ancient centres of Catholicism in Hampshire, with an unbroken history" during the centuries when penal law applied. Accordingly, it was "the centre of Catholic worship for a large area" in the era before emancipation. Many members of the local landed gentry were Catholics, and proximity to the English Channel meant that visiting priests from Europe could easily come to serve worshippers and then escape quickly if necessary. A Catholic mission with a permanent priest was founded in about 1711 at Langstone, and in 1752 a permanent chapel was built in Brockhampton. (Note: An area in the west of Havant parish, close to Bedhampton.) This was hidden behind "a very substantially built house" and included a space for the priest to hide. For many years the chapel served worshippers across a large area covering Chichester, Fareham, Portsmouth and Gosport. St Joseph's Church on West Street replaced it in 1875, and after World War II chapels of ease (later parish churches in their own right) were founded at Emsworth and Leigh Park. Emsworth's church opened in 1959 after several years in which Mass was celebrated in a hall. After Emsworth became a separate parish, its priest began to hold services in private houses and a Nissen hut on the Leigh Park estate, then in 1955 a small church (now the church hall) was built in the middle of the estate. He also bought land for a second church to serve the eastern part of Leigh Park and Rowland's Castle, (Note: A village in the neighbouring district of East Hampshire.) but nothing came of this. On Hayling Island, land for a Catholic church was bought in 1914 and a building opened in July of that year, but the present St Patrick's Church did not open until 1925. In Waterlooville, a convent was founded in 1889 for the Sisters of Our Lady of Charity, and a chapel was added in 1923. The Bishop of Portsmouth William Cotter asked the architect W.C. Mangan to make it suitable for public worship as well, so he designed "an extraordinary echelon plan of three naves"—one for parishioners and the other two to be used by the convent. This was replaced by a larger church in 2010–11.

Primitive Methodists were active in the area in the 1870s, founding chapels at Bedhampton (1875), Emsworth (1876) and Purbrook (1879). Followers of Wesleyan Methodism opened a chapel of their own in Havant in 1888. A new chapel at Purbrook opened in 1932, just before the Methodist Union brought the two groups together. A replacement chapel was built at Emsworth by 1939; then in 1956 a new Methodist church was built on the developing Leigh Park estate, and in 1958 replacement churches were built in both Bedhampton and Havant town. The late-1960s church building at Hart Plain is also used by Methodists jointly with the Church of England. The Methodist churches at Leigh Park and Purbrook closed in the early 21st century.

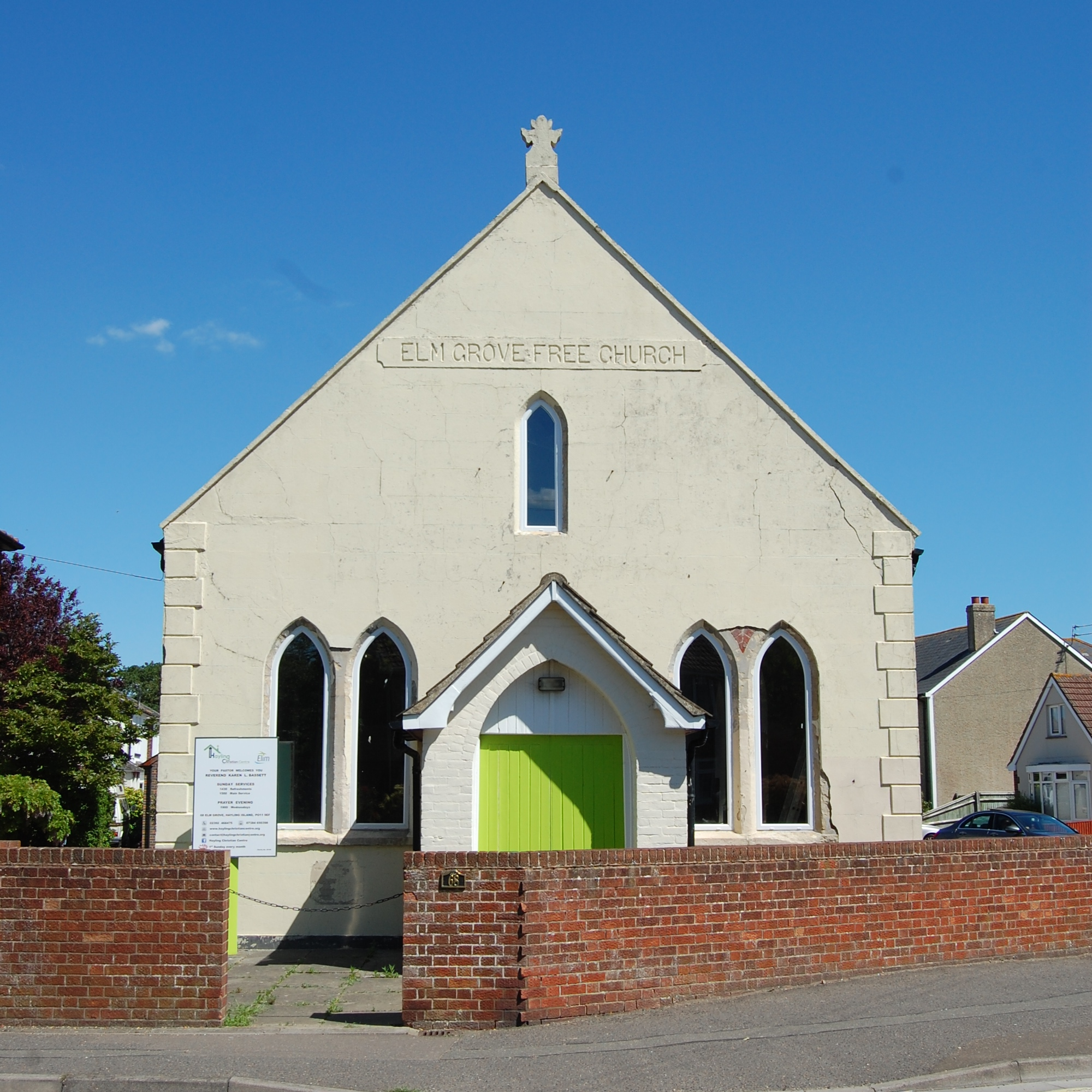
The name elm grove free church is still visible on the building now used as Hayling Island's Elim Pentecostal church.

Postwar Baptist churches are found in Leigh Park (1960), Waterlooville (1967), Hayling Island (2012) (Note: Shared with an Anglican congregation.) and Emsworth (2015), but two have much older origins. Baptist worship in Emsworth dates back to 1848, and the chapel which replaced the original building still stands alongside its much larger 21st-century replacement—a combined church and community facility. Waterlooville's complex of Baptist chapel, Sunday school building and institute disappeared during the wholesale redevelopment of the town centre in the 1960s; its replacement, north of town on the London Road, has been praised for its "simple, elegant [and] finely proportioned" form.

Congregationalism in the Havant area has a 300-year history: a meeting was founded in Havant in 1719, and nine years later a chapel was built on The Pallant. Architecturally distinctive, it has been called "the only notable Nonconformist building surviving" in the Portsmouth and south Hampshire area from the pre-Victorian era, although it is no longer in religious use: it was superseded by the present Havant United Reformed Church (Note: The United Reformed Church denomination was formed from the amalgamation of the Congregational Church and the Presbyterian Church of England in 1972.) in 1891. Since May 2019 this has been part of a joint congregation with Emsworth United Reformed Church, whose origins lie in a mid-19th-century chapel. Congregational chapels opened in South Hayling (1830; replaced in 1954 after war damage) and North Hayling (1874) in the 19th century; both were in use until 1991, when the North Hayling church closed.

Various other Christian groups are represented throughout the borough. Churches of an Evangelical character are found on the Leigh Park and Wecock Farm estates; at Cowplain, where an Evangelical mission hall was founded in the early 20th century; and in a shopping centre in Havant town centre. A Pentecostal church on Hayling Island occupies the former Elm Grove Free Church, registered as an "unsectarian Gospel mission hall" in 1897. Spiritualists, Jehovah's Witnesses and the Plymouth Brethren Christian Church are also represented. A Hindu group also has premises in Havant town.

Large parts of the borough's land were used by Portsmouth City Council to house people displaced from homes destroyed by bombing in World War II—the Leigh Park and Wecock Farm estates were both developed for this purpose—and several churches have Portsmouth connections. The postwar Methodist churches at Bedhampton and Leigh Park (Note: No longer in Methodist use.) were funded by War Damage Commission compensation payments in respect of the destruction of two Methodist churches in Portsmouth, at Arundel Street and Stamford Street respectively. Trustees of the former Bible Christian chapel at Albert Road donated money to the new Havant Methodist Church in 1958, while Purbrook Methodist Church received £4,000 from the sale of a chapel in Powerscourt Road, North End, and was given the organ from Brougham Road church in Southsea. The foundation stone from the bombed Lake Road Baptist Chapel in Portsmouth (the largest in Southern England, with a capacity of 1,800) was retrieved and built into the wall at Leigh Park Baptist Church.

== Religious affiliation ==
According to the 2011 United Kingdom census, 120,684 lived in the borough of Havant. Of these, 59.22% identified themselves as Christian, 0.47% were Muslim, 0.22% were Buddhist, 0.19% were Hindu, 0.07% were Jewish, 0.05% were Sikh, 0.47% followed another religion, 32.25% claimed no religious affiliation and 7.05% did not state their religion. The proportion of people in the borough who followed no religion was higher than the figure in England as a whole (24.74%); adherence to Christianity was similar (in 2011 59.38% of people were Christian); and Islam, Judaism, Hinduism, Sikhism and Buddhism all had a lower following than in the country overall (at census date 5.02% of people were Muslim, 1.52% were Hindu, 0.79% were Sikh, 0.49% were Jewish and 0.45% were Buddhist).

== Administration ==
=== Anglican churches ===
All Anglican churches in the borough are part of the Anglican Diocese of Portsmouth, which is based at Portsmouth Cathedral. The diocese has seven deaneries plus the cathedral's own separate deanery. The Havant Deanery is responsible for all the borough's parish churches: at Bedhampton (St Nicholas and St Thomas), Cowplain (St Wilfrid and Hart Plain Church), Emsworth, Havant town, Hayling Island (St Andrew, St Mary and St Peter), Langstone, Leigh Park (St Alban, St Clare and St Francis), Purbrook (the Good Shepherd and St John the Baptist), Warblington and Waterlooville.

=== Roman Catholic churches ===
The Catholic churches at Emsworth, Havant town, Hayling Island, Leigh Park and Waterlooville are within Deanery 5 and the Havant Pastoral Area of the Roman Catholic Diocese of Portsmouth, whose seat is the Cathedral of St John the Evangelist in Portsmouth. St Joseph's Church in Havant town and the Church of St Thomas of Canterbury and St Thomas More at Emsworth are in the parish of Havant; this extends to the West Sussex and Portsmouth city boundaries and also covers Bedhampton and Langstone. The parish of Hayling Island is represented by St Patrick's Church and covers the whole island. The parish of St Michael and All Angels Church at Leigh Park covers all parts of the Leigh Park estate and extends to Rowland's Castle in the neighbouring district of East Hampshire. Waterlooville's parish church of the Sacred Heart and St Peter is now the only church in the large parish of Waterlooville, which extends to Purbrook, Widley and Cowplain in Havant borough and the southeast corner of Winchester district (Denmead, Hambledon and surrounding areas). The Diocese opened two chapels of ease in the parish in Purbrook and Cowplain in the 1970s, but both were closed in the 1990s.

=== Other denominations ===
The borough's four Methodist churches—at Bedhampton, Emsworth, Hart Plain and Havant—are part of the 23-church East Solent and Downs Methodist Circuit. Emsworth, Hayling Island, Leigh Park and Waterlooville Baptist Churches belong to the Southern Counties Baptist Association. Bethel Evangelical Free Church in Leigh Park is part of three Evangelical groups: GraceNet UK, an association of Reformed Evangelical Christian churches and organisations; the Fellowship of Independent Evangelical Churches (FIEC), a pastoral and administrative network of about 500 churches with an evangelical outlook; and Affinity (formerly the British Evangelical Council), a network of conservative Evangelical congregations throughout Great Britain. Cowplain Evangelical Church is also a member of FIEC. Havant Spiritualist Church belongs to the Spiritualists' National Union and is within the organisation's Southern District, which covers Hampshire, the Isle of Wight, Dorset and Wiltshire.

== Listed status ==
Grade	Criteria
Grade I	Buildings of exceptional interest, sometimes considered to be internationally important.
Grade II*	Particularly important buildings of more than special interest.
Grade II	Buildings of national importance and special interest.

Two churches in the borough are Grade I-listed, two have Grade II* status and five (including two former churches) are listed at Grade II. As of February 2001, there were 239 listed buildings in the borough of Havant: 2 with Grade I status, 5 listed at Grade II* and 232 with Grade II status. In England, a building or structure is defined as "listed" when it is placed on a statutory register of buildings of "special architectural or historic interest" by the Secretary of State for Digital, Culture, Media and Sport, a Government department, in accordance with the Planning (Listed Buildings and Conservation Areas) Act 1990. Historic England, a non-departmental public body, acts as an agency of this department to administer the process and advise the department on relevant issues.

Historic England also publishes an annual "Heritage at Risk Register"—a survey of assets at risk through decay, damage and similar issues. In the latest update, St Faith's Church in Havant town was identified as being at risk because of the deteriorating condition of the roof.

== Current places of worship ==
Current places of worship
Name	Image	Location	Denomination/ Affiliation	Grade	Notes	Refs
St Thomas's Church (More images)		Bedhampton; 50.853019°N 1.003343°W	Anglican	II	A church was recorded in Bedhampton in the Domesday Book, but no trace survives. The present building has 12th-century origins, but the bell-cote and wooden porch date from 1869 to 1870 and the vestry was extended in 1993. Parts of the chancel arch—the church's "finest feature"—are original, and some 14th-century work remains (including several windows). In particular, the chancel appears to have been extended in the second half of that century. The walls are of flint and rubble.	
St Nicholas' Church (More images)		Bedhampton; 50.856044°N 1.003665°W	Anglican	–	The second church in Bedhampton parish was acquired in 1950; the building had previously been used at a local naval camp. In 1959 it was extended to its present form and formally dedicated.	
Kingdom Hall (More images)		Bedhampton; 50.854980°N 0.991633°W	Jehovah's Witnesses	–	The Havant Congregation and the Emsworth Congregation of Jehovah's Witnesses worship at this Kingdom Hall next to the West Coastway railway line. It was registered for marriages in August 1976 and built entirely by a volunteer workforce.	
Bedhampton Methodist Church (More images)		Bedhampton; 50.857860°N 1.002249°W	Methodist	–	Bedhampton's first Methodist chapel stood next to the railway station and was built in 1875 or 1878 for Primitive Methodists, although it was not registered for marriages for another 25 years. It was a brick building with a capacity of 120. The present church stands on a different site and opened in 1958.	
St Wilfrid's Church (More images)		Cowplain; 50.895895°N 1.014368°W	Anglican	–	Cowplain was in the parish of Catherington, a village several miles away, and residents had to worship there at All Saints Church until 1924 when St Wilfrid's was completed and opened (it was dedicated by the Bishop of Southampton Cecil Boutflower in April of that year). Work had begun in late 1923, two years after the Bishop had authorised the building of the church. The cost of construction was £2,450; the site, part of the Clarke-Jervoise baronets' ancient Idsworth estate, had cost £700 but was donated as a gift. St Wilfrid's remained a chapel of ease to Catherington until 1929 when it was parished.	
Cowplain Evangelical Church (More images)		Cowplain; 50.894982°N 1.019193°W	Evangelical	–	This building replaced the Evangelical Free church nearby on London Road which dated from the early 20th century. It was registered for worship and the solemnisation of marriages in January 1968.	
Brethren Meeting Room (More images)		Cowplain; 50.897909°N 1.016474°W	Plymouth Brethren Christian Church	–	Planning permission for construction of this meeting room at the junction of London Road and Longwood Avenue was granted in July 1982.	
St James's Church (More images)		Emsworth; 50.849104°N 0.938278°W	Anglican	II	Emsworth was historically in the parish of Warblington and had no church until a chapel of ease dedicated to St Peter opened in 1790 in the main square. Its replacement on a site to the north dates from 1839 to 1840 and was designed by Chichester-based architect John Elliott, although John Colson made additions in 1857–58 and 1865 and Arthur Blomfield extended the church to its present dimensions in 1892. A separate parish was formed in 1841. The flint and stone church is in the Neo-Norman style.	
Emsworth Baptist Church (More images)		Emsworth; 50.848025°N 0.936713°W	Baptist	–	Emsworth's first Baptist chapel was erected in 1848. It was succeeded by another building on North Street, which was in turn replaced by the present church and community building of 2015 designed by the architecture firm Haverstock. A small tower of the same dark grey brick as the rest of the church, accented by reflective panelling, rises at the northwest corner, but the building is otherwise low and spreads across the corner site. The church was registered in October 2015. The old chapel is now the church hall.	
Emsworth Methodist Church (More images)		Emsworth; 50.846291°N 0.936849°W	Methodist	–	Primitive Methodists founded a chapel in Emsworth in 1876. The present church, a brick building with a capacity of 200 when it opened, stands on the central square in the town and was registered in March 1939.	
St Thomas's Church (More images)		Emsworth; 50.853208°N 0.937152°W	Roman Catholic	–	Emsworth's Catholics travelled to Havant for Mass until Havant's new priest established a Mass centre at the British Legion Hall in 1950. Work began on the present church, dedicated in full to St Thomas of Canterbury and St Thomas More, in May 1959 and it was dedicated in December of that year. Construction cost £10,000; the architect is not known. The red-brick, gable-fronted building has full-length bands of stained glass windows along the sides and a large window in a similar style above the entrance. The interior has no subdivisions.	
Waterside United Reformed Church (More images)		Emsworth; 50.847184°N 0.939760°W	United Reformed Church	–	An Independent chapel (Nile Street Chapel; click for image) (Note: Demolished c. 2015.) was founded in Emsworth by Rev. William Scamp, pastor of the Independent meeting house in Havant between 1803 and 1846. It was registered in September 1856. By 1891 it had become Congregational and in 1929 the church moved to this brick building nearby, which was registered in its place in September of that year. Maurice Lawson of Camberley was the architect. On 26 May 2019 the church officially merged with Havant United Reformed Church to form a single entity.	
Hart Plain Church (More images)		Hart Plain; 50.894556°N 1.033471°W	Anglican/Methodist	–	This building is shared by the Church of England and Methodist Church and has ministers of both denominations. It was registered as a place of Methodist worship in April 1969.	
Brethren Meeting Room (More images)		Hart Plain; 50.893297°N 1.025157°W	Plymouth Brethren Christian Church	–	Planning permission for construction of this meeting room on Hart Plain Avenue was granted in January 2000.	
St Faith's Church (More images)		Havant; 50.851216°N 0.981861°W	Anglican	II*	Havant's parish church has been altered many times since it was built in the 12th century and now has a "venerable and complex" appearance. It is cruciform with a short centrally placed tower containing eight bells, aisled nave with transepts and a long chancel with a vaulted roof. The walls are of flint and rubble. Part of the west transept may have been a chantry chapel in the 15th century.	
Portsdown Community Church		Havant; 50.852318°N 0.982176°W	Evangelical	–	This church has occupied shop units on the upper floor of the Meridian Centre, a shopping mall in Havant town centre, since 1996, although it was founded 14 years previously. It was registered for marriages with the name The Beacon in March 2014.	
BAPS Shri Swaminarayan Satsang Bhavan		Havant; 50.854854°N 0.980842°W	Hindu	–	This place of worship is used by adherents of the Bochasanwasi Akshar Purushottam Swaminarayan Sanstha movement within the Swaminarayan spiritual tradition of Hinduism.	
Havant Methodist Church (More images)		Havant; 50.858457°N 0.982325°W	Methodist	–	Havant's original Wesleyan chapel, built on West Street in 1888, was succeeded by the present church north of the town centre. Residential development was focused on that part of the town in the mid-20th century, and land became available in the late 1950s next to what would become the civic centre. The trustees of the Wesleyan chapel disposed of an alternative site they already owned, bought it with the help of War Damage Commission funds and built the present church in 1958.	
St Joseph's Church (More images)		Havant; 50.852979°N 0.990138°W	Roman Catholic	–	Architect John Crawley designed Havant's Decorated Gothic Revival-style Catholic church, which opened and was registered in 1875. Fittings include an altar, tabernacle and reredos ("something of a Gothic showpiece") by Farmer & Brindley and stained glass by Lavers, Barraud and Westlake. The church succeeded a chapel at Brockhampton (1752). A presbytery and school were built at the same time adjacent to the church, also to the design of Crawley.	
Havant Spiritualist Church (More images)		Havant; 50.851374°N 0.986361°W	Spiritualist	–	This church opened in 1996 and was registered in September of that year.	
Havant United Reformed Church (More images)		Havant; 50.852949°N 0.981589°W	United Reformed Church	–	A.E. Stallard designed Havant's Congregational chapel and attached lecture room and schoolroom in 1891, succeeding the Independent chapel in The Pallant which had been built in 1728 but which was no longer large enough to accommodate worshippers. It opened on 26 May 1891 and was registered for marriages shortly afterwards. The walls are of rag-stone and the steep roof has a thin spire, and the style is Decorated Gothic Revival.	
St Peter's Church (More images)		Hayling Island; 50.823729°N 0.963752°W	Anglican	I	Smaller and of a more irregular design than St Mary's, to which it was a subordinate chapel, St Peter's is nevertheless slightly older than that church: some parts date from the late 12th century. There is no tower, only a timber belfry of the late 19th century. Of similar vintage is the vestry, built as part of a "mild" restoration in the 1880s. A church hall of a "daring ... oval plan" was added in 1999–2000. The stone walls have substantial buttresses in some places.	
St Mary's Church (More images)		Hayling Island; 50.795469°N 0.976906°W	Anglican	II*	St Mary's is a stone-built cruciform church of the mid-13th century, restored in the Victorian era but with little change in its appearance and layout. Its central tower is very short but is topped by a large, visually prominent shingled spire. Also prominent is the "graceful" east window of five lancets containing a well detailed Tree of Jesse stained glass design of 1925.	
St Andrew's Church (More images)		Hayling Island; 50.781588°N 0.962052°W	Anglican/Baptist	–	Anglican services were held in a community centre in the southeastern part of Hayling Island from the 1940s. Permanent arrangements were made in 1964 when St Andrew's was founded as a daughter church of St Mary's; the present building superseded the original premises, now the church hall. In 2012 it became a joint Anglican and Baptist church when Hayling Island Baptist Church, which had been established in 1994, began sharing the building.	
Hayling Christian Centre (More images)		Hayling Island; 50.790721°N 0.976871°W	Elim Pentecostal	–	This was built in 1894, was registered as Elm Grove Free Church in June 1897 and was described in 1908 as a "Free Church mission house". The building is now occupied by a Pentecostal congregation. Major refurbishment work began in 2017.	
St Patrick's Church (More images)		Hayling Island; 50.799308°N 0.981922°W	Roman Catholic	–	The church was built in 1924 for £12,000 by a Portsmouth man to the Romanesque Revival design of W.C. and J.H. Mangan and could seat 130 worshippers. A further £26,000 was spent in 1964–66 on a major extension to the design of T.K. Makins, increasing the capacity to 350. It is an l-shaped building with a squat corner tower in which the round-arched entrance is set. Its upper stage, below the pyramid roof, has distinctive yellow and grey stonework in a chequerboard pattern.	
South Hayling United Reformed Church (More images)		Hayling Island; 50.787868°N 0.977452°W	United Reformed Church	–	A permanent chapel for Congregationalists on Hayling Island was built in 1830, 19 years after meetings began in a farmhouse. The chapel was founded by Rev. William Scamp of Havant, who had also established the chapel at Emsworth. The church was registered for marriages in 1890, and a hall was added in 1923. The premises were damaged in April 1941 by wartime bombing, and a temporary building had to be used until the present church was erected in 1954. Extensions were built in 1956, 1983, 1998 and 2008.	
St Nicholas' Chapel (More images)		Langstone; 50.839115°N 0.980836°W	Anglican	–	Henry Williams Jeans fras, author, lecturer at Cambridge University and the former Royal Naval Academy in Portsmouth and a churchwarden at St Faith's in Havant, lived at a house called Langstone Towers at Langstone Harbour. In 1868, with the help of a legacy from a relative, he extended the house and added a chapel for the use of his family and the general public. It was a chapel of ease to St Faith's and was initially known as Langstone Mission Chapel; its dedication to Saint Nicholas is modern. The small church (capacity 50 worshippers) is unconsecrated but remains in public use.	
St Alban's Church (More images)		Leigh Park; 50.867851°N 0.971251°W	Anglican	–	The West Leigh area of the Leigh Park estate initially had no churches: worshippers had to travel into the centre of the estate or to Havant. The rector of St Faith's Church founded a Sunday school in the buildings of a wartime naval camp, and from this St Alban's was founded as a daughter church. The first building was consecrated in April 1957 and was replaced by the present church of 1966 by David Evelyn Nye, which is a "distinctive [and] simple" timber-framed cruciform building inspired by Scandinavian architecture. A major refurbishment was carried out in 1993–94.	
St Clare's Church (More images)		Leigh Park; 50.876392°N 0.997860°W	Anglican	–	This church serves the Warren Park area of the Leigh Park estate, where work on the first houses began in 1965. Plans to build the church were announced in June 1968, the first stone was laid in May 1970 and the dedication ceremony took place just under six months later.	
St Francis' Church (More images)		Leigh Park; 50.867332°N 0.989380°W	Anglican	–	Leigh Park's first Anglican priest was appointed in 1952, ten years before St Francis'—the first permanent Anglican church on the estate—opened. The present church hall served as a place of worship from 1954, before which various huts and houses were used. T.K. Makins designed the new church in 1962: "a successful design", it has a distinctive humpback roof with a thin copper flèche, a gabled entrance featuring a large window with metal detailing, and concrete roof trusses. The font was originally designed for Guildford Cathedral by its architect Edward Maufe.	
Leigh Park Baptist Church (More images)		Leigh Park; 50.865946°N 0.979083°W	Baptist	–	Baptists in the Leigh Park area initially met in a former farmhouse building, then in a school when numbers grew. The present church opened in May 1957. The foundation stone and other material from Lake Road Baptist Chapel in Portsmouth, a church of 1865 which had been destroyed in World War II, was incorporated into the walls.	
Bethel Evangelical Free Church (More images)		Leigh Park; 50.870576°N 0.990026°W	Evangelical	–	This church developed from a Sunday school which was held from 1955 in a wooden building. The present church premises were registered for marriages in February 1968.	
Empower Centre Havant (More images)		Leigh Park; 50.866929°N 0.996003°W	Non-denominational	–	For several years, local Methodists used a hut next to the estate's first pub for church services and a Sunday school. The hut had been shared by all the main denominations in the estate's earliest years. A church was erected on Botley Drive, described as "an exact copy of the church hall at Drayton Methodist Church", (Note: In Portsmouth; now known as Drayton United Church.) in September 1956. The building is now used by Empower Community Church, a non-denominational body with several congregations in the south Hampshire area.	
St Michael and All Angels Church (More images)		Leigh Park; 50.869488°N 0.989423°W	Roman Catholic	–	Catholic worship on the estate started in 1951 in a Nissen hut, then in 1955 the Church of Blessed Margaret Pole (now the church hall) was built on Dunsbury Way. A larger church dedicated to St Michael and All Angels replaced it in 1970 and was registered in June of that year, but it was destroyed by fire in 2001 after being hit by lightning and a replacement church was built on the site. The £1.3 million building was dedicated in February 2005.	
Church of the Good Shepherd (More images)		Purbrook; 50.859981°N 1.028664°W	Anglican	–	This church is located in the Crookhorn area of Purbrook. It is linked informally with Purbrook parish church and Christ Church at nearby Widley. The building dates from 1978 and is a multi-purpose facility.	
St John the Baptist's Church (More images)		Purbrook; 50.867776°N 1.044950°W	Anglican	II	A chapel of ease for Purbrook village, linked to St Andrew's parish church at Farlington, was built in 1843 to the design of architect J.P. Harrison. Much of the stained glass dates from 1858, when the church was consecrated after a long-running disagreement with the rector of Farlington on the subject of ritualism. The Decorated Gothic Revival church is built of flint and stone, with a steep roof, tower at the west end and an aisle on the south side only.	
St Thomas a Becket Church (More images)		Warblington; 50.843698°N 0.965942°W	Anglican	I	The church stands in farmland just south of Havant town, and is set in a "lonely but well-filled churchyard" in which two huts were built in the 19th century for watchmen to guard against body-snatchers. It was dedicated to Mary (as the Church of Our Lady) until 1796. Part of the central tower is Anglo-Saxon, although the lower stage was rebuilt in the 13th century and is contemporary with the rest of the church. The three-bay nave has north and south aisles. The original Saxon-era chancel was rebuilt in the late 13th century; it was restored by architect J. H. Ball in 1893. The floor is mostly laid with encaustic tiles made at Otterbourne in the 13th century.	
St George's Church (More images)		Waterlooville; 50.880320°N 1.032595°W	Anglican	–	Jacob and Thomas Ellis Owen designed Waterlooville's first Anglican church in 1830. It was originally in the parish of Farlington. The chancel was remodelled in the early 20th century, and only this was retained (and converted into a Lady chapel) when a new church was built in 1968–70 to the design of T. K. Makins following wholesale redevelopment of the town centre. There is a tower at the west end (facing the street) with an open belfry; behind this, the concrete-built church has areas of leaded glass. Some stained glass and a coat of arms were also moved from the original church.	
Waterlooville Baptist Church (More images)		Waterlooville; 50.884702°N 1.026436°W	Baptist	–	An "elaborate Italianate" church was built in 1884–85 in the centre of Waterlooville as it grew during the Victorian era. Following redevelopment of the town centre, a new church was built in a Modernist style on London Road in 1966 to the design of Michael Manser. It was registered in February 1967. "Simple and elegant" in design with a "finely proportioned interior", the building has been described as "architecture of high quality".	
Brethren Meeting Room (More images)		Waterlooville; 50.883813°N 1.028531°W	Plymouth Brethren Christian Church	–	This meeting room opened in 1972 and was registered with the name Clive Trust Meeting Room, coinciding with the deregistration of a building on Clive Road in Fratton which had previously been the main Brethren place of worship in the area. The name had changed to Waterlooville Trust Meeting Room by the time it was closed in 1993, but it was later re-registered for worship only.	
Church of the Sacred Heart and St Peter the Apostle (More images)		Waterlooville; 50.883181°N 1.027810°W	Roman Catholic	–	Architect Columba Cook designed Waterlooville's new Catholic church in 2010–11. It stands a short distance west of the original church. The yellow-brick, slate-roofed building has a "splendid" pine roof inside, consisting of trusses meeting in a central octagon. A low tower sits above the entrance. The church was registered for marriages in November 2011.	
Wecock Church (More images)		Wecock Farm; 50.901160°N 1.031096°W	Evangelical	–	The church is used by the Living Waters Christian Fellowship, an Evangelical Christian group, for whom it was registered under the name Living Waters Church in April 1995. It occupies the former Catholic church of St Augustine of Canterbury, which opened in 1978 as a chapel of ease within the parish of the Sacred Heart at Waterlooville.	

== Former places of worship ==
Former places of worship
Name	Image	Location	Denomination/ Affiliation	Grade	Notes	Refs
Bedhampton Gospel Hall (More images)		Bedhampton; 50.854944°N 0.998756°W	Open Brethren	–	This former Gospel hall stands on the main road through Bedhampton. It was registered in 1912 and was still in religious use in 2002 or later, but is now a house.	
Cowplain Evangelical Free Church		Cowplain; 50.894333°N 1.018568°W	Evangelical	–	This was registered as a mission hall in March 1910. In 1968 it was superseded by the new Cowplain Evangelical Church nearby, and the building has been altered and converted into a shop.	
Independent Meeting House (More images)		Havant; 50.851856°N 0.980627°W	Congregational	II	Havant's first Nonconformist chapel was erected for Presbyterians in 1718, but later became Congregational. It was extended in 1816 and was registered for marriages in August 1837, and as the cause grew a larger chapel (the present Havant United Reformed Church) was built nearby. After this opened in 1891, the old chapel became a warehouse and was used for miscellaneous commercial purposes. Later it was "crudely converted" into flats. The red- and blue-brick building has a symmetrical façade with a rendered arched panel in the gable and a hipped roof. Large arched windows survive on the front and side elevations.	
Havant Wesleyan Methodist Chapel (More images)		Havant; 50.852033°N 0.985705°W	Methodist	–	Wesleyan Methodists built a brick chapel in 1888 on West Street close to St Joseph's Catholic Church. It was not registered for marriages until November 1940, by which time a site for a new church had already been bought on the road east towards Emsworth; but World War II intervened, and the postwar development of Havant encouraged the trustees to find a different site north of the town centre. The old chapel was accordingly superseded by the new Methodist church opened on Petersfield Road in 1958 and is now in commercial use.	
North Hayling United Reformed Church (More images)		Hayling Island; 50.813237°N 0.976616°W	United Reformed Church	–	The chapel opened in 1874 in the Stoke area of the island, although it was not formally registered until November 1936. It closed in 1991 when worship was consolidated at the United Reformed church in South Hayling.	
Purbrook Methodist Church (More images)		Purbrook; 50.867258°N 1.043648°W	Methodist	–	The 330-capacity church building was constructed of brick in 1932 to replace the smaller chapel on London Road. It was registered in May of that year, but closed after 2009 and by 2014 had been converted into a Masonic hall.	
Purbrook Primitive Methodist Chapel		Purbrook; 50.867954°N 1.044755°W	Methodist	–	The former chapel dates from 1879, although it was not registered for marriages until September 1904. It stands next to St John the Baptist's Church and has been used as its church hall since 1932, when the new Methodist church was built on Stakes Road. Major interior alterations were carried out in the early 21st century.	
Kingdom Hall		Waterlooville; 50.886242°N 1.032833°W	Jehovah's Witnesses	–	This building on Jubilee Road was registered as a Kingdom Hall between January 1966 and March 2010.	
Gospel Hall (More images)		Waterlooville; 50.874636°N 1.038129°W	Open Brethren	–	Still in religious use in 2002 but subsequently closed, this building was registered for marriages in March 1974.	
Church of the Sacred Heart		Waterlooville; 50.882195°N 1.026119°W	Roman Catholic	II	A convent for the Sisters of Our Lady of Charity, built in 1889 to the design of Leonard Stokes, was extended in 1923 by the addition of a triple-naved chapel of "extraordinary" plan: the three naves branch off a single chancel. One was designated for public use by the Catholic parishioners of Waterlooville. Architecturally the building is Byzantine Revival—a style often used by its architect, W. C. Mangan—with Art Deco and Gothic Revival elements.	

== Bibliography ==
- Balfour, Alan (1970). Portsmouth. City Buildings Series. London: Studio Vista. ISBN 0-289-79806-X.
- Dwyer, Gerard (1981). Diocese of Portsmouth – Past and Present. Portsmouth: Portsmouth Diocesan Centenary Committee.
- Facey, Roy A., ed. (1981). International Church Index (Doctrinal). Index Publications. ISBN 0-907578-00-4.
- Houseley, Christine M. (1975). A History of the Catholic Church in Havant. Emsworth: Catholic Parish of Havant.
- Hill, Roy (2002) [1990]. The Assemblies Address Book (PDF) (5th ed.). Bristol: Christian Year Publications. ISBN 1-872734-25-1. Archived from the original (PDF) on 19 September 2004.
- Kelly, Bernard W. (1907). Historical Notes on English Catholic Missions (PDF). London: Kegan Paul, Trench, Trübner & Co.
- Lloyd, David W. (1974). Buildings of Portsmouth and its Environs: A survey of the dockyard, defences, homes, churches, commercial, civic and public buildings. Portsmouth: City of Portsmouth. ISBN 0-901559-53-9.
- McAuley, Fr James (16 July 2016). The Diocese of Portsmouth Parish Boundaries 2016 (PDF) (Report). Portsmouth: Roman Catholic Diocese of Portsmouth. Archived (PDF) from the original on 16 May 2017.
- Methodist Church of Great Britain (1947). Methodist Church Buildings: Statistical Returns including Seating Accommodation as at July 1st, 1940 (PDF). Manchester: The Department for Chapel Affairs. (Available online in 14 parts; Guide to abbreviations on page 6)
- O'Brien, Charles; Bailey, Bruce; Pevsner, Nikolaus; Lloyd, David W. (2018). Hampshire: South. The Buildings of England. London: Yale University Press. ISBN 978-0-300-22503-7.
- Offord, John (1989). Churches, Chapels and Places of Worship on Portsea Island. Southsea: John Harman. ISBN 0-9514001-0-X.
- Stell, Christopher (1991). Inventory of Nonconformist Chapels and Meeting-Houses in South-West England. London: Royal Commission on the Historical Monuments of England. ISBN 0-117011-81-9.
