= The Cowplain School =

Coordinates: 50.892°N 1.025°W

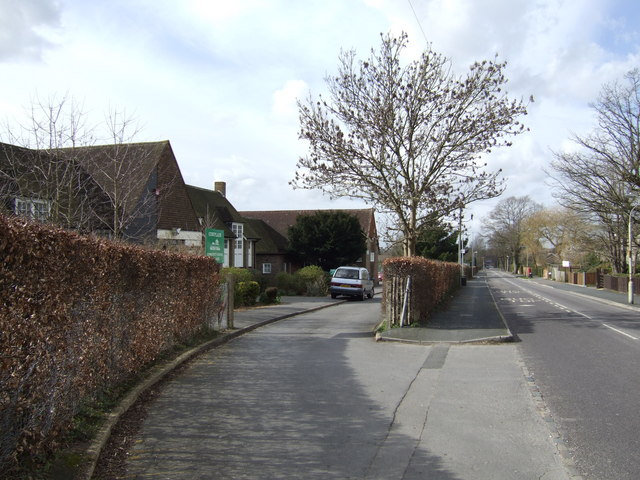

Location
- Hart Plain Avenue; Waterlooville, Hampshire; England

Information
- Type: Academy
- Established: 1930
- Department for Education URN: 138038 Tables
- Ofsted: Reports
- Head teacher: Ian Gates
- Gender: Coeducational
- Age: 11 to 16
- Enrolment: 1071
- Website: http://www.cowplainschool.co.uk/

The Cowplain School (formerly Cowplain Community School, and Cowplain Comprehensive school) is a coeducational secondary school located in Cowplain, Hampshire in the south of England. It has approximately 1,060 students and around 60 teaching staff, plus around 35 other staff.

== History ==
The school was founded in 1930 and takes pupils from villages in the area, including Denmead, Hambledon, Purbrook & Petersfield. It was originally a mixed-school, but later on became a boys' school, as girls went to Crookhorn School.

After World War II, the school again included girls, though they were separated from the boys. Now, it is a co-educational school with students of mixed ability and age range.

There was a large deliberate fire in February 1970.

Cowplain School was awarded Business and Enterprise College status in September 2005.

In 2007, Cowplain School was given healthy school status.

In 2008, Cowplain School was made into a foundation school.

In 2012, Cowplain School became an academy.

In 2016, Cowplain Community School became The Cowplain School.

== Buildings ==
Cowplain School originally consisted of one building. As the student population increased, the school was extended. The original building became the Main Building. The Central Building and the South Wing were added, and then the West Wing. The Business Centre was completed during the academic year 2006/07 with the money from a Business and Enterprise College status grant.

In the 1970s, the South Wing burned down, following a fire in the Science department on the top floor. It was rebuilt and from 2001-2003 was refurbished.

== Notable alumni ==
- Michael East (Gold Medal 1500m 2002 Commonwealth Games)
- Rob Styles (Premier League Referee)
- Jill Ellis (USA Women’s national football team coach, FIFA Women’s World Cup Winners 2015 and 2019)
