= Waterlooville Baptist Church =

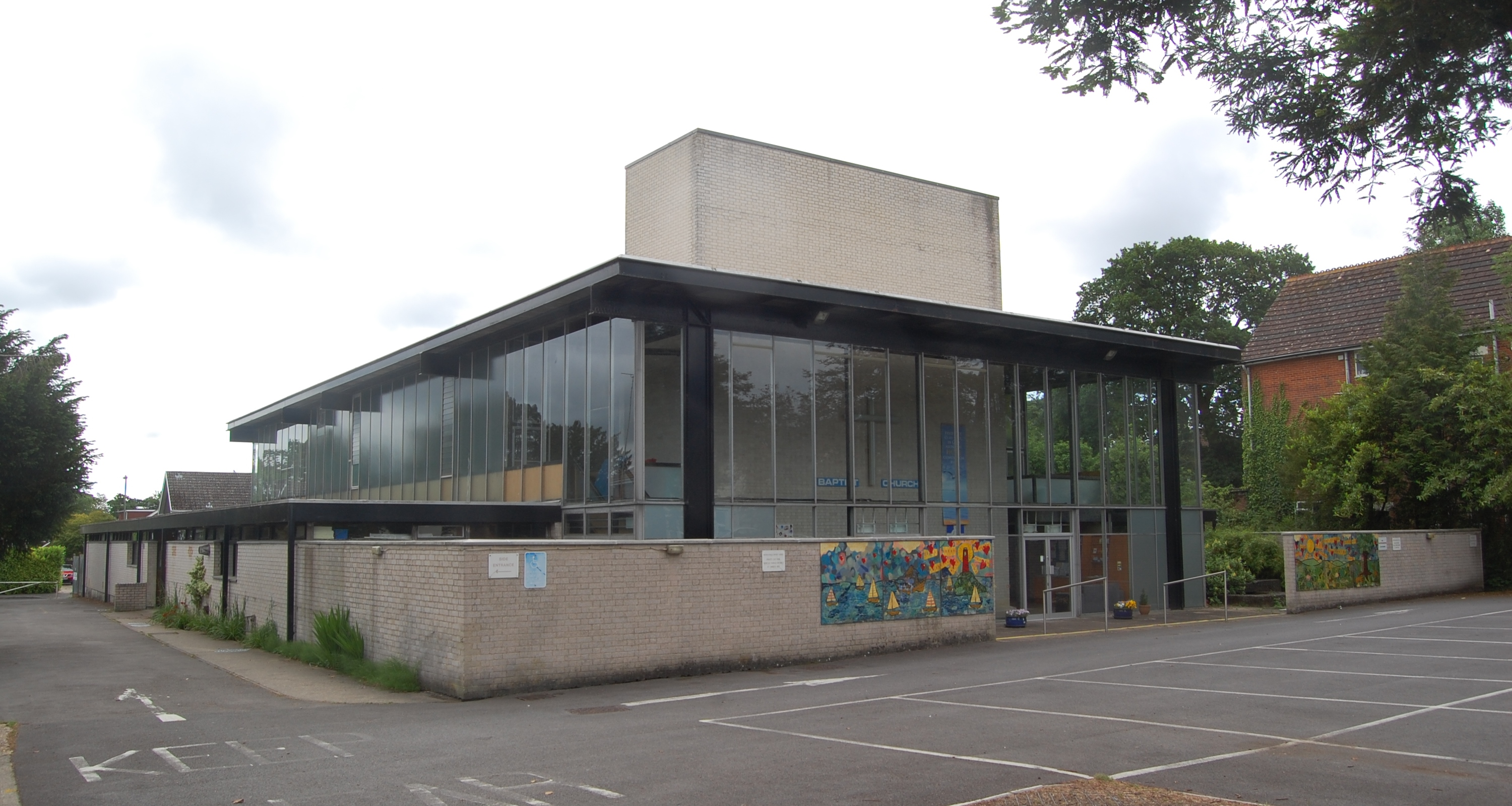
- The church from the northwest
- Waterlooville Baptist Church
- 50.884702°N 1.026436°W
- OS grid reference: SU 68580 09920
- Location: 368 London Road, Waterlooville, Hampshire PO7 7SY
- Country: England
- Denomination: Baptist
- Website: www.waterloovillebaptist.org.uk

History
- Status: Church
- Founded: 1872 (as Ebenezer Chapel)

Architecture
- Functional status: Active
- Architect: Michael Manser
- Style: Modernist
- Groundbreaking: 1966
- Completed: 1967

Administration
- District: South Eastern Baptist Association

Waterlooville Baptist Church is a Baptist church in Waterlooville and surrounding suburban areas in the borough of Havant in Hampshire, southeast England. Built in 1966 to replace a Victorian chapel on a different site, the church is affiliated with the Baptist Union of Great Britain.

== History ==
Waterlooville (historically known as Waterloo and Waterloo Ville) developed from the early 19th century as a linear settlement along the A3 road from London to Portsmouth, on land made available by the enclosure of the Forest of Bere. Since then it has transformed from a residential area to a "large village with urban characteristics", including several coaching inns, and by the 1960s had become the focus of a sprawling suburban area.

Ecclesiastically the village was in the parish of Farlington. The Anglican St George's Church was built in the early 19th century, and Nonconformists were initially catered for by a building called Ebenezer Chapel which had been registered in November 1874. This was succeeded by a new centrally located Baptist chapel built between 1884 and 1885 to the design of George Rake, a locally prolific architect, (Note: His other buildings in the area include HM Prison Kingston, Kingston Cemetery and the Portsmouth Borough Lunatic Asylum (later St James' Hospital) in Portsmouth, the original South Parade Pier at Southsea and several villas in Fareham.) and registered in September 1885. This "elaborate" building and adjacent institution, designed in the Italianate style and featuring a tower, was one of the town's "few architectural landmarks".

The town's rapid postwar growth, including the development of several overspill estates for people moved out of war-damaged Portsmouth, prompted wholesale redevelopment of the town centre in the 1960s. The area around the old crossroads of the London Road and the road to Hambledon was rebuilt with new commercial and industrial buildings, and the 1885 Baptist chapel was demolished as part of this. A new site was found further north on London Road, and construction of a replacement church started in 1966. It opened in 1967.

== Architecture ==
Architect Michael Manser set up in solo practice in 1961 and became known for "uncompromisingly modern work". His design for the new Waterlooville Baptist Church reflected these principles and has attracted widespread praise from architectural historians. Alan Balfour described it as "elegant and superbly constructed" and "architecture of high quality", noting particularly the "subtlety" of its internal layout and proportions. The Pevsner Architectural Guides describe it as "an impressively economical design, in form and materials".

The church is steel-framed using projecting black-painted I-beams laid both horizontally and vertically. Glazed curtain walling encloses the whole entrance vestibule on the front of the church, which faces west on to the north–south London Road. The interior is laid out as a tall box with a central division formed by a full-height altar screen, the back of which can be seen through the fully glazed front elevation. There is also an entrance on the side of the building. Behind the dividing wall (to the east) is a hall which can be used for various purposes; it flanked by shorter single-storey "wings" forming smaller spaces used for offices and similar. There is also a moveable screen dividing the hall and the church. The altar screen is "a solid volume of raw grey brick", and the side wings and rear parts of the building are of the same brickwork. The furnishings are plain and simple, of marble and steel, apart from a 19th-century pulpit.

== Administration ==
Waterlooville Baptist Church is registered for worship in accordance with the Places of Worship Registration Act 1855; its number on the register is 70818. It was registered for the solemnisation of marriages in accordance with the Marriage Act 1949 on 6 February 1967. It belongs to the Southern Counties Baptist Association, one of 13 regional divisions within Baptists Together (the Baptist Union of Great Britain).

== See also ==
- List of places of worship in the Borough of Havant

== Bibliography ==
- Balfour, Alan (1970). Portsmouth. City Buildings Series. London: Studio Vista. ISBN 0-289-79806-X.
- Lloyd, David W. (1974). Buildings of Portsmouth and its Environs: A survey of the dockyard, defences, homes, churches, commercial, civic and public buildings. Portsmouth: City of Portsmouth. ISBN 0-901559-53-9.
- O'Brien, Charles; Bailey, Bruce; Pevsner, Nikolaus; Lloyd, David W. (2018). Hampshire: South. The Buildings of England. London: Yale University Press. ISBN 978-0-300-22503-7.
