= Leigh Park =

Suburb of Havant, Hampshire, England

Coordinates: 50.869°N 0.987°W

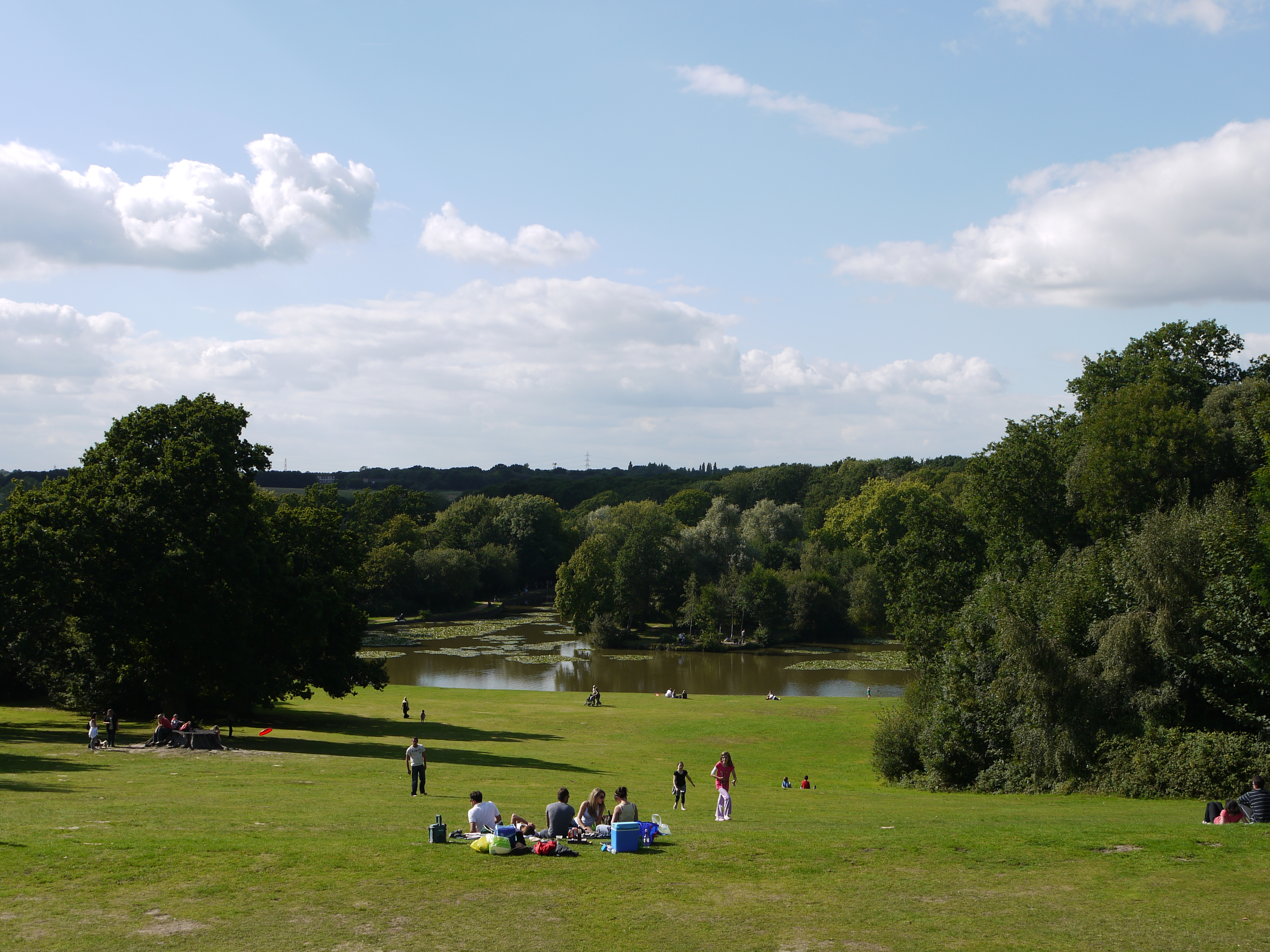
- Staunton Country Park

- Location within Hampshire
- Population: Approx 27,500
- OS grid reference: SU712082
- District: Havant
- Shire county: Hampshire
- Region: South East
- Country: England
- Sovereign state: United Kingdom
- Post town: Havant
- Postcode district: PO9
- Dialling code: (023)
- Police: Hampshire and Isle of Wight
- Fire: Hampshire and Isle of Wight
- Ambulance: South Central
- UK Parliament: Havant

Leigh Park is a large suburb (population 27,500) of Havant, in Hampshire, England. It currently forms the bulk or whole of four electoral wards: Battins, Bondfields, Barncroft and Warren Park (generally referred to as 'The Warren').

Staunton Country Park lies on the northern edge of Leigh Park, also within the Havant boundary.

== History ==
Leigh Park existed before becoming a Post-Second World War housing estate.

=== Early history ===
As early as 1750, there have been mentions made of a farm on the site in a will of that year and local historians consider it likely that a farm existed there around 100 years earlier.

=== Leigh Park Estate ===
The stables, walled garden and coach house of the house survived as part of Staunton Country Park. The estate encompassed decorative planting, lakes and follies and was described as "one of the most beautiful spots in the county" in 1826.

In 'The Imperial Gazetteer of England and Wales' Leigh is described as a tything of Havant parish two miles to the north west of Havant with a population of 547.

=== Second world war ===
Leigh Park was re-developed as a new suburb for those made homeless in Portsmouth by bomb damage which occurred during World War II and to enable the new roads and parks of Portsmouth to be built.

=== Post war ===
The land for the estate was purchased by Portsmouth City council from the Fitzwygram family in 1944; work started on building in 1947 and the first residents moved in during 1949. The first shops opened in 1952 (in Stone Square) and the main shopping centre of Park Parade / Greywell Shopping opened in 1955. (Note: The centre consists of two main east-west shopping thoroughfares, with Greywell Road to the north and Park Parade to the south and west, and can be called either name)

The majority of homes in Leigh Park were built by Portsmouth City Council, not Havant Borough Council through a financially underwritten cooperation with the former Havant and Waterloo Urban District Council. Most Leigh Park tenants of social housing pay rent to the properties' owners Guinness Partnership (formerly Hermitage Housing) or Portsmouth City Council which has an office near Park Parade. Residents are liable in council tax to Havant Borough Council who provide local services and collect the Hampshire County Council proportion.

Construction of the estate was not fully completed until the early 1970s, although most of the houses in the area were built by 1960.

Barratt Homes is currently building on the former Procter & Gamble site in the centre of Leigh Park. Leigh Park was one of the largest wholly council estates in Europe however following the ongoing right to buy many of the properties are privately owned.

In 2004, Leigh Park made the news when a gang stole more than £100,000 from the Nationwide Building Society and a man sleeping on a bench was set on fire, in a separate incident.

== Governance ==
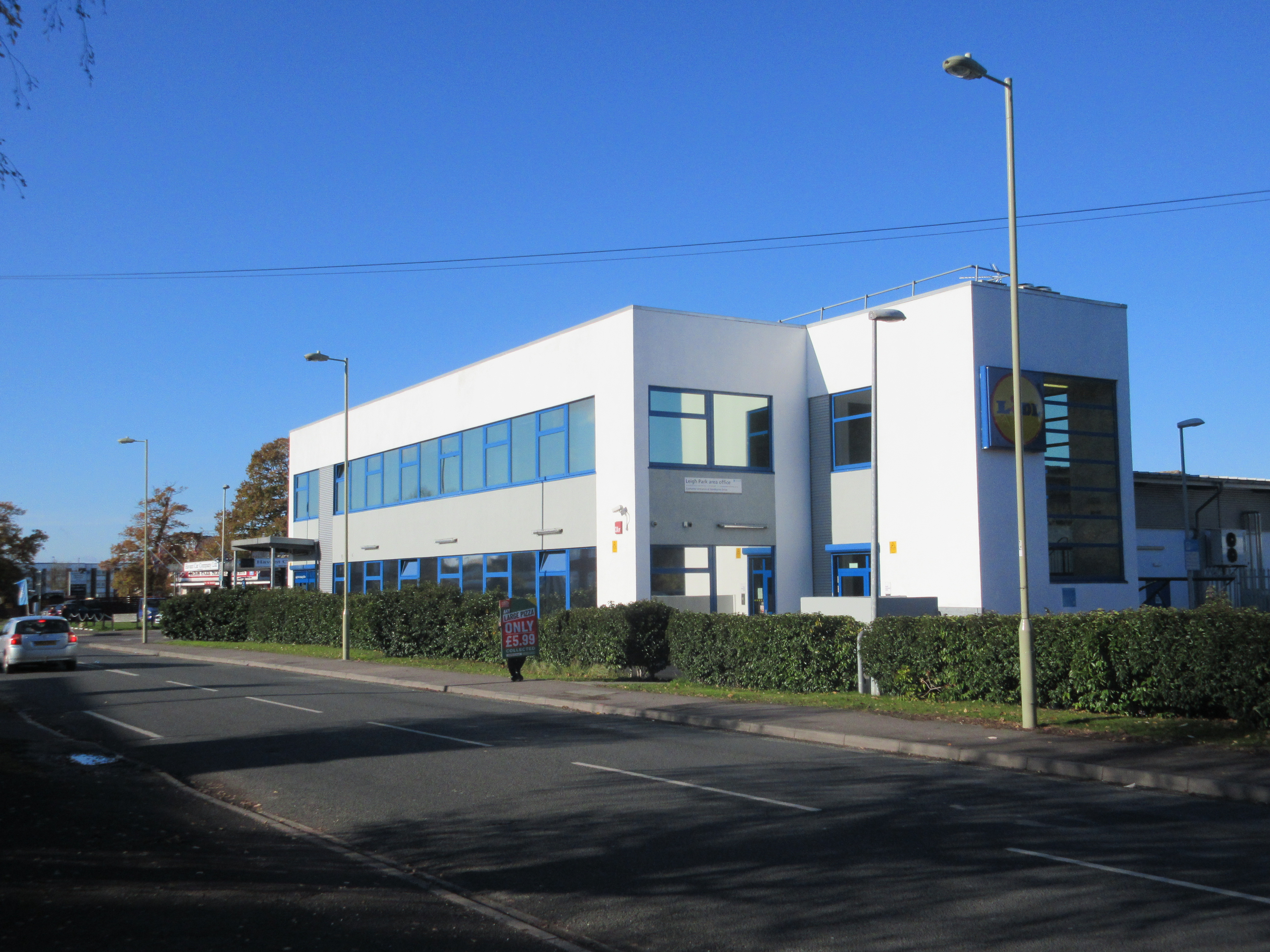
Portsmouth City Council Leigh Park Office November 2019. - Although under the remit of Havant Brough Council, Council properties are owned and managed by Portsmouth City Council

The suburb of Leigh Park comes under the remit of the local government district and borough of Havant and within the boundary of Hampshire County Council. As of November 2019 the area is broadly covered by the electoral wards of Barncroft, Battins and Warren Park while some northern section of Bedhampton ward might be considered within what might be commonly thought of Leigh Park.

Leigh Park is part of the parliamentary constituency of Havant. As of November 2019 it is served by MP Alan Mak, a Conservative.

== Geography ==
The modern estate is bordered to the east by the Havant to Petersfield railway line excluding perhaps some industrial units by the railway which would not be considered part of the estate. The Northern extent is approximately defined in line with the A3M and B2150 junction. Staunton Country Park and Leigh Park Gardens may or may not be considered part of the estate, as might the Southleigh House area which lies to the east of the Railway. The western edge is bounded but excluding houses around B2150 road from Old Bedhampton to Waterlooville. To the south, the boundary lies broadly just to the north of the B2149 road.

Leigh Park is broadly flat gradually rising to the North with some sharper rises at fringes around the northern parts.

The Hermitage Stream and tributaries run through parts of Leigh Park while the Lavant stream runs down the left side of the settlement. Both run into Langstone Harbour which is approximately 1 mile (1.6 km) to the south at the nearest point.

== Culture and community ==
There was a Bowling alley beside park parade that was converted to a bingo hall and opened by Diana Dors in 1984.

== Transport ==
The main shopping precinct is served by Stagecoach South bus routes 20, 22, 21, 23, 37, 19 and 39, which provide links with central Havant (with some services that lead into Portsmouth and the QA Hospital.). Stagecoach South also operate the 27 service through the estate between Rowlands Castle, Havant and Emsworth, and the 700 service between Havant, Portsmouth and Chichester.

Havant railway station is the nearest major train station, smaller stations Bedhampton and Rowlands Castle are near parts of Leigh Park. The A3(M) motorway and A27 Havant bypass are the areas' major links to the rest of the country.

== Education ==
Leigh Park contains several primary schools: Front Lawn, Trosnant, Riders, Sharps Copse, Park House, Warren Park, Barncroft School and St Albans C of E.

Leigh Park is currently served by three secondary schools: Havant Academy (known as Wakefords Secondary School when it opened in 1970 and latterly Staunton Community Sports College until 2009), Park Community School (known previously as Broomfield Secondary School, when it opened in 1958, and Broomfield Comprehensive School until 1988) and Prospect School, built in 2008, an education centre for children with learning and social disabilities.

The West Leigh area was also served by Oak Park Secondary School on Leigh Road (close to the junction with Crosland Drive - now demolished), from its opening in 1957 to its closure in the late 1980s. Pupils from that area then attended Warblington Comprehensive School situated some distance from the area on Southleigh Road, Denvilles.

Between 1958 and 1960 Havant Grammar School had shared the Broomfield Secondary School site on Middle Park Way until it moved to its own, new buildings on the corner of Barncroft Way and New Road. The title Havant Grammar School disappeared with the arrival of the comprehensive school system and it became Havant College a sixth-form college in 1974.

== Sport ==
The suburb's main non-league football side is Havant & Waterlooville who currently play in the Conference South, two divisions below the Football League. The team's main claim to fame is reaching the FA Cup fourth round in the 2007-08 season when they twice took the lead against Liverpool at Anfield before finally losing 5-2.

Havant Hockey Club play at Havant College on Barncroft Way (just on the outskirts of Leigh Park). The team were National and European Champions in the 1990s.

Sombourne Drive is home to Leigh Park Bowls Club and Front Lawn Recreation Ground, the "Rec" had a £1.5M upgrade and is now known as Front Lawn Community Hub, this upgrade provided improved facilities including four changing rooms, toilets and community space. In addition to this, Front Lawn Community Hub also has a full-size, state-of-the-art 3G artificial pitch; 3G floodlit football pitch inc. changing facilities; and multisport courts including: Tennis Courts x3 (x2 are floodlit), Basketball & Netball.

Leigh Park boxing club is based at the community centre.

== See also ==
- List of places of worship in the Borough of Havant

== Sources ==
- Cousins, Ralph; et al. (2017). A History of Leigh Park and the Hamlet of Leigh. Havant Borough.
- Hammond, Phil (September 1997). Leigh Park — the first fifty years. The Staunton Park Genealogy Centre.
- Community Centre, Leigh Park (1997). Leigh Park — Garden City of the South. Leigh Park Community Association. ISBN 0953142205.
- Wilson, John Marius (1870). The imperial gazetteer of England and Wales. Vol. 4, L–M. Edinburgh: A. Fullarton. p. 8. OCLC 1046644770.
