= Hart Plain =

Neighbourhood of Waterlooville, Hampshire, England

Coordinates: 50.89714°N 1.02876°W

- Location within Hampshire
- Population: 9,907 (2011 Census.Ward)
- OS grid reference: SU684113
- District: Havant
- Shire county: Hampshire
- Region: South East
- Country: England
- Sovereign state: United Kingdom
- Post town: Waterlooville
- Postcode district: PO8
- UK Parliament: Fareham and Waterlooville

Hart Plain is part of Waterlooville and is the northwesternmost ward in the Borough of Havant. The population of Hart Plain in 2015 was 8,755, making up 7.3% of Havant borough's population.

The ward is named after the old Hart Plain House which formerly stood on the site now occupied by Waterlooville Health Centre. The ward consists mainly of post-1950s housing and includes Portsmouth City Council's Wecock Farm Estate.

There is one school in the ward, Hart Plain Junior School, located next to the Cowplain School in Hart Plain Avenue.
