= St Thomas à Becket Church, Warblington =

St Thomas à Becket Church
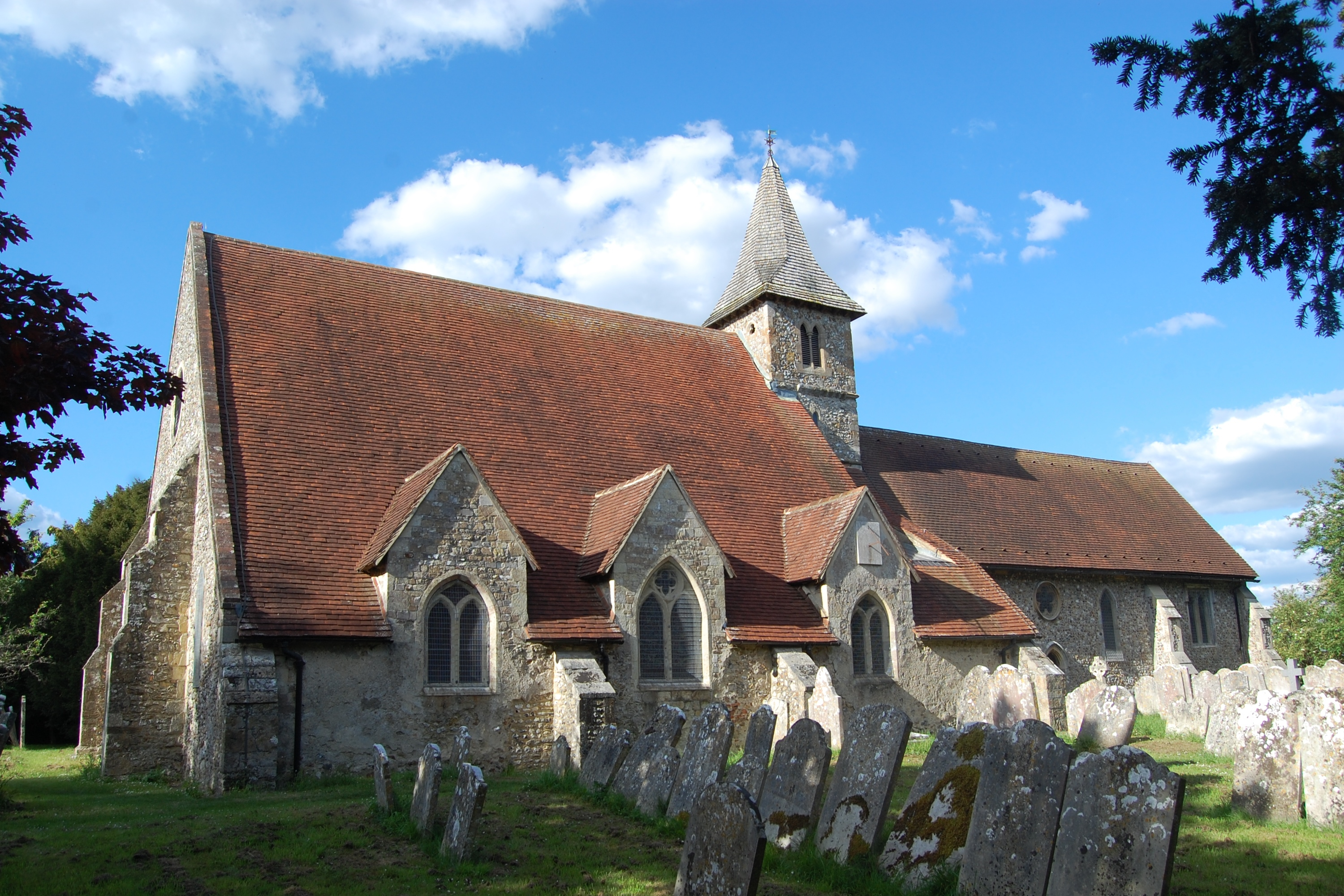
- The church from the southwest
- St Thomas à Becket Church
- 50.8437°N 0.9660°W
- OS grid reference: SU 72900 05418
- Location: Church Lane, Warblington, Havant, Hampshire PO9 2TU
- Country: England
- Denomination: Church of England
- Previous denomination: Roman Catholic
- Website: www.warblingtonwithemsworth.org/st-thomas-a-becket/

History
- Status: Parish church
- Founded: 11th century
- Dedication: Thomas Becket
- Dedicated: 1796 (previously dedicated to Our Lady)

Architecture
- Functional status: Active
- Heritage designation: Grade I
- Designated: 16 May 1952
- Style: Transitional/Early English Gothic

Administration
- Diocese: Portsmouth
- Archdeaconry: Portsdown
- Deanery: Havant
- Parish: Warblington with Emsworth

Clergy
- Rector: Revd Andrew Sheard

St Thomas à Becket Church, sometimes referred to as St Thomas of Canterbury's Church and known until 1796 as the Church of Our Lady, is the Church of England parish church of Warblington in Hampshire, England. It was founded in the Saxon era, and some Anglo-Saxon architecture survives. Otherwise the church is largely of 12th- and 13th-century appearance; minimal restoration work was undertaken in the 19th century. Its situation in a "lonely but well-filled churchyard" in a rural setting next to a farm made it a common site for body snatching in that era, and two huts built for grave-watchers survive at opposite corners of the churchyard.

Warblington is now a suburban area within the South Hampshire conurbation, and the church is about 1 mile (1.6 km) from the centre of Havant, the nearest large town, but St Thomas à Becket Church stands in a secluded area between a major trunk road and an inlet of the English Channel. Until the 19th century, when the parish was subdivided, the church served a large area including the nearby town of Emsworth. The parishes of Warblington and Emsworth have now been reunited, and regular services are held both at Warblington and at St James's Church in Emsworth.

The church is Grade I listed, the highest grade, for its architectural and historical importance. Listed separately at Grade II, the lowest grade, are the two grave-watchers' huts in the churchyard, which also has an "especially good group of mid-18th-century headstones". Important fittings in the church include a range of medieval and later monuments and locally made 13th-century encaustic tiles.

== History ==
Present-day Warblington is a suburban area in the town of Havant, 1 mile (1.6 km) from the town centre. The original centre of population was a small cluster of houses further south, surrounded by fields and next to a creek between Chichester and Langstone Harbours. They were close to a large farm (still extant), the manor house—now ruined, and known as Warblington Castle—and the original church. The population shift, where the core of the village moved north towards the present-day A27 trunk road, has been attributed to the growth of nearby Emsworth, which was always larger; the Black Death; and Richard Neville, 16th Earl of Warwick's creation of a deer park around the manor house during the time he was Lord of the manor.

The manor of Warblington (then named Warbliteton) was mentioned in the Domesday survey of 1086, (Note: It was assessed together with the manor of Westbourne in neighbouring Sussex, but was also considered as part of the Hundred of Bosmere along with the Hampshire parishes of Havant, North Hayling and South Hayling.) by which time the church was already in existence. It stood on the site of the present building's chancel, and the only surviving fabric from this Saxon building is the second (middle) stage of the present tower. This is formed of the upper part of what was originally a porch at the west end. Placed centrally on the present building, this small tower is "historically the core of the church". Nothing remains from the original nave and chancel to the east; based on measurements from the present church, the Victoria County History states they may have been 13.5 feet (4.1 m) wide.

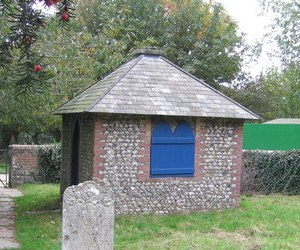
Two huts were built in the 19th century for grave-watchers.

The church was rebuilt in much larger form in or slightly before 1200; some work was also carried out later in the 13th century. Dating from this period are a three-bay nave with north and south aisles and arcades, and the upper storey of the tower (not yet topped by its present shingled spire). The lowest stage of the tower was opened out when the original nave was converted into a chancel; but later in the 13th century this was demolished and replaced with the present chancel, which is much larger and has a vestry at one corner. The significant enlargement of the church may have been prompted by the growth at that time of Emsworth, always the main settlement in the parish, which became a port in the 13th century. Also in the late 13th or early 14th century, (Note: The Victoria County History (1908) gives the 15th century as the date, but later research revised this.) the chancel floor was laid with glazed encaustic tiles similar to those at nearby Titchfield Abbey. Such tiles were made at Otterbourne near Winchester. A door and timber-framed porch were built on to the north aisle in the 15th century, and another door was added at the west end a century later.

People in Emsworth had to travel the 2 miles (3.2 km) to Warblington to worship until 1789–90, when a chapel of ease was built in the town's market place. This was replaced in 1840 by St James's Church, which became a parish church separate from Warblington the following year. (The parishes of Emsworth and Warblington were reunited by 1974.) Also in 1840, part of the parish of Warblington was transferred to the newly formed parish of Redhill (present-day Rowland's Castle), where a chapel of ease in Havant parish had been built in 1837–38.

Body snatching was a common crime for a period in the 19th century. Warblington was a popular site for this activity because of its "lonely but well-filled churchyard", isolated in a rural area and well screened by yew trees. In 1829–30 the church authorities employed local builders Benjamin Chase and James Cullis to build huts for grave-watchers at the northwest and southeast corners of the churchyard. Grave-watchers would stand in them and watch out for body snatchers. The single-storey structures are of flint and brick. One was also used as a tool shed after being extended from its original square plan.

Later in the 19th century, local architect J. H. Ball made some structural changes to the church, although the extent of the restoration was not significant. He replaced some of the 13th-century lancet windows, added an organ chamber on the north side of the chancel (moving a lancet window from the chancel and resetting it there), added the small spire, altered the east window and re-roofed the chancel. In 1909 a cinquefoil window was added above the main door.

The church was affected by an accidental fire on 16 January 2011 caused by an electrical fault. Although fire damage was confined to pews at the front of the church, smoke affected the whole building, damaging the organ and pulpit in particular. A programme of conservation and restoration work lasting several months took place to clean soot and smoke particles from the walls, ceiling beams, floor tiles, windows, arcade pillars and memorials using materials such as limewash and latex. A rededication ceremony took place in July 2011 after the work was finished.

== Architecture ==
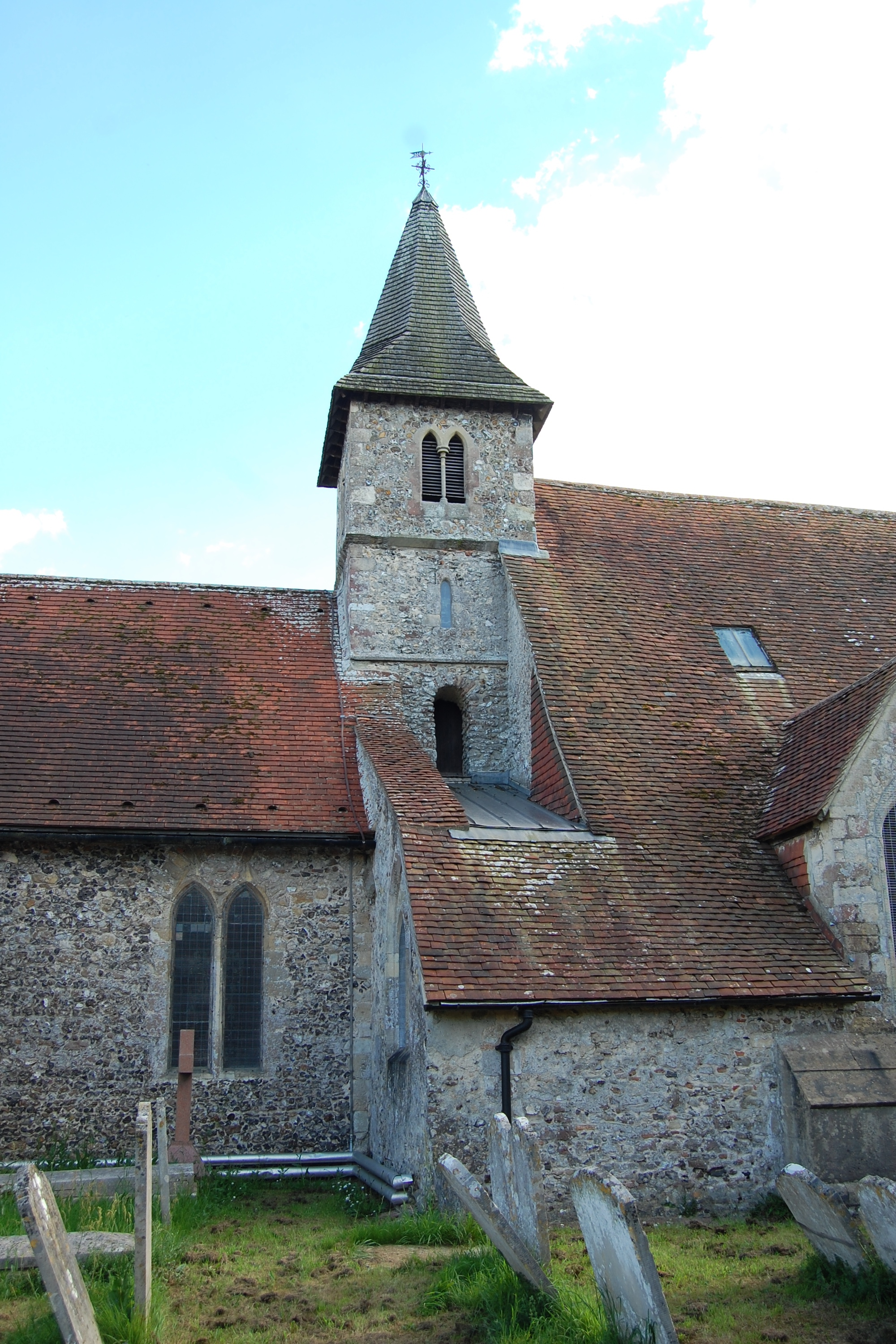
The small three-stage tower rises from the division between the chancel (left) and the nave (right).

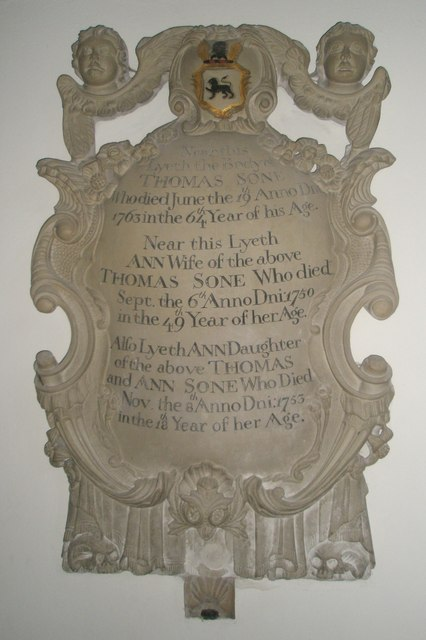
There are several Georgian memorials cartouches with fine lettering.

The church displays elements of the Transitional style from Norman to Gothic architecture and the Early English Gothic style. These styles reflect the date of its construction. The church has a chancel of "unusual length" measuring 45 by 15.5 feet (13.7 m × 4.7 m), a slightly narrower nave (41 by 18.25 feet (12.50 m × 5.56 m)), a central tower now of three stages, of which the lowest original stage was removed during the 13th-century rebuilding to open out the space between chancel and nave, an organ chamber and a vestry at the side of the chancel, north and south aisles to the nave, and a north porch.

The middle stage of the tower is the oldest surviving fabric of the building, pre-dating the Norman conquest of England. It measures 9 square feet (0.84 m^{2}) externally and has walls of 2.25 feet (0.69 m) thickness. The north and south walls have plain arched openings; another on the west face is now blocked. The stage above this was added in the 13th century and has lancet windows in the north and south faces. The uppermost stage, topped with a shingled spire added during the Victorian era, contains one bell and has paired lancet windows. Internally, the tower is supported on two chamfered and moulded arches spanned by a barrel vault. The east arch is late-13th or early-14th century and now forms the chancel arch.

The nave is "comparatively wide" and has three bays, each with a lancet window which on the outside extends well above the low, steeply sloping roofline, forming a series of gabled dormer windows—an appearance which contributes to the many-angled, "highly picturesque outline". Flanking the nave are the aisles with arcades of differing appearance, despite being built around the same time in the 13th century. The "beautiful" south arcade has octagonal piers and shafts of Purbeck Marble with richly detailed foliate capitals, similar to contemporary work at nearby Chichester Cathedral and Boxgrove Priory church. Although built at the same time, the north arcade is simpler and plainer, with round columns. To the east of the third bays, the aisles extend beyond the tower to form side chapels.

The east elevations of the chancel and vestry have three- and two-light lancet windows respectively, both with Victorian tracery. A medieval lancet survives in the north wall of the vestry. Some of the windows on the south side retain their original surrounds but were replaced in the 14th or 15th century. The west window of the nave, above the entrance, is formed of three stepped lancets and has a pointed arch. Between the vestry and the chancel is a squint with a sliding panel, allowing the altar to be viewed from the vestry. The "fine medieval porch" on the north side has woodwork of high quality in the arch and gable, dating from either the 14th or the 15th century, including bargeboards with fretwork tracery, and timber-framed stone inner walls.

== Monuments and churchyard ==
Southeast Hampshire had a "flourishing local sculptural tradition" in the Georgian era, specialising in memorial tablets and monuments for churches and notable for "excellent lettering and decorative details", and St Thomas à Becket Church has a significant collection inside and in the churchyard. There are two 14th-century tomb effigies: one, in a segmental-arched recess, of Purbeck Marble depicting a praying figure in a long gown, with a later carving of angels raising a soul to Heaven in a napkin at the back of the recess; and another in an ogee-arched recess showing a lady lying with her "finely delineated" hands by her sides (showing a level of detail of "quite unusual excellence") and with her facial features still visible, although the effigy is worn. One historian states they may be daughters of Robert Aguillon of the Aguillon family, who owned land at Emsworth. On the walls are several cartouches of the late 18th and early 19th centuries, at least one signed by J. Morey, a member of a family of sculptors who is buried in the churchyard. "The local sculptors were particularly good at cherubs", and many feature such figures. There is also a monumental brass of the late 16th century, depicting Raffe Smalpage (Henry Wriothesley, 2nd Earl of Southampton's personal chaplain) kneeling at a desk.

The churchyard has "an outstanding collection" of carved limestone headstones, many allegorical but others depicting real events. Several depict nautical scenes: HMS Torbay on fire in Portsmouth Harbour, commemorating a sailor who died in 1758; another dated the following year showing Dublin Bay, where the deceased sailor's ship sank; and another depicting an unidentified ship commemorating a seaman who was press-ganged. The grave-watchers' huts, built in 1829–30, stand at the northwest and southeast corners of the churchyard. They are of galleted flint with red-brick dressings and quoins, hipped roofs laid with slate tiles, and pointed arched entrances and windows with shutters. The southeastern hut has a stone chimney; the northwestern hut lacks one but is larger, having been extended, and was also used as a tool-shed.

== The church today ==
The church was listed at Grade I on 16 May 1952. Such buildings are defined as being of "exceptional interest" and greater than national importance. As of February 2001, it was one of two Grade I listed buildings, and 239 listed buildings of all grades, in the Borough of Havant. The grave-watchers' huts were listed at Grade II on the same date; this defines them as "nationally important and of special interest".

As of 2020 St Thomas à Becket Church holds a twice-monthly Holy Communion service, a weekly Matins (replaced once per month by another Holy Communion service) and a monthly evening service. Other services in the parish are held at St James's Church in Emsworth or jointly with the town's Methodist church.

== See also ==
- List of places of worship in the Borough of Havant
- Media related to St Thomas à Becket, Warblington at Wikimedia Commons
