= Capel Manor House =

Grade II* listed house in England

- Location within Kent
- 51.1339°N 0.4474°E
- Type: House
- Location: Horsmonden, Kent

History
- Built: 1969-70

Site notes
- Architect: Michael Manser
- Architectural style: Modern
- Governing body: Privately owned

Listed Building – Grade II*
- Official name: Capel Manor House
- Designated: 18 September 2013
- Reference no.: 1413746

Capel Manor House is a small modern steel-framed private house in Horsmonden, in Kent in southern England. It was designed by Michael Manser for John Howard, a former Member of Parliament. It was built between 1969 and 1970. The house was constructed on the site of, and within the remains of, Capel House, an earlier mansion built by Thomas Henry Wyatt in Italian Gothic style in the mid-nineteenth century and demolished in the 1960s. The architectural writer John Newman describes the Manser house as "a severe Miesian pavilion". The colonnades of Wyatt's winter garden now enclose a swimming pool. The house is an important example of modern architecture in Britain, and in 2013 was designated a Grade II* listed building.
