= Park Community School =

Location
- Middle Park Way; Leigh Park; Havant, Hampshire, PO9 4BU; England
- Coordinates: 50.870°N 1.001°W

Information
- Type: Community school
- Local authority: Hampshire
- Department for Education URN: 116473 Tables
- Ofsted: Reports
- Headteacher: Christopher Anders
- Gender: Coeducational
- Age: 11 to 16
- Enrolment: 905 as of April 2022
- Website: http://www.pcs.hants.sch.uk/

Park Community School is a coeducational community secondary school, located in the Leigh Park area of Havant in the English county of Hampshire.

It is administered by Hampshire County Council which coordinates the schools admissions. The school offers GCSEs, BTECs, OCR Nationals and ASDAN courses as programmes of study for pupils.

Park Community School moved into new buildings in September 2014, and refurbishment of other school buildings were in completed in 2015.
