= Michael Manser =

British architect (1929–2016)

Michael John Manser CBE RA
- Born: 23 March 1929; Bristol, England
- Died: 8 June 2016 (aged 87)
- Education: Regent Street Polytechnic
- Occupation: Architect
- Employer: Michael Manser Associates (now The Manser Practice)
- Children: Victoria (1956) Jonathan (1955)

Michael Manser CBE RA (23 March 1929 – 8 June 2016) was a British architect. He was a president of the Royal Institute of British Architects (RIBA) and established his own successful architecture practice in 1961.

== Education and career ==
Born in Bristol, Manser studied architecture at Regent Street Polytechnic, now the University of Westminster. Before setting up his own practice Michael Manser Associates in 1961, Manser worked in London and the West Indies for Norman and Dawbarn. He later became the non-executive chairman of the Manser Practice. His son Jonathan is now managing director. His daughter Victoria has her own architectural practice.

Manser was president of the Royal Institute of British Architects 1983-85 and was elected a member of the Royal Academy in November 1994. He was honoured with a CBE in 1993, but declined the honour in 1988 due to the controversy over modern architecture with Prince Charles and an infamous lecture for the 150th anniversary of the RIBA during Manser's presidency of the institute.

In 2001, Architects' Journal inaugurated the annual Manser Medal, named after Michael Manser, to recognise the best completed house in the UK.

== Notable buildings ==
- Waterlooville Baptist Church, Waterlooville, Hampshire (1967)
- Capel Manor House, 1970
- The Quell, Haslemere, Surrey: private house (1985)
- Hilton Hotel (originally Sterling Hotel), Heathrow Terminal 4, 1990
- Southampton Airport, 1994
- British High Commission (Umoja House), Dar es Salaam, Tanzania, 2002
