= James Edward Ignatius Masterson =

Recipient of the Victoria Cross (1862–1935)

James Edward Ignatius Masterson VC
- Born: 20 June 1862; Birr, County Offaly, Ireland
- Died: 24 December 1935 (aged 73); Waterlooville, Hampshire
- Burial place: Hulbert Road Cemetery, Waterlooville
- Military career
- Allegiance: United Kingdom
- Branch: British Army
- Service years: 1881 – 1912, 1914 – 1919
- Rank: Major
- Units: Royal Irish Fusiliers; Devonshire Regiment; King's Own Royal Lancaster Regiment
- Conflicts: 1882 Anglo-Egyptian War; Burma 1889–92; Tirah Campaign; Second Boer War; World War I
- Awards: Victoria Cross; Egypt Medal; India General Service Medal (1854); India Medal; Queen's South Africa Medal; Khedive's Star

Major James Edward Ignatius Masterson VC (20 June 1862 – 24 December 1935) was an Irish recipient of the Victoria Cross.

He was born into a military family, enlisted in the ranks in 1881, was commissioned ten years later, and served for a further twenty one years, retiring with the field rank of Major in 1912. He reenlisted in 1914, but failed his medical for overseas service, so was employed in an administrative capacity on the Embarkation & Transport staff, for the duration of the First World War.

Whilst he was of Irish descent, it was purely circumstantial that his father was posted to Ireland at the time of his birth. His father, born in Portsmouth, returned to his home town in his latter years, and Masterson latterly resided in Waterlooville for over 30 years.

== Early career ==
He was born the son of Elizabeth Christina nee Lawlor and her husband Thomas, in the fourth year since their marriage in Aldershot Garrison. Thomas was a soldier of the 2nd Battalion, 21st Foot, who served from 1850 to 1872. At the time of his birth, his father's battalion was stationed at Birr Barracks. (Note: The 2nd Battalion 21st Foot were disembarked at Dún Laoghaire on 22 November 1860. In 1861, the 2nd Battalion was at Birr Barracks. They departed on 11 July 1863, to redeploy to India. In 1871, the battalion was at the Thayet cantonment in Burma.) During this time, the family lived in Ireland, India and Burma. His father became quartermaster for the 3rd Militia Battalion on 1 April 1878, and the family resided at Hounslow Barracks at the time of the 1881 census.

Masterson enlisted at Aldershot in the Royal Irish Fusiliers on 25 August 1881, and served in the 1882 Anglo-Egyptian War, including the Battle of Tel-el-Kebir.

He was commissioned a second lieutenant in the Devonshire Regiment on 15 July 1891, served from 1891 to 1892 in operations to pacify Burma, and was promoted to lieutenant on 16 April 1895. From 1897 to 1898 he served with the 1st battalion of his regiment in the Tirah Campaign in the North-West Frontier of India under Sir William Lockhart.

== Second Boer War ==
The Second Boer War broke out in South Africa in October 1899, and the British government soon realized they would need more troops. Masterson arrived in late 1899 with the 1st battalion of his regiment, and were involved in the Relief of Ladysmith.

=== Victoria Cross ===
Masterson was 37 years old, and a lieutenant in the 1st Battalion, Devonshire Regiment, when the following deed took place on 6 January 1900, at Wagon Hill, Ladysmith, South Africa for which he was awarded the VC:

During the action at Wagon Hill, on the 6th January, 1900, Lieutenant Masterson commanded, with the greatest gallantry and dash, one of the three companies of his regiment which charged a ridge held by the enemy and captured their position.

The companies were then exposed to a most heavy and galling fire from the right and left front. Lieutenant Masterson undertook to give a message to the Imperial Light Horse, who were holding a ridge some hundred yards behind, to fire to the left front and endeavour to check the enemy's fire.

In taking this message he crossed an open space of a hundred yards which was swept by a most heavy cross fire, and although badly wounded in both thighs, managed to crawl in and deliver his message before falling exhausted into the Imperial Light Horse trench. His unselfish heroism was undoubtedly the means of saving several lives.

He was severely wounded during the action, and placed in a field hospital. In February 1900 he was promoted to captain (the appointment was dated back to 1 January 1900). After returning to active service, he received a brevet promotion to major on 29 November 1900 (gazetted in a 1901 South Africa Honours list), and stayed in South Africa until after the war formally ended in June 1902. His regiment's 1st Battalion had transferred to British India, and Masterson left Point Natal on the SS Ionian in November 1902 to join it at Ranikhet, Bengal Presidency.

== Later career ==
He transferred to the King's Own Royal Regiment (Lancaster) as a major on 16 August 1911 and retired from the army on 25 June 1912.

In 1914, after the outbreak of the First World War, he returned to the army. He failed the medical inspection and was deemed unfit for active service overseas. Nonetheless, he served for five years as a deputy director of railway transport, administrative services and departments, on the embarkation & transport staff. He was at Military Embarkation Port No.1, Southampton Docks.

His father, Thomas, born in Portsmouth, relocated here in the 1890s. He, as his son, took up residence in nearby Waterlooville in 1902. He died at Waterlooville, Hampshire, England, on 24 December 1935, aged 73.

His Victoria Cross is displayed at The Keep Military Museum of Devon and Dorset, Dorchester, Dorset, England.

His great grandfather, Sergeant Patrick Masterson of the 87th Foot, captured a Napoleonic eagle at the Battle of Barossa in 1811 and was given a field commission; this is portrayed in Bernard Cornwell's Sharpe's Fury. A spectacle akin to a Royal Tournament, The Army Pageant held in 1910 at Fulham Palace, saw a re-enactment of this feat, with Masterson portraying the Sergeant.
