= Messy Church =

Informal Christian activity for families

Messy Church logo

Messy Church is "a way of being church for families". Its slogan is "Church, but not as you know it".

== History ==
Messy Church began as a fresh expression of church in 2004 in the parish of Cowplain, near Portsmouth, England, and as of February 2019 there were more than 2,800 Messy Churches registered in England.

By 2015, Messy Church had spread from the UK to other European countries and to Australia, New Zealand, Canada, the USA, and South America, and by 2023 Messy Church was reportedly taking place in over 30 countries. It is supported and resourced by the Bible Reading Fellowship.
