= Cowplain =

Village in Hampshire, England

Coordinates: 50.9019°N 1.0123°W

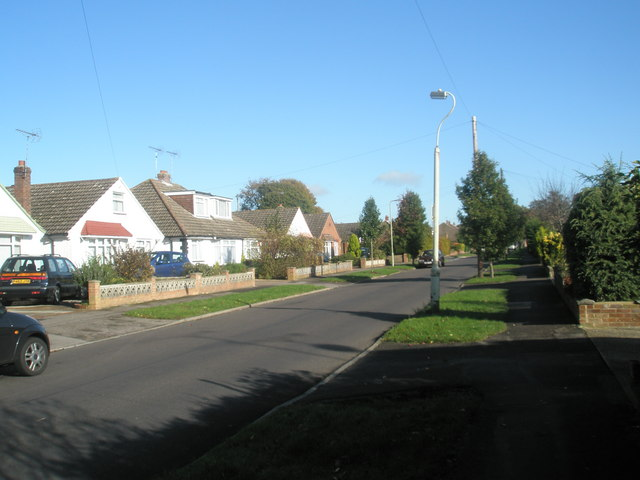
- Cherry Tree Avenue

- Location within Hampshire
- Population: 9,353 (2011.ward)
- OS grid reference: SU695118
- District: Havant
- Shire county: Hampshire
- Region: South East
- Country: England
- Sovereign state: United Kingdom
- Post town: WATERLOOVILLE
- Postcode district: PO8
- Dialling code: 023
- Police: Hampshire and Isle of Wight
- Fire: Hampshire and Isle of Wight
- Ambulance: South Central
- UK Parliament: Fareham and Waterlooville

Cowplain is a village located north of Waterlooville, Hampshire, in South East England. According to the 2011 United Kingdom census, Cowplain is reported to have a population of 9,353, which constitutes 7% of the total population of the Borough of Havant. The village is spread along the A3 road connecting London to Portsmouth.

== Geography ==
In 1810, the area which would become the village site was recorded as part of the formerly uninterrupted Forest of Bere. The only existing building at the time was Padnell Brick Kiln (later renamed Padnell Farm, then Padnell Grange). The village is located in a partially forested area, of which The Queen's Inclosure, Padnell Cuts Woods, Idlewood, Hurstwood, and Park Woods are portions. The village was founded at the foot of the nearby hill, where The Spotted Cow Pub was originally built (c. 1860), from which the village's name is believed to have originated. Villages situated in close proximity of Cowplain are Lovedean, Rowland's Castle, Denmead and Horndean. Wecock Farm, a 1970s Portsmouth City Council housing estate, is located west of Cowplain.

== Services ==
Cowplain has several schools, including Cowplain School, Padnell Infant and Junior Schools, Hartplain Infant and Junior Schools, and Queen's Inclosure Primary School, which is adjacent to The Queen's Inclosure. Cowplain is also home to St. Wilfrid's Church, Cowplain Evangelical Church, the Waterlooville Golf Course, and a supermarket, formerly a Fine Fare store until its closure in 1988, which itself replaced the Harcourt stores at the Fernwood house development. The "Messy Church" movement began in 2004 among a group from St. Wilfrid's Church.

== Transport ==
The construction of the Portsdown & Horndean Light Railway in 1903 accelerated the village's growth. The former tramline followed the route of the main A3 road and traversed Cowplain, where the main tram depot was built, before the line closed in 1935.

Subsequently, the tramline was replaced by the No. 42 Southdown bus, which was recently renumbered as No. 8. Cowplain is also served by the No. 37 bus passing from Havant to Clanfield and from Petersfield and Liss, the National Express No. 030 from Cowsplain to London, the No. 39 passing through Wecock Farm, and the First Group service 8 which follows the A3 from Clanfield to Gunwharf Quays in Portsmouth.

Train stations in close proximity of Cowplain include Havant Railway Station and Cosham Railway Station.

== Notable people ==
- Mark Wingett, an English actor known for playing Police Constable Jim Carver in The Bill, who attended Padnell Junior School
- Brett Fancy, an English actor known for playing detective Steve Hood in Rockliffe's Babies and with several subsequent film roles, who attended Padnell Junior School
- Jill Ellis, an English-American football coach, who attended Padnell Junior School and Cowplain School
- Peter Lynn, a social statistician and Professor at the University of Essex, who attended Padnell Infant and Junior schools
- Gareth Southgate, an English footballer and team manager, who lived on the Hazleton Estate and briefly attended Padnell Infant school
- Reuben Brampton Corkrey, a Paymaster Lieutenant in the Royal Navy, who lived in Cowplain and was appointed Member of the Order of the British Empire (MBE) in the King's 1944 Birthday Honours
