= Warblington Castle =

Moated manor in Hampshire, England

- Hampshire, England
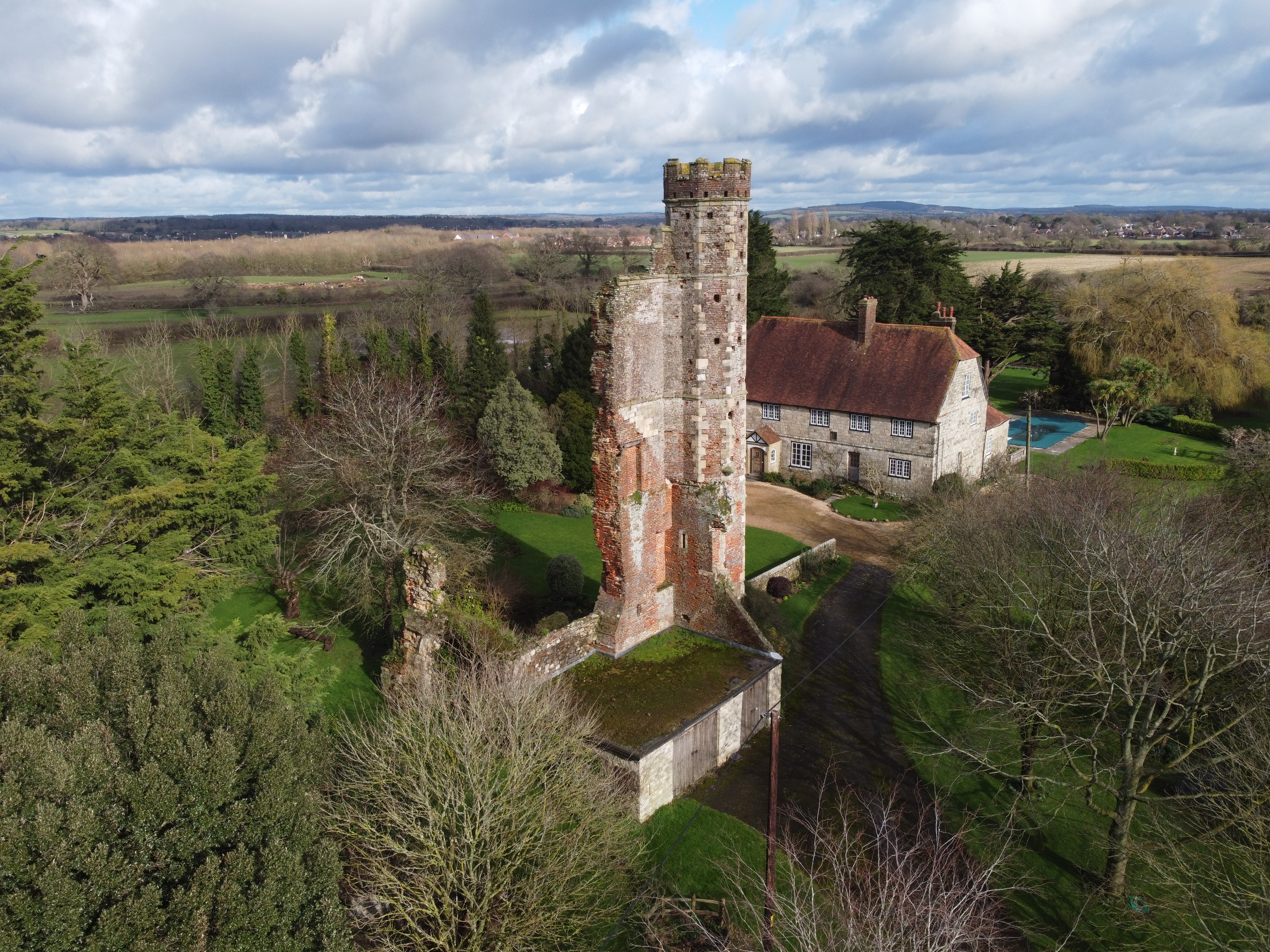
- Part of the remains of Warblington Castle

Site information
- Type: Fortified manor house
- Condition: Ruined

Location
- Shown within Hampshire
- Coordinates: 50.8444°N 0.9659°W
- Grid reference: grid reference SU729055

Warblington Castle or Warblington manor was a moated manor near Langstone in Havant parish, Hampshire. Most of the castle was destroyed during the English Civil War, leaving only a single gate tower, part of a wall, and a gateway. The property, now in the village of Warblington, is privately owned and does not allow for public access.

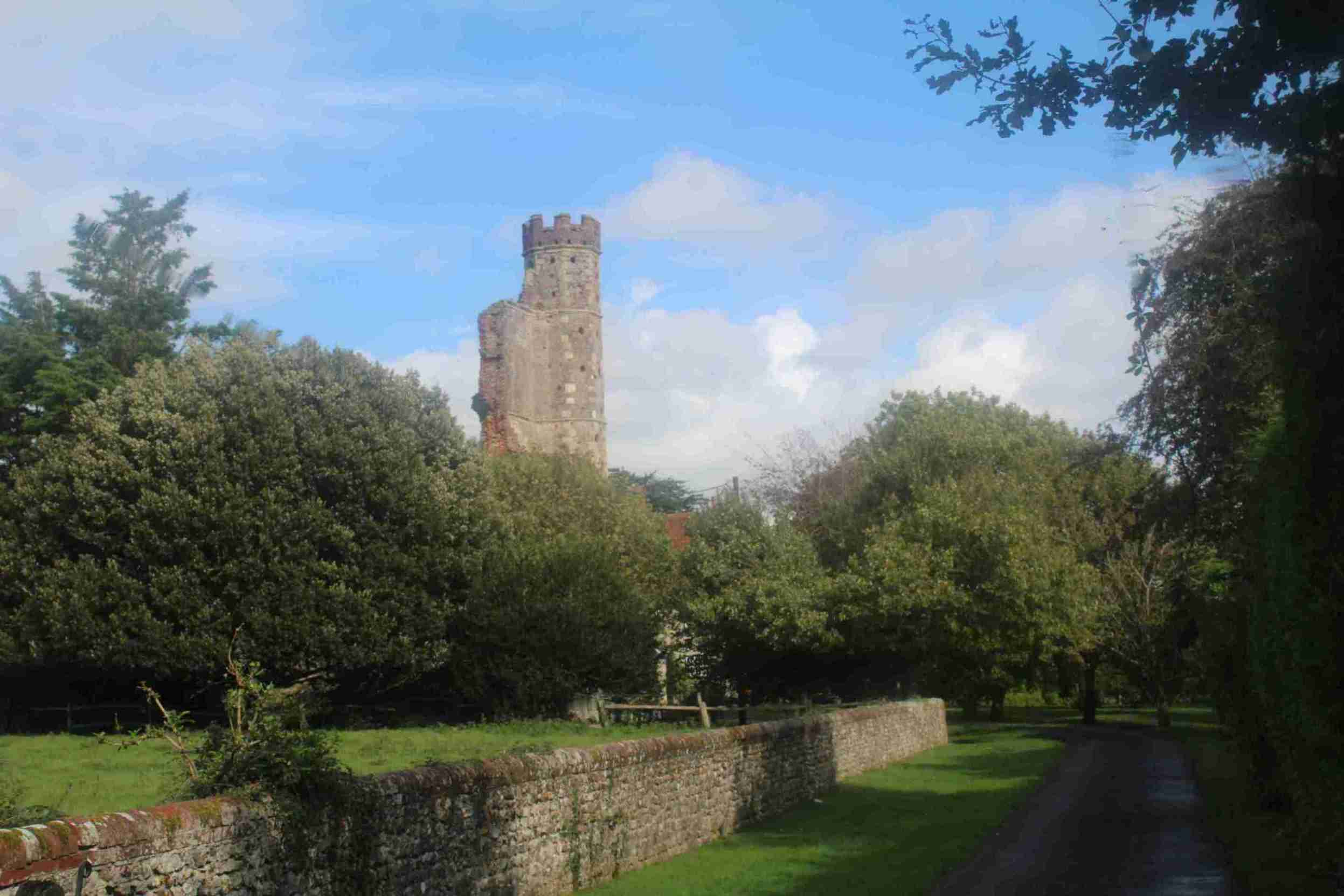
Castle remains in 2021

== Early history ==
Located near Langstone in Hampshire, a Saxon settlement was established in the 7th century. It is mentioned in the Domesday Book of 1086, indicating a population of about 120.

The owner of the property at the time was Roger, Earl of Shrewsbury; after his death in 1094, it was inherited by his second son, Hugh. The owner in 1186 was William de Courci.

Some sources claim that the manor received a licence to crenellate in 1340 but this is disputed. The manor passed through several hands before coming into the possession of Richard Neville, 16th Earl of Warwick, in the 15th century. The villagers were subsequently removed, the land becoming a private deer park for Neville.

With the execution of Edward Plantagenet, 17th Earl of Warwick, by Henry VII, the manor passed to the crown. In 1513 Henry VIII gave the manor to Margaret Pole, Countess of Salisbury, who had a new moated manor built between 1515 and 1525.

After Margaret Pole was attainted for treason, temporary grants of the manor were made to William FitzWilliam, 1st Earl of Southampton, and Thomas Wriothesley, 1st Earl of Southampton. Henry VIII then granted the manor to Sir Richard Cotton. On 28 October 1551, Mary of Guise, the widow of James V of Scotland, stayed a night in the castle as the guest of Sir Richard Cotton. Edward VI visited the "fair house of Sir Richard Cotton" in August 1552.

Elizabeth I may have visited for two days in 1586. George Cotton of Warblington was a Catholic recusant, visited by priests including Thomas Lister alias Butler in 1603, and in 1613 a reliquary of a martyr Mark Barkworth was found in John Cotton's study. The Cotton family continued to hold the house until the English civil war.

In January 1643 Parliamentarians under Colonel Richard Norton of Southwick Park garrisoned the house with a force of between 40 and 80 men. It was besieged and taken by Ralph Hopton, 1st Baron Hopton, although Colonel Norton managed to escape.

The Cotton family were Royalists, which resulted in the manor being largely demolished by Parliamentarian forces. One turret of the gatehouse was left as an aid to navigation for ships in Langstone channel. The turret is octagonal in form and four stories in height. It is largely built from brick with stone dressing and battlements. After the Stuart Restoration, the property was returned to the Cotton family who built a farmhouse near the ruin. The latter is now Grade II listed.

Today, the turret, the arch of the gate and the drawbridge support in the moat still survive. The land remains private property. The remains of the castle is a grade II* listed building and a scheduled monument. The Listing specifics define it as a "gateway tower, including the moulded stone arch of the gate, some of the south wall of the tower, a complete south-east octagonal stair turret, of 5 storeys, and part of the east wall (facing the courtyard)".

The castle is located within the Warblington Conservation Area which also contains the adjoining Old Farm House, an old cemetery, the Grade I listed St Thomas à Becket Church, Warblington and the Old Rectory.

As of May 2020, the owners of the castle were retired Olympic rowers Tom and Diana Bishop who live in the seven bedroom Old Farm House on the property. At that time, the property also included four acres of gardens, an orchard and a swimming pool.

The tower was notably featured in a scene from Ken Russell's 1975 film of The Who's rock opera Tommy, when Roger Daltrey leapt off the top strapped to a hang glider to the song "Sensation".

== See also ==
- Castles in Great Britain and Ireland
- List of castles in England
