= Waterlooville =

Town in Hampshire, England

Coordinates: 50.88°N 1.03°W

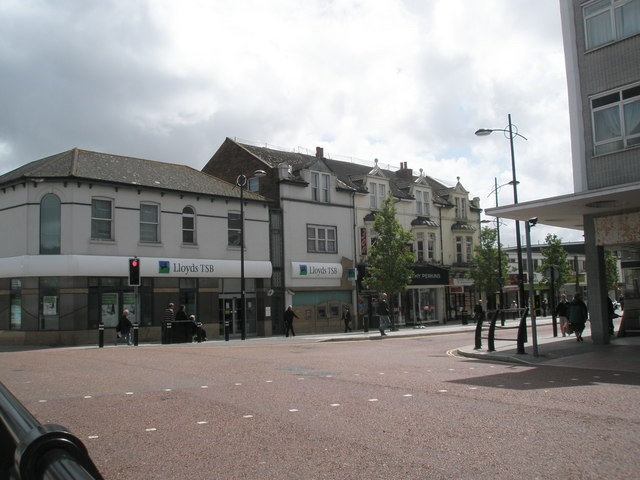
- London Road

- Location within Hampshire
- Population: 34,775 (2021 census)
- OS grid reference: SU682092
- District: Havant
- Shire county: Hampshire
- Region: South East
- Country: England
- Sovereign state: United Kingdom
- Post town: Waterlooville
- Postcode district: PO7 & PO8
- Dialling code: 023
- Police: Hampshire and Isle of Wight
- Fire: Hampshire and Isle of Wight
- Ambulance: South Central
- UK Parliament: Fareham and Waterlooville; Havant

Waterlooville is a town in the Borough of Havant in Hampshire, England, about 6 miles (9.7 km) northeast of Portsmouth. It is the largest town in the borough. The Waterlooville built-up area had a population of 34,775 in the 2021 census. It is surrounded by Purbrook, Blendworth, Cowplain, Lovedean, Clanfield, Catherington, Crookhorn, Denmead, Hambledon, Horndean and Widley. It forms part of the South Hampshire conurbation. The town formed around the old A3 London to Portsmouth road.

== History ==
It is reputed that the name derived from a pub that stood at the centre of the town, then known as Wait Lane End, where the stage-coach horses waited to change places with the team that pulled the coach up and over Portsdown Hill. The pub had been named Heroes of Waterloo because, on its opening day in 1815, soldiers who had just disembarked at Portsmouth, returning from the Battle of Waterloo, decided to stop there and celebrate their victory. According to local legend, many of them settled there. The pub was thereafter renamed in their honour and the area around the pub became known as Waterloo. In order to differentiate the town from other places with the same name, it became known as Waterlooville at a later date. The town was known as Waterloo parish at the time of the 1911 Census.

In June 2015 Waterlooville town celebrated its first 200 years, its origins and history in a festival called Waterlooville 200.

The town centre was closed to traffic in 1985 when a bypass was constructed to take traffic away from the main shopping area. The bypass, initially anonymous, was named Maurepas Way sometime after the two towns were twinned in 1995. An underpass was constructed for pedestrians walking up along the Hambledon Road. In 1982 and 1983 the old road was fully converted to a pedestrian precinct. The precinct had a fountain and raised area at the northern end, near the Heroes pub; however, regular vandalism of the fountain soon resulted in its removal. In August 2012 the northern part of the precinct received a £700,000 renovation and repaving, increasing the area available to the weekly Friday market.

GEC Marconi built a site at Waterlooville for their Underwater Systems Division in the early 1980s, for the Stingray anti-submarine torpedo. A peace camp was set up near the construction site. After completion of the GEC building, a free music festival was held at Old Park Farm in Waterlooville called Torpedo Town. A second Torpedo Town festival was held in August 1987 at Bramdean Common near Winchester.

Near the town centre is St George's Church, rebuilt in 1968–70 around the core of the original (1830) church. Waterlooville Baptist Church was built in 1967 in a modernist style to replace the original chapel of 1884–85 in the town centre. During the 1950s and 1960s the surrounding area saw extensive growth in housing, when large suburban public and private housing estates were constructed. This resulted in the original Victorian church failing to cope with the population growth. Plans for a new church were started and in 1970 the new church was built on the site of the old church. Parts of the old church were retained. In July 2011 the town saw the consecration of its first Roman Catholic Church.

== Climate ==
Waterlooville has a temperate oceanic climate (Köppen climate classification Cfb), similar to much of southern Britain. However, the climate in the area does have mild differences between highs and lows. with chilly winters and warm summers. In January and February average nighttime minimum temperatures drop to about 2 to 1 °C (36 to 34 °F), whereas in July and August average daytime maximum temperatures are around 23 to 24 °C (73 to 75 °F). Although 30 °C (86 °F) is common in July and August, the area rarely achieves above 35 °C (95 °F). In fact, in the last century there have only been two days in June 1976, one day in August 1990 and one day in August 2003 where temperatures reached over 35 °C (95 °F). The highest recorded temperature was around 37 °C (99 °F) on 10 August 2003. In contrast, the lowest recorded temperature was on 12 January 1987, when the temperature dipped to −10 °C (14 °F).

During winter, Waterlooville tends to have more frost than nearby Portsmouth as it has fewer influences from the sea and is more exposed to northerly winds. However, highs in the summer are slightly warmer than Portsmouth because there is less influence of cool breezes from the English Channel as the town is more inland. Sunshine averages are typical of that across the Portsmouth area, Isle of Wight and the south-west Sussex coast of around 1800 – 2100 hours of sunshine a year, where southwesterly winds keep the sunshine hours up between late March and mid September; the town is also protected by the South Downs.

== Transport ==
The main shopping precinct is served by First Hampshire & Dorset bus routes 7, 8, The X9 route has been discontinued and replaced by the D1 and D2 service which runs from Hambledon and Denmead and goes to Waterlooville town centre, and Stagecoach South services 37 and 39. The A3 Bus Corridor priority route (constructed between 2003 and 2007) serves the town. As of 2006, the shopping precinct is closed to all road traffic other than buses.

The nearest railway station is Bedhampton and is on the main train route between London and Portsmouth. For a time, South Western Railway provided a direct bus link to Petersfield railway station via Horndean, enabling quick access to fast London-bound trains, but now the link to Petersfield is Stagecoach service 37 via Clanfield. Havant railway station is served by Stagecoach service 39, and stations in Portsmouth by First services 7 and 8. For westbound trains the station at Cosham, served by the local bus services, is on the line between Portsmouth and Fareham, with regular trains to Southampton and Cardiff.

== Media ==
Local news and television programmes are provided by BBC South and ITV Meridian. Television signals are received from the Rowridge TV transmitter.

Local radio stations are BBC Radio Solent on 96.1 FM, Heart South on 97.5 FM, Capital South on 103.2 FM, Easy Radio South Coast on 107.4 FM, Nation Radio South Coast on 106.0 FM, Radio Victory on 95.8 FM, and The Flash, a community based radio station which broadcast on DAB.

The town is served by the local newspaper, The News.

== Sport ==
Waterlooville has a swimming pool which is used by Havant and Waterlooville Swimming Club.

Waterlooville Cricket Club plays its home games at Jubilee Park. It runs three Saturday sides and has a youth set-up. The 1st XI currently competes in the Southern Premier Cricket League Division 2 with other sides spread across the Hampshire League spectrum.

There is a bowls club with a carpet green in Jubilee Park.

Havant & Waterlooville football club, which plays in Havant, was formed in 1998 after a merger between Havant Town and Waterlooville.

Waterlooville AFC was founded in 2025, and is set to play their matches under a groundsharing agreement with fellow club AFC Portchester.

== Governance ==
The area is mainly unparished, therefore Waterlooville does not have its own parish council or town council. However, part of Waterlooville is in the district of Winchester City Council, which is parished, and therefore includes the parish of Newlands. The first tier of local government is the Borough of Havant, with councillors elected for its Waterloo, Hart Plain, Cowplain, and Stakes wards. The upper tier is Hampshire County Council; the town centre is combined with Stakes North as the single-councillor division of Waterlooville and Stakes North, while another division covers Cowplain and Hart Plain.

For representation to the House of Commons, Waterlooville falls within the Fareham and Waterlooville constituency.

Waterloo was formerly an extra-parochial chapelry. In 1858 Waterloo became a separate civil parish, and on 1 April 1932 the parish was abolished and merged with Havant, part also went to from Southwick and Widley. In 1931 the parish had a population of 1250.

== Education ==
Waterlooville contains ten primary schools: Morelands Primary School, Meadowlands Junior and Infants School, Padnell Infants and Junior School, Hart Plain Infants and Junior schools, Springwood Infant School (formerly Stakes Hill Infant School), Springwood Junior School (formerly Hulbert Junior School), Mill Hill Primary School (formerly Waite End Infants and Waite End Junior School and Waite End Primary School), Purbrook Infant and Junior Schools, Queens Inclosure Primary and St. Peter's Catholic Primary.

Two new two form entry primary schools are to be built in the new housing development area situated off the Maurepas Roundabout. The first of these is scheduled to open in September 2014 with a possible Year R only intake depending on the number of children needing places.

It contains five secondary schools: Horndean Technology College, The Cowplain School, Oaklands Catholic School, Purbrook Park School and Crookhorn College.

There are two colleges, Oaklands Catholic Sixth Form College and South Downs College.

== Notable residents ==
- Christopher Hitchens (1949–2011), writer, born in Waterlooville
- Lewis Ganson (1913–1980), one of the most prolific writers in magic
- Michael Giles, drummer for King Crimson, born in Waterlooville
- James Edward Ignatius Masterson (1862–1935), awarded the Victoria Cross in 1900, retired to, and died in Waterlooville
- General Sir Charles James Napier (1782–1853), retired to, and died in Waterlooville; his former house is now part of Oaklands School
- Beatrice Shilling (1909–1990), aeronautical engineer, born in Waterlooville
- Rob Styles, retired FIFA and FA Premier League Referee
- Simon Whitlock, darts player, born in Cessnock, Australia
- Mark Harmsworth, Washington State Representative, USA
- Mason Mount, Premier League footballer, born in Portsmouth, attended Purbrook Park School

== See also ==
- List of places of worship in the Borough of Havant
