= Crookhorn College =

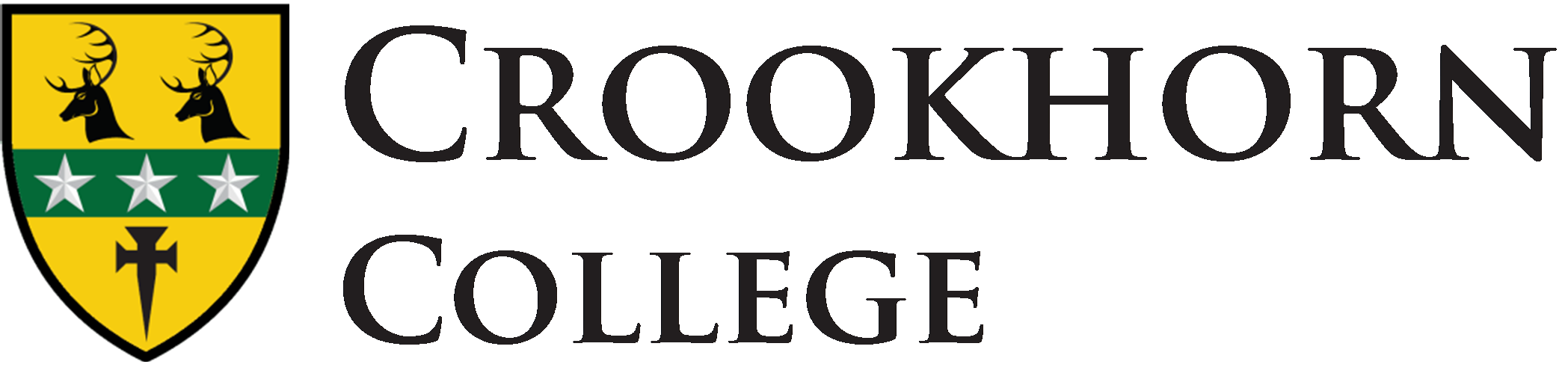

Location
- Stakes Hill Road; Waterlooville, Hampshire, PO7 5UD; England
- Coordinates: 50.866°N 1.025°W

Information
- Type: Foundation school
- Local authority: Hampshire
- Department for Education URN: 116428 Tables
- Ofsted: Reports
- Headteacher: Sarah Bennett
- Gender: Coeducational
- Age: 11 to 16
- Enrolment: 876 as of January 2023
- Website: http://www.crookhorn.hants.sch.uk/

Crookhorn College is a coeducational foundation secondary school, located in Waterlooville in the English county of Hampshire.

It is administered by Hampshire County Council, which coordinates the schools admissions. Previously known as Crookhorn Community School, it gained specialist Technology College status and was renamed Crookhorn College of Technology. It is now named Crookhorn College.

Crookhorn College offers GCSEs as programmes of study for pupils, as well as some vocational courses in conjunction with South Downs College.
