= Lovedean =

Village in Hampshire, England

Coordinates: 50.91155°N 1.02731°W

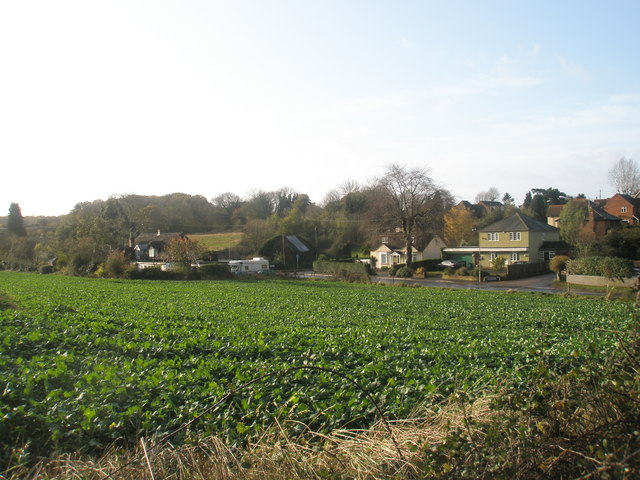
- View from Coldhill Lane towards Lovedean Lane

- Location within Hampshire
- OS grid reference: SU684129
- Civil parish: Horndean
- District: East Hampshire
- Shire county: Hampshire
- Region: South East
- Country: England
- Sovereign state: United Kingdom
- Post town: WATERLOOVILLE
- Postcode district: PO8
- Dialling code: 023
- Police: Hampshire and Isle of Wight
- Fire: Hampshire and Isle of Wight
- Ambulance: South Central
- UK Parliament: East Hampshire

Lovedean is a village in the East Hampshire district of Hampshire, England. It is 1.4 miles (2.2 km) west of Horndean.

The nearest railway station is Rowlands Castle, 2.8 miles (4.6 km) southeast of the village. Although this is the nearest it is not readily accessible by public transport, for public transport the best is Cosham

The village of Lovedean is situated around the main road Lovedean Lane, situated at the bottom of the valley after which it is named. Dean is from the old English word Denu, meaning valley. [The name Lovedean derives from a marriage in 1594 when Isabel Norton married Thomas Loveden [sic], and included in the dowry was part of the Manor of Catherington plus an area known as the Manor of Lovedean]

Lovedean Village Hall is well used, there were two pubs, The Green Dragon which closed December 2011, and became a Tesco Express March 2012, and The Bird in Hand The Bird in Hand is owned by the same company that runs the Hurdles, a similar pub in Droxford as well as a few shops. The FA Cup trophy was hidden at The Bird in Hand during the Second World War, having been won by Portsmouth a few months before the outbreak of the war in 1939. Lovedean is home to Woodcroft Primary School and has a sizeable 400 kV electrical substation.

Lovedean is described as a "manor of Catherington" on the British History Online website here
