= Wecock Farm =

Neighbourhood of Waterlooville, Hampshire, England

Coordinates: 50.89°N 1.033°W

- Location within Hampshire
- Population: Approx 5000
- OS grid reference: SU680110
- District: Waterlooville
- Shire county: Hampshire
- Region: South East
- Country: England
- Sovereign state: United Kingdom
- Post town: Waterlooville
- Postcode district: PO8
- Dialling code: (023)
- Police: Hampshire and Isle of Wight
- Fire: Hampshire and Isle of Wight
- Ambulance: South Central

Wecock Farm is a 1970s council estate on the western edges of Waterlooville originally built by Portsmouth City Council. Its lineage can be traced back to the 16th century and is described as 'a place called Wycock' in 1591.
