= Alan Balfour =

Scottish writer

- Born: 1939 (age 86–87); Edinburgh, Scotland
- Occupations: Architect, Educator, Author
- Awards: Topaz Medallion (2000)

Academic background
- Education: Edinburgh College of Art; Princeton University

Academic work
- Discipline: Architecture
- Institutions: Arthur D. Little<br/>MIT<br/>Harvard<br/>Georgia Tech<br/>Rice University<br/>Rensselaer Polytechnic Institute<br/>Architectural Association School of Architecture<br/>American Academy in Rome<br/>UNSW<br/>Tongji University

Alan Balfour (born 1939 in Edinburgh, Scotland) is an Emeritus Professor of Architecture and award-winning author of books on architecture and the cultural imagination.

Alan Balfour's work explores the relationship between cities and their buildings and desires in the culture that shaped them. A central theme in his writing is the concept of man-made environments as "landscapes of desire," reflecting both positive and negative aspects of society. Balfour's approach integrates architectural analysis with social history, examining how the physical characteristics of cities and buildings embody prevalent cultural and societal desires. This theme is exemplified in two of his works, Berlin: The Politics of Order and Classical Edinburgh: A City Divided.

Balfour's books are notable for their equal emphasis on architectural details and social historical context, providing a comprehensive view of urban development and its cultural significance.

== Early life and education ==
Balfour was born in Edinburgh in March 1939. He attended The Royal High School in Edinburgh, and studied architecture at the Edinburgh College of Art, where he was awarded the Edinburgh Silver Medal for Civic Design.

After Edinburgh he went on to study architecture at Princeton University on a Fulbright Fellowship. He received a Master of Fine Arts Degree in the summer of 1965.

== Research and educator ==
In 1970 Balfour returned to the United States to join the professional staff of Arthur D. Little (ADL). Significant among the research projects he was involved with was the HUD-funded, evaluation of "Project Rehab", which looked at the results of housing rehabilitation in 14 cities and the Solar Climate Control Industry Study, led by the solar engineer, Peter Glaser. In 1974 he taught a graduate studio at MIT based on the ADL research. Following this he managed the Architecture Education Study (AES), a project of MIT and Harvard for the Consortium of Eastern Schools of Architecture.

He has been dean of schools of architecture in the US including the Georgia Tech, Rice University and Rensselaer Polytechnic Institute. In 1991, he was elected Chairman of the Architectural Association School of Architecture in London.

Over these years he has also taught and lectured internationally. He was a guest at the American Academy in Rome in 2001 and visiting professor at UNSW in Sydney, Australia in 2007. In 2013 was appointed Advisory Professor in the College of Architecture, and Urban Planning, Tongji University, Shanghai, China. He has served on international juries including at the World Architecture Festival gatherings in Singapore and Berlin.

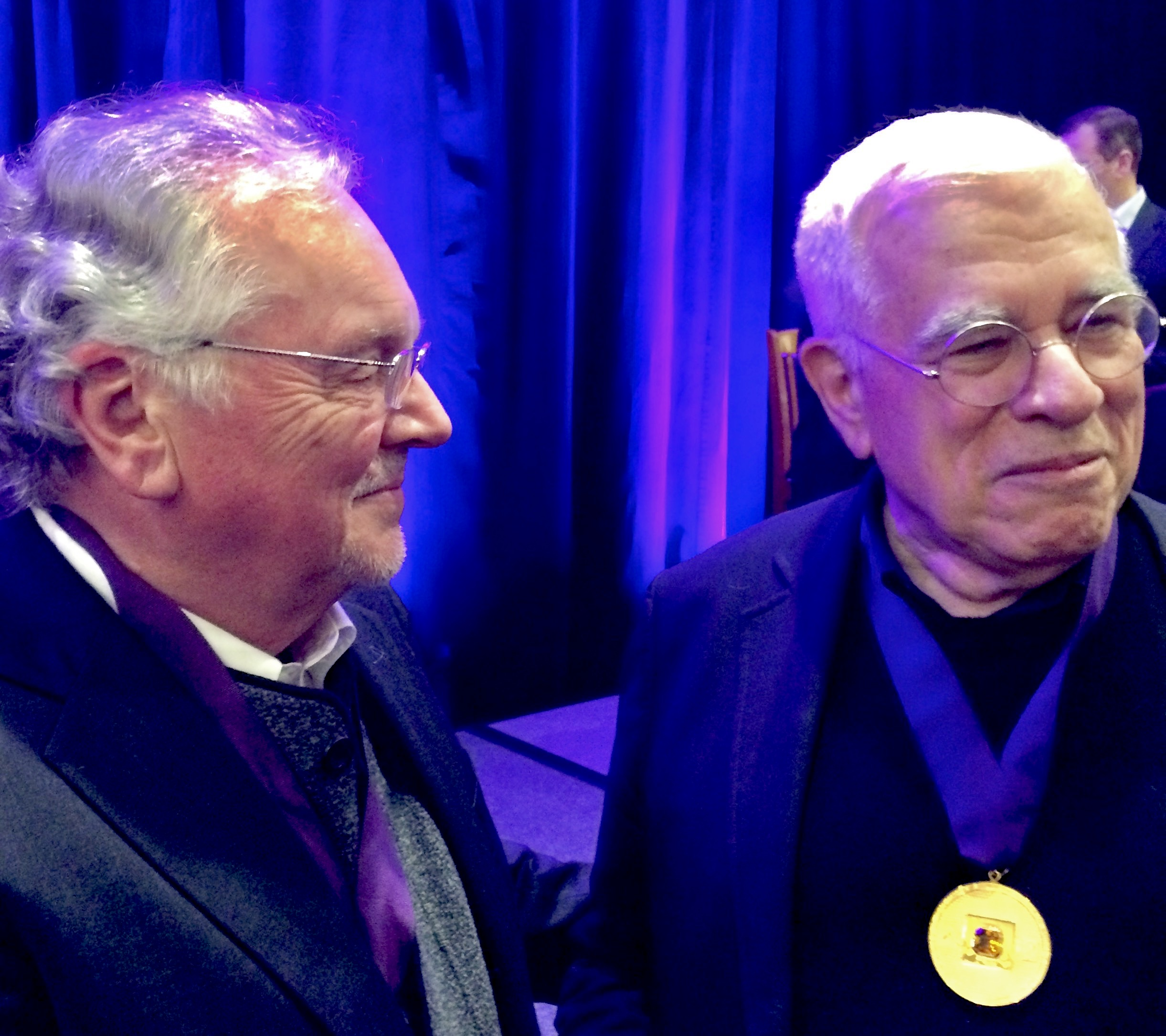
Topaz Medalian Winners – Alan Balfour with Peter Eisenman

Balfour was the year 2000 recipient of the Topaz Medallion, the highest recognition given in North America to an educator in architecture. It is given jointly by the American Institute of Architects (AIA) and the American Collegiate Schools of Architecture.

== Works ==
=== Books ===
- Portsmouth (London: Studio Vista, 1970)
- Rockefeller Center : architecture as theater (McGraw-Hill, 1978) ISBN 9780070034808
- Berlin : the politics of order 1737-1989 (New York: Rizzoli, 1990) ISBN 9780847812714
- This and the later book on the city, received AIA International Book Awards
- Berlin, World Cities (Academy Editions London, and Ernst & Sohn, Berlin, 1995) ISBN 9781854903747
- Shanghai, with Zheng Shiling. (London: Wiley-Academy, 2002) ISBN 9780471877332
- New York, World Cities (Chichester : Wiley Academy, c2000) ISBN 9780471489450
- Creating a Scottish Parliament, with a foreword by George Reid; and an introduction by David McCrone. (Edinburgh: Finlay Brown, 2005) ISBN 9780955001604
- Solomon's temple : myth, conflict, and faith (Hoboken: Wiley-Blackwell, 2013) ISBN 9781119000587
- The walls of Jerusalem : preserving the past, controlling the future, (Hoboken, NJ: John Wiley & Sons, 2019) ISBN 9781119182290
- Classical Edinburgh : a city divided (London: First Hill Books, 2023) ISBN 9781839987892

=== Articles and other writing ===
- Contributions to Breakthrough to the Hudson, (designed by Ladislav Sutnar) Ottinger Foundation, New York, 1964
- Solar Energy and Survival ON SITE ON ENERGY, Site Inc. Y 1974
- Captive of Love and Ignorance Architectural Education Study, MIT, Boston, 1981
- The High Museum Architectural Review February 1984
- Contributions to Contemporary Architects, St. Martin’s Press, New York, 1984, revised 1987(essays on John Hedjuk, James Polchek
- On the Characteristics and Beliefs of the Architect. JAE Journal of Architectural Education Volume 2/40 Jubilee 1987
- From 1991 -1995 Balfour redesigned the Architectural Association’s annual publications and was publisher and had overall editorial responsibility for AA Publications, he also led the editorial board of AA Files.
- Hot House or Madhouse Martin Pawley, British Vogue, August 1992
- Spiritual Constructions, The Edge of the Millennium, Whitney Library of Design, New York, 1993.
- Documents of a Creative Process, Cities of Artificial Excavation: The Work of Peter Eisenman 1978-1988, CCA Montreal, Rizzoli International Publications, New York, 1994
- Architecture for a New Nation in Bioclimatic Architecture Ken Yeang, Singapore 1994
- Effect OVERLOAD, HDA Dokumente zur Architektur 7. Graz 1996
- Studio Works: 4 Approaches. Harvard University Graduate School, 1996. (the work of his Harvard graduate studio)
- What is Public Landscape Recovering Landscape edited with James Corner, Princeton Architectural Press, 1999
- The Walls of Jerusalem Ajman International Urban Planning Conference, City and Security Ajman UAE 2013
- Shanghai and Berlin TA Time +Architecture (A journal of Tongji University, Shanghai) 2014/3
- Dreams in Reality, TA, Time +Architecture, 2014/4
- Reading Berlin WAF (World Architectural Festival), Berlin 216
- Mendelsohn and the Center for Creative Arts: in INVISIBLE, Heather Woofter, Sung Ho Kim, 2023

=== Videos ===
- Peter Eisenman – In Conversation with Alan Balfour AA School of Architecture 1993 www.youtube.com
- Six Modern Landscapes Part 3 – Alan Balfour, Denis Cosgrove, Adrien Hemming, James Corner. 1995 www.youtube.com
- Reading Berlin Alan Balfour's seminar on Berlin opens the second day of World Architecture Festival 2016 www.youtube.com

== Select reviews ==
ROCKEFELLER CENTER, Architecture as Theater: Review by Paul Goldberger, The New York Times Book Review, July 1979

Mr. Balfour knows what a stroke of luck the center's greatness was; he states that "far from being the result of cautious planning, the whole development . . . was instead the result of coincidence, evolutionary change, and brilliant speculation. The book is realistic and loving, hard-nosed and celebrating, bringing to Rockefeller Center the qualities that the center itself brings to city life.

BERLIN The Politics of Order: Review by Craig A. Gordon, historian of German diplomatic history, New York Review of Books, November 1991

A good idea of the grandiosity of Hitler's plans for Berlin and the ruin brought upon the city by his foreign policy is provided by Alan Balfour's book, Berlin: The Politics of Order. This work sets out to view the history of architecture and city planning from the reign of Frederick William I until the breaching of the Wall in 1989, by describing the fortunes of the Leipziger Platz and the Potsdamer Platz, which in the nineteenth and early twentieth centuries formed the hub of Berlin’s vehicular traffic and an important commercial and entertainment centers, but were then destroyed by Allied bombing because of their proximity to Hitler’s bunker and were finally divided by the Wall.

SOLOMON'S TEMPLE Myth, Conflict, and Faith: Review by Denis R. McNamara, Institute for Sacred Architecture Journal, Volume 24

The book's strength lies in its readable delineation of the Temple Mount's historical timeline. Many primary sources weave together to provide different views of the same historical events as told through the eyes of Jews, Christians, and Muslims. A compact synopsis handy for the reader interested in an introduction to the complex cultural forces of Jewish law, Hellenization, the conflict between Romans and Jews, and the emergence of Islam, it draws from hard-to-find texts and frequently proves useful for understanding biblical narratives. The Temple as object of the Christian imagination in the time of the Renaissance also proves extremely useful as an architectural typology very little discussed by architectural historians.

== Personal life ==
In 1968 he married Anne (née Rawlinson). They have two children.
