= Fleet, Hayling Island =

Hamlet in Hampshire, England

Coordinates: 50.819859°N 0.981320°W

Fleet
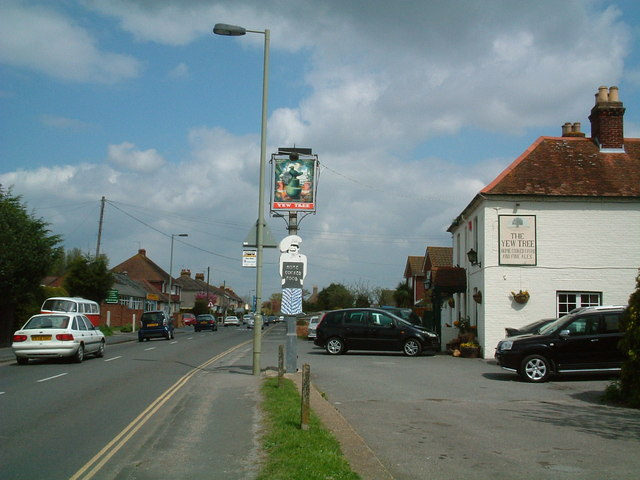
- The Yew Tree

- Location within Hampshire
- OS grid reference: SU7185402751
- District: Havant
- Shire county: Hampshire
- Region: South East
- Country: England
- Sovereign state: United Kingdom
- Post town: HAYLING ISLAND
- Postcode district: PO11
- Dialling code: 023
- Police: Hampshire and Isle of Wight
- Fire: Hampshire and Isle of Wight
- Ambulance: South Central
- UK Parliament: Havant

Fleet is a hamlet near Stoke on Hayling Island in Hampshire, England. The hamlet lies approximately 5.1 miles (8.2 km) east from Portsmouth and 1.6 miles (2.6 km) north from South Hayling.

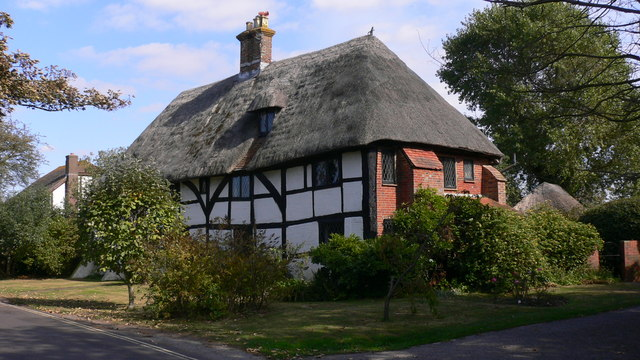
Old Fleet Manor
