= North Hayling railway station =

Former railway station in England

Coordinates: 50.8219°N 0.9831°W

North Hayling
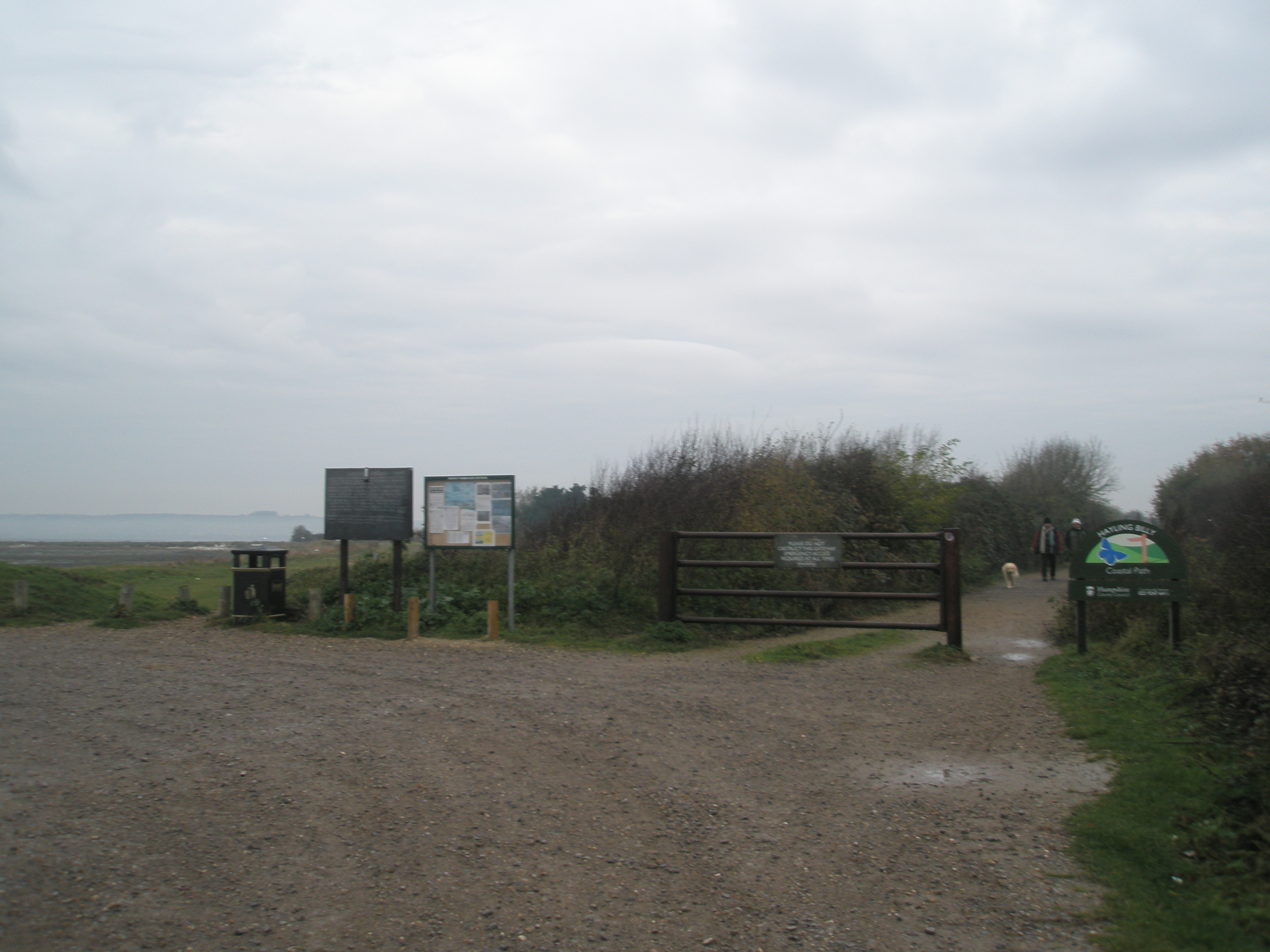
- The site of the station in 2007

General information
- Location: Stoke, Hayling Island, Havant, Hampshire; England
- Grid reference: SU717028
- Platforms: 1

Other information
- Status: Disused

History
- Original company: Hayling Railway
- Pre-grouping: London, Brighton and South Coast Railway
- Post-grouping: Southern Railway; Southern Region of British Railways

Key dates
- 17 July 1867: Opened
- December 1868: closed
- August 1869: opened
- 4 November 1963: Closed
Location

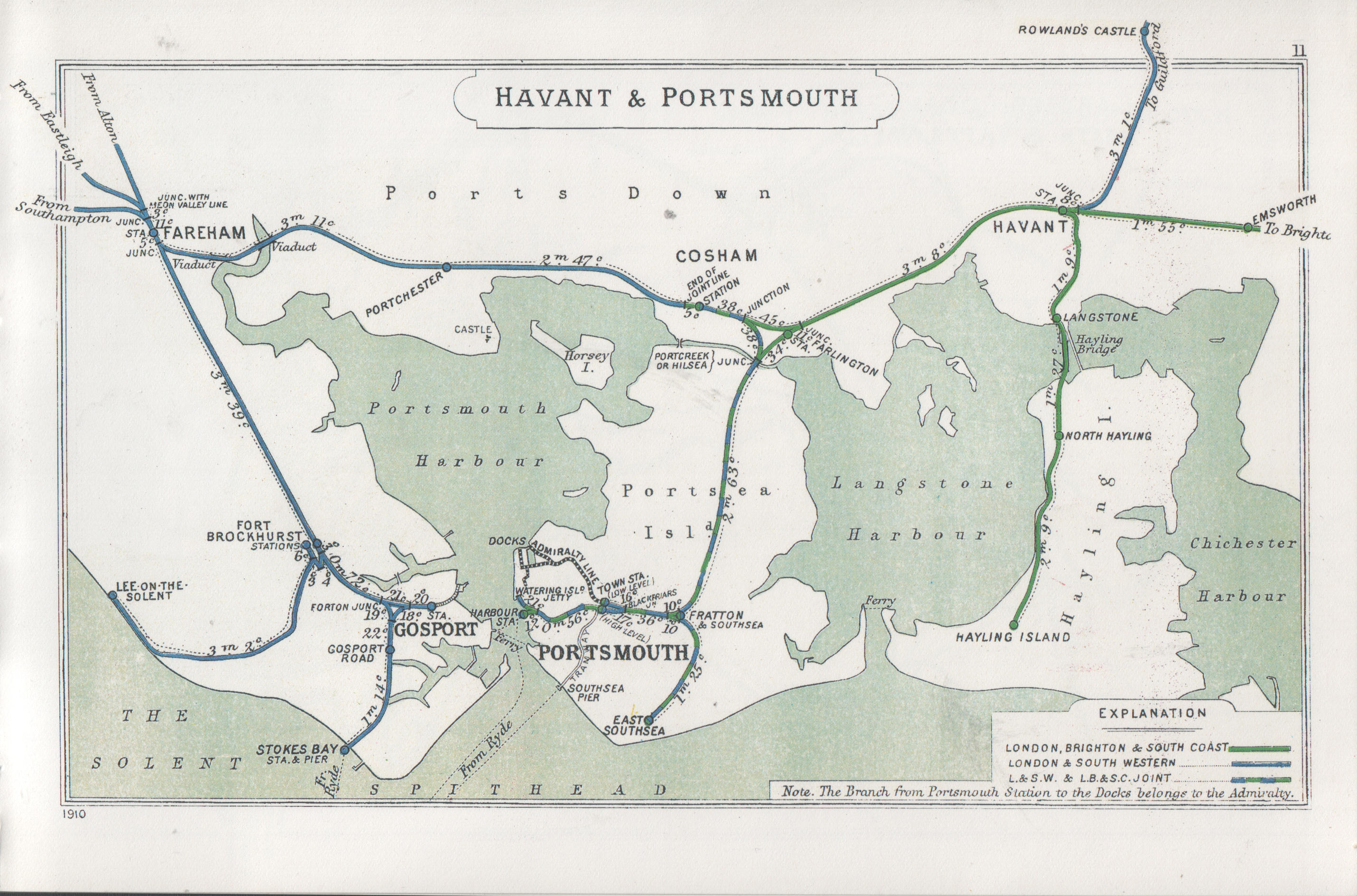
A 1910 Railway Clearing House map of local lines, showing the Hayling Island Branch Line

North Hayling station was a halt on the single track Hayling Island branch, most often used to load oysters caught by local fishermen, but also ornithologists and ramblers. The station, along with the line was closed, in 1963. The station was located on the west coast of Hayling Island, very close to the coast. The station was very basic, with a timber concourse and wooden shelter. The station has been demolished and a section of the trackbed is now a footpath.

Preceding station	Disused railways	Following station
Langston	Southern Region of British Railways; Hayling Island branch line	Hayling Island
