= Hayling Island railway station =

Former railway station in England

Coordinates: 50.7933°N 0.9952°W

Hayling Island
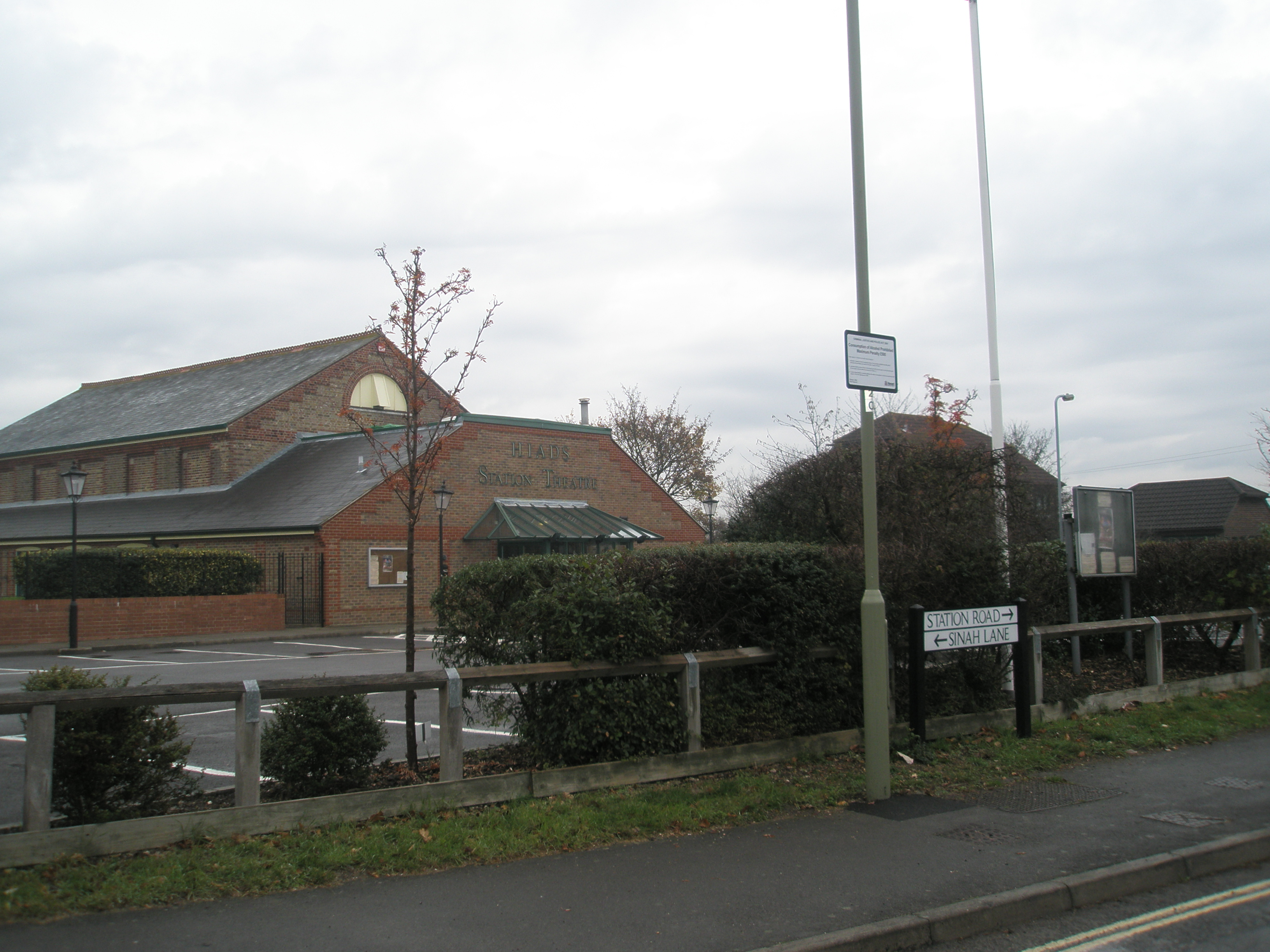
- Former goods shed

General information
- Location: West Town, Hayling Island, Havant; England
- Grid reference: SZ709998
- Platforms: 2

Other information
- Status: Disused

History
- Original company: Hayling Railway
- Pre-grouping: London, Brighton and South Coast Railway
- Post-grouping: Southern Railway; Southern Region of British Railways

Key dates
- January 1865: opened for goods
- 17 July 1867: Opened for passengers as "South Hayling"
- 1 January 1892: Renamed "Hayling Island"
- 4 November 1963: Closed
Location

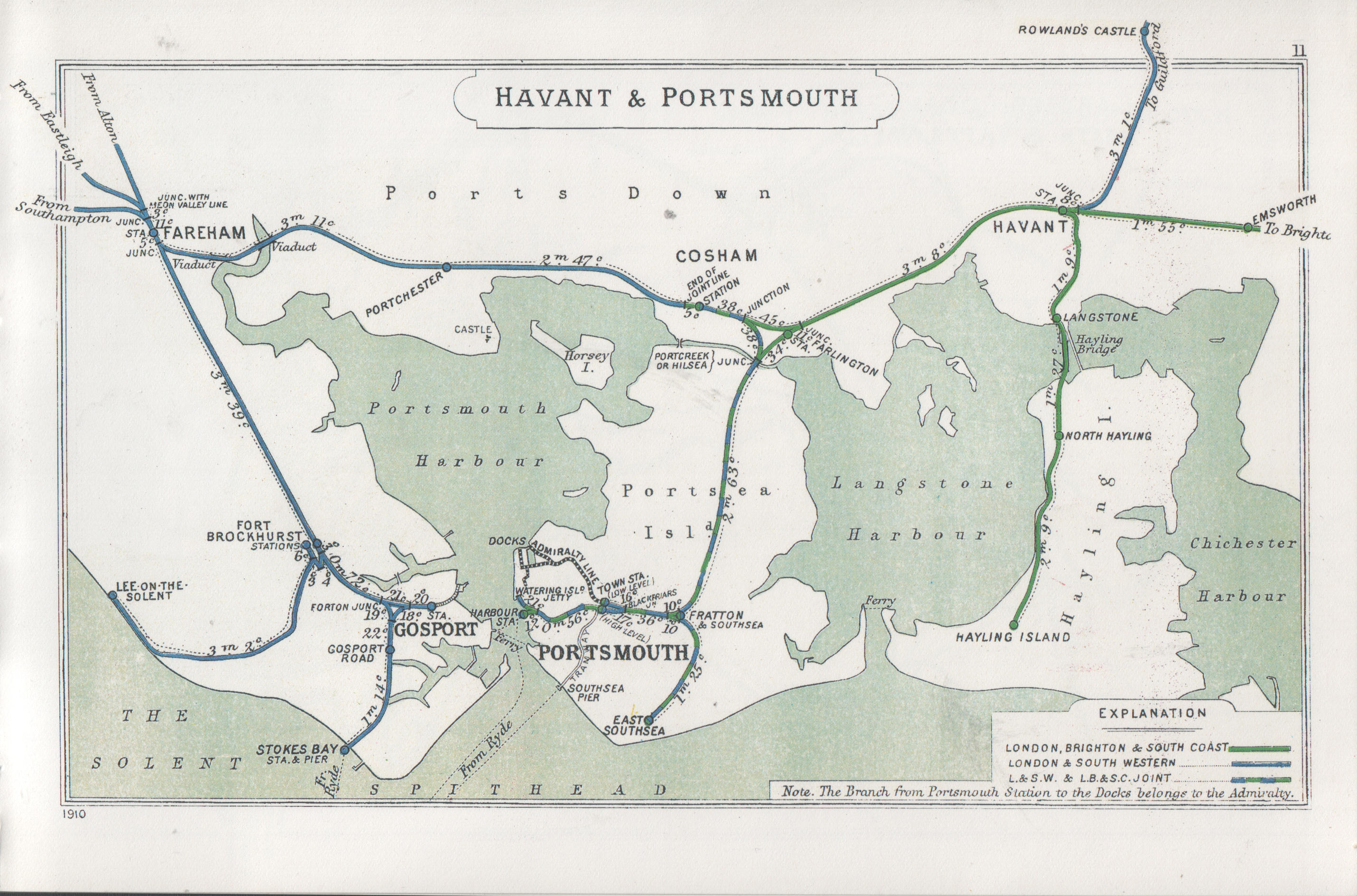
A 1910 Railway Clearing House map of local lines, showing the Hayling Island Branch Line on the right

Hayling Island (called South Hayling until 1892) was a station on Hayling Island in southeastern Hampshire, England. It was opened for passengers in 1867 as the terminus of the four and a half mile Hayling Island branch, a single track line from Havant which transported holidaymakers to the resort until its closure in 1963.

The station had a small wooden coal stage used to refill the bunkers of the A1X steam locomotives working the branch. Goods services, including wagons of coal for the locomotives, continued until the last day of operation.

The only part of the station remaining today is the former goods shed which was incorporated into a theatre, and is a landmark on one end of the Hayling Billy Trail.

Preceding station	Disused railways	Following station
North Hayling	Southern Region; Hayling Island branch	Terminus
