= Langston railway station =

Former railway station in England

Coordinates: 50.8406°N 0.9837°W

Langston
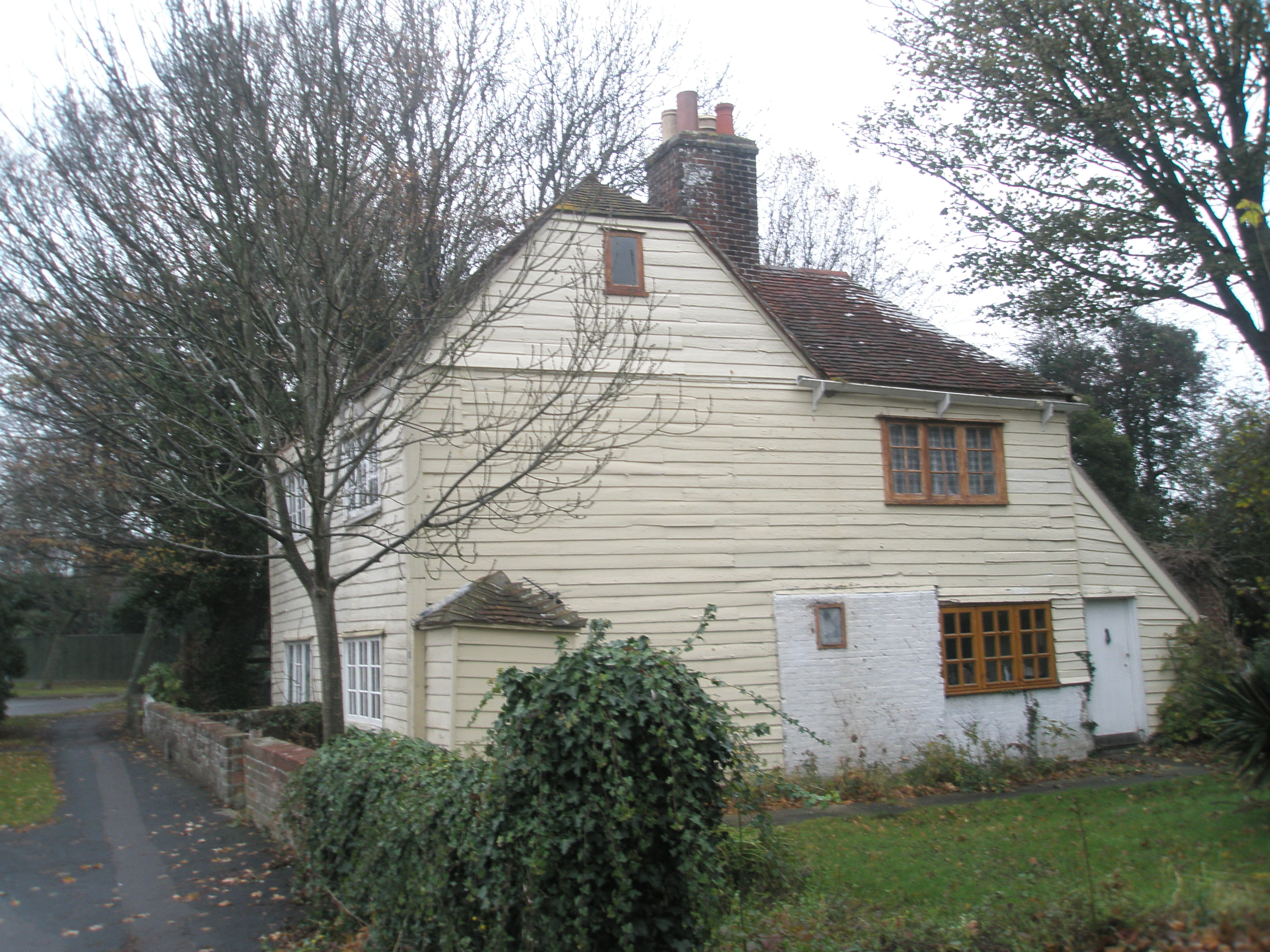
- Stationmaster's House

General information
- Location: Langstone, Havant, Hampshire; England
- Grid reference: SU716049
- Platforms: 1

Other information
- Status: Disused

History
- Pre-grouping: LBSCR
- Post-grouping: Southern Railway; Southern Region of British Railways

Key dates
- 16 July 1867: Opened as "Langstone"
- 1873: Renamed "Langston"
- 4 November 1963: Closed
Location

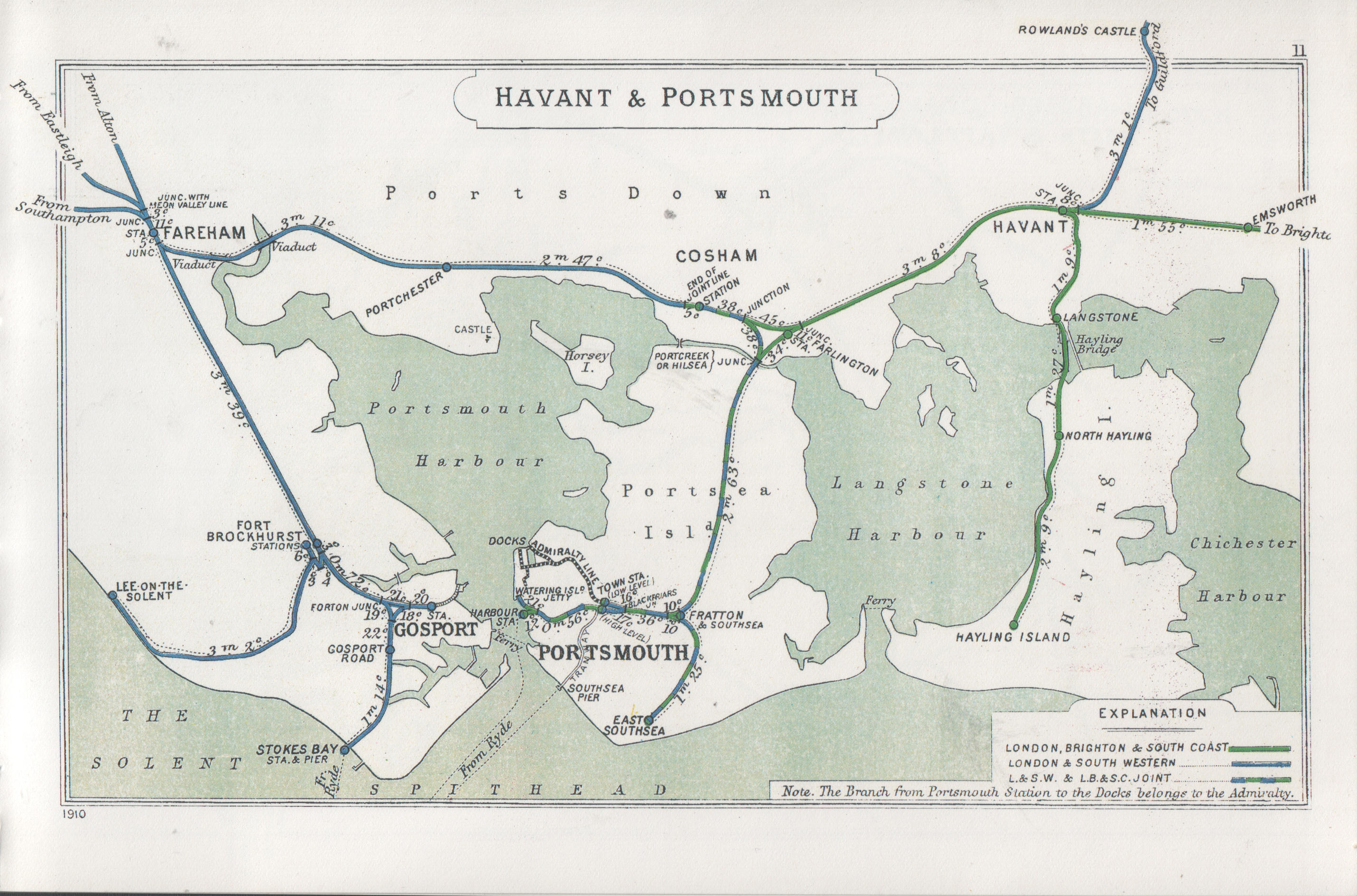
A 1910 Railway Clearing House map of local lines, showing the Hayling Island Branch Line

Langston was a small station on the Hayling Island branch. The station along with the rest of the line closed in 1963, and it served the Langstone area of Havant, a former village which had become contiguous with the larger town to its north. The railway companies always used the old spelling "Langston" for the station, in spite of this form not being used by the local community, and it can be seen in many photographs of the station sign.

The line itself crossed the sole road on and off Hayling Island, which is now the A3023, with a gated level crossing and wooden platform (upgraded to concrete in 1950). This would cause huge traffic jams during peak hours, especially in summer, since the Island had the closest sandy beach to Portsmouth, and trains ran every fifteen minutes at peak times.

The station had no freight facilities (neither did North Hayling, the other intermediate station), however in the Victorian period, there was a slipway for a train ferry to the Isle of Wight immediately south of Langston station. The ferry ran to Bembridge, where there was also a railway station, this being prior to the construction of the pier stations at Portsmouth Harbour and Ryde Pier Head by the LSWR to create a direct rail-ferry link for the Island.

The station structure has since been demolished, but one can still walk the route up to Havant station.

The stationmaster's house was destroyed by fire in December 2018.

Preceding station	Disused railways	Following station
Havant	Southern Region of British Railways; Hayling Island branch line	North Hayling
