= Stoke, Hayling Island =

Village on Hayling Island, Hampshire, England

Coordinates: 50.819859°N 0.981320°W

Stoke
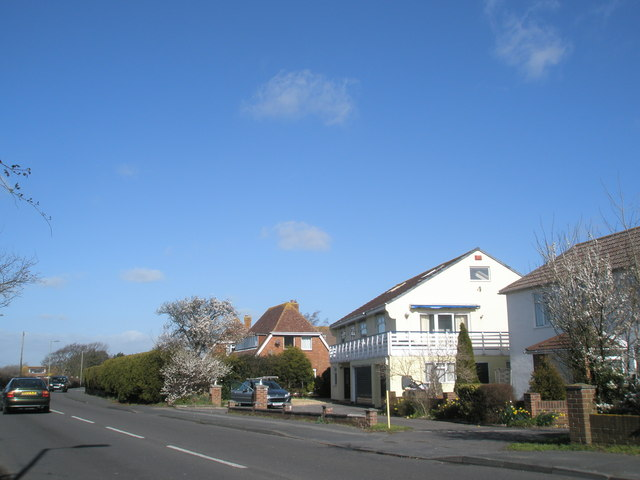
- Havant Road

- Location within Hampshire
- OS grid reference: SU7185402751
- District: Havant
- Shire county: Hampshire
- Region: South East
- Country: England
- Sovereign state: United Kingdom
- Post town: HAYLING ISLAND
- Postcode district: PO11
- Dialling code: 023
- Police: Hampshire and Isle of Wight
- Fire: Hampshire and Isle of Wight
- Ambulance: South Central
- UK Parliament: Havant

Stoke is a village on Hayling Island in the Havant district, in the county of Hampshire, England. The village lies on the Havant A3023 road between North Hayling and South Hayling. The village is closest to Langstone Harbour, opposite the city of Portsmouth.
