= Purbrook =

Village and parish in Hampshire, England

Coordinates: 50.865535°N 1.03669°W

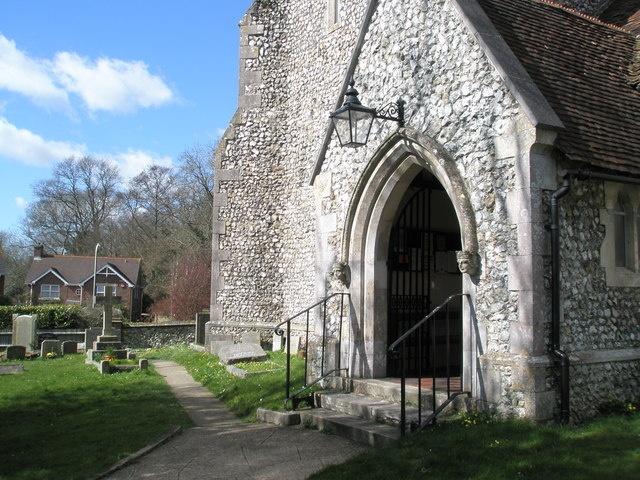
- Entrance to St John the Baptist's Church

- Location within Hampshire
- Population: 9,171 (2011 - ward)
- OS grid reference: SU6788807778
- District: Havant
- Shire county: Hampshire
- Region: South East
- Country: England
- Sovereign state: United Kingdom
- Post town: Waterlooville
- Postcode district: PO7
- Dialling code: 023
- Police: Hampshire and Isle of Wight
- Fire: Hampshire and Isle of Wight
- Ambulance: South Central
- UK Parliament: Havant

Purbrook is a village in the Borough of Havant in Hampshire, England. Purbrook is on the outskirts of Waterlooville just north of Portsmouth. Purbrook village is part of Purbrook Ward which also includes Widley and Crookhorn and had a population of 9,281 (2001), taking up 7.7% of Havant borough's population.

== History ==
Waterlooville and Cowplain did not exist before the year 1815. Before then the area was part of the Forest of Bere, which stretched from the border of Sussex to Winchester. Now the Forest of Bere is a mixture of woodland, open space, heathland, and farmland that includes a small part of the South Downs National Park.

On the southern fringe of the forest was the little village of Purbrook. Its name is a corruption of Pucanbroc, which means the brook of the water-sprite.

Early in the 19th century a windmill was built in Purbrook. Purbrook Church (St Johns) was built in 1858. In 1869 Purbrook Industrial School opened in Stakes Road.

Purbrook Park House was built in 1770. It was rebuilt in 1837. In the 1920s the house became a grammar school and later a comprehensive school. It is now known as Purbrook Park School. The school is a Language College.

== Community ==
There are several schools in Purbrook:

- Purbrook Park School
- Purbrook Junior School
- Purbrook Infant School
- Morelands Primary School

There is also a recreation ground known as Purbrook Heath. There is a children's park, bowls area, tennis courts, several cricket pitches, a football cage and a basketball court all located in 'The Heath'. There is also The Rowans Hospice located opposite the tennis courts. There is a long road that runs right through it, which is called Purbrook Heath Road. It runs straight through and then bisects off to Southwick and Portsdown Hill.

Fort Purbrook is another attraction just located off Portsdown Hill. It is home to an activity centre, and is occasionally open for craft fairs. Some of the activities are archery, indoor rock climbing and rifle shooting.

There is also 1 newsagent, a Onestop, 1 fish and chip shop and 1 pub, The Woodman.

== Papers ==
The only local newspaper Purbrook has is The News.

== Notable people from Purbrook ==
- Mary Eleanor Bowes
- April Cantelo - soprano, opera and oratorio singer
- Roy Heather - Actor Only Fools and Horses
- Charmian May - actress, The Good Life, Bridget Jones’s Diary
- Mason Mount - Professional Football Player
