= 2026 Havant Borough Council election =

2026 English local government election

- 7 May 2026

12 out of 36 seats to Havant Borough Council 19 seats needed for a majority

	First party	Second party	Third party
Leader	Sharon Collings	Philip Munday	Netty Shepherd
Party	Reform	Labour	Green
Last election	2 seats, 2.8%	10 seats, 18.5%	4 seats, 19.6%
Seats before	5	9	6
Seats won	9	1	2
Seats after	10	7	6
Seat change	▲5	▼2	Steady
Popular vote	16,513	3,446	5,180
Percentage	41.6%	8.7%	13.1%
Swing	▲38.8%	▼9.8%	▼6.5%
	Fourth party	Fifth party	Sixth party
Leader	Ryan Brent	Philippa Gray
Party	Conservative	Liberal Democrats	Independent
Last election	13 seats, 37.8%	7 seats, 20.7%	0 seats, 0.6%
Seats before	8	5	3
Seats won	0	0	0
Seats after	5	5	3
Seat change	▼3	Steady	Steady
Popular vote	10,273	4,244	Did not stand
Percentage	25.9%	10.7%	Did not stand
Swing	▼11.9%	▼10.0%	▼0.6%
- Winner of each seat at the 2026 Havant Borough Council election.
Leader before election
Philip Munday
Labour
No overall control (Note: Labour/Green/Liberal Democrats coalition.)
Leader after election
Gillian Harris
Labour
No overall control (Note: Labour/Green/Liberal Democrats coalition.)

The 2026 Havant Borough Council election was held on 7 May 2026, alongside the other local elections across the United Kingdom being held on the same day, to elect 12 of 36 members of Havant Borough Council in Hampshire, England.

Prior to the election, the council was under no overall control, being run by a coalition of Labour, the Liberal Democrats, the Green Party, and an independent councillor, led by Labour councillor Philip Munday. The council remained under no overall control after the election. Reform UK won nine of the twelve seats being contested, and overtook Labour to become the largest party on the council. At the subsequent annual council meeting on 20 May 2026, the Reform group leader, Sharon Collings, was nominated for the role of leader of the council, but was defeated. Instead, Labour councillor Gillian Harris was appointed leader of the council, continuing a Labour, Liberal Democrat and Green coalition.

Due to ongoing local government reorganisation, this will be the final election to Havant Borough Council before it is abolished and replaced by a successor unitary authority. Elections to the successor authority are due to take place in 2027.

== Summary ==
=== Background ===
In 2024, the Conservative Party lost the council to no overall control.

=== Council composition ===
After 2024 election		Before 2026 election	
Party	Seats	Party	Seats
Labour	10	Labour	9
Conservative	13	Conservative	8
Green	4	Green	6
Liberal Democrats	7	Liberal Democrats	5
Reform	2	Reform	5
Independent	0	Independent	3

Changes 2024–2026:

- October 2024: Elizabeth Lloyd (Conservative) leaves party to sit as an independent
- January 2025: Jonathan Hulls (Liberal Democrats) joins Greens
- May 2025: Paul Gray (Liberal Democrats) leaves party to sit as an independent
- July 2025: Elaine Shimbart (Conservative) leaves party to sit as an independent
- November 2025: Mark Coates (Labour) joins Greens
- December 2025: Caren Diamond (Conservative) and Gwen Robinson (Conservative) join Reform
- January 2026: Sarah Milne (Conservative) joins Reform

=== Election result ===
2026 Havant Borough Council election
Party	This election				Full council			This election		
Party	Candidates	Seats	Net	Seats %	Other	Total	Total %	Votes	Votes %	+/−
Reform	{{{candidates}}}	9	▲5	75.0	1	10	27.8	16,513	41.6	+38.8
Labour	{{{candidates}}}	1	▼2	8.3	6	7	19.4	3,446	8.7	–9.8
Green	{{{candidates}}}	2	Steady	16.7	4	6	16.7	5,180	13.1	–6.5
Conservative	{{{candidates}}}	0	▼3	0.0	5	5	13.9	10,273	25.9	–11.9
Liberal Democrats	{{{candidates}}}	0	Steady	0.0	5	5	13.9	4,244	10.7	–10.0
Independent	{{{candidates}}}	0	Steady	0.0	3	3	8.3	N/A (Note: Did not stand candidates.)	N/A	–0.6

== Incumbents ==
Below are a list of the incumbent councillors whose seats are due for election in 2026.

Ward	Incumbent councillor	Party	Re-standing
Bedhampton	Liz Fairhurst	Conservative	No
Cowplain	Andrew Briggs	Conservative	Yes
Emsworth	Charles Robert	Green	Yes
Hart Plain	James Blades	Conservative	No
Havant St Faith's	Daniel Berwick	Labour	Yes
Hayling East	Peter Oliver	Labour	No
Hayling West	Jonathan Hulls (Note: Originally elected as a Liberal Democrat, but later defected to the Green Party.)	Green	Yes
Leigh Park Central & West Leigh	Sharon Collings	Reform	Yes
Leigh Park Hermitage	Vicky Rhodes	Reform	Yes
Purbrook	Caren Diamond (Note: Originally elected as a Conservative, but later defected to Reform.)	Reform	Yes
Stakes	Simon Hagan	Labour	Yes
Waterloo	Gwen Robinson	Reform	Yes

== Ward results ==
=== Bedhampton ===
Bedhampton
Party	Candidate	Votes	%	±%
Reform	Jason Beal	1,490	41.8	+26.5
Liberal Democrats	Isabel Harrison	1,178	33.1	–2.9
Conservative	Mark Inkster	893	25.1	+1.3
Majority		312	8.7	N/A
Turnout		3,561	40.2	+12.2
Registered electors		~8,869		
Reform gain from Conservative		Swing	▲14.7	

=== Cowplain ===
Cowplain
Party	Candidate	Votes	%	±%
Reform	Kev Parsons	1,569	45.6	N/A
Liberal Democrats	Christian Notley	994	28.9	+8.4
Conservative	Andy Briggs*	880	25.6	–8.7
Majority		575	16.7	N/A
Turnout		3,443	45.6	+18.1
Registered electors		~7,550		
Reform gain from Conservative				

=== Emsworth ===
Emsworth
Party	Candidate	Votes	%	±%
Green	Charles Robert*	2,185	49.2	–4.4
Conservative	Andrew Proctor	1,261	28.4	–1.3
Reform	Allan Darby	992	22.4	+16.1
Majority		924	20.8	N/A
Turnout		4,438	53.5	+8.3
Registered electors		~8,289		
Green hold		Swing	▼1.6	

=== Hart Plain ===
Hart Plain
Party	Candidate	Votes	%	±%
Reform	Jason Gillen	1,628	52.3	+38.8
Conservative	Branda Linger	853	27.4	–1.3
Labour	John Colman	629	20.2	–0.6
Majority		775	24.9	N/A
Turnout		3,110	39.9	+15.0
Registered electors		~7,791		
Reform gain from Conservative		Swing	▲20.1	

=== Havant St Faith's ===
Havant St Faith's
Party	Candidate	Votes	%	±%
Labour	Dan Berwick*	1,570	37.1	–8.8
Reform	Lucy Lawrence	1,349	31.9	+19.1
Conservative	Tim Pike	1,315	31.1	+10.0
Majority		221	5.2	N/A
Turnout		4,234	48.1	+11.6
Registered electors		~8,808		
Labour hold		Swing	▼14.0	

=== Hayling East ===
Hayling East
Party	Candidate	Votes	%	±%
Reform	Michael Rennie	1,486	42.9	N/A
Green	Katharine Hulls	1,161	33.5	+3.0
Conservative	Paul Weller	820	23.7	–1.0
Majority		325	9.4	N/A
Turnout		3,467	48.4	+11.2
Registered electors		~7,159		
Reform gain from Labour				

=== Hayling West ===
Hayling West
Party	Candidate	Votes	%	±%
Green	Jonathan Hulls*	1,264	36.6	+24.2
Reform	Lisa Field	1,152	33.4	N/A
Conservative	Julie Richardson	1,038	30.1	+3.7
Majority		112	3.2	N/A
Turnout		3,454	50.1	+8.3
Registered electors		6,898		
Green hold				

=== Leigh Park Central & West Leigh ===
Leigh Park Central & West Leigh
Party	Candidate	Votes	%	±%
Reform	Sharon Collings*	1,418	57.9	+39.7
Labour	Peter Oliver	591	24.1	–3.7
Conservative	Barrie Mann	440	18.0	+0.2
Majority		827	33.8	N/A
Turnout		2,449	29.1	+10.4
Registered electors		~8,424		
Reform hold		Swing	▲21.7	

=== Leigh Park Hermitage ===
Leigh Park Hermitage
Party	Candidate	Votes	%	±%
Reform	Vicky Rhodes*	1,283	57.8	+35.6
Green	Dan Goulding	570	25.7	+11.0
Conservative	Lulu Bowerman	366	16.5	–4.4
Majority		713	32.1	N/A
Turnout		2,219	26.0	+10.8
Registered electors		~8,528		
Reform hold		Swing	▲12.3	

=== Purbrook ===
Purbrook
Party	Candidate	Votes	%	±%
Reform	Caren Diamond*	1,393	43.5	N/A
Liberal Democrats	George Kneller	1,157	36.1	–7.9
Conservative	Husky Patel	652	20.4	–15.6
Majority		236	7.4	N/A
Turnout		3,202	43.8	+15.9
Registered electors		~7,312		
Reform hold				

=== Stakes ===
Stakes
Party	Candidate	Votes	%	±%
Reform	Terry Norton	1,267	45.8	N/A
Conservative	Diana Patrick	843	30.5	–3.5
Labour	Simon Hagan*	656	23.7	–4.9
Majority		424	15.3	N/A
Turnout		2,766	37.4	+15.8
Registered electors		~7,400		
Reform gain from Labour				

=== Waterloo ===
Waterloo
Party	Candidate	Votes	%	±%
Reform	Gwen Robinson*	1,486	44.9	N/A
Liberal Democrats	Jane Briggs	915	27.6	+6.8
Conservative	Edward Rees	912	27.5	–12.8
Majority		571	17.3	N/A
Turnout		3,313	44.6	+16.3
Registered electors		~7,435		
Reform hold				

== Post-election changes ==
=== Emsworth by-election ===
Emsworth by-election: 19 November 2026
Party	Candidate	Votes	%	±%
Green	Katharine Hulls	943	36.8	−12.4
Conservative	Andrew Proctor	828	32.3	+3.9
Reform	Lucy Lawrence	533	20.8	−1.6
Labour	Simon Hagan	144	5.6	N/A
Liberal Democrats	Iain Sutherland	118	4.6	N/A
Majority		116	4.5	−16.3
Turnout		2563	30.9	−22.6
Green hold		Swing		
