= Southwick and Widley =

Civil parish in Hampshire, England

Coordinates: 50°52′14″N 1°04′15″W

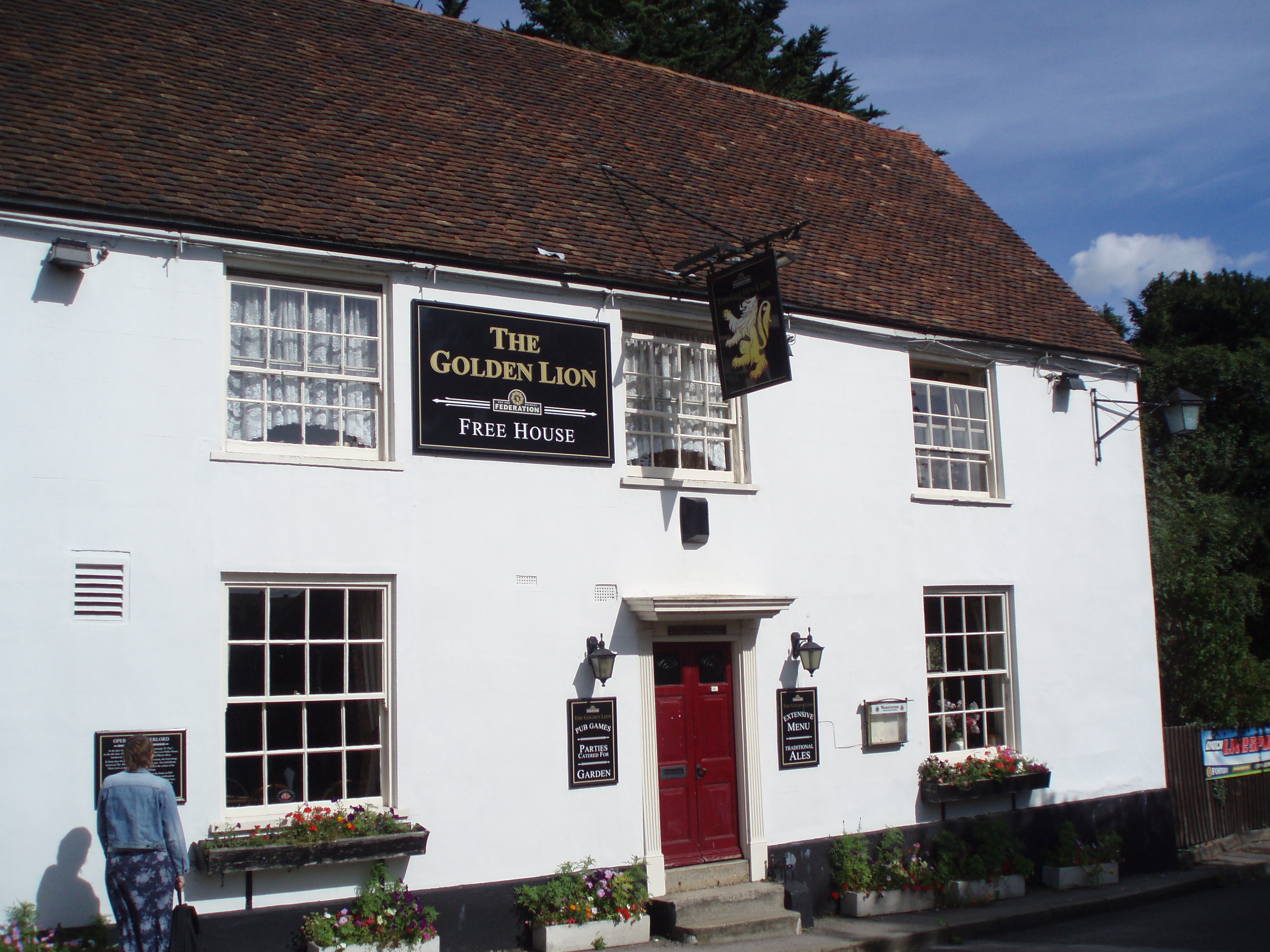
- The Golden Lion, Southwick

- Location within Hampshire
- Population: 889 (2011 Census)
- District: Winchester
- Shire county: Hampshire
- Region: South East
- Country: England
- Sovereign state: United Kingdom
- Post town: PORTSMOUTH
- Postcode district: PO17
- Dialling code: 023
- Police: Hampshire and Isle of Wight
- Fire: Hampshire and Isle of Wight
- Ambulance: South Central
- UK Parliament: Fareham and Waterlooville

Southwick and Widley is a civil parish in the English county of Hampshire forming part of the area administered as the City of Winchester. It comprises the village of Southwick and parts of the Havant suburb of Widley. In 2011 it had a population of 889.

== History ==
The parish was formed on 1 April 1932 from the parishes of Farlington, Southwick, Waterloo and Widley.
