= Widley =

Neighbourhood of Greater Portsmouth, Hampshire, England

Coordinates: 50.85683°N 1.04806°W

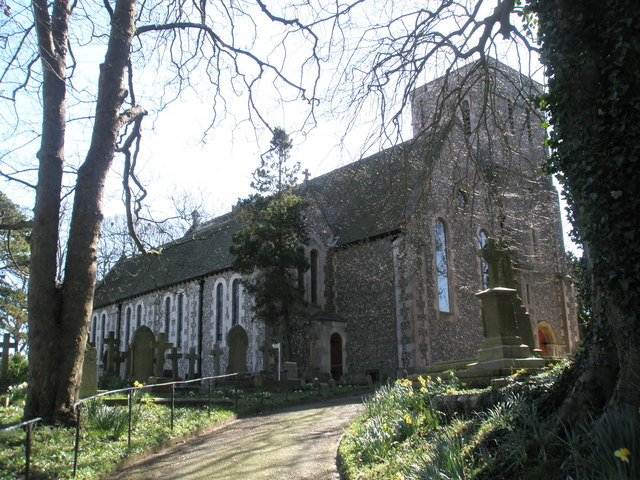

- Location within Hampshire
- OS grid reference: SU671068
- District: Havant
- Shire county: Hampshire
- Region: South East
- Country: England
- Sovereign state: United Kingdom
- Post town: PORTSMOUTH
- Postcode district: PO7
- Dialling code: 023

Widley is an area of the Greater Portsmouth conurbation in Hampshire, near Waterlooville and Purbrook. It is on the dip slope of the South Downs just north of the ridge called Portsdown Hill.

Widley is served by the A3(T), trunk road which runs from Portsmouth to London. The main A3 to London (at this point the A3(M) motorway) is very close by, making it commutable by road. Widley is served by Cosham or Havant rail stations.

== History ==
The Norman manor of Widley was held by the De Port and St John families of Cosham, and later passed to the Earls of Albemarle. In 1293, Isabel countess of Albemarle died without heirs and the manor passed back to the St John family. Later it was in the ownership of the Clynton and Uvedale families although the latter lost the manor temporarily in 1605, when accused of recusancy. It stayed in their family until 1766, when it was sold, and then passed by sale rather than inheritance.

The original village of Widley stood approx 1 mile to the west of the current centre, around the site of the present Widley Farm. The settlement moved to be sited on the then newly built Cosham to Horndean turnpike road at the time of the building of the Portsdown forts and Christ Church, which was built as a place of worship for soldiers based in the forts.

The new church of St Mary Magdalen was built in 1849. Remains of the village's former chapel can be found close to Widley Farm; members of Charles Dickens' family, including his younger brother Alfred, are buried in the graveyard.

== Governance ==
Politically, the majority of Widley is part of Purbrook Ward of Havant Borough Council. However, a small strip to the south is part of the City of Portsmouth unitary authority and the most western parts (including Widley Farm) are in the Southwick and Widley civil parish of Winchester City Council.

In 1894 the civil parish was abolished to form Cosham. On 13 October 1921 Cosham parish was renamed "Widley", on 1 April 1932 the parish was abolished and merged with Havant, part also went to form "Southwick and Widley". In 1931 the parish had a population of 961. It is now in the unparished area of Havant and Waterloo.

Fresh water supply in Widley is supplied by Portsmouth Water. Waste water is serviced by Southern Water. The nearest post office is within the Crookhorn Precinct Co-op shop at 8 Purbrook Way, Crookhorn Ln. Others include Purbrook, situated within the Co-op shop at 31 London Road, Purbrook or Cosham Post Office at 13 High Street, Cosham. The nearest fire stations are Cosham (full-time station) and Waterlooville (part-time station).
