= 2023 Havant Borough Council election =

2023 English local election

- 4 May 2023

10 out of 38 seats to Havant Borough Council 20 seats needed for a majority

	First party	Second party	Third party
Leader	Alex Rennie	Philip Munday
Party	Conservative	Labour	Liberal Democrats
Last election	36 seats, 48.1%	2 seats, 21.3%	0 seats, 19.1%
Seats before	33	2	1
Seats won	5	2	2
Seats after	30	4	2
Seat change	▼5	▲2	▲2
Popular vote	9,655	5,996	5,035
Percentage	39.4%	24.5%	20.6%
Swing	▼8.7%	▲3.2%	▲1.5%
	Fourth party	Fifth party
Party	Green	Independent
Last election	0 seats, 11.2%	1 seat, 0.0%
Seats before	0	1
Seats won	1	0
Seats after	1	1
Seat change	▲1	Steady
Popular vote	3,497	67
Percentage	14.3%	0.3%
Swing	▲3.1%	N/A
- Winner of each seat at the 2023 Havant Borough Council election
Leader before election
Alex Rennie
Conservative
Leader after election
Alex Rennie
Conservative

The 2023 Havant Borough Council election took place on 4 May 2023 to elect members of Havant Borough Council in Hampshire, England. This was on the same day as other local elections across England.

== Summary ==
The council was under Conservative majority control prior to the election, being led by Alex Rennie. The Conservatives lost seats at the election, but retained their majority.

=== Election result ===
2023 Havant Borough Council election
Party	This election				Full council			This election		
Party	Candidates	Seats	Net	Seats %	Other	Total	Total %	Votes	Votes %	+/−
Conservative	{{{candidates}}}	5	▼5	50.0	25	30	78.9	9,655	39.4	–8.7
Labour	{{{candidates}}}	2	▲2	20.0	2	4	10.5	5,996	24.5	+3.2
Liberal Democrats	{{{candidates}}}	2	▲2	20.0	0	2	5.3	5,035	20.6	+1.5
Green	{{{candidates}}}	1	▲1	10.0	0	1	2.6	3,497	14.3	+3.1
Independent	{{{candidates}}}	0	Steady	0.0	1	1	2.6	67	0.3	N/A
ADF	{{{candidates}}}	0	Steady	0.0	0	0	0.0	129	0.5	N/A
Reform	{{{candidates}}}	0	Steady	0.0	0	0	0.0	122	0.5	N/A

== Ward results ==
The Statement of Persons Nominated, which details the candidates standing in each ward, was released by Havant Borough Council following the close of nominations on 4 April 2023. The results for each ward were as follows:

=== Bedhampton ===
Bedhampton
Party	Candidate	Votes	%	±%
Liberal Democrats	Philippa Gray	782	38.5	+8.0
Conservative	Mark Inkster*	762	37.5	–13.9
Labour	Phil Pearson	282	13.9	–4.2
Green	Shelley Saunders	204	10.0	N/A
Majority		20	1.0	N/A
Turnout		2,030	27.5	–1.4
Registered electors		7,382		
Liberal Democrats gain from Conservative		Swing	▲11.0	

=== Cowplain ===
Cowplain
Party	Candidate	Votes	%	±%
Conservative	Andrew Briggs	1,109	53.7	–4.9
Labour	Jamie Biltcliffe	425	20.6	+4.2
Liberal Democrats	Isabel Harrison	334	16.2	+0.6
Green	Bruce Holman	198	9.6	+0.2
Majority		684	33.1	
Turnout		2,066	28.6	–1.3
Registered electors		7,224		
Conservative hold		Swing	▼4.6	

=== Emsworth ===
Emsworth
Party	Candidate	Votes	%	±%
Green	Grainne Rason	1,721	45.7	+22.3
Conservative	Lucy Lawrence	1,092	29.0	–21.0
Labour	Steve Bilbe	453	12.0	N/A
Liberal Democrats	Michael Bolt	373	9.9	–16.7
ADF	Juliet Johnson	129	3.4	N/A
Majority		629	16.7	N/A
Turnout		3,768	45.5	+5.6
Registered electors		8,281		
Green gain from Conservative		Swing	▲21.7	

=== Hart Plain ===
Hart Plain
Party	Candidate	Votes	%	±%
Conservative	James Blades	990	51.1	–2.7
Labour	Susan Arnold	552	28.5	+5.6
Liberal Democrats	Gregory Pearson	224	11.6	–1.4
Green	Peter May	171	8.8	–1.6
Majority		438	22.6	
Turnout		1,937	25.1	–1.2
Registered electors		7,717		
Conservative hold		Swing	▼4.2	

=== Hayling East ===
Hayling East
Party	Candidate	Votes	%	±%
Labour	Mark Coates	1,728	64.5	+32.1
Conservative	Gill Wrixon	953	35.5	–7.9
Majority		755	29.0	N/A
Turnout		2,681	36.9	+2.1
Registered electors		7,266		
Labour gain from Conservative		Swing	▲20.0	

=== Hayling West ===
Hayling West
Party	Candidate	Votes	%	±%
Liberal Democrats	Paul Gray	1,718	60.0	+24.2
Conservative	Andrew Free	903	31.5	–16.0
Green	Natasha Parker	242	8.5	+4.3
Majority		815	28.5	N/A
Turnout		2,863	41.9	+3.9
Registered electors		6,834		
Liberal Democrats gain from Conservative		Swing	▲20.1	

=== Purbrook ===
Purbrook
Party	Candidate	Votes	%	±%
Conservative	Ryan Brent	883	43.8	–8.0
Liberal Democrats	Adrian Tansom	570	28.2	+10.3
Labour	Simon Hagan	404	20.0	+0.1
Green	Rosie Blackburn	161	8.0	–2.4
Majority		313	15.6	
Turnout		2,018	27.6	–1.1
Registered electors		7,312		
Conservative hold		Swing	▼9.2	

=== St Faiths ===
St Faiths
Party	Candidate	Votes	%	±%
Labour	Gillian Harris	1,631	51.3	–4.6
Conservative	Tim Pike*	931	29.3	–1.0
Green	Reuben Mychaleckyj	306	9.6	+2.3
Reform	Dave Etherington	122	3.8	N/A
Liberal Democrats	Maria Mleczko-Miller	120	3.8	–2.7
Independent	Adam Bowman	67	2.1	N/A
Majority		700	22.0	–3.6
Turnout		3,177	38.8	–0.1
Registered electors		8,188		
Labour gain from Conservative		Swing	▼1.8	

=== Stakes ===
Stakes
Party	Candidate	Votes	%	±%
Conservative	Diana Patrick*	780	46.6	–5.7
Labour	David Hill	521	31.1	+5.7
Liberal Democrats	Antonia Harrison	224	13.4	–0.3
Green	Carla Watt	149	8.9	+0.3
Majority		259	15.5	–11.4
Turnout		1,674	22.3	–0.1
Registered electors		7,507		
Conservative hold		Swing	▼5.7	

=== Waterloo ===
Waterloo
Party	Candidate	Votes	%	±%
Conservative	Gwen Robinson*	1,252	54.7	–6.2
Liberal Democrats	Lisa Jackson	690	30.2	+5.5
Green	Neil Attewell	345	15.1	+0.7
Majority		562	24.5	–11.7
Turnout		2,287	28.8	–0.7
Registered electors		7,941		
Conservative hold		Swing	▼5.9	
