= 2024 Havant Borough Council election =

Local election in Havant, England

- 2 May 2024

All 36 seats to Havant Borough Council 19 seats needed for a majority
- Turnout: 29.79%

	First party	Second party	Third party
Leader	Alex Rennie	Philip Munday	Philippa Gray
Party	Conservative	Labour	Liberal Democrats
Last election	30 seats, 39.4%	4 seats, 24.5%	2 seats, 20.6%
Seats before	28	4	2
Seats won	13	10	7
Seat change	▼15	▲6	▲5
Popular vote	26,370	12,923	14,455
Percentage	37.8%	18.51%	20.7%
	Fourth party	Fifth party
Party	Green	Reform
Last election	1 seat, 14.3%	No seats, 0.5%
Seats before	1	0
Seats won	4	2
Seat change	▲4	▲2
Popular vote	13,646	1,978
Percentage	19.6%	2.8%
- Winner of each seat at the 2024 Havant Borough Council election
Council control before election
Alex Rennie
Conservative
Council control after election
Philip Munday
Labour
No overall control

The 2024 Havant Borough Council election took place on Thursday 2 May 2024, alongside the other local elections in the United Kingdom being held on the same day. All 36 members of Havant Borough Council in Hampshire were elected following boundary changes.

Prior to the election the Conservatives held a majority of the seats on the council. Following the election the council was left under no overall control, and the Conservative leader of the council, Alex Rennie, lost his seat. The Conservatives remained the largest party, but a coalition of Labour, the Liberal Democrats and Green Party formed to run the council, led by Labour councillor Philip Munday. He was appointed as leader of the council at the subsequent annual council meeting on 15 May 2024.

== Background ==
Since its creation in 1974, Havant has been a consistently strong council for the Conservatives. They have held majorities on the council since 1980, aside from periods of no overall control between 1990 and 2002, where the Liberal Democrats became the largest group on the council for 4 years.

In the previous election in 2023, the Conservatives lost 5 seats with 39.4% of the vote, Labour gained 1 with 24.5%, the Liberal Democrats gained 2 with 20.6%, and the Green Party won their first seat with 14.3%.

== Boundary changes ==
Havant usually elects its councillors in thirds, on a 4-year cycle. However, following boundary changes, all councillors were elected to the new wards. The change fixes the number of councillors for every ward at 3, which reduces the total number of councillors by 2. Each voter could cast up to three votes. The councillors elected to each ward will serve two, three or four year terms, based on their relative vote share, with the longest term being served by the councillor with the largest number of votes.

Old wards	No. of seats	New wards	No. of seats
Barncroft	2	Bedhampton	3
Battins	2	Cowplain	3
Bedhampton	3	Emsworth	3
Bondfields	2	Hart Plain	3
Cowplain	3	Havant St Faith's	3
Emsworth	3	Hayling East	3
Hart Plain	3	Hayling West	3
Hayling East	3	Leigh Park Central and West Leigh	3
Hayling West	3	Leigh Park Hermitage	3
Purbrook	3	Purbrook	3
St Faith's	3	Stakes	3
Stakes	3	Waterloo	3
Warren Park	2		
Waterloo	3		

== Summary ==
=== Council composition ===
After 2023 election		Before 2024 election		After 2024 election	
Party	Seats	Party	Seats	Party	Seats
Conservative	30	Conservative	28	Conservative	13
Labour	4	Labour	4	Labour	10
Liberal Democrats	2	Liberal Democrats	2	Liberal Democrats	7
Green	1	Green	1	Green	4
Independent	1	Independent	0	Independent	0
Vacant	0	Vacant	3	Reform	2

Changes:

- January 2024: Carly Scannell (Conservative) resigns; seat left vacant until 2024 election
- February 2024: Tom Moutray (independent) resigns; seat left vacant until 2024 election
- March 2024: David Guest (Conservative) resigns; seat left vacant until 2024 election

=== Election result ===
Havant Borough Council's composition following the 2024 elections.

2024 Havant Borough Council election
Party	Candidates	Seats	Gains	Losses	Net gain/loss	Seats %	Votes %	Votes	+/−
Conservative	36	13	0	10	▼17	36.1	37.8	26,370	−1.6
Labour	15	10	2	0	▲6	27.8	18.5	12,923	+3.3
Liberal Democrats	19	7	5	0	▲5	19.4	20.7	14,455	+0.1
Green	19	4	3	0	▲3	11.1	19.6	13,646	+5.3
Reform	6	2	0	0	▲2	5.6	2.8	1,978	N/A
Independent	2	0	0	0	▼1	0.0	0.6	441	−2.0

== Ward results ==
The Statement of Persons Nominated, which details the candidates standing in each ward, was released by Havant Borough Council following the close of nominations on 5 April 2024.

=== Bedhampton ===
Bedhampton (3 seats)
Party	Candidate	Votes	%	±%
Liberal Democrats	Philippa Gray*	1,159	47.4	
Liberal Democrats	Michael Lind	887	36.3	
Conservative	Liz Fairhurst*	767	31.4	
Liberal Democrats	Annie Martin	739	30.2	
Conservative	Mark Inkster	650	26.6	
Conservative	Trevor Hughes	576	23.6	
Reform	Mark Collins	493	20.2	
Labour	Philip Pearson	450	18.4	
Green	Jim Graham	348	14.2	
Green	Richard Lanchester	288	11.8	
Turnout		2,448	28.02	
Liberal Democrats hold				
Liberal Democrats gain from Conservative				
Conservative hold				

=== Cowplain ===
Cowplain (3 seats)
Party	Candidate	Votes	%	±%
Conservative	David Keast*	1,021	49.0	
Conservative	Neil Bowdell*	870	41.8	
Conservative	Andrew Briggs*	852	40.9	
Labour	Will McGannan	696	33.4	
Green	Bruce Holman	650	31.2	
Liberal Democrats	Christian Notley	609	29.3	
Turnout		2,106	27.45	
Conservative hold				
Conservative hold				
Conservative hold				

=== Emsworth ===
Emsworth (3 seats)
Party	Candidate	Votes	%	±%
Green	Grainne Rason*	2,457	64.7	
Green	Reuben Mychaleckyj	1,976	52.1	
Green	Charles Robert	1,660	43.7	
Conservative	Richard Kennett*	1,364	35.9	
Conservative	Carole Bowerman*	1,177	31.0	
Conservative	Lucy Lawrence	954	25.1	
Liberal Democrats	Michael Bolt	477	12.6	
Reform	John Davis	287	7.6	
Liberal Democrats	Adam Bowman	285	7.5	
Turnout		3,808	45.18	
Green hold				
Green gain from Conservative				
Green gain from Conservative				

=== Hart Plain ===
Hart Plain (3 seats)
Party	Candidate	Votes	%	±%
Conservative	Ann Briggs	777	40.3	
Conservative	Elaine Shimbart*	768	39.8	
Conservative	James Blades*	654	33.9	
Liberal Democrats	Jules Ashley	570	29.5	
Labour	John Colman	563	29.2	
Green	Peter May	432	22.4	
Reform	Jonathan Harvey	365	18.9	
Turnout		1,942	24.92	
Conservative hold				
Conservative hold				
Conservative hold				

=== Havant St. Faith's ===
Havant St. Faith's (3 seats)
Party	Candidate	Votes	%	±%
Labour	Phil Munday*	1,845	57.7	
Labour	Gillian Harris*	1,728	54.1	
Labour	Daniel Berwick	1,568	49.1	
Conservative	John Dyer	846	26.5	
Conservative	Nigel Chilcott	785	24.6	
Conservative	Maurice Knowles	630	19.7	
Green	Nick Saunders	582	18.2	
Reform	Dave Etherington	515	16.1	
Independent	Giles Harris	231	7.2	
Turnout		3,212	36.48	
Labour win (new seat)				
Labour win (new seat)				
Labour win (new seat)				

=== Hayling East ===
Hayling East (3 seats)
Party	Candidate	Votes	%	±%
Labour	Mark Coates*	1,459	54.6	
Green	Netty Shepherd	992	37.1	
Labour	Peter Oliver	839	31.4	
Conservative	Geoffrey Hartridge	806	30.2	
Green	Natasha Parker	751	28.1	
Conservative	Eric Cundliffe	732	27.4	
Conservative	Shola Attryde	610	22.8	
Green	Judy Valentine	570	21.3	
Turnout		2,710	37.17	
Labour hold				
Green gain from Conservative				
Labour gain from Conservative				

=== Hayling West ===
Hayling West (3 seats)
Party	Candidate	Votes	%	±%
Liberal Democrats	Paul Gray*	1,818	63.9	
Liberal Democrats	Wilf Forrow	1,678	59.0	
Liberal Democrats	Jonathan Hulls	1,586	55.8	
Conservative	Julie Richardson*	784	27.6	
Conservative	Brenda Linger*	765	26.9	
Conservative	Edward Rees	584	20.5	
Green	Aaron Bradbury	367	12.9	
Green	Rob Soar	275	9.7	
Turnout		2,867	41.80	
Liberal Democrats hold				
Liberal Democrats gain from Conservative				
Liberal Democrats gain from Conservative				

=== Leigh Park Central & West Leigh ===
Leigh Park Central & West Leigh (3 seats)
Party	Candidate	Votes	%	±%
Labour	Jason Horton	655	40.8	
Labour	Munazza Faiz	521	32.5	
Reform	Sharon Collings	430	26.8	
Conservative	Alex Rennie	420	26.2	
Conservative	Richard Stone	415	25.9	
Green	Cayleigh Arnold	363	22.6	
Conservative	Kris Tindall	338	21.1	
Liberal Democrats	Jo Lowe	279	17.4	
Liberal Democrats	Glenda Dunford	238	14.8	
Independent	Malc Carpenter	210	13.1	
Turnout		1,610	18.73	
Labour win (new seat)				
Labour win (new seat)				
Reform win (new seat)				

=== Leigh Park Hermitage ===
Leigh Park Hermitage (3 seats)
Party	Candidate	Votes	%	±%
Labour	Richard Brown	499	37.9	
Labour	Amy Redsull-Aveline*	472	35.9	
Reform	Vicky Rhodes	381	29.0	
Conservative	Jackie Branson	358	27.2	
Conservative	Pam Crellin	346	26.3	
Conservative	Yvonne Weeks	337	25.6	
Green	Rayner Piper	252	19.2	
Liberal Democrats	Maria Mleczko-Miller	227	17.3	
Turnout		1,319	15.17	
Labour win (new seat)				
Labour win (new seat)				
Reform win (new seat)				

=== Purbrook ===
Purbrook (3 seats)
Party	Candidate	Votes	%	±%
Liberal Democrats	Antonia Harrison	979	48.2	
Liberal Democrats	Paul Tansom	933	45.9	
Conservative	Caren Diamond*	802	39.5	
Conservative	Terry Norton	725	35.7	
Conservative	Husky Patel*	705	34.7	
Liberal Democrats	George Kneller	649	32.0	
Green	Susan James	444	21.9	
Turnout		2,058	27.91	
Liberal Democrats gain from Conservative				
Liberal Democrats gain from Conservative				
Conservative hold				

=== Stakes ===
Stakes (3 seats)
Party	Candidate	Votes	%	±%
Conservative	Elizabeth Lloyd*	741	45.7	
Conservative	Sarah Milne*	682	42.1	
Labour	Simon Hagan	624	38.5	
Conservative	Diana Patrick*	599	37.0	
Labour	David Hill	501	30.9	
Green	Paul Briley	420	25.9	
Liberal Democrats	Crispin Ward	396	24.4	
Turnout		1,633	21.57	
Conservative hold				
Conservative hold				
Labour gain from Conservative				

=== Waterloo ===
Waterloo (3 seats)
Party	Candidate	Votes	%	±%
Conservative	Ryan Brent	1,023	48.8	
Conservative	Peter Wade*	977	46.6	
Conservative	Gwen Robinson*	930	44.4	
Liberal Democrats	Jane Briggs	529	25.3	
Labour	Darren Corps	503	24.0	
Green	Owen Plumkett	484	23.1	
Liberal Democrats	John Pratley	417	19.9	
Green	Neil Attewell	335	16.0	
Turnout		2,122	28.30	
Conservative hold				
Conservative hold				
Conservative hold				
