= Southwick, Hampshire =

Village and parish in Hampshire, England

Coordinates: 50.874°N 1.112°W

Southwick
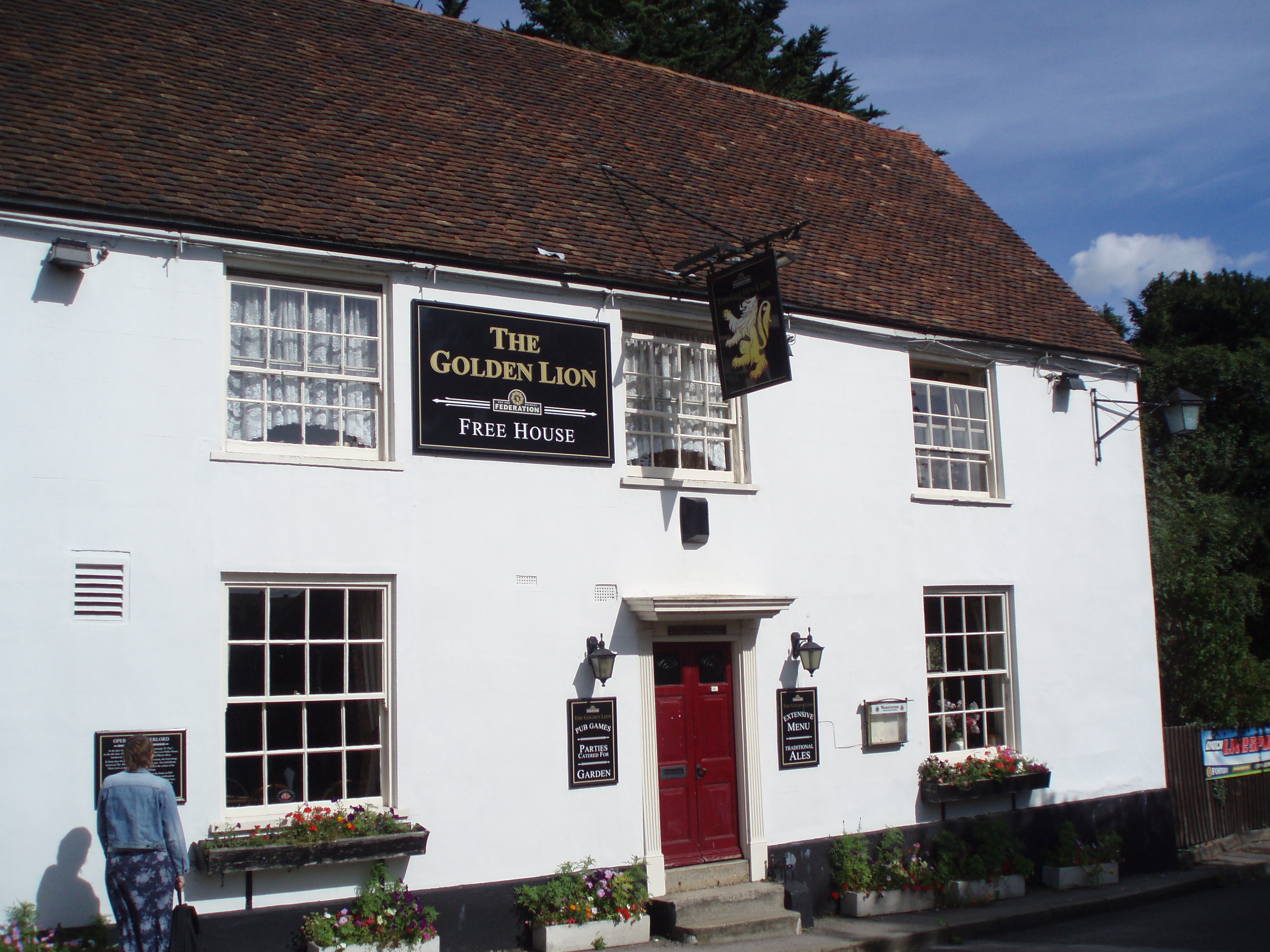
- The Golden Lion Inn

- Location within Hampshire
- Population: 315
- Civil parish: Southwick and Widley
- District: Winchester
- Shire county: Hampshire
- Region: South East
- Country: England
- Sovereign state: United Kingdom
- Post town: PORTSMOUTH
- Postcode district: PO17
- Dialling code: 023
- Police: Hampshire and Isle of Wight
- Fire: Hampshire and Isle of Wight
- Ambulance: South Central
- UK Parliament: Fareham and Waterlooville

Southwick /ˈsʌðɪk/ is a village and former civil parish, now in the parish of Southwick and Widley, in the Winchester district, in Hampshire, England. 1 mile (1.6 km) north of the Portsmouth boundary measured from Portsea Island. Homes and farms in the village are influenced by the style of the Middle Ages apart from Church Lodge.

== History ==
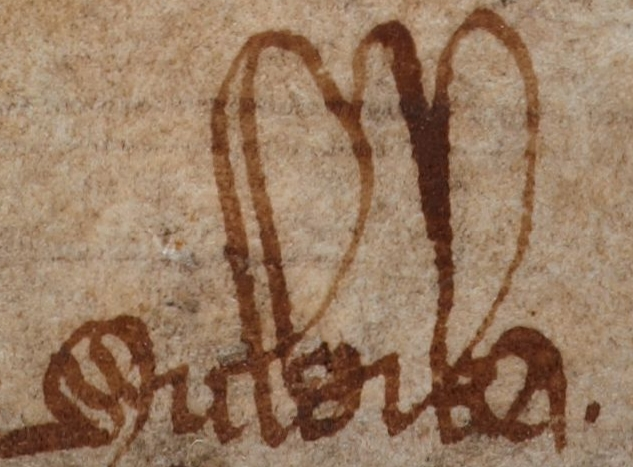
Early mention of Southwick

The name Southwick derives from the Old English sūðwīc meaning 'south trading settlement'.

Southwick was initially the site of Southwick Priory, in the 12th century. On the Dissolution of the Monasteries during the Reformation the estate, including the village, was granted to John White.

Southwick House, a new manor house was completed in 1813. This house was gutted by fire in 1838, and was renovated and rebuilt by 1841. The house and part of the estate was requisitioned during World War II and used as the SHAEF headquarters for Operation Overlord, the cross-channel invasion of Normandy. The nearby Golden Lion public house, according to those there during this period, was frequently used by numerous senior American and British generals. Since then, the house has been used by various branches of the armed forces, including as HMS Dryad and, from 2005, by the Defence School of Policing and Guarding.

Southwick is rare in that the village is still entirely owned by the Southwick Estate (except for Church Lodge). The most obvious sign of this is that all the houses, except manor houses, have dark red-painted front doors – a condition laid down in the tenancy agreements. The only exceptions are the White House, the residence of the vicar and Church Lodge. Church Lodge is the only privately owned house in the old village. The church itself is a Grade I listed early medieval building, known as St James, but officially "St James without (i.e. outside) the priory gate".

In October 2011 the FirstGroup bus services providing travel to the village residents was withdrawn. The only shop within the village, Southwick Village Stores, is opposite the church.

== Civil parish ==
In 1931 the parish had a population of 486. On 1 April 1932 the parish was abolished to form "Southwick and Widley", part also went to Havant.

== Gallery ==
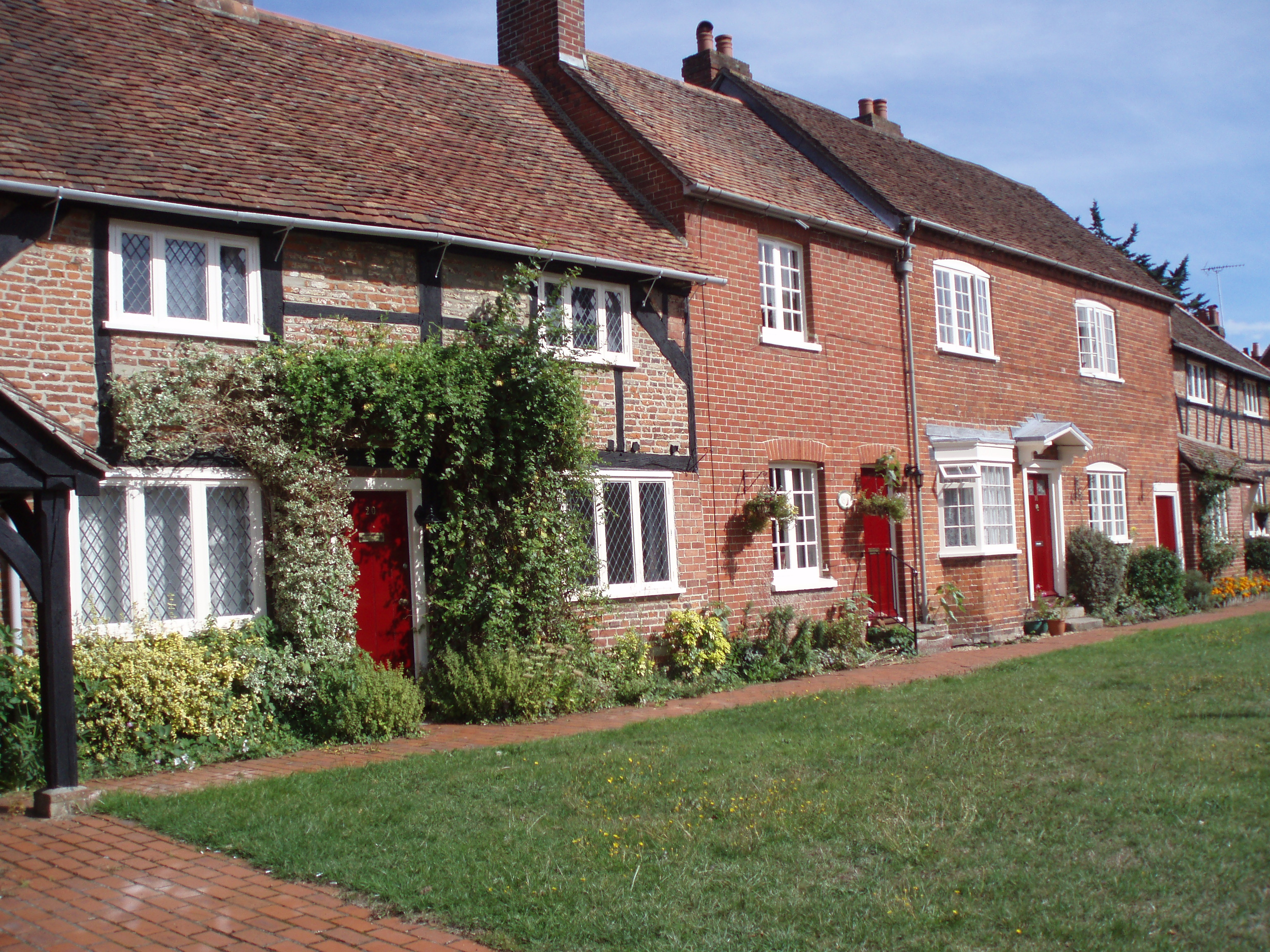

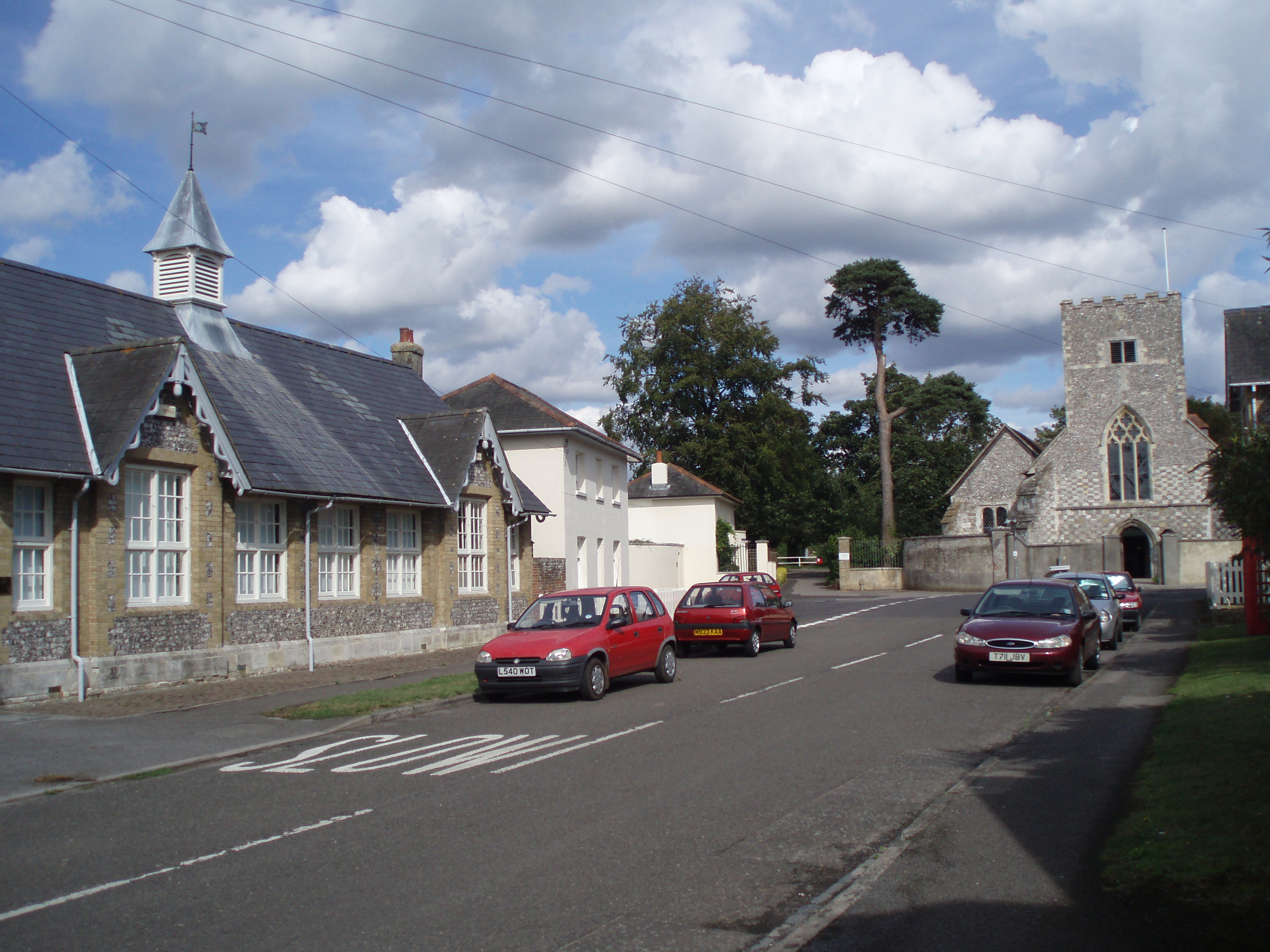

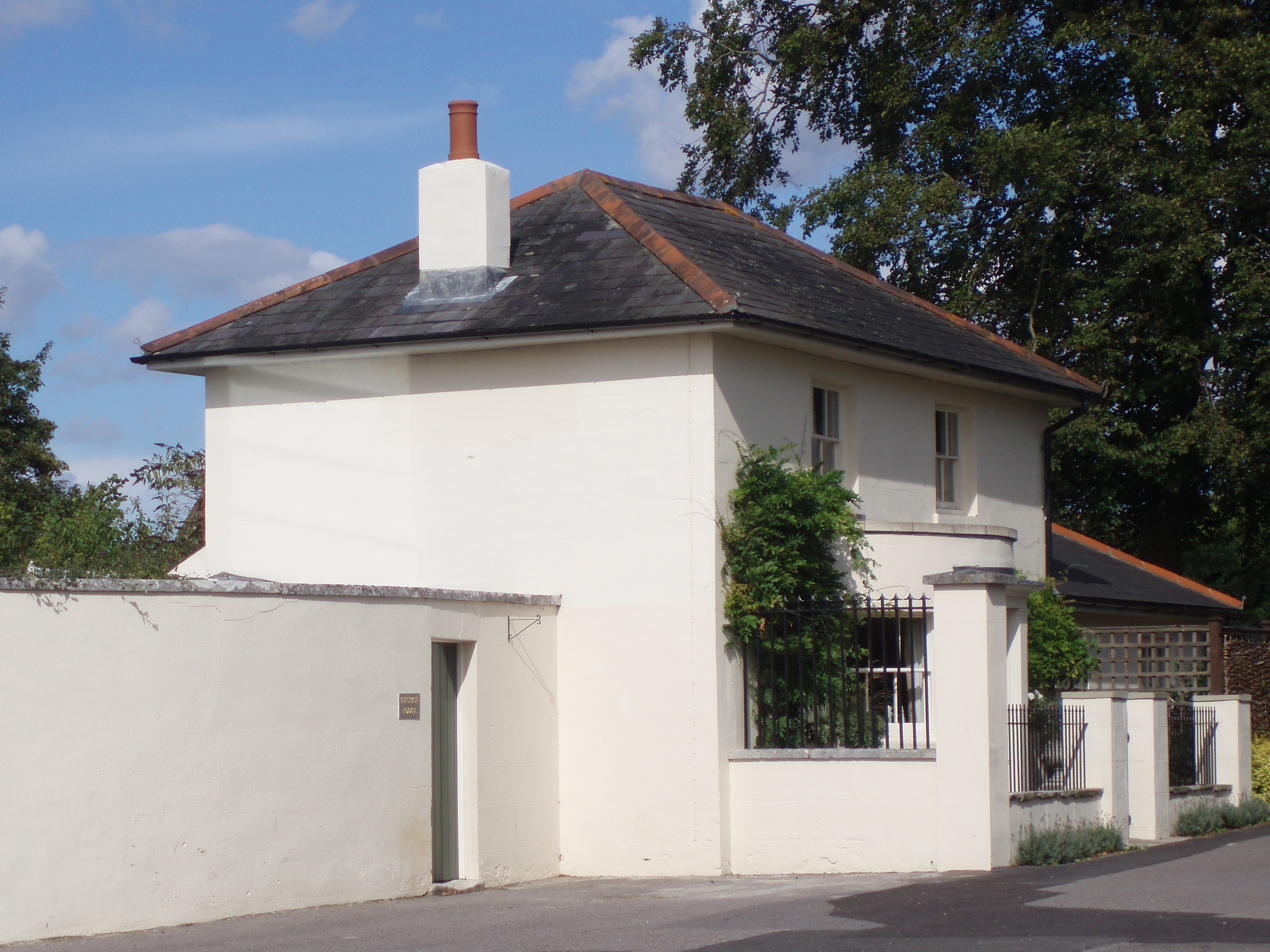
