= Hayling Island branch line =

Disused branch line in Hampshire, England

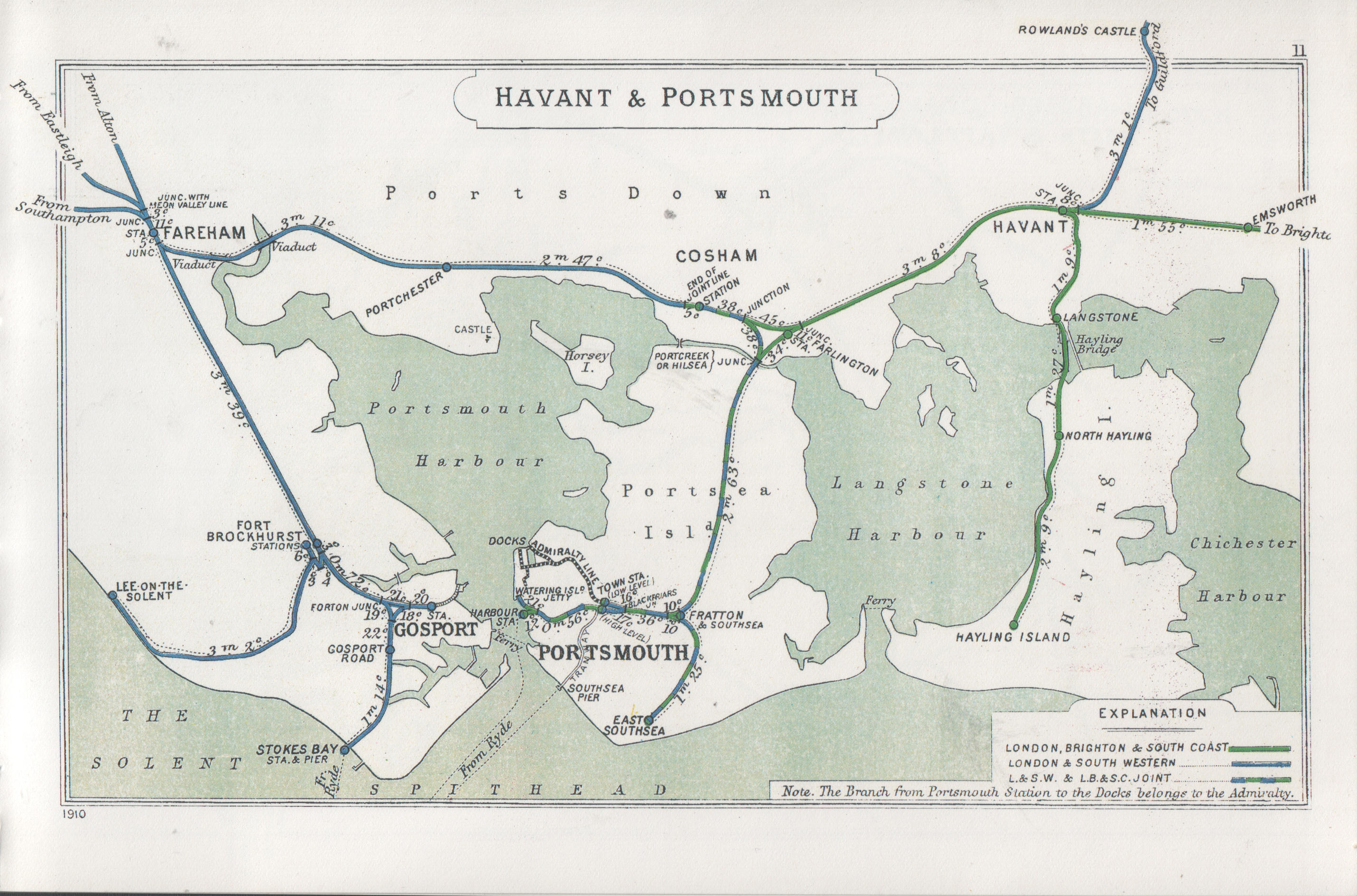
A 1910 Railway Clearing House map of local lines, showing the Hayling Island branch line

The Hayling Island branch was a short railway branch line in Hampshire, England, that connected a station on Hayling Island with the main line network at Havant. It was built by the Hayling Railway; at first the company planned to run it along a new embankment built along tidal mudflats, but this proved impractical. The line was opened along firm ground in 1867.

The line included a bridge and viaduct over tidal water at Langstone; there was a low weight restriction on the viaduct, and only small locomotives were allowed to use it; this resulted in the survival in active service of former LB&SCR A1 class tank engines (known as "Terriers") until closure of the line.

In the early 1960s large numbers of holidaymakers were carried on the line in high season, but heavy expenditure on repairs to the viaduct would have been necessary, and the cost was unsupportable; the line closed in 1963.

== History ==
=== Before the Hayling Railway ===
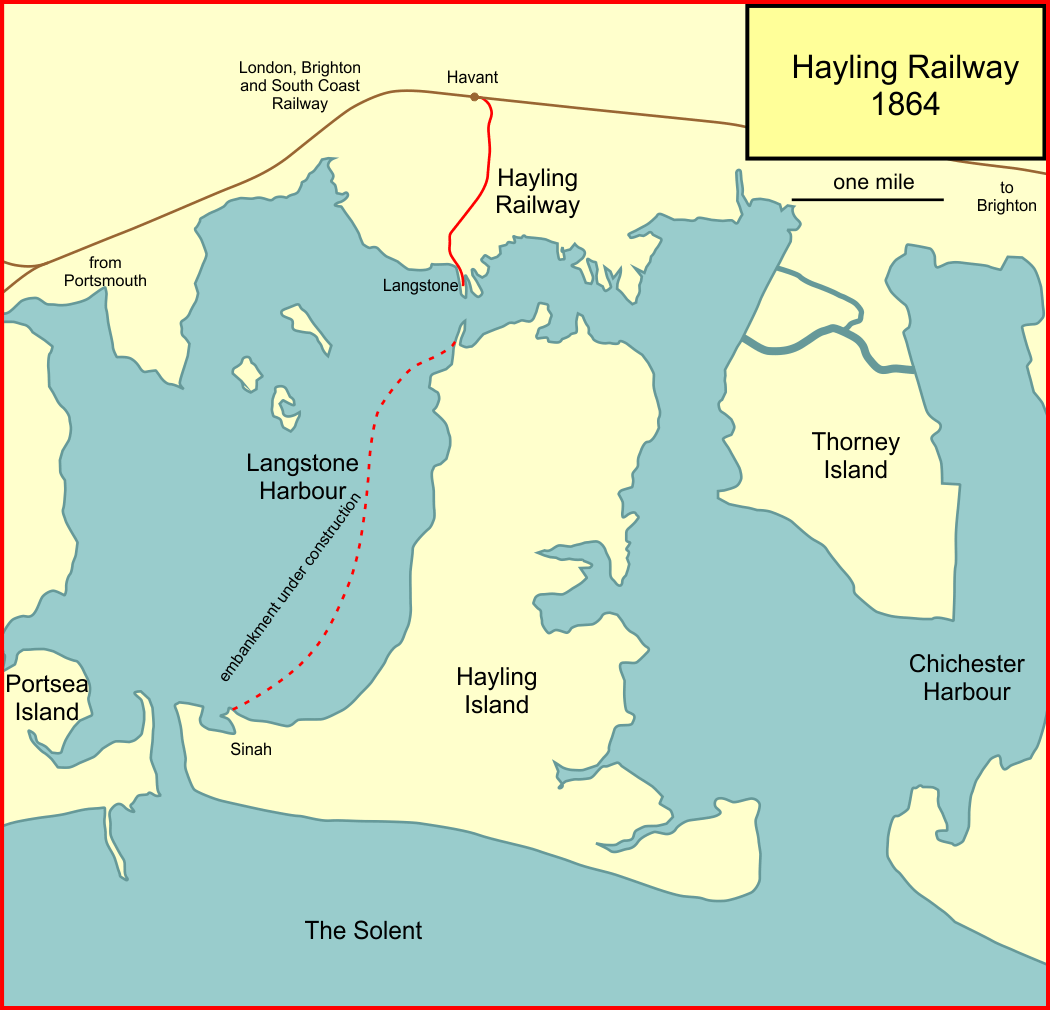
The Hayling Railway in 1864

Hayling Island had long been isolated, situated off the south coast at the eastern side of the island where Portsmouth stands. The soil is good, encouraging agriculture. In 1824 the lord of the manor, Lord Norfolk, had a road bridge constructed at Langstone. Mitchell describes the bridge as frail. For the first time the island had a roadway connection to the mainland; but the poor road system on the island, and the widely dispersed farming settlements meant that transport was still a major difficulty.

In 1847 the London, Brighton and South Coast Railway opened a line from Chichester to Portsmouth, connecting with the route from London via Brighton. There was a station at Havant, but this did little to improve Hayling's commercial position, chiefly because of the poor roads in the general district.

In 1858 the Portsmouth Direct Railway was opened; it became aligned with the London and South Western Railway (LSWR) and was eventually absorbed by the LSWR. Serious friction developed between the LBSCR and the LSWR and it took some time for ordinary railway business to resume. The LSWR considered Portsmouth to be the only significant population centre in the area and gave little thought to the island.

=== Hayling Railway authorised ===
Hayling Railways Act 1860
- Act of Parliament
- Parliament of the United Kingdom
- Long title: An Act for making Railways between the London, Brighton, and South Coast and Direct Portsmouth Railways and Hayling Ferry, and for other Purposes.
- Citation: 23 & 24 Vict. c. clxvi

Dates
- Royal assent: 23 July 1860

Text of statute as originally enacted

It was left to local people to promote a railway into the island, and they did so, getting an act of Parliament authorising the Hayling Railway, the Hayling Railways Act 1860 (23 & 24 Vict. c. clxvi), on 23 July 1860. There would be a substantial timber viaduct at Langstone with an opening section for navigation. The line would continue to Sinah Point, at the extreme western tip of the island; it would cross mudflats passing some distance to the west of the hard ground, and enabling the reclamation of substantial areas of land. In addition, docks were to be constructed at Sinah. Authorised capital was £50,000, but this proved to be very difficult to generate. Nevertheless, a limited start was made, and by August 1864 the first part of the line, as far as Langstone Quay was ready; this was opened to goods trains on 19 January 1865.

Hayling Railway and Docks Act 1864
- Act of Parliament
- Parliament of the United Kingdom
- Long title: An Act for enabling the Hayling Railways Company to make and maintain Railways in Extension of their authorized Railways, and to make and maintain Docks, and to raise Monies for the Purpose, and to make Arrangements with other Companies; and for other Purposes.
- Citation: 27 & 28 Vict. c. clxxvi

Dates
- Royal assent: 14 July 1864

Text of statute as originally enacted

The directors did not lack ambition, for they had obtained a further act of Parliament, the Hayling Railway and Docks Act 1864 (27 & 28 Vict. c. clxxvi) on 14 July 1864 authorising an eastward extension from Sinah Point to South Hayling, intending to build a small port there. However the construction across the mudflats to Sinah Point was turning out to be far more costly than anticipated, and at the same time revenue from the short Langstone to Havant line was disappointing, and construction was soon suspended.

=== A new start ===
Hayling Railways Act 1867
- Act of Parliament
- Parliament of the United Kingdom
- Long title: An Act for enabling the Hayling Railways Company to abandon Portions of their authorized Railway; to make a substituted Line of Railway; and for other Purposes.
- Citation: 30 & 31 Vict. c. clxxxix

Dates
- Royal assent: 12 August 1867

Text of statute as originally enacted

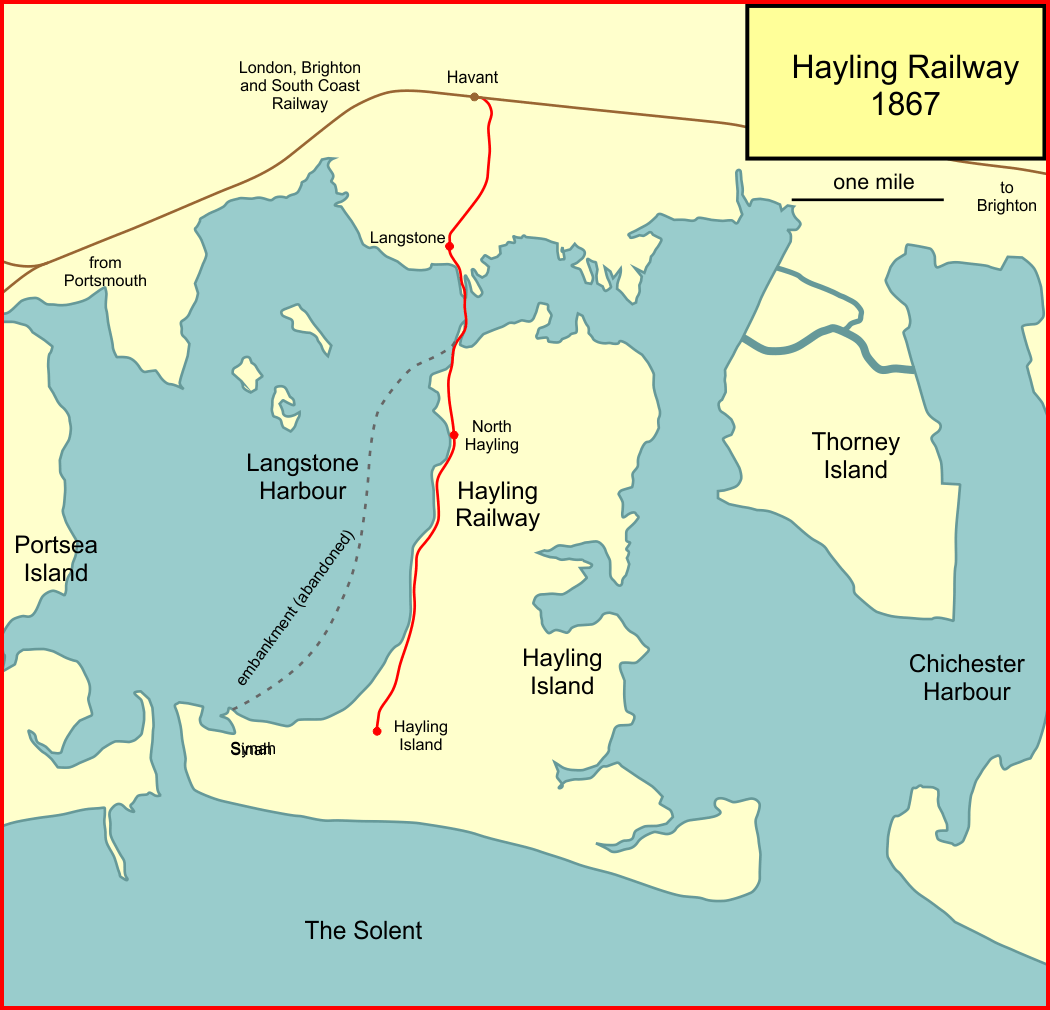
The Hayling Railway in 1867

While the work was at a standstill, Francis Fuller (1807 – 1887) was active in acquiring land on the island. He saw the potential of the island for leisure purposes, including a race track and other amenities. Fuller noted that the railway construction across the mudflats was prohibitively expensive, and he had the line resurveyed, to reroute it across hard ground. He acquired the necessary land himself, and engaged a contractor, Frederick Furness. He got the necessary authorising act of Parliament, the Hayling Railways Act 1867 (30 & 31 Vict. c. clxxxix) for the change on 12 August 1867. Work had been in progress in anticipation of the act and Fuller made a private passenger journey on the line on 28 June 1867. An inspection of the line for the Board of Trade, required for public passenger operation, took place on 4 July 1867, but here were numerous shortcomings and approval was refused. The Board of Trade inspecting officer made a further visit on 15 August 1867, and this time approved passenger opening. As well as technical defects there was an unauthorised level crossing at Langstone. As matters developed, the crossing was condoned and never converted to a bridge as authorised. A full public service was begun on 16 July 1867. This was immediately prior to the first day of a race meeting arranged by Fuller.

The line now terminated at South Hayling (later renamed Hayling Island). The originally intended commercial destination and dock at Sinah Point was no longer in consideration. The sum of £82, 275 had been expended; this can be compared with the original paid up capital of £54,564 with a further £21,300 raised for the South Hayling extension of 1864. This left a debt of £11,321, and the company was forced into the hands of the official receiver in 1869. (Note: Figures from Scott; the arithmetic is difficult to follow.)

== Operational considerations ==
=== Train service ===
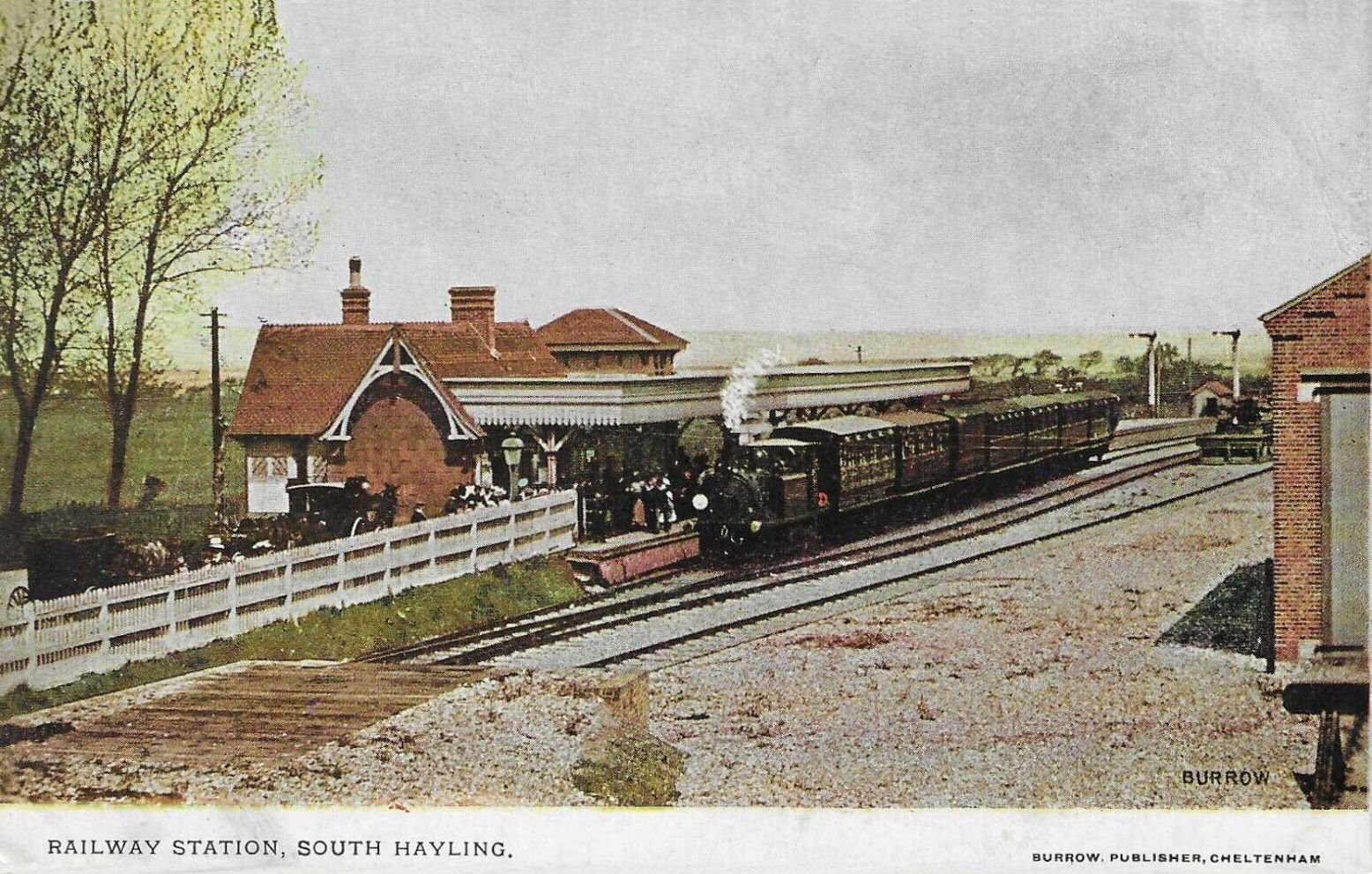
South Hayling station, later Hayling Island station

The train service was operated by Furness, the contractor for the construction. Eventually the company needed to buy capital equipment, including locomotives, and had no means to do so. However the London Brighton and South Coast railway (LBSCR) agreed to lease the line from January 1872, and Furness's operation came to an end. The LBSCR used Stroudley A1 0-6-0 tank engines, known as "Terriers", and four-wheeled coaches.

=== Langstone ===
At the time of the LBSCR taking over the operation, the company started to use the name Langston for the station, although the community was and is spelt Langstone.

In the period 1879 – 1901 the timber viaduct at Langstone was renewed. Its low carrying capacity was always a severe limitation on the rolling stock on the line, and caused the small Terrier locomotives to be the mainstay of the engine power fleet. Four-wheel passenger coaches were used.

=== Motor train working on the Hayling Branch ===
In January 1907 motor-train working was introduced between Havant and Hayling. This consisted of a specially adapted ‘Terrier’ engine and a third class only auto-train trailer coach. With this arrangement the coach was pulled as normal with the engine in front on the outward journey and on the return journey the coach was pushed by the engine at the rear. This avoided the delay in the engine running round at each end of the run. The driver sat in a small compartment at the end of the coach and controlled the engine regulator by levers connected through the coach, and operated the brake by a brake valve at his driving position. The fireman remained on the engine. Initially there was a mechanical connection for the control, but in 1909 it was changed to a pneumatic system. The single class coach was not popular as it had insufficient accommodation for the heavy traffic in the summer months, so during this period normal train operation was reinstated. In addition the running of mixed trains (conveying goods wagons) were awkward to operate under the push-pull system. In 1916 the use of the motor-train was discontinued completely.

=== From 1923 ===
Although the line was leased by the LBSCR, the Hayling Railways Company continued in existence, receiving the regular lease charge. In 1923 however it was absorbed into the Southern Railway under the Grouping of the railways of Great Britain, following the Railways Act 1921.

The road bridge to Hayling Island had a very severe weight restriction. During World War II armaments delivered to the island had to be dismantled at Langstone and transferred to railway vehicles, for transport by rail over the waterway.

Following the Transport Act 1947, the Southern Railway was taken into national ownership under British Railways in 1948.

=== High season operation ===
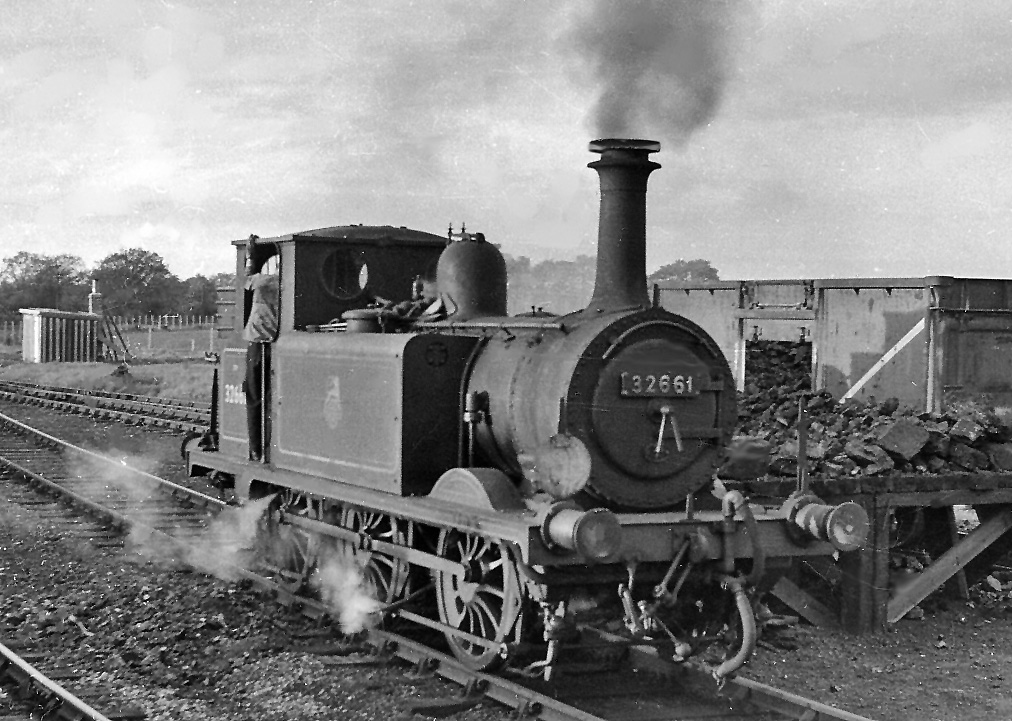
Havant Branch locomotive at Hayling Island in 1958

In the early 1950s it was common for the branch to handle 7,000 passengers in a day, on summer Saturdays. There were three holiday camps on the island in 1963. There was no intermediate crossing place on the line, so the routine was that when a train arrived at Hayling, a loaded train immediately departed. The locomotive of the arriving train was released; the passengers having now disembarked, the locomotive shunted its train to the bay platform. It now loaded and was ready to depart on arrival of the next inward train. At Havant there was only a single bay platform, so on arrival of a train there a waiting light engine attached to the Hayling end of the train and departed for Hayling. As it was travelling away the released engine at Havant moved to an engine spur to await the next arrival. Accordingly, two sets of coaches were almost continuously in motion, using three engines. The engines took water at Havant and coaled at Hayling Island.

In the final years of operation, the branch line passenger service consisted of 15 journeys Monday to Friday, 24 on Saturday and 21 on Sunday.

== Closure ==
Modernisation failed to come to the branch, and the A1X "Terrier" steam locomotives carried on. Although the line was marginally profitable, deterioration of the swing bridge and timber viaduct at Langstone was going to necessitate renewal at a cost of £400,000, and this was considered unaffordable. Instead, closure came on 4 November 1963.

== Isle of Wight wagon ferry ==
From 1885 a train ferry operated from Langstone to Brading on the Isle of Wight. It was the only train ferry to operate to the Isle of Wight, and the first in the south of England.

The paddle steamer Carrier was built at Greenock and launched in 1858 as part of a fleet of train ferries introduced to carry goods wagons across the Firth of Forth and Firth of Tay. She had two tracks on her deck each capable of taking seven railway wagons. In 1883 she was sold to the Isle of Wight Marine Transit Company, who started up a rail freight ferry link between Bembridge Harbour and a newly constructed wharf near to the Hayling railway bridge. The sale included the cradles and winding equipment that had been used at Tayport and Broughty Ferry. The sale price was £3,400. The cradles were movable platforms that ran on ramped rails at the ferry berths, and themselves carried railway rails and a drawbridge section to bridge the final gap to the vessel.

The intention was to enable the transport of coal and other bulk commodities to the island, and cattle from it, by rail without the double transshipment that was otherwise necessary to cross the Solent. It was also thought that cattle might be sent from the island to markets on the mainland.

Carrier made her first Isle of Wight trip on 14 July 1885 from Langstone to Brading; she successfully transported 12 wagons loaded with merchandise and weighing 160 tons. However, by December 1886, the Isle of Wight company was in financial trouble, due to very light demand for the service, and the London Brighton and South Coast Railway agreed to hire Carrier and the quays to keep the operation running. Carrier had a flat bottom and the more exposed seas on the Solent were troublesome, and the ferry was unprofitable; it was discontinued on 31 March 1888. Two lines of wooden piles, which formed part of Langstone wharf, could still (as of 2020) be seen near the remains of the railway bridge.

== Since closure ==
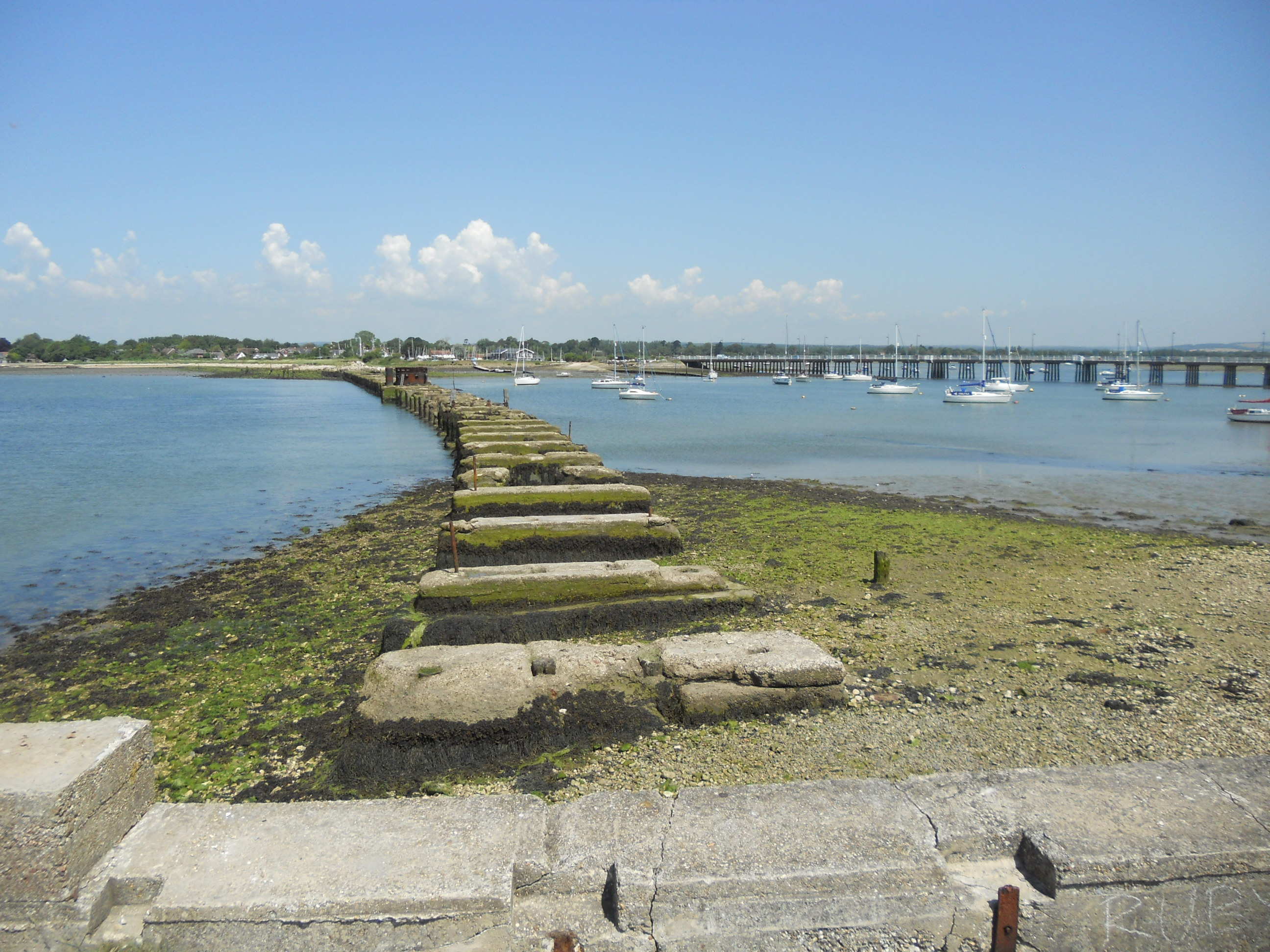
The remains of the railway bridge in 2021; view north towards Langstone

Part of the course of the former railway is a local nature reserve and footpath

In addition, part of the route is designated as the Hayling Billy Cycle Trail.

The old crossing keepers' cottages near Langston railway station unexpectedly caught fire in December 2018 and were almost completely destroyed. The property company owning the site was ordered to rebuild them.

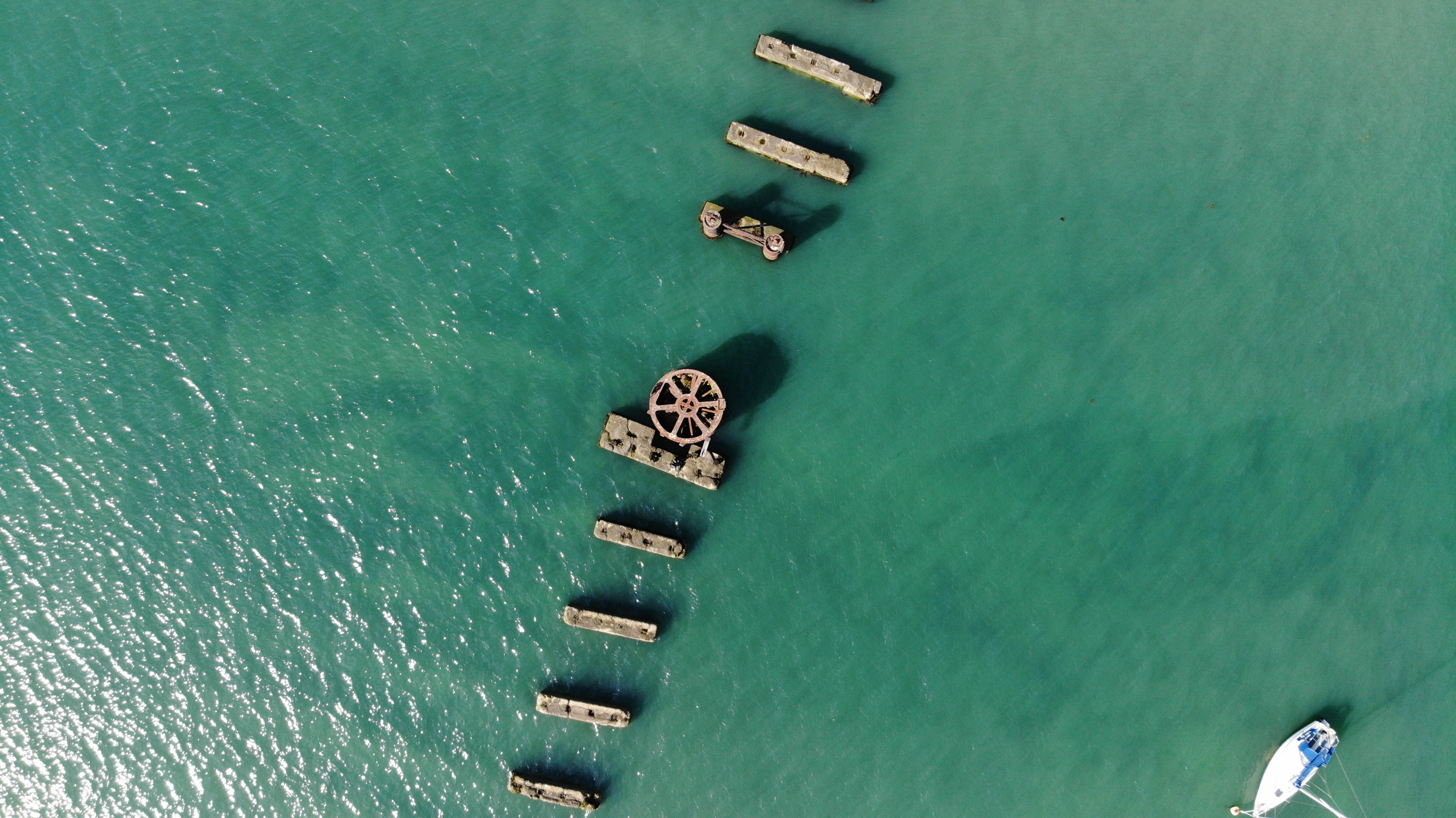
Langstone rail bridge turntable

== Location list ==
- Havant; main line station opened by LBSCR 15 March 1847; still open;
- Langstone; opened 15 July 1867; renamed Langston; closed 4 November 1963;
- North Hayling; opened15 July 1867; closed 4 November 1963;
- Hayling Island; opened 15 July 1867; renamed South Hayling August 1869; renamed Hayling Island 1 June 1892; closed 4 November 1963.

== Gallery ==
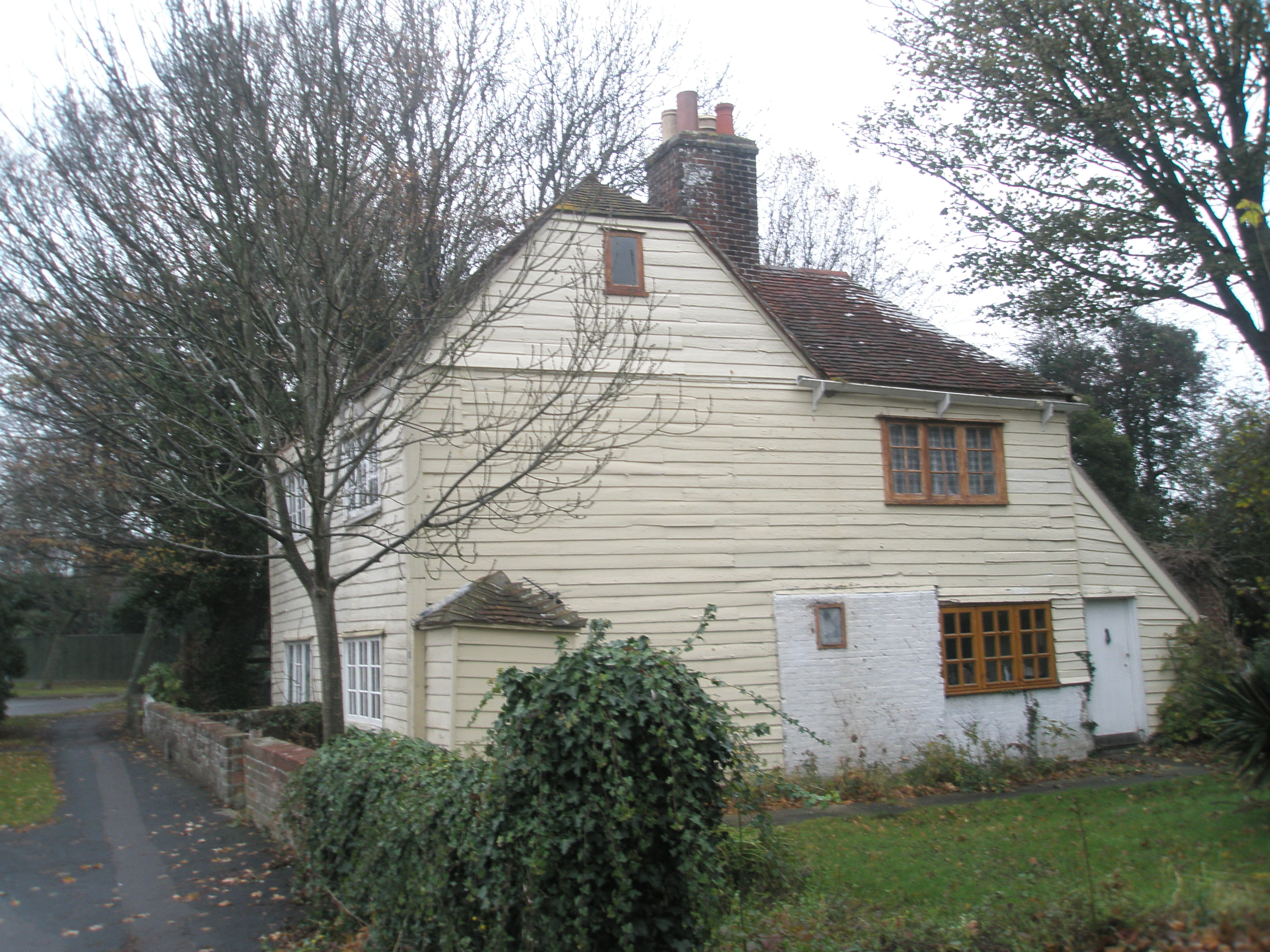
Station Master's House at Langston(e).

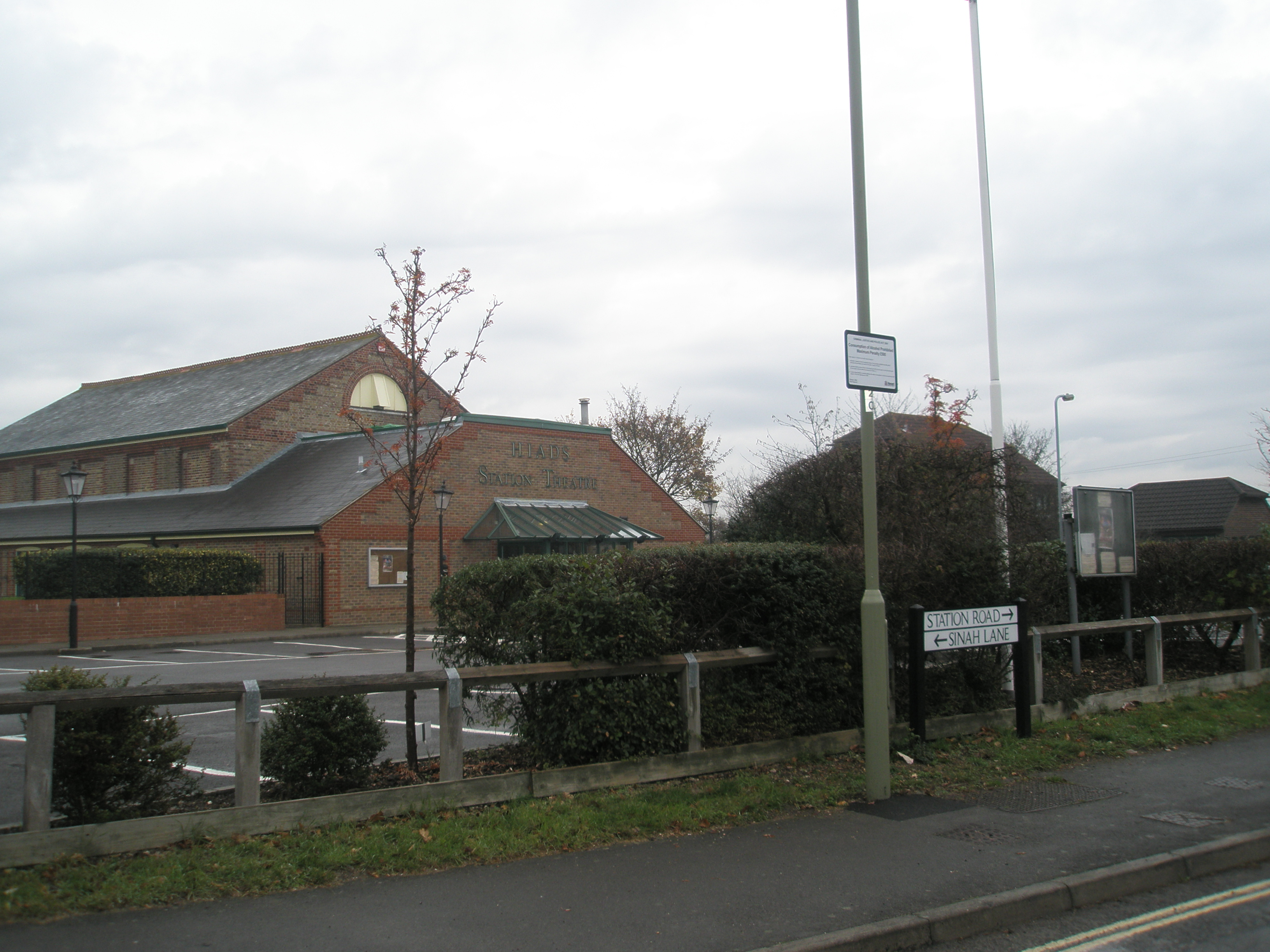
The goods shed at Hayling Island Station is now a Theatre.
