= South Hayling =

Village in Hampshire, England

Coordinates: 50.78°N 0.97°W

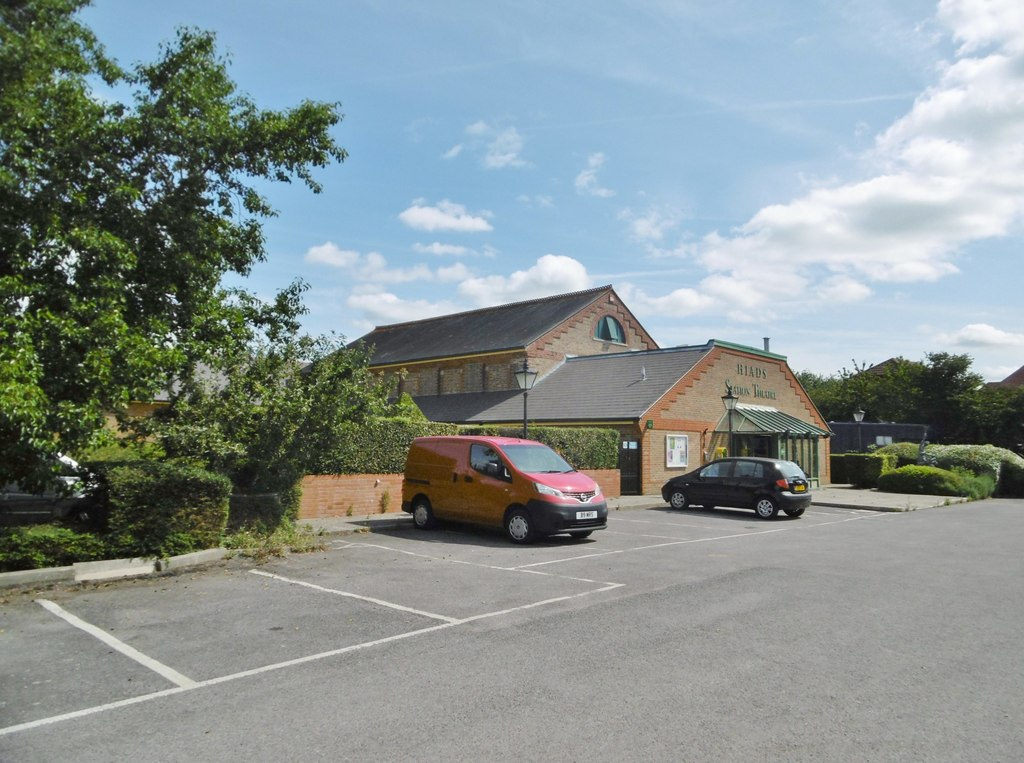

- Location within Hampshire
- Area: 4.737 km^{2} (1.829 sq mi)
- Population: 15,948 (2020 estimate)
  - Density: 3,367/km^{2} (8,720/sq mi)
- District: Havant
- Shire county: Hampshire
- Region: South East
- Country: England
- Sovereign state: United Kingdom
- Post town: HAYLING ISLAND
- Postcode district: PO11
- Dialling code: 023
- Police: Hampshire and Isle of Wight
- Fire: Hampshire and Isle of Wight
- Ambulance: South Central

South Hayling is a village and former civil parish on Hayling Island, about 5 miles from Havant, in the Havant district, in the county of Hampshire, England. In 2020 it had an estimated population of 15,948. South Hayling BUA's classification is a "smaller seaside town". In 1931 the parish had a population of 3254. On 1 April 1932 the parish was abolished and merged with Havant.

== History ==
South Hayling was formerly called Southwood suggesting the island was once heavily wooded, the disappearance of the woodland may be the reason the name was replaced with "South Hayling".
