= Borough of Havant =

Coordinates: 50.85088°N 0.98284°W

- Borough and non-metropolitan district
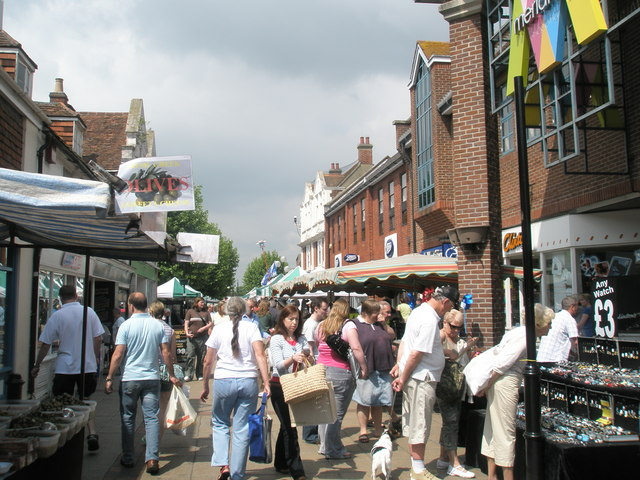
- Pedestrianised section of West Street, Havant, on market day

- Havant shown within Hampshire
- Sovereign state: United Kingdom
- Constituent country: England
- Region: South East England
- Non-metropolitan county: Hampshire
- Status: Non-metropolitan district
- Admin HQ: Havant
- Incorporated: 1 April 1974

Government
  - Type: Non-metropolitan district council
  - Body: Havant Borough Council
  - Control: No overall control
  - MPs: Alan Mak; Suella Braverman

Area
  - Total: 21.4 sq mi (55.3 km^{2})
  - Rank: 238th (of 296)

Population (2025)
  - Total: 127,362
  - Rank: 194th (of 296)
  - Density: 5,970/sq mi (2,300/km^{2})

Ethnicity (2021)
  - Ethnic groups: List: 95.9% White; 1.7% Asian; 1.4% Mixed; 0.6% Black; 0.4% other

Religion (2021)
  - Religion: List: 47.4% no religion; 45.3% Christianity; 5.5% not stated; 0.5% Islam; 0.5% other; 0.3% Buddhism; 0.3% Hinduism; 0.1% Sikhism; 0.1% Judaism
- Time zone: UTC0 (GMT)
  - Summer (DST): UTC+1 (BST)
- ONS code: 24UH (ONS); E07000090 (GSS)
- OS grid reference: SU717062

The Borough of Havant is a local government district with borough status in Hampshire, England. Its council is based in Havant. Other towns and villages within the borough include Bedhampton, Cowplain, Emsworth, Hayling Island, Purbrook, Waterlooville and Widley. The borough covers much of the semi-urban area in the south east of Hampshire, between the city of Portsmouth and the West Sussex border.

== History ==
Havant itself was an ancient parish. Until 1852 it was governed by its vestry, in the same way as most rural areas. The parish was made a local board district in 1852, governed by an elected local board. Such districts were reconstituted as urban districts in 1894. The neighbouring parish of Warblington (which contained Emsworth) was made an urban district at the same time.

The Havant Urban District was substantially enlarged in 1932, taking in the urban district of Warblington and the parishes of Bedhampton, North Hayling, South Hayling and Waterloo, with some adjustments to the boundaries with other neighbouring areas. It was renamed the Havant and Waterloo Urban District, and the whole area was made a single urban parish called Havant.

The Havant and Waterloo Urban District was reconstituted as a non-metropolitan district named just "Havant" by the Local Government Act 1972 on 1 April 1974. The district was granted borough status as part of the 1974 reforms, allowing the chair of the council to take the title of mayor. No successor parish was created for the former urban district.

The Borough of Havant is twinned with Wesermarsch district in Germany and Yavoriv Raion in Western Ukraine.

In March 2026, the government announced that it would abolish the borough in 2028 as part of local government reform across Hampshire. These proposals were withdrawn in September 2026.

== Governance ==
Havant Borough Council

Type
- Type: Non-metropolitan district

Leadership
- Mayor: Paul Tansom, Liberal Democrat since 20 May 2026
- Leader: Gillian Harris, Labour since 20 May 2026
- Chief Executive: Matt Goodwin since 10 November 2025

Structure
- Seats: 36 councillors
- Political groups: Administration (12) Labour (7) Liberal Democrats (5) Other parties (24) Reform (10) Green (6) Conservative (5) Independent (3)
- Length of term: 4 years

Elections
- Last election: 7 May 2026

Meeting place
- Public Service Plaza, Civic Centre Road, Havant, PO9 2AX

Website
- www.havant.gov.uk

Havant Borough Council provides district-level services. County-level services are provided by Hampshire County Council. There are no civil parishes in the borough.

=== Political control ===
The council has been under no overall control since the 2024 election, being run by a Labour-led coalition which also includes the Liberal Democrats and Green Party. Labour ended the coalition with the Greens in November 2026 after a directive from the national Labour Party to local parties not to work with the Greens.

Political control of the council since the 1974 reforms has been as follows:

Party in control	Years
No overall control	1974–1978
Conservative	1978–1990
No overall control	1990–2002
Conservative	2002–2024
No overall control	2024–present

=== Leadership ===
The role of mayor is largely ceremonial in Havant. Political leadership is instead provided by the leader of the council. The leaders since 2001 have been:

Councillor	Party	From	To
David Gillett	Conservative	2001	2008
Tony Briggs	Conservative	2008	May 2014
Mike Cheshire	Conservative	28 May 2014	May 2018
Michael Wilson	Conservative	9 May 2018	May 2021
Alex Rennie	Conservative	19 May 2021	May 2024
Philip Munday	Labour	15 May 2024	May 2026
Gillian Harris	Labour	20 May 2026	

=== Composition ===
Following the 2026 election the composition of the council was:

Party	Councillors
Labour	7
Green	6
Liberal Democrats	5
Reform	10
Conservative	5
Independent	3
Total	36

=== Elections ===
Since the last boundary changes in 2024 the council has comprised 36 councillors representing 12 wards with each ward electing three councillors. Elections are held in three years out of every four, with a third of the council (one councillor for each ward) being elected each time for a four-year term of office. Hampshire County Council elections are held in the fourth year of the cycle when there are no borough council elections.

=== Premises ===
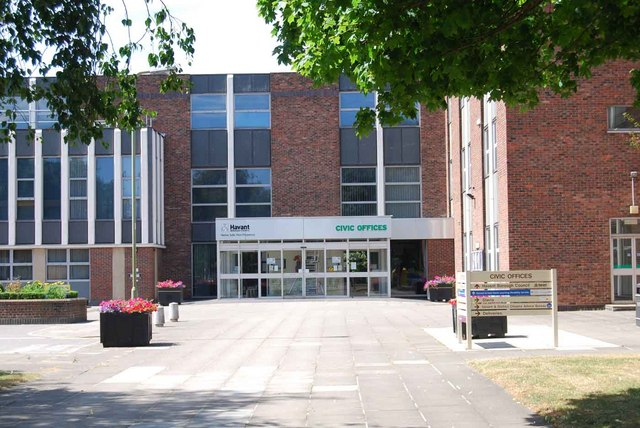
Civic Offices, photographed in 2010 prior to being extended and renamed Public Service Plaza

The council is based at the Public Service Plaza on Civic Centre Road in Havant. The building was previously called Civic Offices and had been built in 1977, replacing the old Town Hall on East Street in the centre of Havant, which subsequently became The Spring Arts & Heritage Centre. A large extension was added to the Civic Offices in 2011 to incorporate some Hampshire County Council offices and space for voluntary organisations as well, after which the building was renamed Public Service Plaza.

=== Members of Parliament ===
As of 2024, the boundaries of Havant borough mostly coincide with the parliamentary constituency of Havant, represented by Alan Mak, former Shadow Secretary of State for Science, Innovation and Technology. The northwestern Cowplain and Hart Plain wards lie in the constituency of Fareham and Waterlooville, represented by former attorney general and home secretary Suella Braverman.

== See also ==
- List of places of worship in the Borough of Havant
