= Tourner Bury =

Area of Hayling Island, Hampshire, England

Coordinates: 50.79407°N 0.96421°W

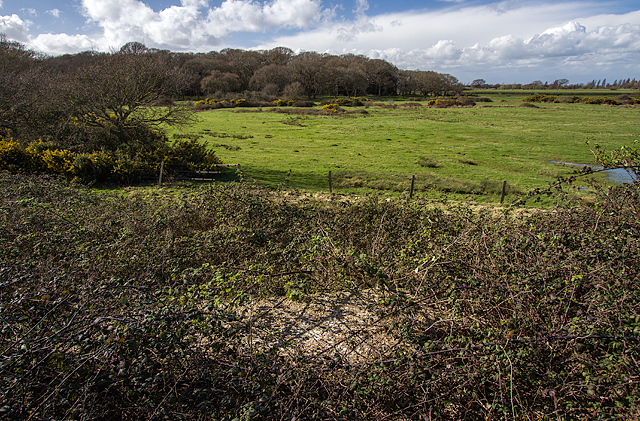
Tournerbury Marsh

Tourner Bury is an area on Hayling Island, Hampshire, England, lying east of Mengham. As well as woodland, the area is the site of an Iron Age hill fort, which was the scene of small-scale rampart excavations in 1959 and 1971.

A golf course lies to the north of Tournerbury Wood. To the south is Mengham Rythe and to the east Chichester Harbour.
