= Hayling Ferry =

Foot passenger ferry in Hampshire, England

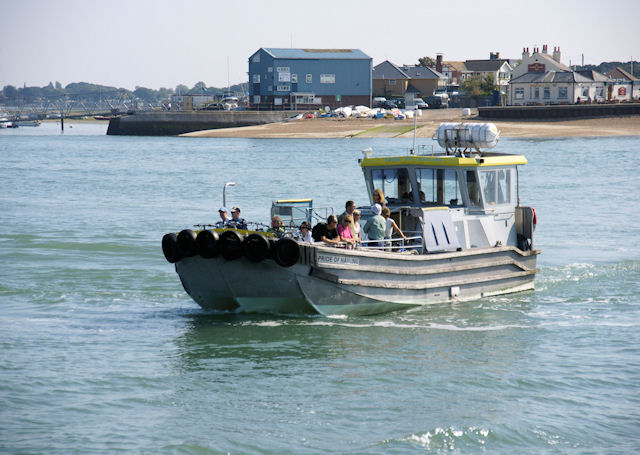
- Locale: Hampshire, England
- Waterway: Langstone Harbour
- Operator: Baker Trayte Marine
- Began operation: 1850 or earlier
- No. of vessels: 1
- No. of terminals: 2
- Website: http://www.haylingferry.net

The Hayling Ferry is a foot passenger ferry across the mouth of Langstone Harbour linking the Ferry Point on the west tip of Hayling Island with Eastney, Portsmouth on Portsea Island. The current owner, Baker Trayte Marine Ltd, has operated the ferry since August 2016 following a period of cessation when the previous operation fell into administration in March 2015.

The ferry operates throughout the year and conveys schoolchildren, commuters, tourists and cyclists. The summer is busier than the winter. The ferry is scheduled to run hourly but will run more frequently in peak times and if the ferry becomes full. Bicycles are conveyed subject to space.

The tidal currents at the Ferry Point are treacherous and have claimed many lives over the years.

== History ==
It is claimed that a regular ferry service has run since before 1850, possible even from the 18th century. Rights to run a ferry had passed to the Duke of Norfolk to whom the rights as Lord of the manor of Hayling island had passed on dissolution of the monasteries. The rights were sold to a Mr. William Padwick Esq. in 1825.

Hayling Island Steam Ferry Company was formed in 1901 the venture bought the ferry rights but folded soon after due to the unsuitability of the steam vessel. While a Mr. Sandeman (members of the Sandeman (port wine) family have resided on the Island since 1824) had prepared significant infrastructure including pontoons and the construction of Ferry Road across Sinah Common and The Kench on the Hayling side he discovered the vessel was unable to transport a carriage and was restricted to foot passengers.

At some point after the demise of the earlier enterprise utilising the pontoons built for the steam vessel, George Spraggs, the licensee of the tavern on the Hayling side, began operated the ferry using motor boats with his sons until his drowning in 1922. Following their father's death the sons Cecil, George and Jack continued the operation until 1961. They seem also to have been joined by an Alan Spraggs, and Cecil was the engineer. They typically used 3 boats, two in service and one in the boatshed.

The Spraggs were also proprietors of The Ferry Boat Inn and its predecessor the Norfolk Lodge (Inn) which was mutually beneficial to the Hayling Ferry operation. Even as early as 1901 they were rebranding the Norfolk Lodge Inn as the Hayling Ferry Tavern.

Portsmouth Council took over and operated the route from 1960, introducing the Iris in 1968 and the Irene in 1974 to the service. In 1978 they also briefly introduced a tourist service direct from Southsea using the Folkestone Belle. The service closed in April 1981.

The Hayling Island Ferry company took over operation of the ferry in 1985 using the Hayling Enterprise. Hampshire County Council wished the service to be re-instated and was prepared to provide a subsidy. Initially it was necessary to run onto the beach as the pontoon on the Eastney side had deteriorated so badly . After the restoration of the pontoon the company purchased the 65 seat Pride of Hayling which entered operation in 1989. In 2009 after 28000 hours of service the Pride of Hayling had its engines renewed. Various maintenance, subsidy, operating and financial difficulties and incidents accumulated to bring the company into receivership.

The Pride of Hayling went in for what proved to be extensive maintenance repairs at the end of 2013, with the 12 seat Tina Marie sourced to continue the service in the interim from January 2014. Repairs took over 10 months and money was owed to the repairers. This ferry ceased operating in March 2015 with the company going into receivership.

Receivers sold the boats to realise compensation for creditors. It was hoped that someone would purchase the Pride of Hayling and get the service running again quickly.

In August 2015, Baker Trayte Marine, an established marine contractor, purchased the Pride of Hayling with the intention of reinstating the ferry service from Ferry Point on Hayling Island to Eastney Point on the Portsmouth side.

The new service was launched on 5 August 2016 following strenuous efforts to attain the required subsidies needed by the Baker Trayte Business Plan, including £15,155 by the Hayling Ferry Trust and £5000 from Richard Branson among others.

In 2018 it was reported that while the ferry was popular and financially viable over the summer months the winter patronage was low and unprofitable. The public funding reserves of £20,000 had almost been fully used up and it might be necessary to curtail services in the remaining winter months. The owners and a fundraising group hoped a County Council subsidy could be re-instated and stated the difficulties that were arising because a bus-link could not be re-established on the Hayling side.

== Boats ==
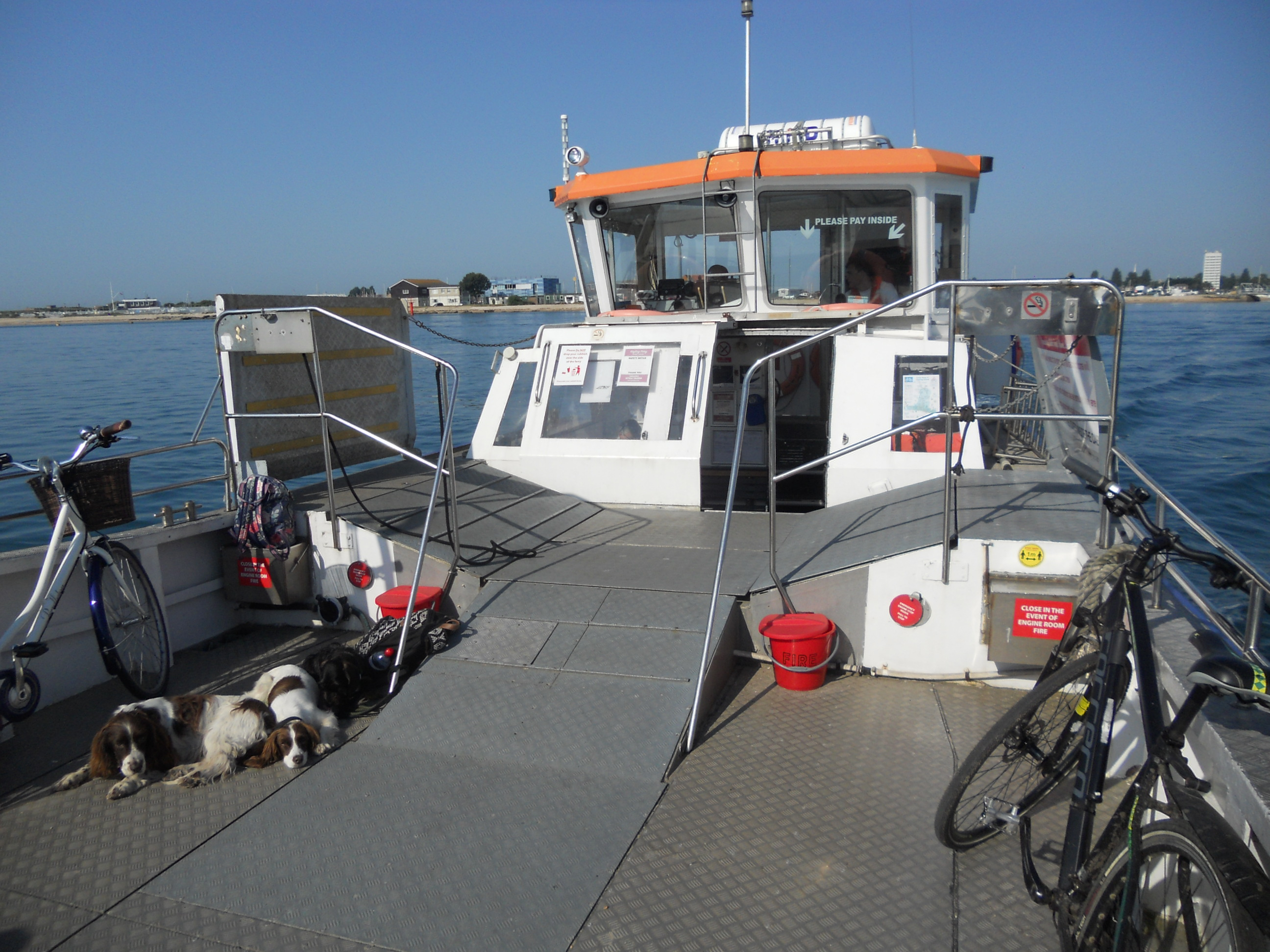
On board Pride of Hayling

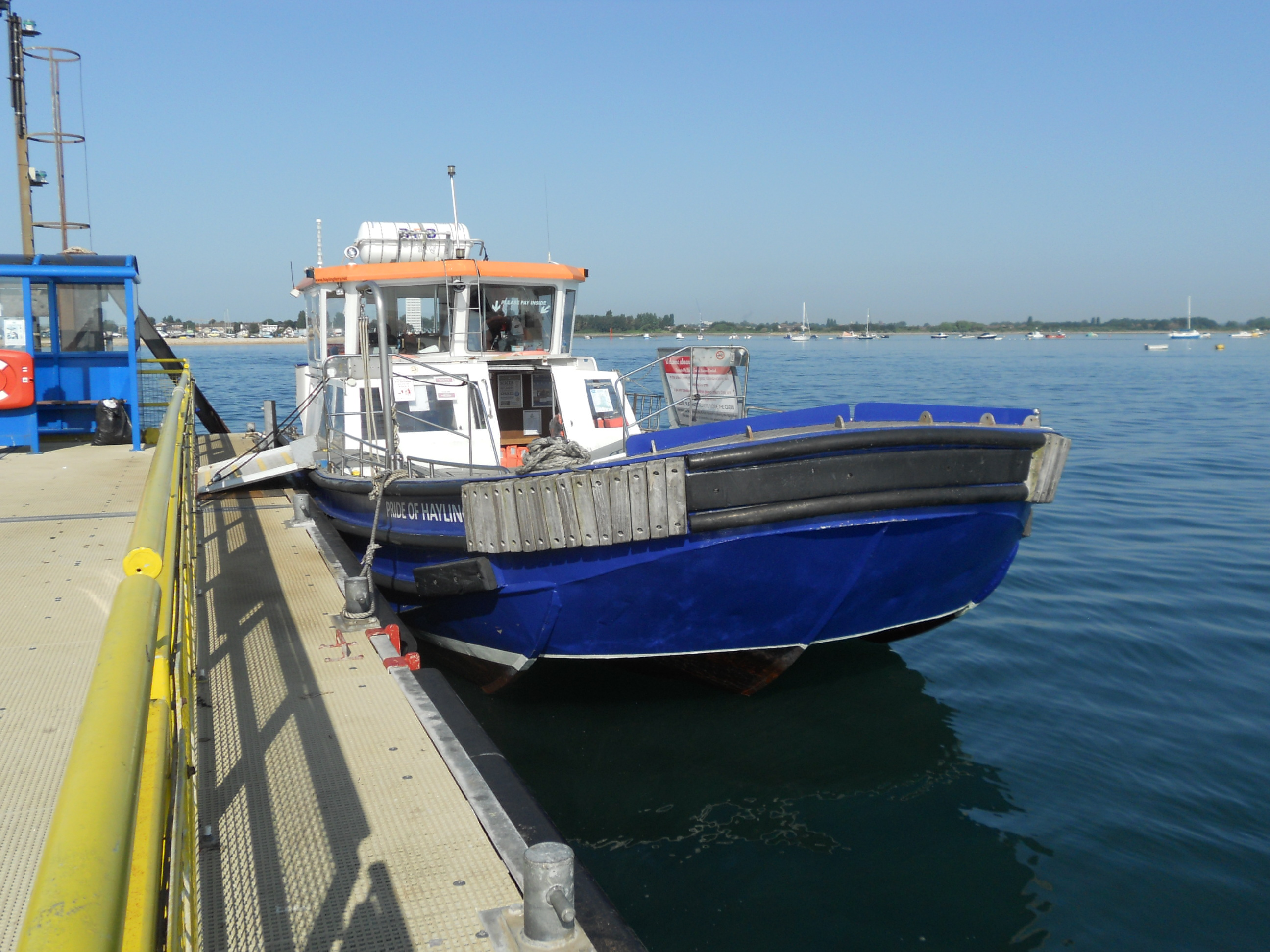
Pride of Hayling docked at Hayling Island

- Unknown steam vessel of 1901 – It proved unsuccessful and was withdrawn after a short while. It was unable to transport a carriage.
- Folkestone Belle – Built in 1928 by H Gale & Co. of Cowes. By 1940 it was a Hayling ferry and in 1940 participated in the evacuation at Dunkirk. It was subsequently renamed Southsea Belle
- Sinah – A motor boat known to operate in the 1950s, less substantial than Folkestone Belle. There may have been more than one boat named Sinah.
- Tarpon – A motor boat known to operate in the 1950s, less substantial than Folkestone Belle.
- Teal
- Iris – A 55-seater introduced to the route in 1968.
- Irene – Introduced to the route in 1976.
- Hayling Enterprise – In service 1985–2001. Introduced with the resumption of the service in 1985 this boat could land on the beach at Eastney until the pontoon was repaired
- Pride of Hayling – Introduced in 1987/1989 it was apparently specified for the Hayling-Eastney route and based on designs for a boat in use in Australia. It is an 11-ton 64/65 seat vessel and remains the current boat.
- Tina Marie – An 11m long single-engine boat with capacity of 12 passengers and 2 crew. Believed to have been ex-tender to HMS Illustrious. Sold by the Hayling Island Ferries receiver and no longer on the route.

== Incidents ==
- In April 1922 the proprietor George Spraggs drowned after slipping while attempting to save his son George, who had fallen in and was being held by his other son Cecil.
- In December 2010 the Pride of Hayling failed a second safety inspection by the Maritime and Coastguard Agency and was taken out of service.
- On four crossings during January and February 2014 the Tina Marie (which was certified to carry 12 passengers) was found to have landed between 16 and 27 passengers. On 23 September 2014 the Maritime and Coastguard Agency successfully prosecuted the vessel's owner, operator and master; they were fined a total of £12,340. It was noticed there was insufficient lifejacket and life raft capacity for the numbers carried.
- On 7 October 2014, the Tina Marie was taken out of service after damaging itself hitting the Hayling Pontoon

== Alternative route ==
When the ferry has been closed the only public connection between Hayling Island and the mainland is a single carriageway road linking Northney to Langstone, Havant. Particularly in summer this road can become very congested rendering the journey between the bridge and South Hayling (the most populated area) anything from 30 minutes to an hour. When the ferry has been closed this has been found to affect businesses on South Hayling.

In 1886 there was a proposal to construct a branch off the Havant to Hayling railway line and to cross Langstone Harbour with a 900 ft road and rail swing bridge. In 1903 a scheme for a 720 ft Traveller Suspension Bridge conveying a 60 ft by 30 ft suspended car from one side to the other. A proposed Millennium project to create a new shared pedestrian and cycle bridge was unsuccessful.

== Connecting services ==
There is a bus service on the Portsmouth side however the bus service to the ferry point on the Hayling side ceased in 2004. Efforts to re-instate a bus service to the ferry on the Hayling side have taken place at various times and have proved unsuccessful until in July 2018 Havant councillors approved a £20,000 community bus trial planned to commence shortly thereafter with funding from the Community Infrastructure Levy. In September 2018 after months of discussions arrangements have been made for connecting bus services by First Hampshire & Dorset at Eastney and by a twenty seater community bus on Hayling. The connecting service on Hayling commenced on 24 September 2018 and the trial is to run for six months.
