= Newman Darby =

American inventor

- Born: Sidney Newman Darby; January 31, 1928; Wilkes-Barre, Pennsylvania
- Died: December 3, 2016 (aged 88); St. Johns, Florida
- Spouse: Naomi Albrecht
- Children: 2

Sidney Newman Darby Jr. (January 31, 1928 – December 3, 2016) was an American inventor best known as the inventor of the sailboard.

== Biography ==
He was born in 1928 and grew up in Wilkes-Barre, Pennsylvania and began building boats when he was 12. His first boat sank, but he fished it out of the Susquehanna River, near his home, and made it into a home for snakes.

Darby and his wife made their home in Saint Johns, Florida, where he died on December 3, 2016, at the age of 88.

=== Sailboard ===
Darby is known and recognized by some as the first person to develop an early version of the sailboard. He had applied for a patent but due to cost he gave up on patenting. He developed the early craft and marketed it nationally, selling a hundred boards. Darby first conceived of a hand-operated square sail attached to a catamaran in 1948, when he was 20. In the mid-1960s, Darby conceived the "Darby Sailboard": a hand-held square rigged "kite" sail on a floating platform for recreational use. The craft, sailed with the operator’s back to the sail, was difficult to operate in strong and gusty winds, in particular because the boom could be handled from only one side of the sail.

Darby had taught himself to sail a 10-foot model on lakes in high wind between 1964 and 1965. He published his design in August 1965 Popular Science magazine, which exhibited a primitive rope universal joint and referred to a "more complex swivel step for advanced riders not shown." The sail was like a kite and was sailed with one's back to the sail. Popular Science magazine was published in many countries around the world, establishing the Darby sailboard as "prior art" in several legal jurisdictions.

Soon after Darby published his Sailboard design in Popular Science Jim Drake, a California based aeronautical engineer, created a significantly more modern sailboard design and patented it. Drake's version incorporated a wishbone boom that allowed the operator to stand and face the sail from the windward position. This dramatically improved performance. Other improvement found in Drake’s concept were more efficient hull shape, advanced engineering of the overall design, a triangular sail and a better universal joint design. Taken together, Drake’s improvements can be seen as essential to allowing the sport of windsurfing to experience world wide popularity. Drake’s original scientific paper titled “Windsurfing – a new concept in sailing” was revolutionary and represented a clear departure from Darby’ earlier development. Drake’s paper was published by Rand in 1969.

Darby and his wife Naomi organized Darby Industries, Inc. in 1964, with his brother, Kenneth, was also active in the company. However, their sailboard design never gained popularity, and Darby's company ceased operations by the end of the 1960s. His early free sail concept was primitively related to modern windsurfing however, which became an international Olympic sport in later years.

=== Windsurfer patent cases ===
Darby did not patent his original craft or any of his subsequent models. Californians Jim Drake (a sailor and aeronautical engineer) and Hoyle Schweitzer (a businessman) took out the sport’s first patent based on Drake's Windsurfer design in 1968. Drake reportedly had no knowledge of Darby’s craft when he invented his own version, however the free sail system created by Darby was already in public use when Jim Drake’s Windsurfer patent was awarded.

Windsurfing was developed commercially through the company Windsurfing International Inc., which Jim Drake and Hoyle Schweitzer started out of Jim Drake’s private home in Santa Monica, California in 1968. Drake was soon pressured by Schweitzer to relinquish his half of the patent, which he reluctantly sold for $36,000 in 1974. Schweitzer expanded the company through licensing the patent internationally. However, Europe was now the largest growing market for windsurfers, and the sub-licensed companies - Tabur (later Bic Sport), F2, Mistral - wanted to find a way to remove or reduce their royalty payments to Windsurfing International.

Tabur lawyers found prior art, in Englishman Peter Chilvers, who as a young boy on Hayling Island on the south coast of England, assembled his first board combined with a sail, in 1958.

In Windsurfing International Inc. v Tabur Marine (GB) Ltd, with Tabur backed financially by French sailing fanatic Baron Marcel Bich, British courts recognized the prior art of Peter Chilvers. It did not incorporate the curved wishbone booms of the modern windsurfer, but rather a "straight boom" that became curved in use. The courts found that the Schweitzer windsurfer boom was "merely an obvious extension". It is worthy of note that this court case set a significant precedent for patent law in the United Kingdom, in terms of inventive step and non-obviousness; the court upheld the defendant's claim that the Schweitzer patent was invalid, based on film footage of Chilvers. Schweitzer then sued the company in Canada, where the opposition team again financially backed by Bic included Chilvers and Jim Drake, and lost again. After the cases, no longer obliged to pay Windsurfing International and royalty payments, the now renamed Bic Sport became the world’s largest producer of windsurfing equipment, with an annual production of 15,000 boards.

In 1983, Schweitzer sued Swiss board manufacturer Mistral, and lost. Although started before the British case, it ended after the closure of the Canadian case, with Mistral's defence hinging on the work of Darby.

In the 1980s, Darby received a design patent for a one-person sailboat, the Darby 8 SS sidestep hull. His latest project is called the Windspear, a combination kayak, canoe, and surfboard, with a paddle and fin combination. Darby's latest design (2006/2007) is being tested, timed and fine tuned.
