= West Town =

West Town or Westtown may refer to any of the following places.

== United Kingdom ==
- West Town, Peterborough in Cambridgeshire
- West Town, Hayling Island in Hampshire
- West Town, Backwell in North Somerset

== United States ==
- West Town, Chicago in Illinois
- Westtown, New York, a hamlet
- Westtown Township, Pennsylvania

== See also ==
- West Town Academy in Chicago
- West Town Mall in Knoxville, Tennessee
- West Towne Mall in Madison, Wisconsin
- Westtown School in West Chester, Pennsylvania
- Westtown station in Pennsylvania
- West Township (disambiguation)
