= Jim Drake (engineer) =

American aeronautical engineer (1929 – 2012)

Jim Drake

Jim Drake (January 8, 1929 – June 19, 2012) was an American aeronautical engineer who invented the sport of windsurfing. In 1967, Drake designed, built, and successfully tested the first modern windsurfer, introducing the free-sail system, which allows the rider’s body to control both the power of the sail and direction of the board without a rudder, which is a steering device found on traditional sailboats. In 1968, he co-patented his design and co-founded the sport's first company, Windsurfing International, contributing the core foundation to the global development of the sport.

Before inventing the Windsurfer, Drake worked as a principal engineer on advanced aerospace projects, including the X-15 rocket plane, the first operational space plane and the fastest crewed aircraft ever flown. His application of aerospace engineering principles to sailcraft design was central to his inventing windsurfing.

== Early life and education ==
Drake earned a bachelor’s degree in mechanical engineering, with an option in aeronautics, from Stanford University in 1951. He grew up in Southern California, where he enjoyed sailing, surfing, and skiing, activities that later influenced his recreational engineering work.

== Aeronautics career ==
Following graduation, Drake began his professional career at North American Aviation in Los Angeles. He worked in the advanced design group as a principal engineer on experimental and classified aerospace programs. Among the projects he contributed to were the X-15 rocket plane, which established altitude and speed records for crewed flight, and the XB-70 Valkyrie high-altitude bomber.

Drake later worked for Rockwell International and the RAND Corporation. He was also a co-founder of R&D Associates (RDA), a technical research and analysis firm. During the Cold War, his career included periods of work associated with the Pentagon, contributing to studies and development related to intercontinental ballistic missile systems and cruise missile technology. Drake retired from aerospace engineering in 1998 after a career spanning nearly five decades.

== Invention of windsurfing ==
Drake began developing the concept of a sail-powered surfboard in the early 1960s, initially discussing the idea with fellow engineer and sailor Fred Payne. His goal was to create a portable sailing craft that could be controlled directly by the rider without the complexity of traditional sailboats.

In 1966, Drake shared the concept with businessman Hoyle Schweitzer. Drake subsequently completed the engineering design, introducing the free-sail system using a universal joint, wishbone boom, daggerboard, and triangular sail. He constructed the first prototype largely by hand in his Santa Monica garage.

On May 21, 1967, Drake conducted the first successful sailing tests in Marina del Rey, California. Further refinements followed, including adding an uphaul line and conducting open-water testing off the coast of Santa Monica. The design proved viable and controllable, forming the basis of modern windsurfing equipment.

== Windsurfing International and patent ==
In 1968, Drake and Schweitzer jointly patented the windsurfer design and founded Windsurfing International to manufacture and license the product. The company’s original board was marketed under the name Windsurfer, a term that later became the name of the sport itself.

Drake sold his share of the patent to Schweitzer in 1973. During the 1970s and 1980s, Windsurfing International licensed production worldwide, contributing to the rapid global expansion of windsurfing. Subsequent patent disputes examined earlier sailboard concepts by inventors such as Peter Chilvers and Newman Darby; Drake acknowledged these prior developments while maintaining that his work represented the first fully functional and commercially viable system.

== Later design work and innovations ==
Building on the original windsurfer, Drake continued to design sailboards and related equipment. In 1981, he invented and co-patented a handheld Wing sail along with journalist Ullrich Stanciu. Drake's wing design was the precursor to all modern wing foiling equipment used today.

From the late 1990s, until his passing in 2012, Drake collaborated with Svein Rasmussen at the windsurfing manufacturer Starboard. Together, they developed innovative board designs, including the Formula class, characterized by short, wide boards optimized for light-wind racing. Drake’s later work influenced modern windsurfing, stand-up paddleboarding (SUP), and foiling board design.

== Death ==
Drake died on June 19, 2012, at his home in Pfafftown, North Carolina, from complications related to lung disease. He was 83 years old.

== Legacy ==
Drake is widely recognized for applying aerospace engineering principles to recreational watercraft design. His work on the X-15 and other advanced aerospace projects, combined with his inventions of windsurfing and winging, establishes a dual legacy in both aerospace engineering and sport innovation.
