= Rythe =

A rythe, or rithe, is a small stream, or a creek or inlet from a salt water harbour. The term is in common usage in the South of England.

Examples include:

- The Rythe, a small river in Surrey
- Mengham Rythe, Hayling Island, Hampshire
- Mill Rythe, Hayling Island, Hampshire
