= Chilvers =

Chilvers is a surname. Notable people with the surname include:

- Colin Chilvers (1945-2024), English film director and special effects coordinator
- Liam Chilvers, English footballer
- Noah Chilvers, English footballer
- Peter Chilvers, engineer
- Peter Chilvers (musician)
