= Hiad =

Hiad or variation, may refer to:

- NASA Hypersonic Inflatable Aerodynamic Decelerator
- High Adhesion truck (HiAd); see List of GE locomotives
- HIAD 650 AM, Santo Domingo, Dominican Republic; a radio station

== See also ==
- Hayling Island Amateur Dramatic Society (HIADS), Station Theatre (Hayling Island), Hayling Island, Hampshire, England, UK
