= West Town, Hayling Island =

Village in Hampshire, England

Coordinates: 50.7898°N 0.9878°W

West Town
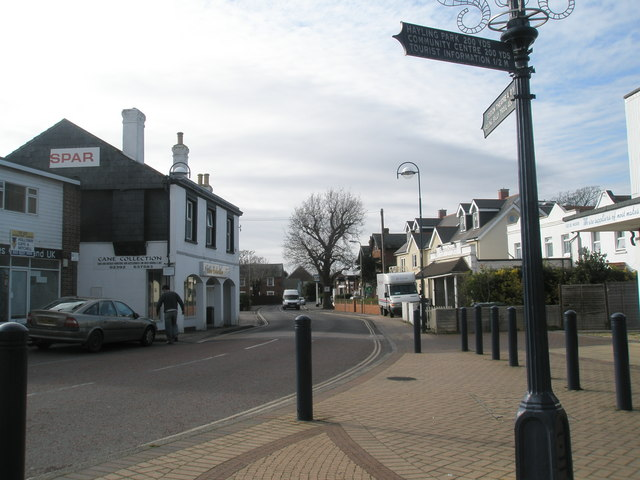
- Town centre

- Location within Hampshire
- OS grid reference: SZ7144499044
- District: Havant
- Shire county: Hampshire
- Region: South East
- Country: England
- Sovereign state: United Kingdom
- Post town: HAYLING ISLAND
- Postcode district: PO11
- Dialling code: 023
- Police: Hampshire and Isle of Wight
- Fire: Hampshire and Isle of Wight
- Ambulance: South Central
- UK Parliament: Havant

West Town is a village on Hayling Island in the borough of Havant in the county of Hampshire, England. It is on the south coast of the island, between Sinah to the west and Eastoke to the east. The wide area between the seafront road and the sea is known as Beachlands.

== History ==
William Padwick was responsible for the development of West Town in the mid nineteenth century. The name Beachlands for the common to the sea is understood to have been coined by George Henry How, the adopted son of Sophia Budd who bought Norfolk House from William Padwick's estate after his death.

== Culture and community ==
=== Culture ===
- The Station Theatre is converted from the South Hayling Goods shed at the end of the Hayling Billy trail on the disused Hayling Island branch line.

=== Community ===
- The Hayling Island Community Centre is situated in Hayling Park

== Landmarks ==
- Royal hotel, a grade II listed building now used for apartments.
- The Royal Shades, a grade II listed public house.

== Sport and leisure ==
- The Blue Flag beach is a suitable for safe bathing
- A pitch and put and putting green is present at the west end of Beachlands near the Inn on the Beach
- Funland Amusement Park, an amusement park
- The southern end of the Hayling Billy trail is at Station Road, West Town.
- The current western terminus of the Hayling Seaside Railway is at Beachlands.

== Notable people ==
- William Padwick, Lord of the manor of Hayling Island foresaw the development of West Town and Beachlands in the 1900s.

== Transport ==
- West town is on the 30(anticlockwise)/31(clockwise) route operated by Stagecoach South that runs a circular route round the south of Hayling Island before returning to Havant for onward rail and bus connections.
