= Sinah, Hayling Island =

Coordinates: 50.790117°N 1.015652°W

Sinah
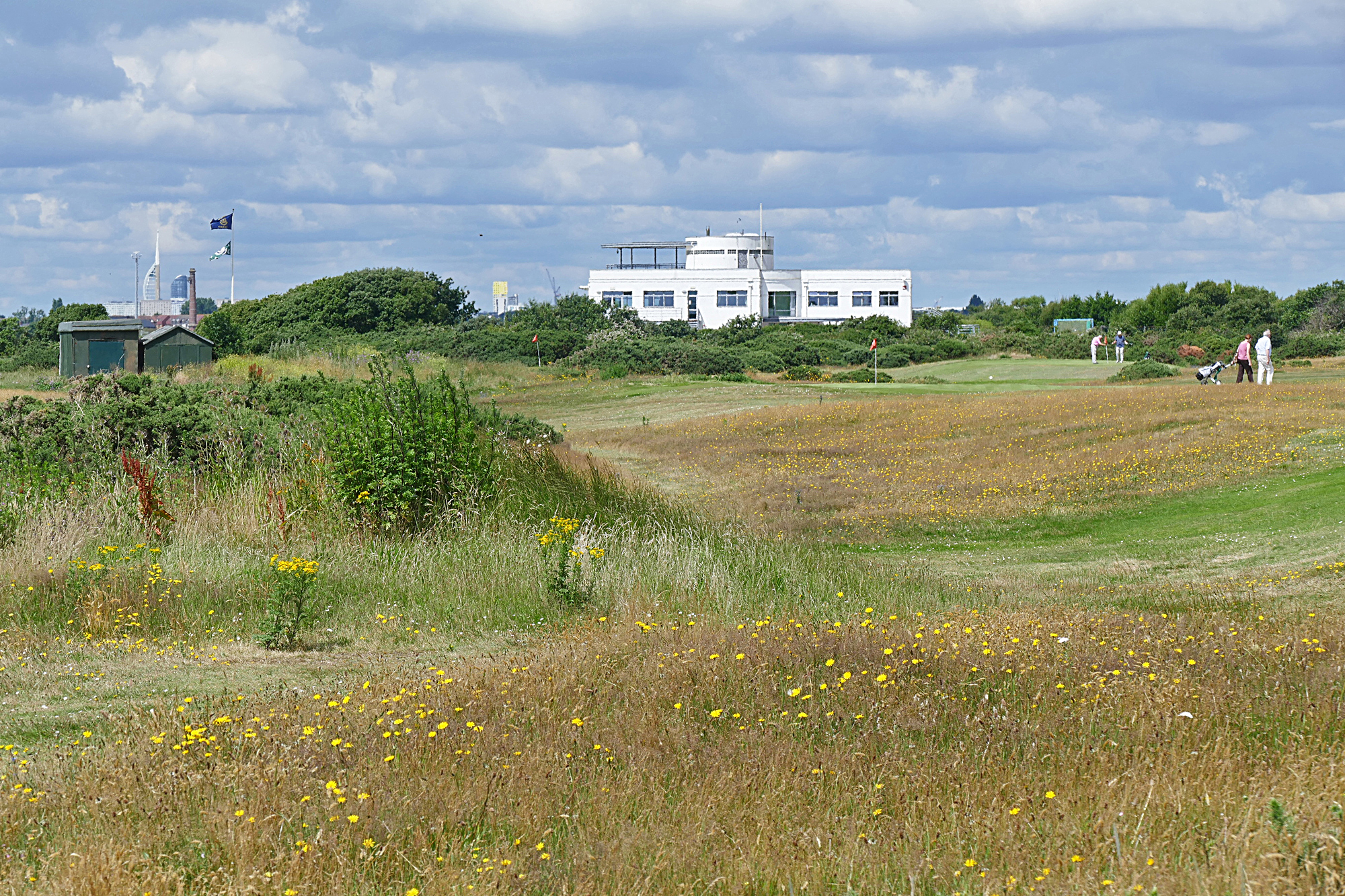
- Sinah Common golf course

- Location within Hampshire
- OS grid reference: SZ6948099411
- District: Havant
- Shire county: Hampshire
- Region: South East
- Country: England
- Sovereign state: United Kingdom
- Post town: HAYLING ISLAND
- Postcode district: PO11
- Dialling code: 023
- Police: Hampshire and Isle of Wight
- Fire: Hampshire and Isle of Wight
- Ambulance: South Central
- UK Parliament: Havant

Sinah is the area at the southwestern end of Hayling Island. It incorporates the Ferrypoint, Sinah Beach, The Kench, Sinah Warren, and Sinah Common. It is bounded to the east by West Town. Langstone Harbour and its entrance form the north and west borders, and to the south is Hayling Bay.

== History ==
Monks had settled in the Sinah Warren by the 15th century. Fishermen's huts were present in the shelter of the Kench by the 19th century. The Norkfolk Inn, precursor to the Ferry Boat Inn, was created to serve the needs of the fishermen. Around 1900 Sandeman set out to extend a road out to the ferrypoint for the Hayling Island Steamboat enterprise. While that enterprise failed the road did assist subsequent development of the Hayland Island Ferry, golf course, health farm and the war effort for the Second World War. In recent years land use of Sinah has stabilised with various areas being designated nature reserves.

== The Ferry Point ==
The Ferry Point is at the westernmost tip of Hayling Island in Hampshire, England, overlooking the fast tides of Langstone Harbour entrance. It was previously known as Sinah Point.

The current at the Ferry Point is extremely treacherous and has claimed many lives over the years.

There is a small cluster of houses and a pub, the "Ferry Boat Inn" (originally the Duke of Norfolk). Continuing directly past the pub leads to a slipway directly into the water. A fork to the left leads past the base of the Langstone Harbour Master to the jetty for the passenger ferry to Eastney in Portsmouth.

The Hayling Island golf course backs on to the point and the Kench (a small bay) lies just eastward. A single lane leads east toward the rest of the island. There are good views north to Portsdown Hill and Butser Hill.

== Sinah Beach ==
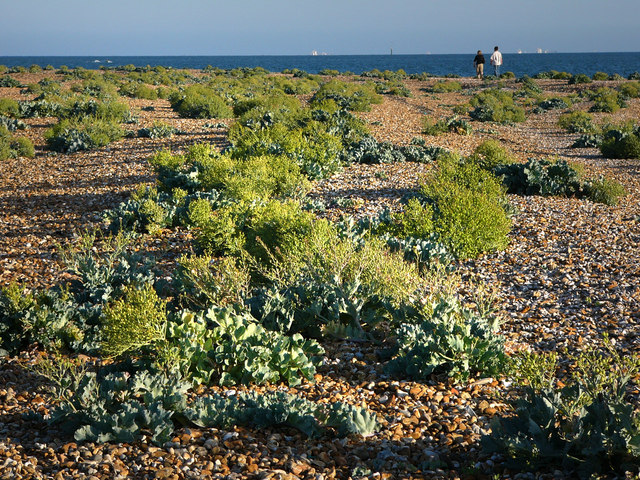
Beach at Sinah

Sinah Beach extends from the Ferry Boat Inn at the western end of Hayling Island.

== Sinah Warren ==
Sinah Warren is the area to north of Ferry Road where the Holiday Camp is located. Monks initially had a settlement here by the 15th century, and it is jokingly put this was the first health farm on the site. The 16th century saw the monks displaced and the rights sold to the Duke of Norfolk. It may have been sold to William Padwick, Esq. in 1825. Sold to August Arbuthnot in the 1930s he built the Sinah Warren Residence and planted various species of plants and trees from his worldwide travels and established one of the first Factory Farms, initially with Angora Rabbits then with Poultry to help alleviate the food shortage in the Second World War. The Royal Navy then took over Sinah Warren until the 1950s when it was sold and developed into the current holiday camp.

== Sinah Common ==
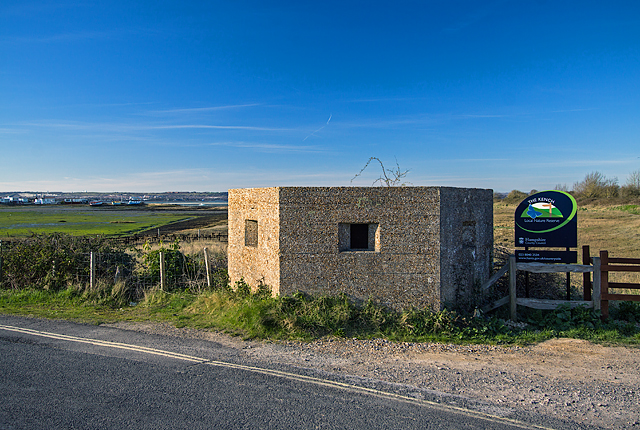
World War II pillbox

Sinah Common is the area to the south of Ferry Road incorporating the Golf course. The area is now a Site of Special Scientific Interest. The area of water in front of the clubhouse is seemingly nowadays referred to as Sinah Lake although an area within Langstone Harbour that forms a lake at low tide is also known as Sinah Lake. Elements of World War 2 gun batteries and pill boxes are well preserved in this area.

== The Kench ==
The Kench is a small natural inlet to the north of Ferry Road. Proposals to change this into a commercial port or marina foundered or were thwarted, and the area is now a designated nature reserve with a handful of houseboats permitted.

== Landmarks and places of interest ==
=== Ferry Boat Inn ===
The inn was known previously by various titles: as the "Norfolk Inn", "Norfolk Lodge (Inn)", "Hayling Ferry Tavern", and the "Duke of Norfolk". The original Norfolk Inn was present before 1776, built to the east of The Kench on the north side of the ferry point. The replacement building at the ferry point, south of Ferry Road, was built from the wreck of HMS Impregnable which sunk in 1799. The current building to the north of ferry was originally where the boathouse stood. Members of the Spraggs family were licensees and owners from at least 1900 until after the mid-twentieth century and were responsible for the "Ferry" rebranding. The Spraggs were also responsible for operation of Hayling Ferry and there was an undoubtedly synergy between the two enterprises. The establishment is no longer a freehouse, having been sold to Stonegate Pub Company, and is variously branded "Ferryboat" both with and without a space.

=== Other places of interest ===
- Sinah Warren Holiday Camp
- Golf Club
- Second World War Pillbox and Gunnery Buildings

== Transport ==
The Hayling Ferry links to Portsmouth from the Ferry Point, and has been running for more than 200 years. In March 2015, the service shut down when the Hayling Island Ferry company went into administration after safety problems and repeated fines for carrying too many passengers at once. Service resumed in August 2016 after a fundraising effort which included a £5,000 donation from Richard Branson.

Bus services to the ferry ceased in 2004. Efforts to re-instate the service have taken place at various times.

In 2018, Havant Borough Council realised a long-held ambition for a connecting bus, coming up with £20,000 to fund a six-month trial of a Monday to Friday peak hour bus (numbered 149 – for nostalgic reasons – operated by Portsmouth City Coaches) to perform a circuit of Hayling Island before connecting to the ferry, while on the other side First Solent extended their route 15 from its Eastney terminus in Fort Cumberland Road about half a mile on to the turning circle close to the ferry's landing stage.
