= Mengham =

Village on Hayling Island, Hampshire, England

Coordinates: 50.78783°N 0.97144°W

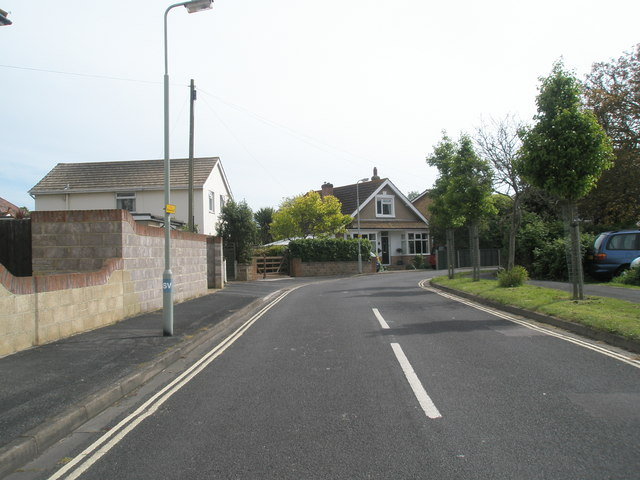
Mengham Avenue

Mengham is a settlement on Hayling Island in Hampshire, England. It is the largest shopping area on the island, and has three schools and a library. There is a church, St Mary's, in the north of the settlement.

There is said to be an entrance to a tunnel in St Mary's churchyard, disguised as a grave. This tunnel allegedly goes down to the shore and in past times smugglers used it to bring contraband items into the mainland. The tunnel, found under the name "Mary Gritt's" leads around 1/2 a mile underground.
