= Hayling Island =

Island in Hampshire, England

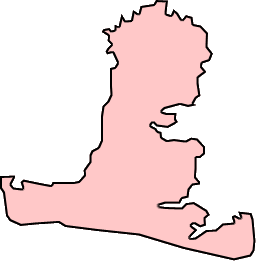
- The coastline of Hayling Island

- Location within Hampshire

Geography
- Location: Solent
- Coordinates: 50°48′10″N 0°58′30″W
- Total islands: 1
- Area: 30 km^{2} (12 sq mi)
- Length: 6.5 km (4.04 mi)
- Width: 6.5 km (4.04 mi)

Administration
- England
- County: Hampshire
- Borough: Havant
- Largest settlement: Mengham (town)

Demographics
- Population: 17,379 (2011)
- Pop. density: 562.9/km^{2} (1457.9/sq mi)

Hayling Island is an island off the south coast of England, in the borough of Havant in the county of Hampshire, east of Portsmouth.

== History ==
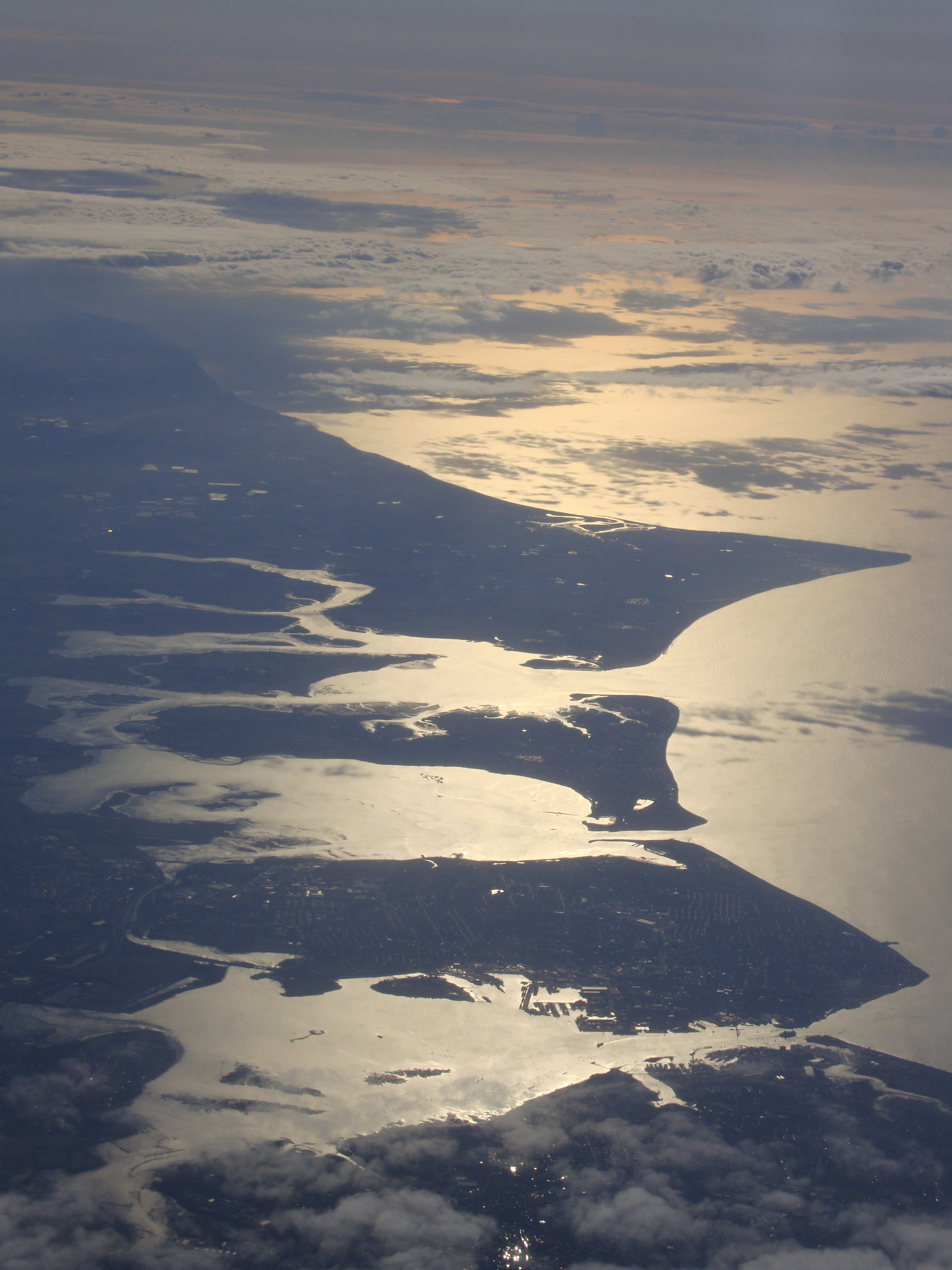
Hayling Island between Selsey Bill and Portsea Island, seen from the west, with north to the left

An Iron Age shrine in the north of Hayling Island, later developed into a Roman temple in the 1st century BC, was first recorded in Richard Scott's Topographical and Historical Account of Hayling Island (1826). The site was dug between 1897 and 1907 and again from 1976 to 1978. The remains are now buried under farmland. The first coin credited to Commius that was found in an archaeological dig was found at the temple. This Commius was probably the son of the Commius mentioned by Julius Caesar, although it is possible the coin was issued by the same Commius.

Salt production was an industry on the island from the 11th century, and the Domesday Book records a saltpan on the island. This industry continued until the late 19th century.

The monks of Jumièges Abbey, Normandy, began to build Northwode Chapel about 1140; this became the site of the present St Peter's Church, now the oldest surviving church on the island. St Peter's three bells, cast in about 1350, are one of the oldest peals in England. St Mary's Church is a standard design for the churches of its era, but the walls were built with a mortar of local shells and beach pebbles. The ancient yew tree in the churchyard is believed to be the oldest yew in the county, with a girth of some nine metres (30 feet). Estimates of its age range from over a thousand to nearly two thousand years old.

The grave of Princess Catherine Yurievskaya (1878–1959), a daughter of Alexander II of Russia, who lived in North Hayling for many years, is in St Peter's churchyard; and that of George Glas Sandeman, nephew of the founder of Sandeman Port and second head of that company, is prominent in the north-east part of St Mary's graveyard.

In May 1944, the island was the location of a mock invasion during the military Exercise Fabius, rehearsing the preparations for D-Day.

In 1982, the English Court of Appeal recognised prior art by Peter Chilvers, who in 1958 as a 12-year-old boy on Hayling Island assembled his first board combined with a sail. It had all the elements of the modern windsurfer. The court found that later innovations were "merely an obvious extension" and upheld the defendant's claim based on film footage. This court case set a significant precedent for patent law in the United Kingdom, in terms of Inventive step and non-obviousness. The case, Chilvers, Hayling, and a replica of Chilvers's original board were featured on an episode of the BBC's The One Show in 2009.

On 20 October 2013, at least one hundred properties on the island were damaged when it was hit by a tornado. No injuries were reported.

== Geography ==
Hayling Island is a true island, surrounded by water. Looking at its north-to-south orientation, it is shaped like an inverted T, about 6.5 km (4 miles) long and 6.5 km (4 miles) wide. A road bridge connects its northern end to the mainland of England at Langstone. The Hayling Ferry is a small pedestrian ferry connecting to the Eastney area of the city of Portsmouth on the neighbouring Portsea Island. To the west is Langstone Harbour and to the east is Chichester Harbour.

The natural beach at Hayling was predominantly sandy, but in recent years it has been mechanically topped with shingle dredged from the bed of the Solent in an effort to reduce beach erosion and reduce the potential to flood low-lying land. At low tide, the East Winner sandbank is visible, extending a mile out to sea. The coastline in this area has substantially changed since Roman times: it is believed much land has been lost from the coasts of Hayling and Selsey by erosion and subsequent flooding.

== Climate ==
As with the rest of the British Isles and Southern England, Hayling Island experiences a maritime climate with cool summers and mild winters. Temperatures have never fallen into double figures below freezing, illustrating the relative warmth of the island – comparable to the far southwest of England and its neighbour, the Isle of Wight. Temperature extremes between 1960 and 2010 have ranged from −9.4 °C (15.1 °F) during January 1963, up to 32.1 °C (89.8 °F) during June 1976.

Climate data for Hayling Island 4 m (13 ft) asl, 1991-2020, extremes 1960–2010
Month	Jan	Feb	Mar	Apr	May	Jun	Jul	Aug	Sep	Oct	Nov	Dec	Year
Record high °C (°F)	13.7 (56.7)	14.9 (58.8)	20.0 (68.0)	24.3 (75.7)	27.4 (81.3)	32.1 (89.8)	31.7 (89.1)	31.4 (88.5)	27.2 (81.0)	21.7 (71.1)	17.5 (63.5)	14.6 (58.3)	32.1 (89.8)
Mean daily maximum °C (°F)	8.4 (47.1)	8.6 (47.5)	10.7 (51.3)	13.5 (56.3)	16.7 (62.1)	19.5 (67.1)	21.6 (70.9)	21.4 (70.5)	19.1 (66.4)	15.5 (59.9)	11.6 (52.9)	9.1 (48.4)	14.6 (58.4)
Mean daily minimum °C (°F)	3.7 (38.7)	3.5 (38.3)	4.8 (40.6)	6.4 (43.5)	9.5 (49.1)	12.3 (54.1)	14.5 (58.1)	14.6 (58.3)	12.6 (54.7)	9.9 (49.8)	6.5 (43.7)	4.2 (39.6)	8.5 (47.4)
Record low °C (°F)	−9.4 (15.1)	−8.9 (16.0)	−5.6 (21.9)	−2 (28)	−0.6 (30.9)	2.2 (36.0)	7.8 (46.0)	7.2 (45.0)	4.2 (39.6)	−0.2 (31.6)	−4.6 (23.7)	−7.2 (19.0)	−9.4 (15.1)
Average precipitation mm (inches)	83.5 (3.29)	56.1 (2.21)	46.3 (1.82)	47.8 (1.88)	41.1 (1.62)	45.2 (1.78)	46.4 (1.83)	49.3 (1.94)	59.4 (2.34)	84.1 (3.31)	90.6 (3.57)	86.7 (3.41)	736.5 (29)
Average rainy days	12.6	10.1	8.5	8.5	7.6	7.1	7.2	7.7	7.8	11.2	13.1	12.3	113.7
Source 1: Royal Dutch Meteorological Institute/KNMI
Source 2: Meteoclimat

== Sport and leisure ==
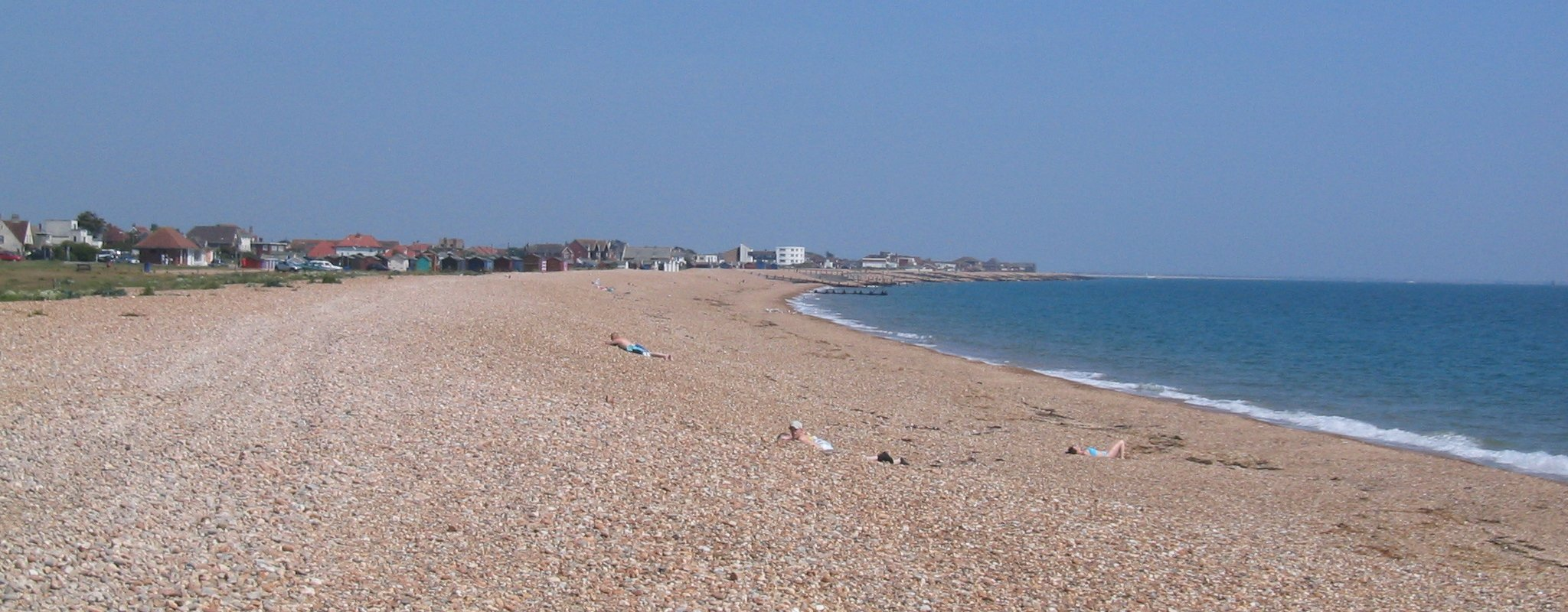
Beaches at Hayling Island

Hayling Island has a non-League football club, Hayling United F.C., which plays at Hayling Park.

Although largely residential, Hayling is also a holiday, windsurfing, Rowing and sailing centre, the site where windsurfing was invented.

The Island has three sailing clubs

- Mengeham Rythe Sailing Club on the Eastern side in Chichester Harbour
- Hayling Island Sailing Club on the Eastern side in Chichester Harbour
- Hayling Ferry Sailing Club on the western side in the entrance to Langstone Harbour
- Also Langstone Sailing Club is on the mainland

The largest of the clubs is Hayling Island Sailing Club which has benefitted from National Lottery funding and has hosted numerous World Championships including the:

- 420 World Championships
- 505 World Championship
- Contender World Championship
- Flying Fifteen World Championship
- Flying Dutchman World Championship
- ILCA 7 World Championship
- ILCA Masters World Championships
- ILCA Under 21 World Championships
- Moth World Championship
- RS Aero World Championships
- RS Feva World Championship
- Tornado World Championship
- Tasar World Championship

One of the most significant was ILCA 7 World Championship which was an Olympic level regatta won by Australian Tom Slingsby, whilst Dane Thorbjoern Schierup won the Junior competition. Today it is home to many different types of sailing, including a growing Fireball fleet.

Because of the island's popularity for water activities, there are two lifeboat services: Hayling Island Lifeboat Station, run by the RNLI, and Hayling Island Rescue Service, an independent service run by retired RNLI helmsman Frank Dunster.

The island hosts one of the few active Real Tennis courts in the UK. Founded in 1911, Seacourt Tennis club is one of only a handful in the UK where it is possible to play every recognised racquet sport. The racquets court itself was opened by Sir Colin Cowdrey.

Seacourt Tennis Club also hosts a weekly fencing club featuring all ages, levels and weapons.

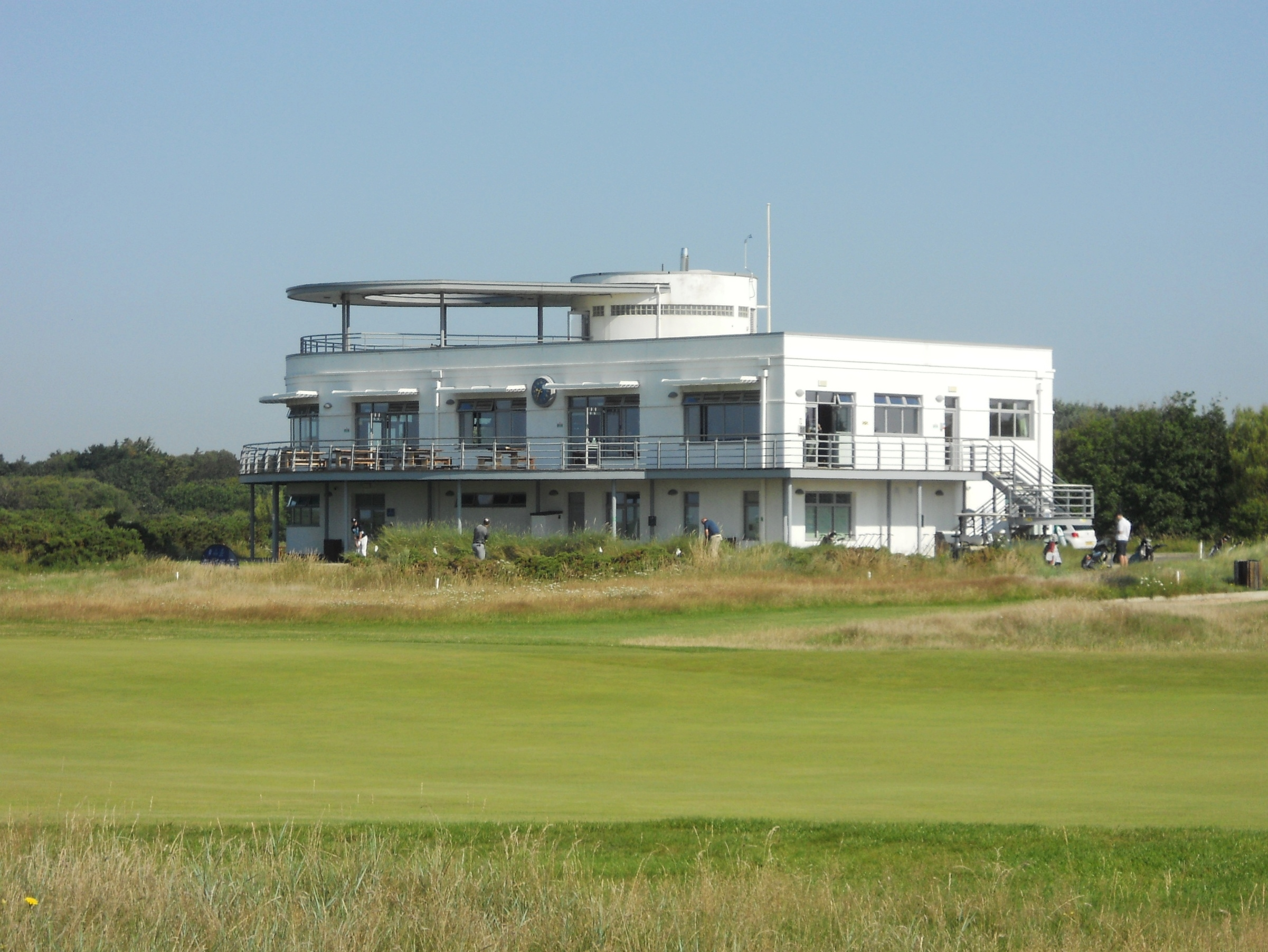
Hayling Golf Club clubhouse

Hayling Golf Club has been voted in the top 100 golf courses in the UK. A traditional links course, although relatively short by modern standards, the strong prevailing south-westerly winds, fast greens, gorse bushes and traditional deep links bunkers make this a stern test for any golfer.

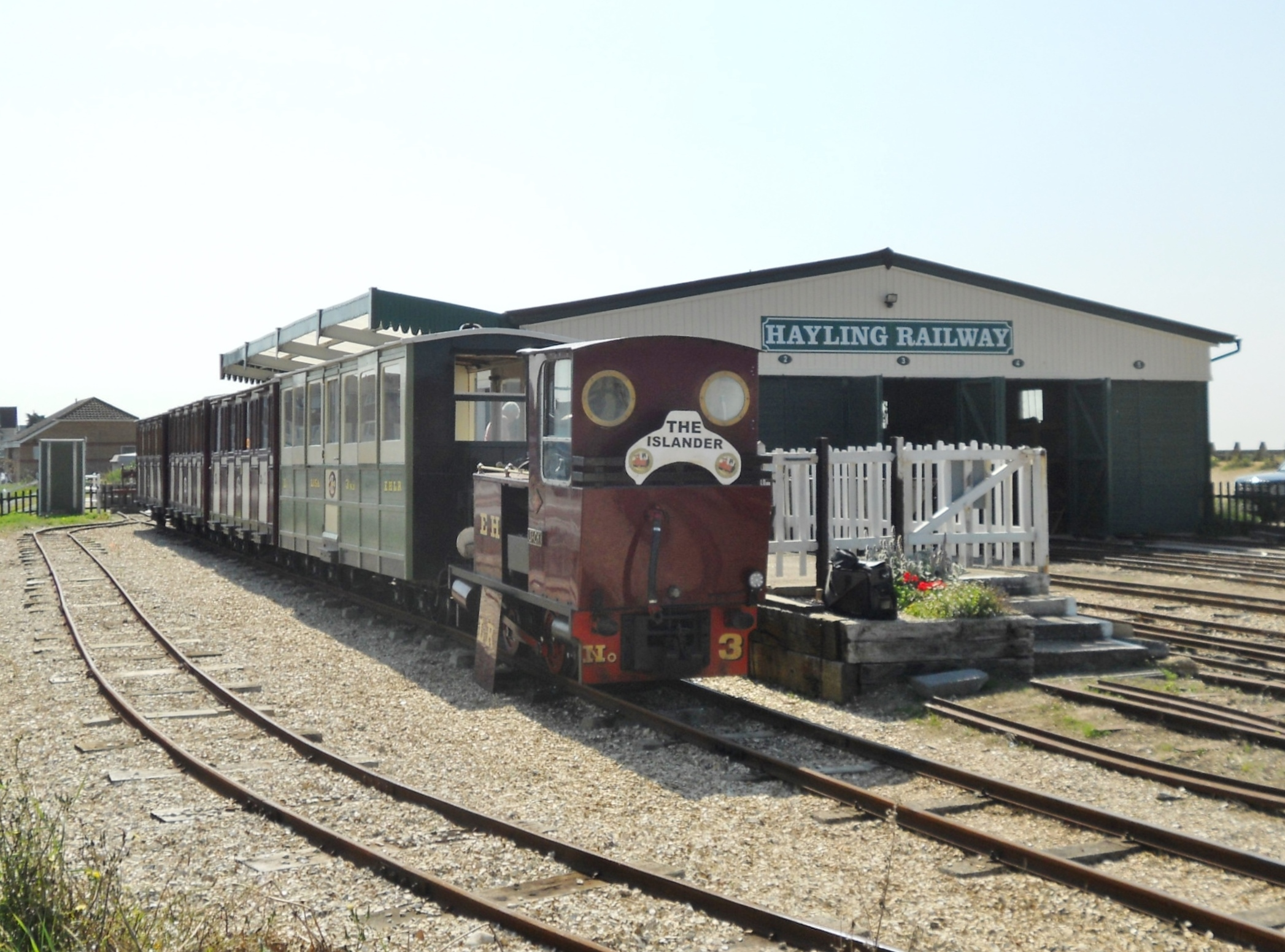
Hayling Seaside Railway

Funland, an amusement park situated at Beachlands, is open year-round, as is the Hayling Seaside Railway which runs from the funfair to Eastoke corner.

The 5-mile (8.0 km) Hayling Billy Trail is a former light rail right-of-way which has been converted to one of many footpaths on the island. The Ordnance Survey Explorer 120 map covers the area and the local tourist information office supplies leaflets of local interest walks.

The Station Theatre hosts a variety of plays staged by the Hayling Island Amateur Dramatics Society, Hayling Musical Society, musical events and films throughout the year.

The island has several churches of different denominations including three Anglican churches: St Peter's at Northney, St Mary's at Gable Head and the more recently built St Andrew's in South Hayling.

== Transport ==
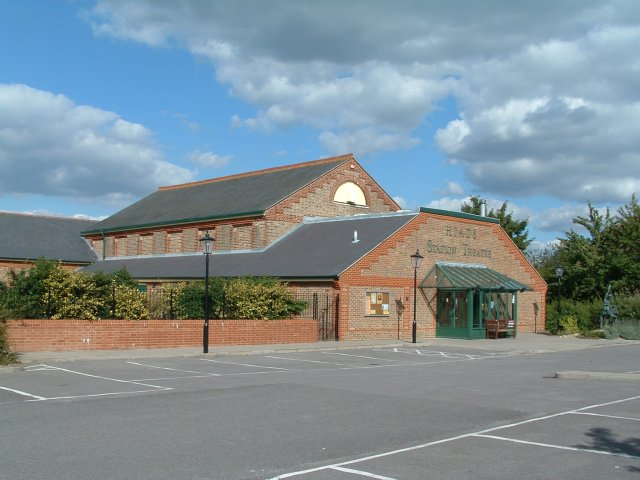
Station Theatre, West Town, Hayling Island

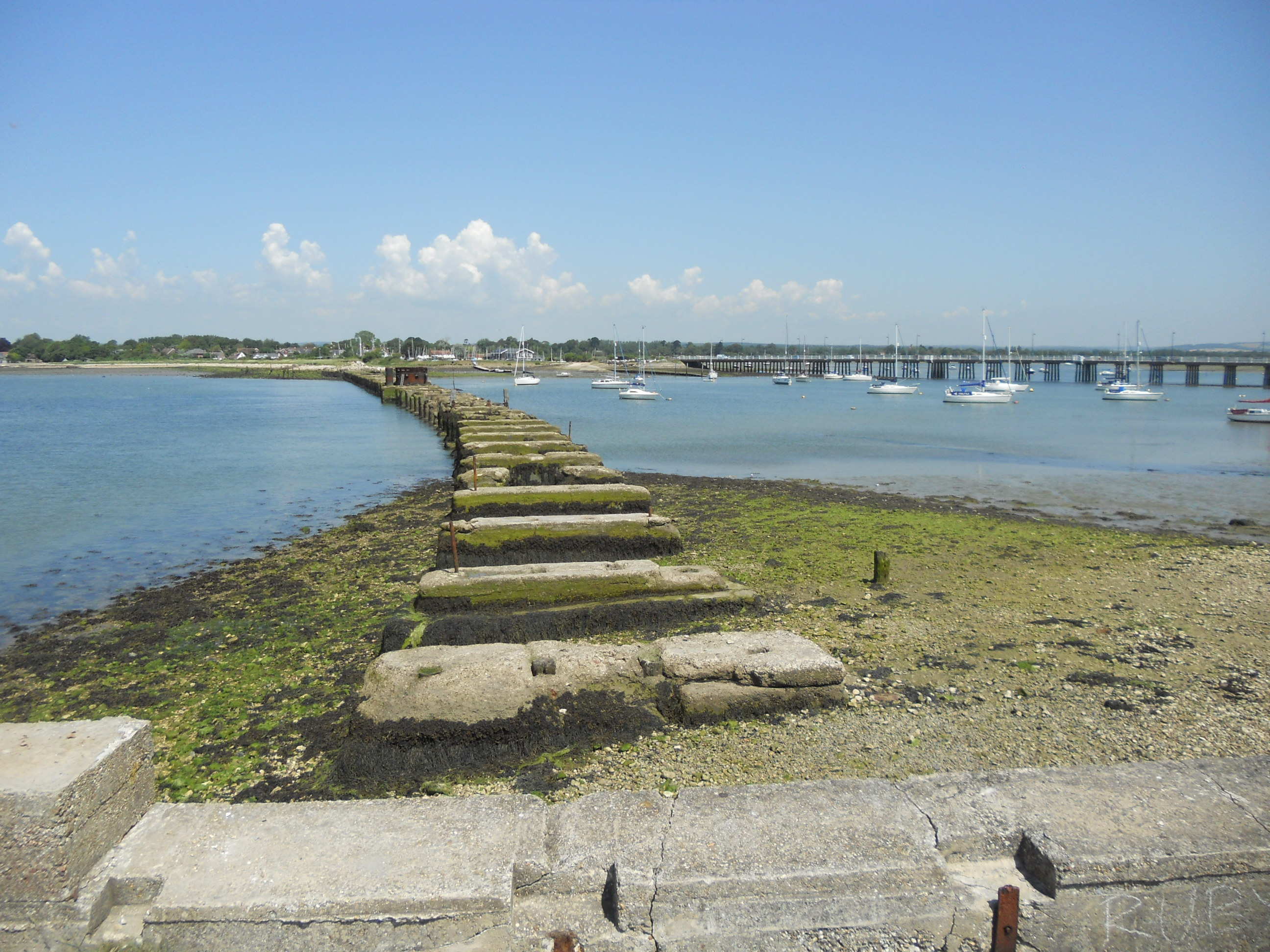
Remains of the old railway bridge linking Hayling Island to the mainland. The present road bridge can be seen to the right.

Hayling Ferry links Portsmouth and Hayling Island. The ferry is busy in summer in good weather, bringing tourists and cyclists to Hayling. In winter, there was a significant reduction of use. The ferry service to and from Portsea Island was subsidised by the local authorities, leaving it under constant threat of closure due to limited resources. The ferry service ceased when the company running the ferry went into administration in March 2015. It was reopened in August 2016 by Baker Trayte Marine Ltd.

During the ferry's closure, the only public connection between Hayling Island and the mainland was the single carriageway road linking Northney to Langstone Havant. In summer, in particular, this road can become very congested, rendering the journey between the bridge and South Hayling (the most populated area) anything from 30 minutes to an hour. A proposed Millennium project to create a new shared pedestrian and cycle bridge was unsuccessful.

A railway to the island was active in the 19th and 20th centuries. It opened on 17 July 1867, coinciding with the local races. Terrier steam locomotives pulled carriages along the 5-mile (8 km) Hayling Billy Line from Havant Station on the mainland to a station which was located at the northern end of Staunton Avenue, passing through Langstone where there was a Halt. The railway was popular with tourists throughout the summer, though it saw little service in winter, and at peak times ran up to 24 services per day. Despite its popularity, the line was marked for closure in the Beeching Report owing to the prohibitive cost of replacing Langstone Bridge, which connected the island to the mainland, estimated at up to £400,000 to repair. Services ended on 3 November 1963, and the bridge was demolished in 1966. The remaining railway buildings are a goods shed, which has now been converted into a theatre run by HIADS, and a station, opposite the Ship Inn over the bridge. A railway gatehouse, located opposite Mill Lane, was burned down on 15 November 2018; no other building is believed to survive.

A tourist attraction, the East Hayling Light Railway, is a 2 ft (610 mm) gauge railway which runs for just over 1 mile (1.6 km) from Beachlands Station to Eastoke Corner with aspirations to extend the route to Ferry Point within the next few years.

The nearest railway station to Hayling Island is Havant, just on to the mainland off Hayling Island. Alternatively, Portsmouth & Southsea is another railway station, used for connections to Bristol Temple Meads and Cardiff.

== Notable people ==
- Marjorie Bowen (1885–1952), writer, was born on Hayling Island. In her autobiography she wrote: "I was born in Hayling Island in the cottage of an old woman named Mrs. Cole, of whom I know nothing save that she made a quantity of sloe gin and hoarded it, leaving it to be drunk on the day of her funeral".
- Peter Chilvers, inventor of the windsurfer
- Stephanie Lawrence, "a musical actress of rare glamour", dancer and star of West End musicals such as Evita and Starlight Express, lived during her childhood on Hayling Island, where her parents ran Broadview House School on Beach Road.
- Gary Mehigan, chef and judge on MasterChef Australia, was born and raised on Hayling Island.
- Herbert Arnould Olivier, a portrait and landscape painter, and uncle of Laurence Olivier, died on Hayling Island in 1952.
- William Padwick (1791–1861), purchased the manor and large estates from the Duke of Norfolk inheriting title and rights of 'Lord of the Manor'. Considerable involvement in the developing transport links to the island.
- Nevil Shute (Nevil Shute Norway), the Ealing-born aeronautical engineer and novelist, lived at Pond Head on Hayling Island during World War II. His novels include A Town Like Alice and On the Beach.
- William Thomas Stead, notable political and social campaigner and journalist, had a home on Hayling Island – Hollybush House. He died with the sinking of the Titanic.
- Martin White (1779–1846), hydrologist responsible for maritime mapping of areas including Jersey, English Channel, Bristol Channel and Irish Sea
- Princess Catherine Yurievskaya, the youngest daughter of Alexander II of Russia, lived on Hayling Island for many years and was buried at St Peter's church in 1959.
- Maurice Wilks, automotive and aeronautical engineer, was born at Eastoke, Hayling Island on 19 August 1904. He became chairman of the Rover Car Company, and was involved in the development of the Land Rover. He also led Rover's involvement in the development of the jet engine during World War II.

== Hayling oysterbeds ==
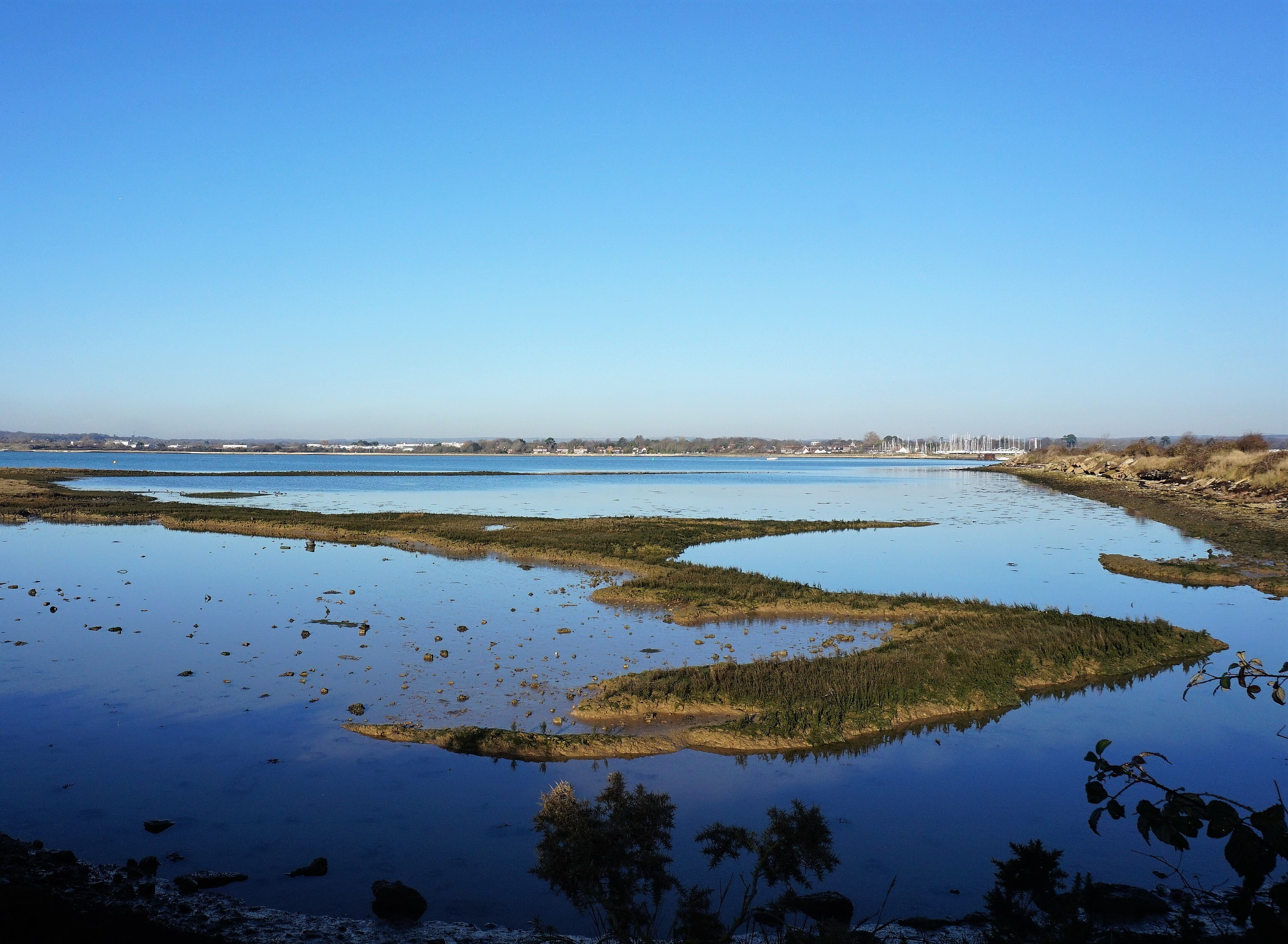
Oyster beds in Hayling Island

Oysters have been fished on the Hayling oysterbeds, at the northwest corner of the island, from as long ago as Roman times, documented in town records since 1615. The oysters were actively farmed between as early as 1819 until the 1970s. Oysters became a delicacy exported throughout the country under the classification of "Emsworth Oysters". Large complexes consisting of several pens separated by a series of bund walls and sluice gates were built to contain the oysters at varying stages of growth. Although large sections of the walls have since collapsed into the harbour, much of the shape and scale of the beds can still be seen.

In 1996, the oyster beds on the northwest coast of Hayling Island were restored by the Havant Borough Council, creating a wildlife haven which has become an important seabird breeding site. The Design Council awarded this project 'Millennium Product' status for the renovation.

== Twinning ==
Hayling Island started twinning with Gorron, France, in 1997, after many years of social exchanges between the two communities rather than the normal council-led route. Charters were signed and exchanged in 1998 and are now displayed in the library in Elm Grove. In recognition of the twinning Gorron appears on the welcome signs, there is also a 'twinning' tree outside the library and a Gorron roundabout at Beachlands. Gorron has similar recognitions including the 'Rue de Hayling Island' – previously Rue Victor Hugo.

== Paris to Hayling cycle ride ==
The island is the home of the Hayling Charity Cycle Ride which organises an annual charity cycle ride most often from Hayling Island to Paris and back. The event is commonly referred to as the "Paris To Hayling" This event, run entirely by local unpaid volunteers, was started in 1986 by local cyclist Peter McQuade MBE and has been run every year since. Up to 2024 over £1,900,000 had been collected for more than 500 good causes. Entrants have come from 15 different countries on five continents. Based on their research the organisers believe it may be the oldest long distance charity ride in the world.

== Population ==
In the mid- to late 20th century, Hayling Island's population was known to double during the summer months, due to a large influx of holiday makers and the associated tourism employees to accommodate. As domestic holidays have declined and Hayling's prominence as a traditional English seaside resort have followed in parallel, the population only swells by approximately 20%–25% (English Tourist Board estimate, 2001).

Population	Date
~300	1086 (Domesday Book)
578	1801 (census)
>1,600	1901
>5,500	1950
16,887	2001 (census, usually resident population)
17,379	2011 (census)

== List of settlements ==
- Mengham
- Northney
- Eastoke
- West Town
- Sinah
- Sandy Point
- South Hayling
- Gable Head
- Ferry Point
- Mill Rythe
- Tournerbury
- Stoke
- Tye

The island's place-names are discussed in an online work by Richard Coates (2007).

== Places of interest ==
- East Hayling Light Railway
- Funland
- Ham Field
- Hayling Billy Trail
- Hayling Island Sailing Club, Sandy Point (AKA Black Point)
- Northney Marina
- Seacourt Tennis Club
- Sparkes Marina
- Station Theatre
- St Mary's Church, Gable Head
- St Peter's Church, Northney
- The Hayling Ferry (Ferry reopened August 2016 after a year out of service)
- The Kench, near Ferry Point
- The RNLI Lifeboat station at Sandy Point

== See also ==
- List of places of worship in the Borough of Havant
