= Station Theatre (Hayling Island) =

Theatre in Hampshire, England

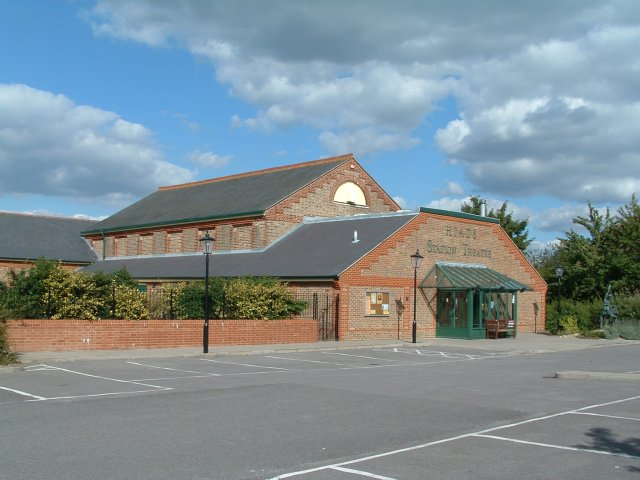
Station Theatre

The Station Theatre is a small amateur dramatics theatre located in the village of West Town, Hayling Island, Hampshire, England which is run for the people of Hayling Island and surrounding areas.

The theatre was converted from the derelict railway goods shed into a 144-seat theatre by Hayling Island Amateur Dramatic Society (HIADS). The theatre is run entirely by volunteer members from the non-profit making Hayling Island Amateur Dramatic Society who put on around six shows a year, including a pantomime, and one show performed by HIYA an affiliated group of young actors.

The theatre also hosts both professional and amateur visiting groups from on and off the island. The Station Theatre is equipped with modern lighting and sound systems, has stepped seating for 144, a licensed bar, a coffee bar, wheelchair access, hearing loop and free car parking.
