= Eastney =

Suburb of Portsmouth, Hampshire, England

Coordinates: 50°47′00″N 1°03′00″W

- Location within Hampshire
- Population: 13,591
- OS grid reference: SZ 66964 98688
- Unitary authority: Portsmouth
- Ceremonial county: Hampshire
- Region: South East
- Country: England
- Sovereign state: United Kingdom
- Post town: SOUTHSEA
- Postcode district: PO4
- Dialling code: 023
- Police: Hampshire and Isle of Wight
- Fire: Hampshire and Isle of Wight
- Ambulance: South Central
- UK Parliament: Portsmouth South

Eastney is a district in the south-east corner of Portsmouth, England, on Portsea Island. Its electoral ward is called Eastney and Craneswater. At the 2011 Census the population of this ward was 13,591.

== History ==
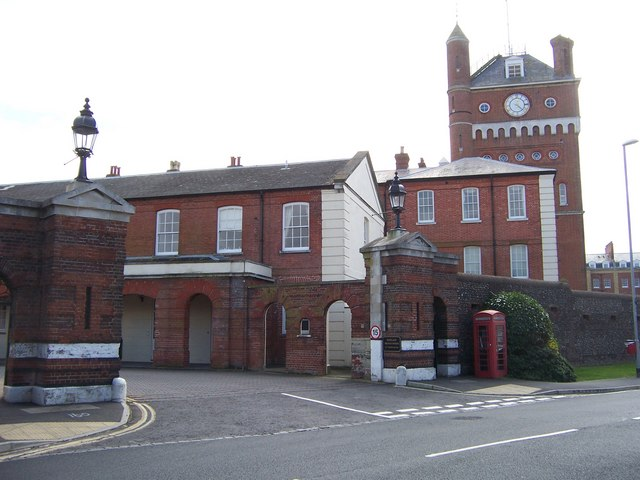
Main gate, Eastney Barracks

=== Barracks and fortifications ===
Eastney Barracks were built as headquarters for the Royal Marine Artillery, who moved in during 1867. At the same time as the barracks, a pair of small artillery forts were built on the foreshore. Eastney Fort East is still extant (having remained in military use until 1989); Eastney Fort West has been converted into a walled garden.

The small hamlet of Eastney and surrounding farmland were developed and absorbed into Portsmouth in the period 1890–1905, with a network of streets built to house Royal Marines and their families that spread west from the barracks site. The streets were mostly named after famous military and naval engagements in which the Royal Marines had taken part.

Due to the heavy bombing suffered in The Portsmouth Blitz during the Second World War, many displaced people found refuge along the north shore of Eastney Lake, living in makeshift houseboats, converted railway carriages, and fisherman huts. Many of these homes lacked the basic amenities of electricity and plumbed water supplies. The community survived into the mid and late 1960s when the city council began to relocate families to its newly built housing estates in Leigh Park and Paulsgrove.

=== Claims to fame ===
Eastney was the first venue for an underwater hockey game called Octopush, invented by Alan Blake of the newly formed Southsea Sub-Aqua Club.

Fraser Range, a (then) Royal Navy gunnery range establishment in Eastney, was used in October 1971 as a filming location for The Sea Devils, a serial of Doctor Who broadcast between 26 February and 1 April 1972. In late 2017, the Fraser Range site was purchased by National Regional Property Group, who have plans to preserve its naval heritage and to also develop the site for future residential use.

== Today ==
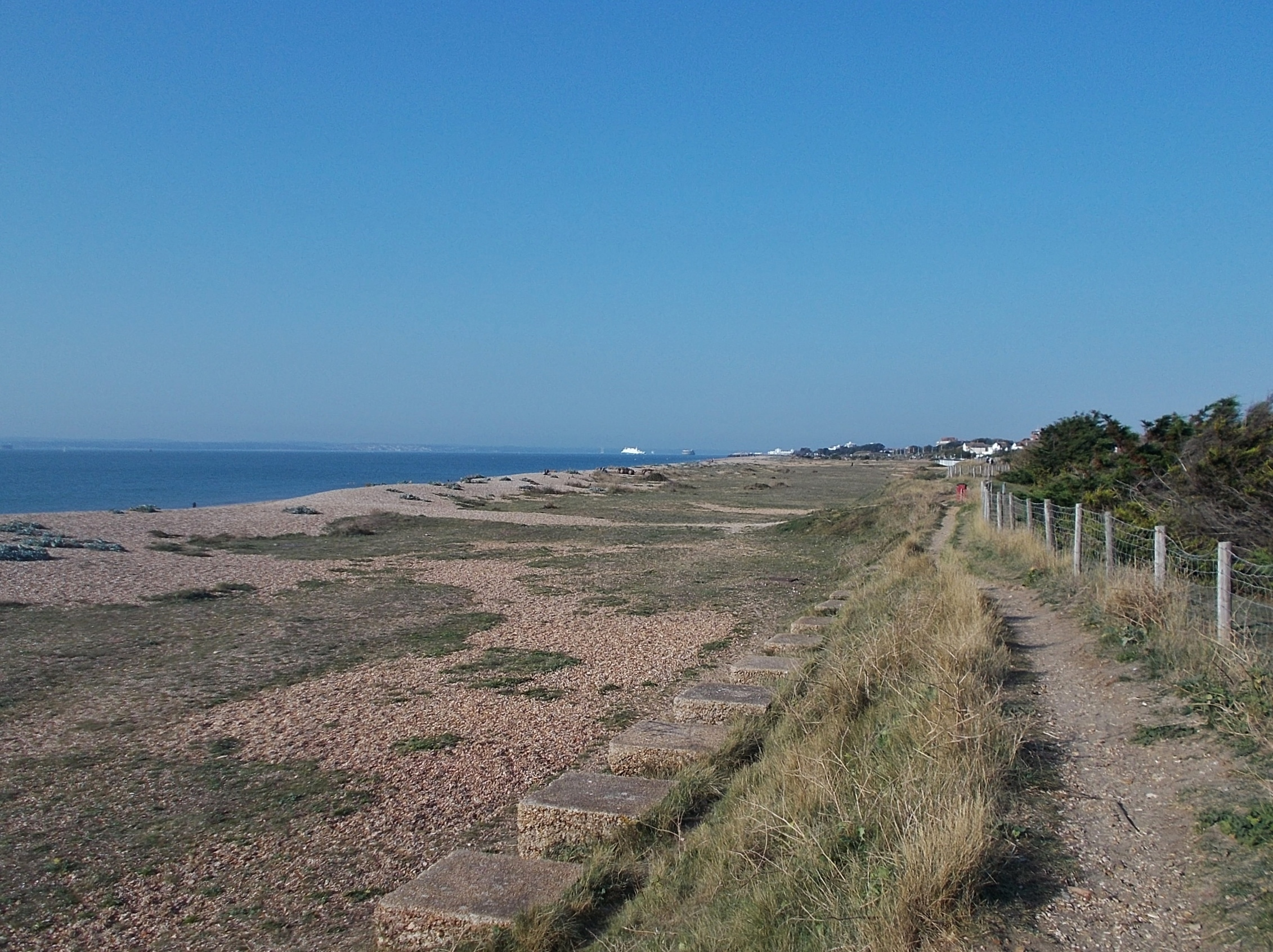
Eastney Beach

The area is home to Eastney Beam Engine House, as well as a council swimming pool, a camping and caravan site, and an estate of homes occupied by personnel of the UK Armed Forces and their families.

Eastney is also home to an unofficial naturist beach, which may be under threat from property development.

The University of Portsmouth's Marine Science department is along Ferry Road.

Southsea Marina, Fort Cumberland, and a nature reserve are also in the district.

Eastney Lake, also known by locals as 'Eastney Creek' or 'The Creek', is a natural tidal inlet of Langstone Harbour and is located on the northern side of the Eastney peninsular, with Milton on the northern side. A small enclosed lagoon nicknamed 'The Glory Hole' is located on the southern shore of Eastney Lake, and is refilled with Langstone Harbour's salt-water on high spring tides.

== Transport ==
The Hayling Ferry runs from Eastney, linking it to Ferry Point on Hayling Island.

== Churches ==
St Margaret of Scotland CofE church was built on Highland Road between 1902 and 1903. It was expanded between 1908 and 1910. It closed in 2017. Another church former church named St Patrick was built in 1906.
