= Sandeman =

Sandeman is a surname. Notable people with the surname include:

- Albert George Sandeman (1833–1923), British wine importer and governor of the Bank of England
- Bill Sandeman (born 1942), American football offensive tackle in the NFL
- Bradley Sandeman (born 1970), former English footballer
- David Sandeman (1757–1835) founder of Sandeman wines and the Commercial Bank of Scotland
- George Sandeman (born 1883), English cricketer
- Gillian Sandeman, former Canadian politician
- John Sandeman Allen (Liverpool West Derby MP) (1865–1935), British Conservative Party politician
- John Sandeman Allen (Birkenhead West MP) (1892–1949), British Conservative Party politician
- Laura Sandeman (1862–1929), Scottish doctor and activist
- Margot Sandeman (1922–2009), Scottish painter
- Mary "Aneka" Sandeman (born 1954), Scottish singer
- Robert Groves Sandeman, KCSI (1835–1892), Colonial British Indian officer and administrator
- Robert Sandeman (theologian) (born 1718), nonconformist theologian
- Nairne Stewart Sandeman, 1st Baronet, Conservative Party politician in the United Kingdom
- Toby Sandeman (born 1988), English fashion model and sprint athlete, specialising in the 200 metres
- William Sandeman (1722–1790), Perthshire (Scotland) linen manufacturer

Other uses:

- Sandeman (wine)
