= Northney =

Village and parish on Hayling Island, Hampshire, England

Coordinates: 50.8286°N 0.9636°W

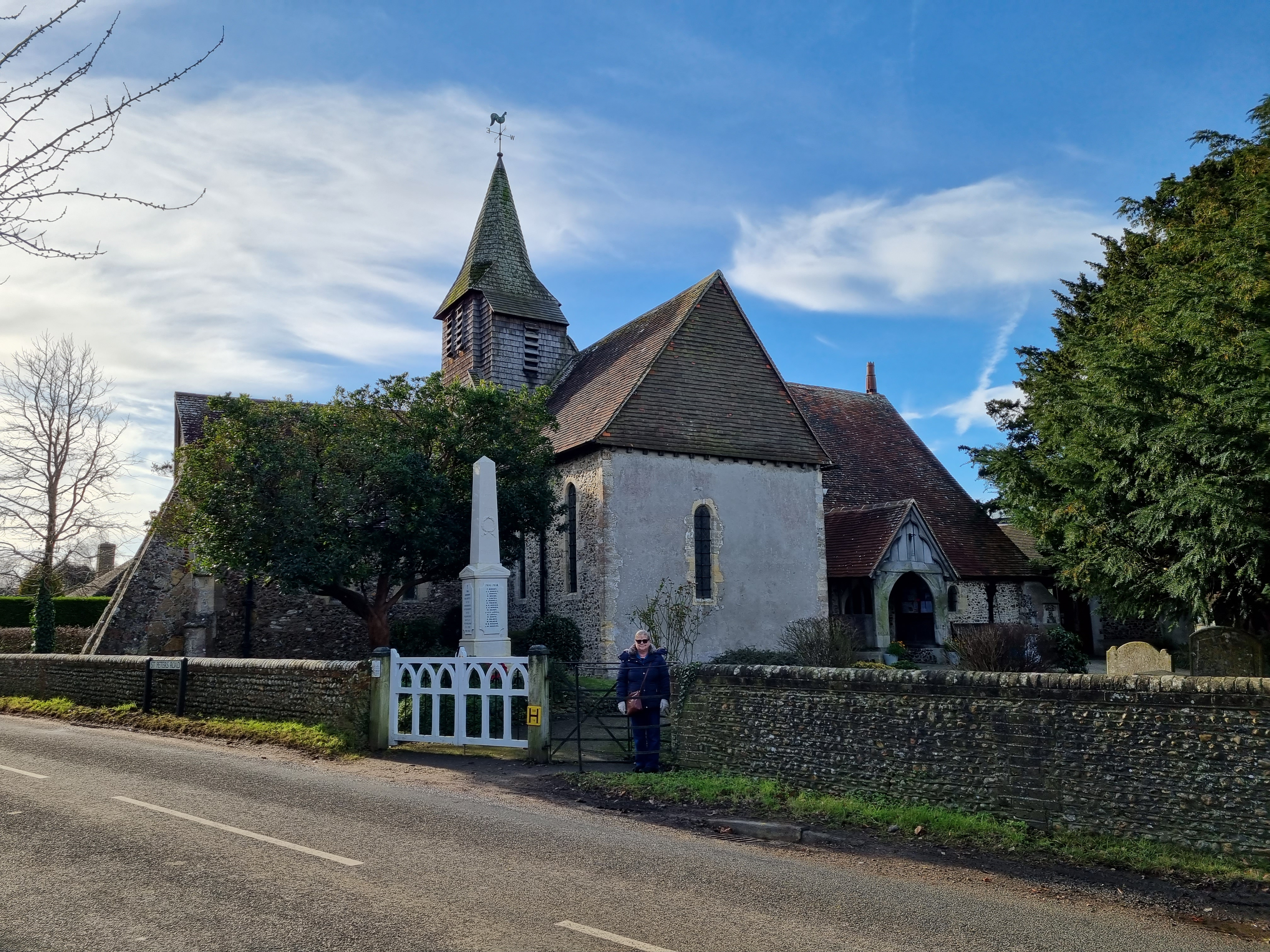
St Peter's church and war memorial, seen from St Peter's Road in Northney

Northney is a village on north Hayling island in the borough of Havant in the county of Hampshire, England. It is on the north coast of the island, east of where the A3023 meets the shore of the island and north of North Hayling. Hayling Island marina is nearby.

== History ==
The local parish church, St Peter's is a mid 12th century Norman church. After the Norman Conquest, the lands and properties of North Hayling were feued from the Bishop of Winchester to Jumièges Abbey in Normandy. By 1140, the abbey had paid for St Peter's church to be built for the local community. The church has three bells, cast around 1350.

Princess Catherine Yurievskaya (1878-1959), a daughter of Alexander II of Russia, is buried in the graveyard of St Peter's.

In 1694, it was reported that 30 villagers subscribed three guineas each to fight France in the Nine Years' War.

North Hayling railway station was a railway station to the west of the village that opened in 1867 and closed in 1963.

=== HMS Northney ===
HMS Northney (HMS Northney I, HMS Northney II, HMS Northney III and HMS Northnney IV) was a Royal Navy landing craft training base to the north of the village (Northney I was near the present-day marina). Northney I and Northney II were holiday camps requisitioned for use by the war department.

Northney
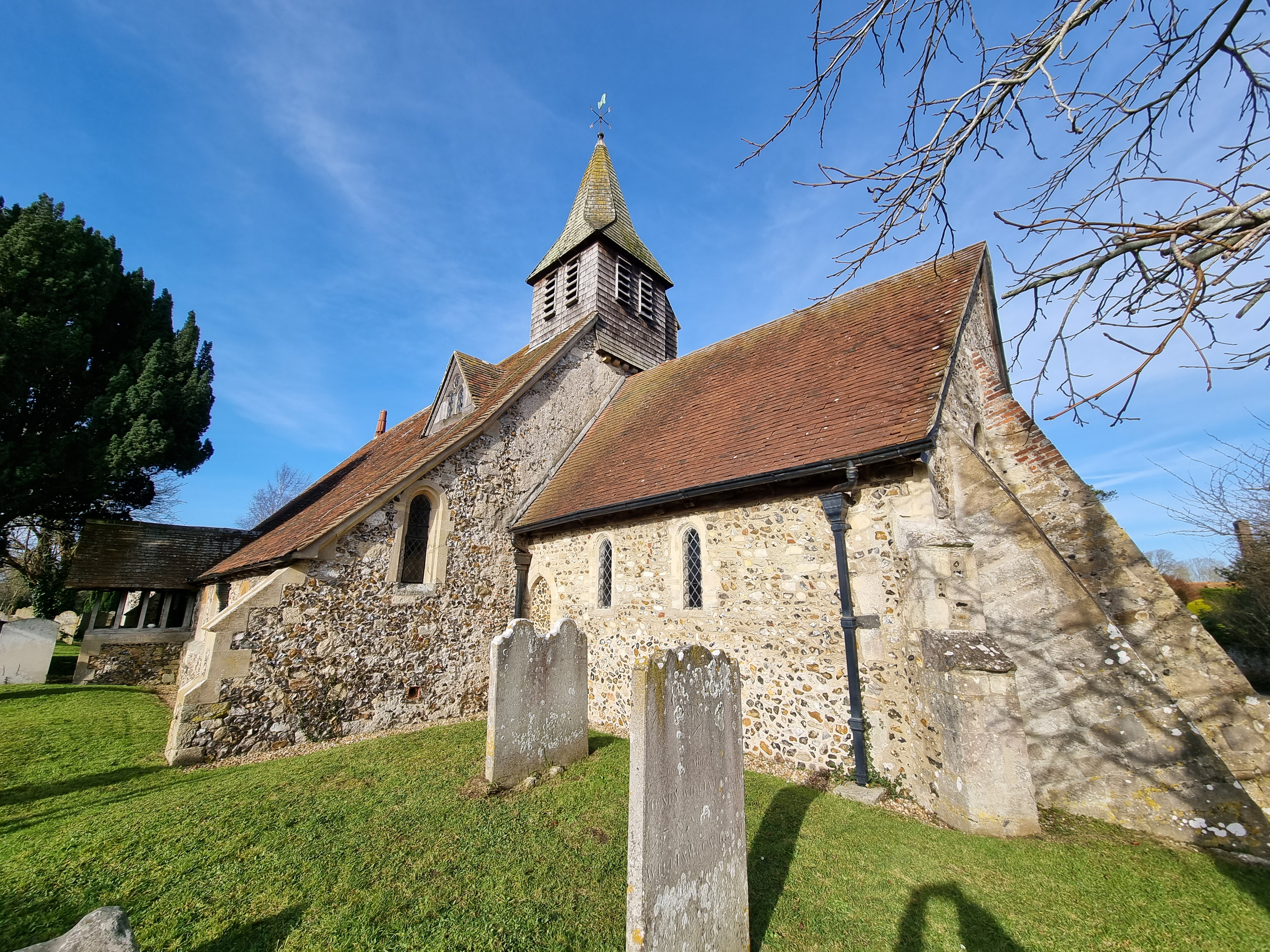
St Peter's Church seen from the south-west

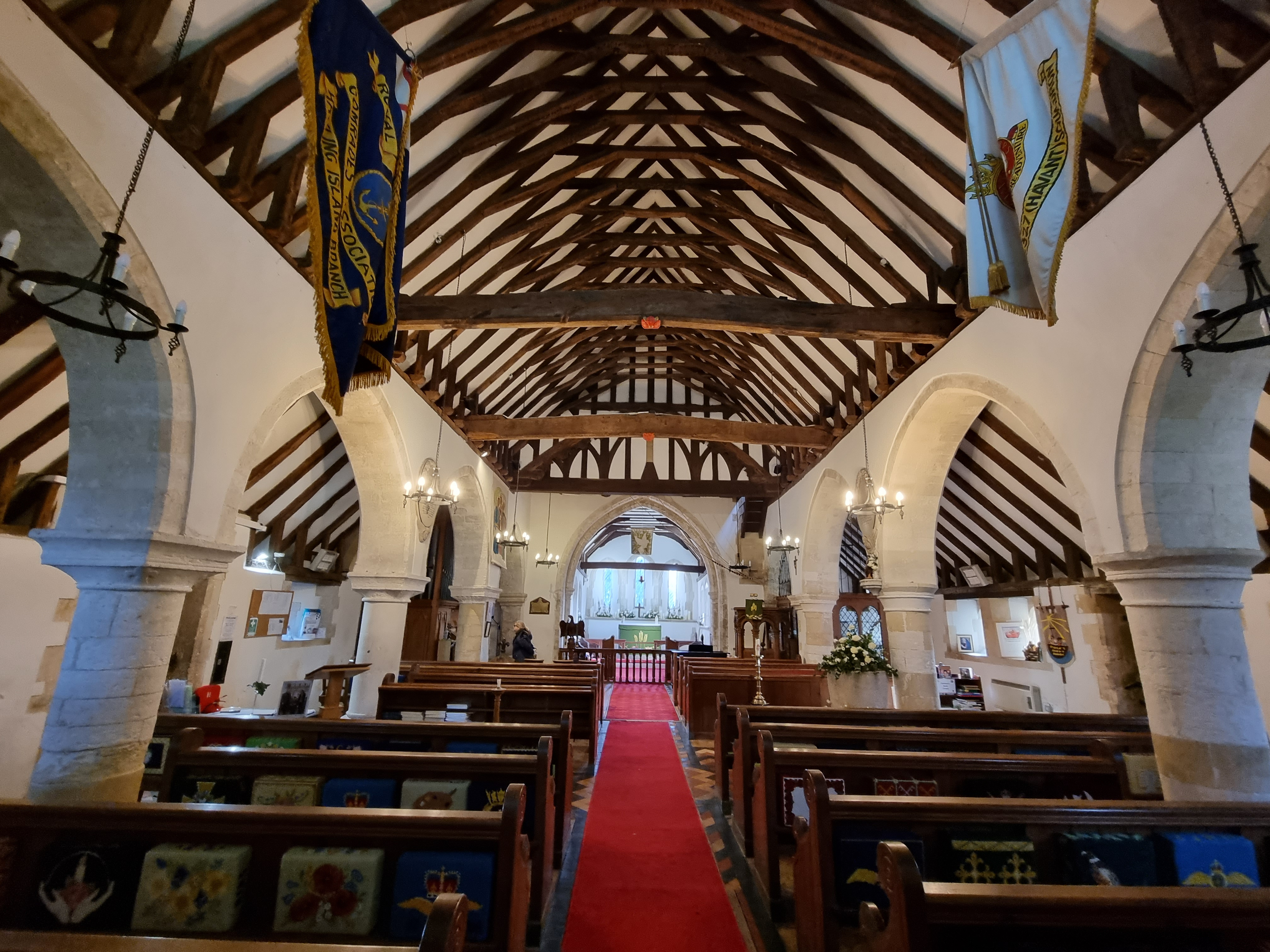
The interior of St Peter's Church

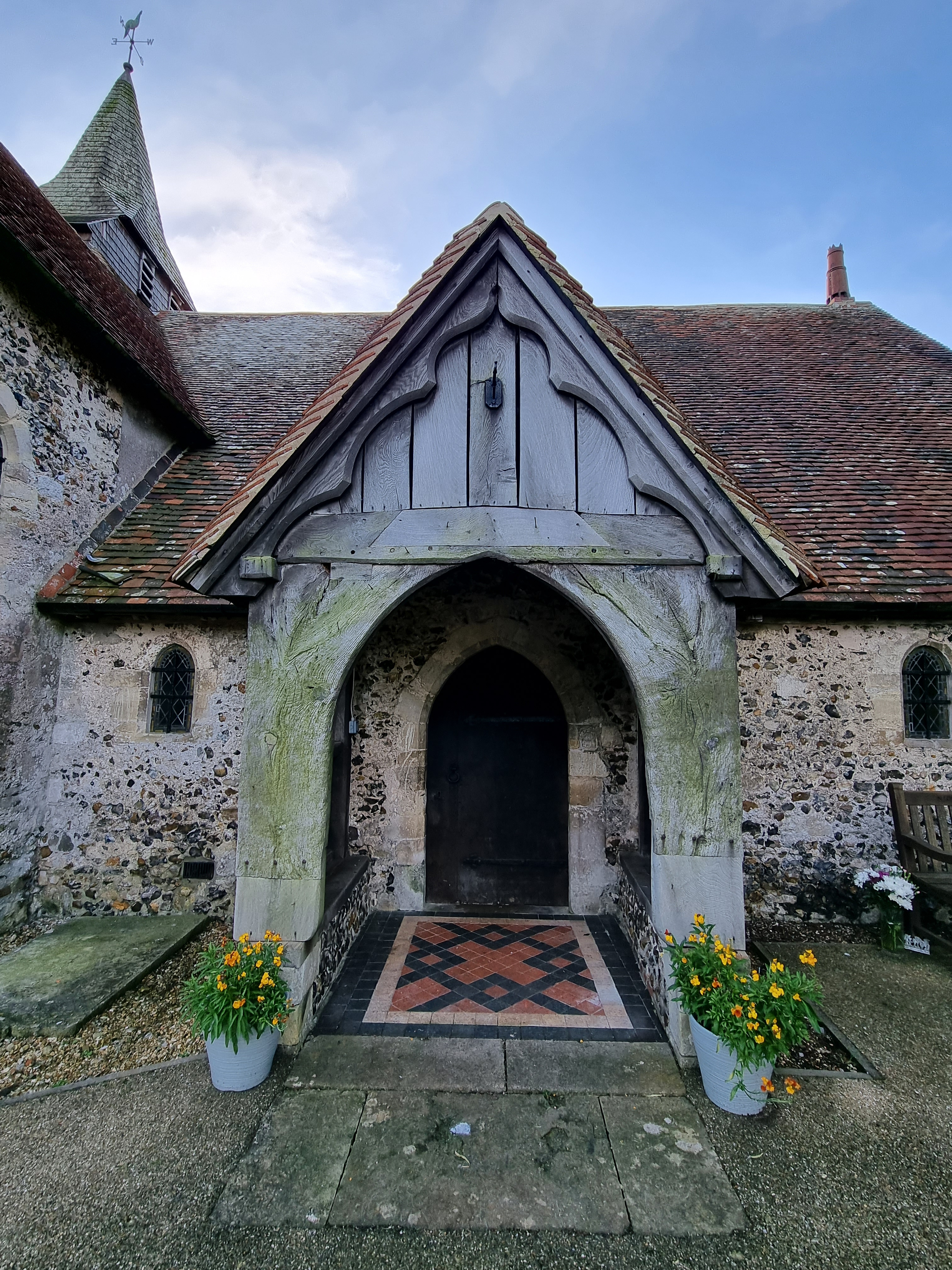
The entrance to the church

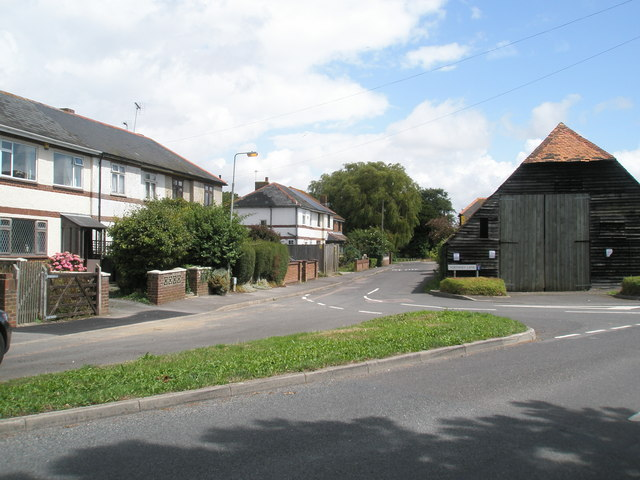
The Junction of Northney Road and Northney Lane

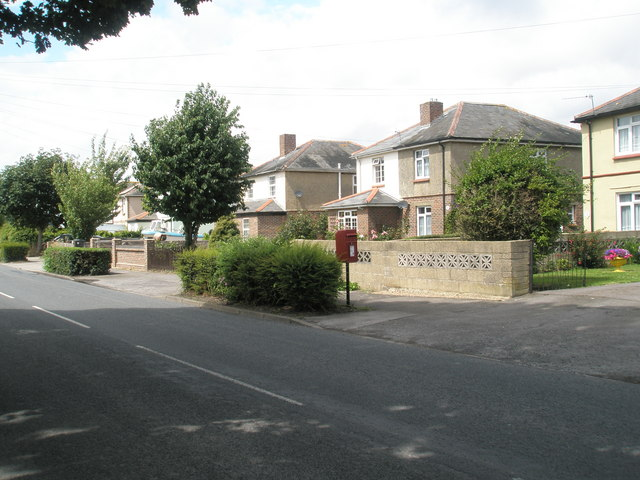
Postbox on Northney Road
