= Mill Rythe =

Holiday camp on Hayling Island, England

Mill Rythe Holiday Village
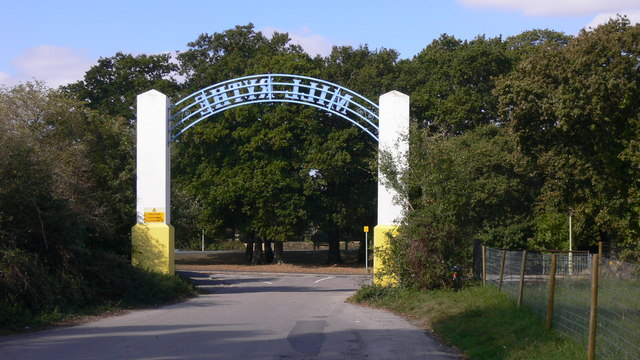
- Mill Rythe exit
- Interactive map of Mill Rythe Holiday Village
- Location: Hayling Island, Hampshire, UK
- Coordinates: 50.800581°N 0.9741163°W
- Subsequent names: The Sunshine Holiday Camp (1938–1985); Mill Rythe Holiday Village (since 1986)
- Facilities: Bowling green, swimming pool
- Established: 1938

Mill Rythe Holiday Village is a holiday camp in Hayling Island, Hampshire, England. Originally called Sunshine Holiday Camp, it opened its doors to the public in the early 1940s and had also been used by the Royal Marines during the war and for holidays with their families after World War II.

Sunshine Holiday Camp was owned by a local management team, Freshfields and was eventually bought out by Pontins in the 1960s. It was later bought by Warner in the 1980s and became known as Mill Rythe Holiday Village. After a few years, Warner decided to merge with Haven with the ownership of Mill Rythe Holiday Village. During the 1990s the ownership of the holiday camp changed a few times. It was close to administration and closing down in 2008.

In September 2010, newly formed holiday park operator, Away Resorts bought the park.

== Mill Rythe history ==
The Sunshine Camp was originally a farmhouse, Hudson’s, with some land and modest surroundings. Building of the holiday camp started in 1938 but was not finished due to the outbreak of World War II and holidays were put on hold.

Hayling Island played a major role in many aspects of the Allied war effort during WWII and had been in the forefront of the pre-war holiday camp boom and created ideal accommodation for the many thousands of service personnel drafted in to train on the island.

Sunshine Holiday Camp was taken over by the Royal Marines and was the location of HMS Northney, a dockyard facility for landing craft repair and maintenance. Hayling Island was chosen as the location for D-Day rehearsal Fabius 2 to prepare for the Normandy landings and the invasion of mainland Europe.

From the end of the war, through the 1950s and into the early 1960s the holiday camp industry thrived and Hayling Island became a popular destination for holidaymakers. The camp was eventually bought out by Pontins in the 1960s from local management operator Freshfields.

However, by the 1970s the popularity of holiday camps began to decline as people began to holiday abroad taking advantage of new, cheap package holidays. The holiday camp was eventually bought by Warner in the 1980s and changed the name of the camp from Sunshine Holiday Camp to Mill Rythe Holiday Village.

After a few years, Warner merged with Haven and became part of Rank Group Holidays Division. In the 1990s and after nearly a decade of ownership, the village changed hands a few times to minor companies and was close to going into administration in 2008.

In September 2010, Mill Rythe was bought by holiday park operator Away Resorts. Since the acquisition, Away Resorts has invested over £2.5 million into the holiday camp with continuous plans for further renovations and improvements.

== Entertainment ==
Mill Rythe hosts a variety of entertainment weekends with breaks targeted at both adults and families. The facilities include a ballroom, indoor swimming pool, bar "The missing Squirrel" and a restaurant "The Green Room".

== Influence ==
In 1977, Mill Rythe was the setting for the British comedy film Confessions from a Holiday Camp starring Robin Askwith and directed by Norman Cohen. The popular BBC sitcom Hi-de-Hi! used Mill Rythe for establishing shots and other exterior scenes.

More recently, BBC soap opera EastEnders shot scenes at the holiday village in 2014.

== Bibliography ==
- Roebuck, Janet (1982). The Making of Modern English Society from 1850. Routledge. ISBN 978-0-7100-0415-4.
- Ward, Colin; Hardy, Dennis (1987). Goodnight Campers!: The History of the British Holiday Camp. Taylor & Francis. ISBN 978-0-7201-1835-3.
