= William Padwick =

- Born: 12 May 1791
- Died: 10 September 1861 (aged 70)
- Other names: William Padwick the younger
- Occupation(s): Lord of the Manor, lawyer and entrepreneur
- Known for: Development of Hayling Island

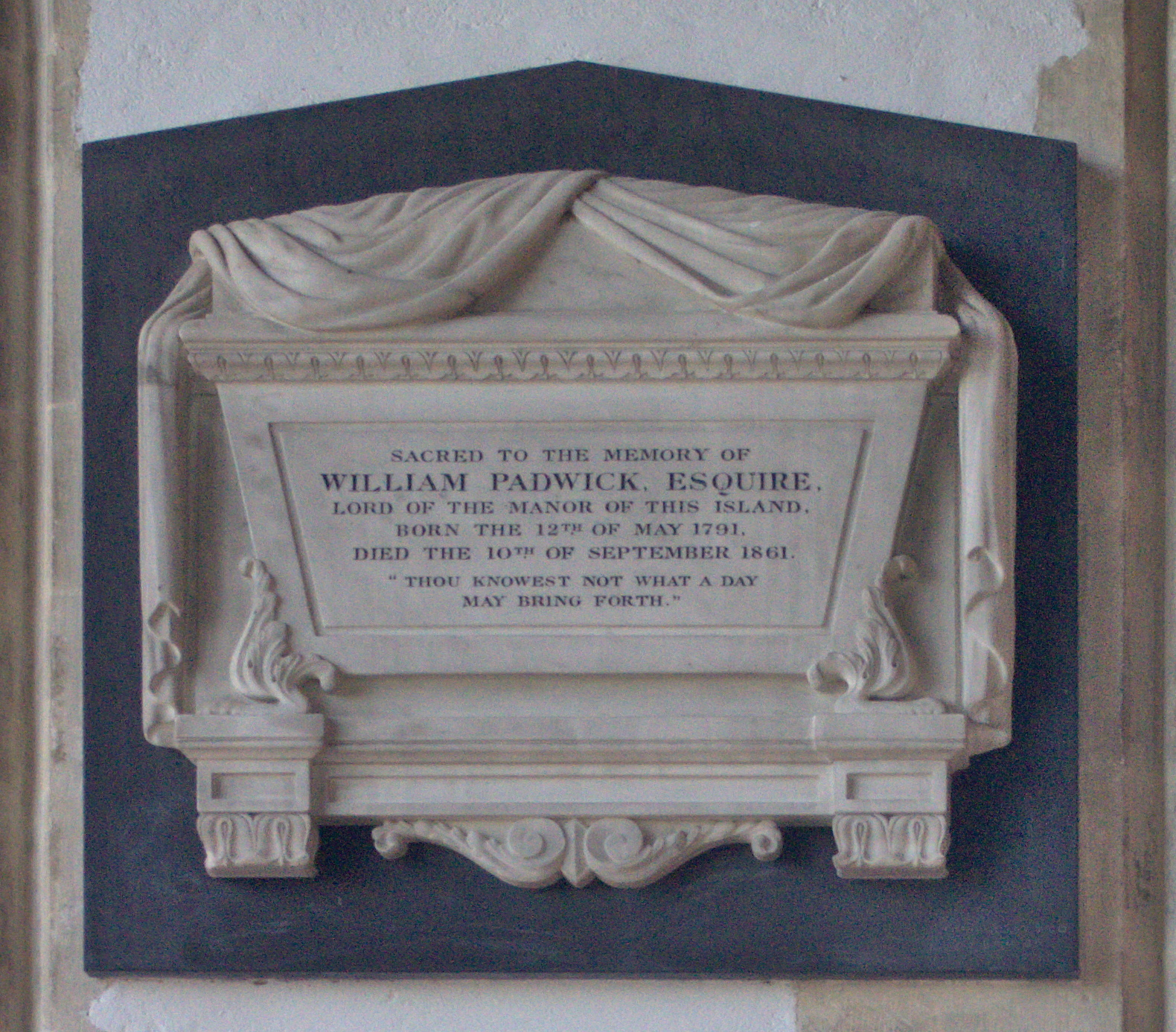
Wall-mounted monument to William Padwick in St Mary's parish church, Hayling Island

William Padwick, sometimes known as William Padwick the younger, was a significant figure in the development of Hayling Island in the mid-nineteenth century.

By 1812 he had established himself as a lawyer.

In 1814 he married Grace Taylor, the daughter of William Taylor, an admiral in the Royal Navy.

Moving to Warblington House, he drove the enterprise to create the first Langstone Bridge, a toll bridge that opened in 1824.

In 1825 he bought South Hayling Manor from Bernard Howard, 12th Duke of Norfolk. This also included Manor Farm, Sinah Farm and South Common. As Lord of the manor this came with various royalties, tithes, ferry rights and mud rights, and was noted for enforcement particular in respect of the Oyster fisheries.

Famed for his desire to develop and promote Hayling Island as a tourist destination, his aspirations led to early development of West Town. He engaged a London architect to develop 'Beachlands' with the 'Norfolk Hotel', a crescent, bath house and horse racing track. The golf course on Sinah Common was another amenity he created.

He was also heavily involved in the failed attempt to run a railway over mud flats in Langstone Harbour, creating wet and dry docks at Sinah Lake.

William Padwick died in 1861.
