= Peter Chilvers =

Peter Chilvers was an English inventor, engineer and promoter of sailing and windsurfing. He is credited with an early version of a sail powered surfboard. He died from lung cancer on 26 February 2015.

== Life ==
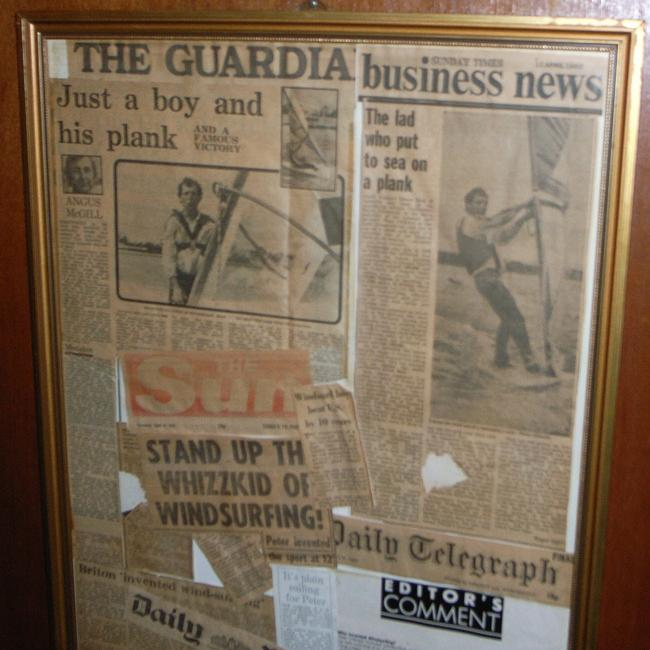
Collected press cuttings of Peter Chilvers

Chilvers had been an engineer for Lotus and founded a sailing and windsurfing centre in London. Chilvers is credited with creating a crude sailing craft propelled by a free-sail system while living on Hayling Island in 1958. His craft was recognized as prior art in later court cases in England regarding sailboard patents and royalties.

The windsurfing centre in London's East End was founded by Chilvers as a philanthropic venture to promote sailing and windsurfing amongst underprivileged children of the East End in the 1970s. Peter was certainly still running the sailing centre together with a bar on a Dutch sailing barge at Royal Victoria Dock into the 2000s. He also used to park his very distinctive prototype short wheelbase blue Lotus Esprit outside.

Chilvers headed the bid for a £40 million sailing and windsurfing centre on Hayling Island to regenerate the area and recognise it as the place where Windsurfing was invented and where he grew up.

== Claim of previous invention in windsurfing patent case ==
Chilvers came into the public eye in the 1980s as the result of patent infringement lawsuit brought by Windsurfing International, Inc. against Tabur Marine, a competing manufacturer. Tabur disputed the validity of the patent, and presented to the courts evidence of a creation by Chilvers, who, as a twelve-year-old in 1958, on Hayling Island, assembled a board powered by a freesail system ten years before Windsurfing International filed for its patent for the Windsurfer. Although the Chilvers Sailboard differed in some respects from the Windsurfer it had all the elements of a modern Windsurfer. The court ruled for Tabur. This case set important precedents for patent law in the United Kingdom, originating the well-known Windsurfer Test regarding the steps of inventiveness and non-obviousness.

The case, Chilvers, Hayling, and a replica of Chilvers' original board, were featured on an episode of The One Show in 2009.
