= Havant Borough Council elections =

Local government elections in Hampshire, England

One third of Havant Borough Council in Hampshire, England is elected each year, followed by one year without election. Since the last boundary changes in 2002, 38 councillors have been elected from 14 wards.

== Council elections ==
Summary of the council composition after recent council elections, click on the year for full details of each election. Boundary changes took place for the 2002 election reducing the number of seats by 4, leading to the whole council being elected in that year.

Composition of the council
Year	Conservative	Labour	Liberal Democrats (Note: Includes totals for the predecessors of the Liberal Democrats, the Liberal Party and SDP (both of which participated in the Alliance).)	Green (Note: Includes totals for the predecessors of the Green Party of England and Wales, the Ecology Party and Green Party UK.)	UKIP	Reform UK	Independents & Others	Council control after election
Local government reorganisation; council established (42 seats)
1973	8	8	11	–	–	–	15	No overall control
New seat boundaries (42 seats)
1976	18	9	3	0	–	–	12	No overall control
1978	23	11	1	0	–	–	7	Conservative
1979	27	12	0	0	–	–	3	Conservative
1980	28	11	0	0	–	–	3	Conservative
1982	27	8	3	0	–	–	4	Conservative
1983	25	9	4	0	–	–	4	Conservative
1984	25	9	5	0	–	–	3	Conservative
1986	22	10	6	0	–	–	4	Conservative
1987	23	11	4	0	–	–	4	Conservative
1988	23	11	4	0	–	–	4	Conservative
1990	19	11	5	0	–	–	7	No overall control
1991	19	12	5	0	–	–	6	No overall control
1992	20	12	5	0	–	–	5	No overall control
1994	16	12	11	0	0	–	3	No overall control
1995	12	12	15	0	0	–	3	No overall control
1996	8	11	20	0	0	–	3	No overall control
1998	14	8	14	0	0	–	6	No overall control
1999	16	8	11	0	0	–	7 (Note: 6 independents, 1 Liberal)	No overall control
2000	20	11	8	0	0	–	3	No overall control
New seat boundaries (38 seats)
2002	23	9	6	0	0	–	0	Conservative
2003	23	8	7	0	0	–	0	Conservative
2004	27	6	5	0	0	–	0	Conservative
2006	30	4	4	0	0	–	0	Conservative
2007	31	4	3	0	0	–	0	Conservative
2008	32	3	3	0	0	–	0	Conservative
2010	34	1	3	0	0	–	0	Conservative
2011	35	1	2	0	0	–	0	Conservative
2012	34	3	1	0	0	–	0	Conservative
2014	31	4	1	0	2	–	0	Conservative
2015	31	4	1	0	2	–	0	Conservative
2016	31	2	1	0	4	–	0	Conservative
2018	33	2	1	0	2	–	0	Conservative
2019	33	2	1	0	2	–	0	Conservative
2021	36	1	1	0	0	0	0	Conservative
2022	36	2	0	0	0	0	0	Conservative
2023	30	4	2	1	0	0	1	Conservative
New seat boundaries (36 seats)
2024	13	10	7	4	0	2	0	No overall control
2026	5	7	5	6	0	10	3	No overall control

== Borough result maps ==
2002 results map

2003 results map

2004 results map

2006 results map

2007 results map

2008 results map

2010 results map

2011 results map

2012 results map

2014 results map

2015 results map

2016 results map

2018 results map

2019 results map

2021 results map

2022 results map

2023 results map

2024 results map

2026 results map

== By-election results ==
By-elections occur when seats become vacant between council elections. Below is a summary of recent by-elections; full by-election results can be found by clicking on the by-election name.

By-election	Date	Incumbent party	Winning party
Stakes	3 July 1997	Liberal Democrats	Conservative
Warren Park	25 September 1997	Liberal Democrats	Liberal Democrats
Hart Plain by-election	15 February 2001	Liberal Democrats	Liberal Democrats
St Faiths by-election	7 June 2001	Conservative	Conservative
Waterloo by-election	13 November 2003	Conservative	Conservative
Bedhampton by-election	24 February 2005	Liberal Democrats	Liberal Democrats
Battins by-election	2 November 2006	Conservative	Liberal Democrats
Hart Plain by-election	30 November 2006	Liberal Democrats	Conservative
Waterloo by-election	4 September 2008	Conservative	Conservative
Battins by-election	15 November 2012	Liberal Democrats	Liberal Democrats
Bedhampton by-election	2 May 2013	Conservative	Conservative
Emsworth by-election	2 May 2013	Conservative	Conservative
Waterloo by-election	24 October 2013	Conservative	Conservative
Bondfields by-election	3 March 2016	Conservative	Conservative
Emsworth by-election	4 May 2017	Conservative	Conservative
Emsworth by-election	19 November 2026	Green	Green
