= 2012 Havant Borough Council election =

2012 UK local government election

← 2011	3 May 2012	2014 →

14 of 38 seats to Havant Borough Council 20 seats needed for a majority
	First party	Second party	Third party
Party	Conservative	Liberal Democrats	Labour
Seats before	35	2	1
Seats won	11	3	0
Seats after	34	3	1
Seat change	▼1	▼1	▲2
Popular vote	12,835	6,296	3,289
- Results by Ward
Council control before election
Conservative
Council control after election
Conservative

The 2012 Havant Borough Council election took place on 3 May 2012 to elect members of Havant Borough Council in Hampshire, England. One third of the council was up for election and the Conservative Party stayed in overall control of the council.

After the election, the composition of the council was:

- Conservative 34
- Labour 3
- Liberal Democrats 1

== Background ==
Before the election the Conservatives ran the council with 35 seats, compared to 2 for the Liberal Democrats and 1 for Labour. Labour targeted Warren Park, where both seats were held by the Conservatives, but the Conservative councillor Mike Sceal had won the seat at the 2008 election by only 24 votes.

== Election result ==
The Conservatives stayed in strong control of the council after losing just 1 seat. Labour gained 2 seats, one each from the Conservatives and Liberal Democrats, while the other Labour councillor Terry Hart held his seat in Bondfields. Richard Brown gained Warren Park from the Conservative after having lost the seat at the 2010 election, while Ralph Cousins regained Battins from the Liberal Democrats, which reduced the Liberal Democrats to 1 seat on the council. Overall turnout at the election was 27.5%.

Havant local election result 2012
Party	Seats	Gains	Losses	Net gain/loss	Seats %	Votes %	Votes	+/−
Conservative	11	0	1	-1	78.6	50.1	12,835	-9.2%
Labour	3	2	0	+2	21.4	24.6	6,296	+8.1%
Liberal Democrats	0	0	1	-1	0	12.8	3,289	-2.0%
Green	0	0	0	0	0	6.7	1,719	+1.2%
UKIP	0	0	0	0	0	5.8	1,490	+1.9%

== Ward results ==
=== Barncroft ===
Barncroft
Party	Candidate	Votes	%	±%
Conservative	Yvonne Weeks	443	46.9	+4.4
Labour	George Smith	274	29.0	+2.4
UKIP	Ray Finch	164	17.4	+7.9
Liberal Democrats	Hilary Bolt	63	6.7	−14.8
Majority		169	17.9	+2.0
Turnout		944	20.5	−30.1
Conservative hold		Swing		

=== Battins ===
Battins
Party	Candidate	Votes	%	±%
Labour	Ralph Cousins	431	40.7	+13.3
Liberal Democrats	Faith Ponsonby	371	35.1	−3.2
Conservative	Kris Sapcote	256	24.2	−10.1
Majority		60	5.6	
Turnout		1,058	21.6	−27.7
Labour gain from Liberal Democrats		Swing		

=== Bedhampton ===
Bedhampton
Party	Candidate	Votes	%	±%
Conservative	Ken Smith	927	42.9	−2.5
Liberal Democrats	Chris Maple	434	20.1	−7.6
Labour	Derek Smith	346	16.0	+1.6
UKIP	Stephen Harris	299	13.8	+6.9
Green	Terry Mitchell	155	7.2	+1.7
Majority		493	22.8	+5.0
Turnout		2,161	30.4	−12.6
Conservative hold		Swing		

=== Bondfields ===
Bondfields
Party	Candidate	Votes	%	±%
Labour	Terry Hart	503	51.7	+25.8
Conservative	Diana Patrick	335	34.5	+0.4
Liberal Democrats	Steve Marshall	134	13.8	−18.9
Majority		168	17.2	
Turnout		972	19.5	−32.7
Labour hold		Swing		

=== Cowplain ===
Cowplain
Party	Candidate	Votes	%	±%
Conservative	David Keast	1,168	58.0	−7.4
Labour	Ken Monks	381	18.9	+3.7
Green	Bruce Holman	293	14.5	+6.8
Liberal Democrats	John Jacobs	172	8.5	−3.2
Majority		787	39.1	−11.1
Turnout		2,014	27.1	−12.9
Conservative hold		Swing		

=== Emsworth ===
Emsworth
Party	Candidate	Votes	%	±%
Conservative	Brendan Gibb-Gray	1,698	57.8	−0.9
Green	Sophie Cobbett	583	19.8	+11.0
Labour	Colin Blunden	370	12.6	−0.3
Liberal Democrats	Roisin Miller	288	9.8	−3.7
Majority		1,115	37.9	−7.2
Turnout		2,939	37.7	−15.0
Conservative hold		Swing		

=== Hart Plain ===
Hart Plain
Party	Candidate	Votes	%	±%
Conservative	Elaine Shimbart	1,333	61.5	+2.6
Labour	Howard Sherlock	538	24.8	+4.1
Liberal Democrats	Elaine Woodard	297	13.7	−6.7
Majority		795	36.7	−1.4
Turnout		2,168	29.0	−9.5
Conservative hold		Swing		

=== Hayling East ===
Hayling East
Party	Candidate	Votes	%	±%
Conservative	Leah Turner	939	43.9	−15.8
Labour	Sue Underwood	467	21.8	+7.3
UKIP	Gary Kerrin	454	21.2	+10.0
Green	Paul Valentine	167	7.8	+2.2
Liberal Democrats	Paul Pritchard	114	5.3	−3.7
Majority		472	22.0	−23.2
Turnout		2,141	29.2	−11.0
Conservative hold		Swing		

=== Hayling West ===
Hayling West
Party	Candidate	Votes	%	±%
Conservative	Vic Jones	1,110	46.7	−20.9
UKIP	John Perry	573	24.1	+17.3
Labour	Michael Clarke	422	17.7	+5.8
Green	Sue Holt	169	7.1	−0.1
Liberal Democrats	Ben Marshall	104	4.4	−2.0
Majority		537	22.6	−33.1
Turnout		2,378	34.4	−13.0
Conservative hold		Swing		

=== Purbrook ===
Purbrook
Party	Candidate	Votes	%	±%
Conservative	Caren Tarrant	1,081	57.4	−4.4
Labour	Lisa Wheeler	587	31.2	+7.0
Liberal Democrats	Michael Bolt	214	11.4	−2.7
Majority		494	26.2	−11.4
Turnout		1,882	25.8	−12.8
Conservative hold		Swing		

=== St. Faiths ===
St. Faiths
Party	Candidate	Votes	%	±%
Conservative	David Guest	1,221	51.0	−2.6
Labour	Beryl Francis	540	22.5	+6.0
Green	Tim Dawes	352	14.7	+6.1
Liberal Democrats	Jane Briggs	283	11.8	−3.3
Majority		681	28.4	−8.7
Turnout		2,396	33.6	−14.2
Conservative hold		Swing		

=== Stakes ===
Stakes
Party	Candidate	Votes	%	±%
Conservative	Rory Heard	774	50.0	−3.6
Labour	Margaret Beauvoisin	552	35.7	+8.0
Liberal Democrats	Ann Bazley	222	14.3	−4.4
Majority		222	14.3	−11.6
Turnout		1,548	20.8	−11.1
Conservative hold		Swing		

=== Warren Park ===
Warren Park
Party	Candidate	Votes	%	±%
Labour	Richard Brown	361	44.3	+13.7
Liberal Democrats	Ann Brown	237	29.1	+0.9
Conservative	Mike Sceal	216	26.5	−7.7
Majority		124	15.2	
Turnout		814	16.2	−27.9
Labour gain from Conservative		Swing		

=== Waterloo ===
Waterloo
Party	Candidate	Votes	%	±%
Conservative	John Hunt	1,334	60.3	−6.5
Labour	Francesca Robinson	524	23.7	+11.6
Liberal Democrats	Fred Dunford	356	16.1	+2.8
Majority		810	36.6	−17.0
Turnout		2,214	28.7	−14.3
Conservative hold		Swing		

== By-elections between 2012 and 2014 ==
=== Battins ===
A by-election took place in Battins ward on 15 November 2012 after Katie Ray resigned from the council. Faith Ponsonby held the seat for the Liberal Democrats by a majority of 264 votes on a turnout of just 18%.

Battins by-election 15 November 2012
Party	Candidate	Votes	%	±%
Liberal Democrats	Faith Ponsonby	452	51.0	+15.9
Labour	Virginia Steel	188	21.2	−19.5
Conservative	Kristian Sapcote	153	17.2	−6.9
UKIP	Ray Finch	94	10.6	+10.6
Majority		264	29.8	
Turnout		887	18.1	−3.5
Liberal Democrats hold		Swing		

=== Bedhampton ===
A by-election took place in Bedhampton ward on 2 May 2013 after the resignation of Conservative councillor Jenny Wride. The seat was held for the Conservatives by David Smith by a majority of 114 votes.

Bedhampton by-election 2 May 2013
Party	Candidate	Votes	%	±%
Conservative	David Smith	766	33.1	−9.8
Liberal Democrats	Ann Brown	652	28.1	+8.1
UKIP	Stephen Harris	584	25.2	+11.4
Labour	Anthony Berry	191	8.2	−7.8
Green	Terry Mitchell	124	5.4	−1.8
Majority		114	4.9	−17.9
Turnout		2,317	32.4	+2.0
Conservative hold		Swing		

=== Emsworth ===
A by-election took place in Emsworth ward on 2 May 2013 after the resignation of the former Conservative council leader David Gillett. The seat was held for the Conservatives by Colin Mackey by a majority of 692 votes.

Emsworth by-election 2 May 2013
Party	Candidate	Votes	%	±%
Conservative	Colin Mackey	1,296	45.7	−12.1
UKIP	Ian Reddoch	604	21.3	+21.3
Green	Susan Kelly	353	12.4	−7.4
Labour	Christine Armitage	350	12.3	−0.3
Liberal Democrats	Roisin Miller	234	8.2	−1.6
Majority		692	24.4	−13.5
Turnout		2,837	35.8	−1.9
Conservative hold		Swing		

=== Waterloo ===
A by-election took place in Waterloo ward on 24 October 2013 after the resignation of Conservative councillor John Hunt. The seat was held for the Conservatives by Peter Wade by a majority of 237 votes.

Waterloo by-election 24 October 2013
Party	Candidate	Votes	%	±%
Conservative	Peter Wade	683	44.0	−16.3
Liberal Democrats	David Crichton	446	28.7	+12.6
UKIP	Gary Kerrin	296	19.0	+19.0
Labour	Antony Berry	129	8.3	−15.4
Majority		237	15.3	−21.3
Turnout		1,554	20.0	−8.7
Conservative hold		Swing		
