= 2021 Havant Borough Council election =

2021 UK local government election

- 6 May 2021

14 seats up for election 20 seats needed for a majority
- Turnout: 31%
	First party	Second party	Third party
Party	Conservative	Labour	Liberal Democrats
Last election	12	0	0
Seats before	33	2	2
Seats won	15	1	1
Seat change	+3	−1	−1
	Fourth party
Party	UKIP
Last election	0
Seats before	1
Seats won	0
Seat change	−1
- Map showing the results of the 2021 Havant Borough Council election
Council control before election
Conservative
Council control after election
Conservative

Elections to Havant Borough Council took place on 6 May 2021 as part of the 2021 United Kingdom local elections. They took place at the same time as the elections for Hampshire County Council and the Hampshire Police and Crime Commissioner.

== Background ==
In the previous election, the Conservative Party successfully held all 11 seats up for election, albeit with an overall slightly reduced vote percentage. The statement of persons nominated was published on Friday 9 April 2021.

== Results summary ==
2021 Havant Borough Council election
Party	This election				Full council			This election		
Party	Candidates	Seats	Net	Seats %	Other	Total	Total %	Votes	Votes %	+/−
Conservative	{{{candidates}}}	14	▲3	100.0	22	36	94.7	17,430	59.1	+15.9
Labour	{{{candidates}}}	0	▼1	0.0	1	1	2.6	5,394	18.3	+7.5
Liberal Democrats	{{{candidates}}}	0	Steady	0.0	1	1	2.6	4,349	14.8	-4.1
Green	{{{candidates}}}	0	Steady	0.0	0	0	0.0	2,185	7.4	+1.0
Hampshire Independents	{{{candidates}}}	0	Steady	0.0	0	0	0.0	122	0.4	New
UKIP	{{{candidates}}}	0	▼2	0.0	0	0	0.0	0	0.0	-20.7

== Ward results ==
Source: Havant Borough Council

=== Barncroft ===
Barncroft
Party	Candidate	Votes	%	±%
Conservative	Yvonne Margaret Weeks	578	66.2	+6.9
Labour	Anthony Dixon Berry	177	20.2	−11.7
Liberal Democrats	Bradley Sean Lewis Stuart-James	110	12.6	+3.8
Majority		401	69.0	
Turnout		873	19	
Conservative hold		Swing		

=== Battins ===
The incumbent Malc Carpenter, previously of UKIP, stood as an independent.

Battins
Party	Candidate	Votes	%	±%
Conservative	Tom Moutray	430	48.3	+16.8
Labour	Jason Clyde Horton	221	24.8	−5.1
Hampshire Independents	Malc Carpenter	122	13.7	—
Liberal Democrats	Annie Martin	118	13.2	−25.6
Majority		209		
Turnout		902	18.25	
Conservative gain from UKIP		Swing		

=== Bedhampton ===
Bedhampton
Party	Candidate	Votes	%	±%
Conservative	David William Guest	1,255	51.5	−8.8
Liberal Democrats	Philippa Mary Irene Grey	762	31.3	+4.0
Labour Co-op	Philip Pearson	232	9.5	−3.0
Green	Rosie Blackburn	156	6.4	—
Majority		493		
Turnout		2437	32.55	
Conservative hold		Swing		

=== Bondfields ===
Bondfields
Party	Candidate	Votes	%	±%
Conservative	Richard Brian John Stone	590	59.1	+6.2
Labour	Amy Louise Redsull	302	30.2	−3.5
Liberal Democrats	Isabel Portia Elise Harrison	100	10.0	−3.4
Majority		288		
Turnout		999	20.1	
Conservative gain from Labour		Swing		

=== Cowplain ===
Labour did not stand a candidate in this ward, unlike the previous election, when they came second with 13.7% of the vote.

Cowplain
Party	Candidate	Votes	%	±%
Conservative	David John Keast	1,643	69.7	+1.5
Green	Quentin Robert Wallace-Jones	395	16.8	+8.6
Liberal Democrats	Lisa Tyler Jackson	295	12.5	+2.5
Majority		1248		
Turnout		2358	31.71	
Conservative hold		Swing		

=== Emsworth ===
Emsworth
Party	Candidate	Votes	%	±%
Conservative	Lulu Bowerman	1,961	52.0	−17.1
Labour	Steve Bilbe	777	20.6	−1.1
Green	Anne Marie Sayer	511	13.6	—
Liberal Democrats	Jane Marianne Briggs	493	13.1	−3.8
Majority		1184		
Turnout		3769	44.64	
Conservative hold		Swing		

=== Hart Plain ===
The Green Party did not stand a candidate in this ward, unlike the previous election, when they came fourth with 7.6% of the vote.

Hart Plain
Party	Candidate	Votes	%	±%
Conservative	Elaine Louanne Shimbart	1,512	69.5	−3.1
Labour	Susan Arnold	392	18.0	+1.7
Liberal Democrats	Suzette Gray	248	11.4	+1.7
Majority		1120		
Turnout		2176	28.23	
Conservative hold		Swing		

=== Hayling East ===
UKIP did not stand a candidate in this ward, unlike the previous election, when they came third with 10.6% of the vote.

Hayling East
Party	Candidate	Votes	%	±%
Conservative	Leah Turner	1,426	55.1	−4.7
Liberal Democrats	Wilf Forrow	505	19.5	+13.2
Green	Robert Frederick Graham Soar	329	12.7	+7.7
Labour	Lynn Tolmon	316	12.2	−6.2
Majority		921		
Turnout		2587	33.98	
Conservative hold		Swing		

=== Hayling West ===
Hayling West
Party	Candidate	Votes	%	±%
Conservative	Brenda Joan Linger	1,458	53.7	−12.1
Labour	Sheree Dawn Earnshaw	479	17.6	+3.5
Liberal Democrats	Paul Gray	476	17.5	+5.0
Green	Richard Andrew Lanchester	268	9.9	—
Majority		979		
Turnout		2716	38.91	
Conservative hold		Swing		

=== Purbrook ===
Purbrook
Party	Candidate	Votes	%	±%
Conservative	Caren Howard	1,513	63.1	+1.2
Labour	Simon Bruce Hagan	373	15.6	−3.7
Liberal Democrats	Paul Tansom	266	11.1	−2.2
Green	Patrick James Bealey	219	9.1	+3.6
Majority		1140		
Turnout		2396		
Conservative hold		Swing		

=== St. Faith's ===
St. Faiths
Party	Candidate	Votes	%	±%
Conservative	Imogen Payter	1,497	45.9	−11.2
Labour	Phil Munday	1073	32.9	+14.4
Liberal Democrats	Faith Ponsonby	359	11.0	−2.8
Green	Shelley Elizabeth Christine Saunders	307	9.4	−1.2
Majority		424		
Turnout		3258	40	
Conservative hold		Swing		

=== Stakes ===
Stakes
Party	Candidate	Votes	%	±%
Conservative	Dianne Elizabeth Lloyd	1,211	66.1	+7.6
Labour	Lorraine Louise Brown	424	23.1	−5.8
Liberal Democrats	Gregory Philip Anthony Pearson	181	9.9	−2.6
Majority		787		
Turnout		1832	23.67	
Conservative hold		Swing		

=== Warren Park ===
UKIP, the incumbent party, did not stand a candidate in this ward; in the 2019 election, the UKIP candidate came joint third with 13.7% of the vote.

Warren Park
Party	Candidate	Votes	%	±%
Conservative	Tony Denton	487	58.6	+22.6
Labour	Richard Joseph Spence Brown	247	29.7	−7.0
Liberal Democrats	John Desmond Jones	92	11.0	−2.7
Majority		240		
Turnout		831	16.33	
Conservative gain from UKIP		Swing		

=== Waterloo ===
Waterloo
Party	Candidate	Votes	%	±%
Conservative	Peter Philip Wade	1,869	71.6	+2.1
Labour	Howard Frank Sherlock	381	14.6	—
Liberal Democrats	Izzy Fletcher	344	13.2	−17.3
Majority		1488	57.0	
Turnout		2612	32.05	
Conservative hold		Swing		
