= 2002 Havant Borough Council election =

2002 UK local government election

← 2000	2 May 2002	2003 →

All 38 seats to Havant Borough Council 20 seats needed for a majority
	First party	Second party	Third party
Party	Conservative	Labour	Liberal Democrats
Seats after	23	9	6
Popular vote	34,315	12,822	15,693
- Results by Ward
Council control before election
No overall control
Council control after election
Conservative

The 2002 Havant Borough Council election took place on 2 May 2002 to elect members of Havant Borough Council in Hampshire, England. The whole council was up for election after boundary changes reduced the number of seats by 4. The Conservative Party gained overall control of the council from no overall control.

== Election result ==
The Conservatives won a majority on the council, taking 23 of the 38 seats on the council. Labour dropped from 11 to 9 seats, while the Liberal Democrats fell to 6 seats from 8 previously. The 3 Independent councillors had stood down at the election, while the boundary changes were reported to have cost Labour 4 seats. Turnout was up on the 2000 election, but dropped to a low of just 14.6% in Warren Park ward.

Havant local election result 2002
Party	Seats	Gains	Losses	Net gain/loss	Seats %	Votes %	Votes	+/−
Conservative	23			+3	60.5	52.6	34,315	+2.4%
Labour	9			-2	23.7	19.7	12,822	+3.8%
Liberal Democrats	6			-2	15.8	24.1	15,693	-5.2%
Green	0			0	0	3.2	2,077	+3.2%
Independent	0			-3	0	0.4	289	-4.0%

== Ward results ==
=== Barncroft ===
Barncroft (2 seats)
Party	Candidate	Votes	%	±%
Labour	Ralph Cousins	416		
Labour	Ronald Hoyle	406		
Liberal Democrats	Peter Lake	235		
Conservative	Sheila Culley	195		
Conservative	Carol Wynne	164		
Turnout		1,416	18.9	

=== Battins ===
Battins (2 seats)
Party	Candidate	Votes	%	±%
Labour	June Hanan	529		
Labour	Paul Hansford	476		
Conservative	Jane Rayner	267		
Conservative	Ian Beagley	238		
Liberal Democrats	Cecil Sargent	212		
Turnout		1,722	20.3	

=== Bedhampton ===
Bedhampton (3 seats)
Party	Candidate	Votes	%	±%
Liberal Democrats	Ronald Bellinger	1,408		
Liberal Democrats	Stephen Marshall	1,224		
Liberal Democrats	Anthony Welch	1,134		
Conservative	Kenneth Harris	1,127		
Conservative	Angela Guest	1,111		
Conservative	Mark Ward	1,066		
Labour	William Fish	285		
Labour	Carl Roberts	258		
Labour	John Jackson	254		
Green	Terry Mitchell	140		
Turnout		8,007	40.9	

=== Bondsfields ===
Bondfields (2 seats)
Party	Candidate	Votes	%	±%
Labour	Barry Gardner	803		
Labour	Terence Hart	741		
Conservative	Mary Brown	226		
Conservative	Jennifer Wride	209		
Liberal Democrats	Valerie Gatenby	187		
Turnout		2,166	23.6	

=== Cowplain ===
Cowplain (3 seats)
Party	Candidate	Votes	%	±%
Conservative	Anthony Briggs	1,170		
Conservative	David Keast	1,056		
Conservative	Marjorie Smallcorn	999		
Liberal Democrats	Valerie Hartridge	961		
Liberal Democrats	Flora Ponsonby	766		
Turnout		4,952	27.9	

=== Emsworth ===
Emsworth (3 seats)
Party	Candidate	Votes	%	±%
Conservative	David Gillett	1,842		
Conservative	David Colson	1,788		
Conservative	Virginia Wilson-Smith	1,727		
Liberal Democrats	Hugh Benzie	1,056		
Liberal Democrats	Gillian Cosslett	849		
Liberal Democrats	John Cosslett	803		
Labour	Anna Fitter	429		
Labour	William Gilchrist	412		
Labour	Phillip Rees	308		
Green	Michael Wood	243		
Turnout		9,457	42.8	

=== Hart Plain ===
Hart Plain (3 seats)
Party	Candidate	Votes	%	±%
Liberal Democrats	Ronald Purkis	896		
Liberal Democrats	Sheila Troke	875		
Conservative	Leonard Shaw	800		
Conservative	Jacqueline Branson	758		
Liberal Democrats	Christine Pylee	750		
Conservative	Gopa Chakrabarti	673		
Independent	Kevin Ratcliffe	289		
Turnout		5,041	25.0	

=== Hayling East ===
Hayling East (3 seats)
Party	Candidate	Votes	%	±%
Conservative	Gordon Erlebach	1,381		
Conservative	David Collins	1,311		
Conservative	Sheila Pearce	1,311		
Labour	Michael Clarke	561		
Labour	Lesley Marsden	519		
Labour	Sheila Mealy	500		
Liberal Democrats	John Clouting	355		
Green	Frederick Gibson	289		
Turnout		6,227	32.8	

=== Hayling West ===
Hayling West (3 seats)
Party	Candidate	Votes	%	±%
Conservative	Francis Pearce	1,590		
Conservative	Victor Pierce-Jones	1,565		
Conservative	David Weymouth	1,426		
Labour	Susan Underwood	433		
Labour	Graham Manning	425		
Labour	Andrew Stacey	409		
Liberal Democrats	Jill Allum	390		
Green	Gillian Leek	286		
Turnout		6,524	34.6	

=== Purbrook ===
Purbrook (3 seats)
Party	Candidate	Votes	%	±%
Conservative	Gwendoline Blackett	1,500		
Conservative	David Farrow	1,413		
Conservative	Hilary Farrow	1,312		
Labour	William Wheeler	485		
Labour	Howard Sherlock	478		
Liberal Democrats	Rodney Crawford	467		
Labour	Nicola Sherlock	458		
Turnout		6,113	30.8	

=== St. Faiths ===
St. Faiths (3 seats)
Party	Candidate	Votes	%	±%
Conservative	June Fulcher	1,531		
Conservative	David Guest	1,393		
Conservative	Raymond Bolton	1,389		
Liberal Democrats	Dennis West	949		
Liberal Democrats	Liam Hutchings	926		
Green	Timothy Dawes	726		
Liberal Democrats	Roy Middleton	692		
Labour	Beryl Francis	430		
Labour	Alan Price	341		
Labour	Derek Smith	279		
Turnout		8,656	45.4	

=== Stakes ===
Stakes (3 seats)
Party	Candidate	Votes	%	±%
Conservative	Olwyn Kennedy	747		
Conservative	Nigel Tarrant	688		
Labour	Margaret Beauvoisin	634		
Liberal Democrats	Leslie Voice	428		
Green	Kevin Jacks	393		
Labour	Kim Vassallo	385		
Labour	Ronald Russell	379		
Turnout		3,654	21.4	

=== Warren Park ===
Warren Park (2 seats)
Party	Candidate	Votes	%	±%
Labour	Richard Brown	407		
Labour	Virginia Steel	382		
Conservative	Thelma Carpenter	178		
Conservative	Clive Colson	164		
Liberal Democrats	Michael Ponsonby	130		
Turnout		1,261	14.6	

=== Waterloo ===
Waterloo (3 seats)
Party	Candidate	Votes	%	±%
Liberal Democrats	Catherine Cole	unopposed		
Conservative	Kenneth Moss	unopposed		
Conservative	Geoffrey Tart	unopposed		
