= 2014 Havant Borough Council election =

2014 UK local government election

← 2012	22 May 2014	2015 →

14 of 38 seats to Havant Borough Council 20 seats needed for a majority
	First party	Second party
Party	Conservative	UKIP
Seats before	34	0
Seats won	10	2
Seats after	31	2
Seat change	▼3	▲2
Popular vote	14,014	4,673
	Third party	Fourth party
Party	Labour	Liberal Democrats
Seats before	3	1
Seats won	1	1
Seats after	4	1
Seat change	▲1	Steady
Popular vote	5,481	3,600
- Results by Ward
Council control before election
Conservative
Council control after election
Conservative

The 2014 Havant Borough Council election took place on 22 May 2014 to elect members of Havant Borough Council in Hampshire, England. One third of the council was up for election and the Conservative Party stayed in overall control of the council.

After the election, the composition of the council was:

- Conservative 31
- Labour 4
- UK Independence Party 2
- Liberal Democrats 1

== Background ==
Before the election Tony Briggs announced his resignation as leader of the council and the Conservative group on the council. Mike Cheshire was chosen in April 2014 by the Conservatives as their new leader, defeating 3 other candidates.

14 seats were contested at the election with the Conservatives, Labour and Liberal Democrats standing for every seat, while the Green Party stood in 8 seats and the UK Independence Party (UKIP) stood in 6 seats. The composition of the council before the election was 34 Conservatives, 3 Labour and 1 Liberal Democrat councillors.

On 19 May 2014 candidates from the 5 parties standing at the election held a debate with parking, and especially the increase in parking charges in 2013, being a major issue.

== Election result ==
The Conservatives lost 3 seats, 2 to UKIP and 1 to Labour, but still won 10 of the 14 seats contested. This reduced the Conservatives to 31 of the 38 seats on the council, Labour went up to 4 seats, UKIP won their first 2 seats, while the Liberal Democrats remained on 1 seat. Overall turnout at the election was 32.8%, up from 27.5% at the 2012 election.

The UKIP gains from the Conservatives came in Hayling East, where John Perry took the seat after a recount, and in Stakes ward, where Gary Kerrin won by 34 votes after the Conservative councillor Olwyn Kennedy stood down at the election. Meanwhile, in the only other change Labour's Beryl Francis gained Warren Park from the Conservatives, after Mark Johnson did not stand for re-election. Among those to hold their seats were the leader of the Conservatives Mike Cheshire in Hart Plain ward and the only Liberal Democrat councillor Faith Ponsonby in Battins.

Havant local election result 2014
Party	Seats	Gains	Losses	Net gain/loss	Seats %	Votes %	Votes	+/−
Conservative	10	0	3	-3	71.4	45.8	14,014	-4.3
UKIP	2	2	0	+2	14.3	15.3	4,673	+9.5
Labour	1	1	0	+1	7.1	17.9	5,481	-6.7
Liberal Democrats	1	0	0	0	7.1	11.8	3,600	-1.0
Green	0	0	0	0	0.0	9.2	2,799	+2.5

== Ward results ==
=== Barncroft ===
Barncroft
Party	Candidate	Votes	%	±%
Conservative	George Fairhurst	567	51.3	+4.4
Labour	Philip Pearson	357	32.3	+3.3
Liberal Democrats	Susan Pook	181	16.4	+9.7
Majority		210	19.0	+1.1
Turnout		1,105	24.6	+4.1
Conservative hold		Swing		

=== Battins ===
Battins
Party	Candidate	Votes	%	±%
Liberal Democrats	Faith Ponsonby	601	51.5	+16.4
Labour	Anthony Berry	325	27.8	−12.9
Conservative	Mark Johnson	241	20.7	−3.5
Majority		276	23.7	
Turnout		1,167	24.9	+3.3
Liberal Democrats hold		Swing		

=== Bedhampton ===
Bedhampton
Party	Candidate	Votes	%	±%
Conservative	David Smith	1,177	47.4	+4.5
Liberal Democrats	Jane Briggs	478	19.2	−0.9
Green	Terry Mitchell	466	18.8	+11.6
Labour	George Smith	364	14.6	−1.4
Majority		699	28.1	+5.3
Turnout		2,485	35.1	+4.7
Conservative hold		Swing		

=== Bondfields ===
Bondfields
Party	Candidate	Votes	%	±%
Conservative	Frida Edwards	401	33.6	−0.9
Labour	Munazza Faiz	340	28.5	−23.2
Green	Tara Fisher	318	26.6	+26.6
Liberal Democrats	Michael Bolt	135	11.3	−2.5
Majority		61	5.1	
Turnout		1,194	24.6	+5.1
Conservative hold		Swing		

=== Cowplain ===
Cowplain
Party	Candidate	Votes	%	±%
Conservative	Anthony Briggs	1,501	62.0	+4.0
Green	Bruce Holman	382	15.8	+1.3
Labour	Kenneth Monks	349	14.4	−4.5
Liberal Democrats	John Jacobs	189	7.8	−0.7
Majority		1,119	46.2	+7.1
Turnout		2,421	33.0	+5.9
Conservative hold		Swing		

=== Emsworth ===
Emsworth
Party	Candidate	Votes	%	±%
Conservative	Colin Mackey	1,617	47.6	−10.2
UKIP	John Davis	713	21.0	+21.0
Green	Victoria Gould	401	11.8	−8.0
Labour	Eric Whitehead	372	10.9	−1.7
Liberal Democrats	Christopher Maple	297	8.7	−1.1
Majority		904	26.6	−11.3
Turnout		3,400	42.2	+4.5
Conservative hold		Swing		

=== Hart Plain ===
Hart Plain
Party	Candidate	Votes	%	±%
Conservative	Michael Cheshire	1,318	55.1	−6.4
Labour	Sheila Mealy	741	31.0	+6.2
Liberal Democrats	Elaine Woodard	335	14.0	+0.3
Majority		577	24.1	−12.6
Turnout		2,394	32.0	+3.0
Conservative hold		Swing		

=== Hayling East ===
Hayling East
Party	Candidate	Votes	%	±%
UKIP	John Perry	1,044	39.6	+18.4
Conservative	John Smith	996	37.7	−6.2
Labour	Michael Clarke	313	11.9	−9.9
Green	Paul Valentine	184	7.0	−0.8
Liberal Democrats	Anne Martin	102	3.9	−1.4
Majority		48	1.9	
Turnout		2,639	35.8	+6.6
UKIP gain from Conservative		Swing		

=== Hayling West ===
Hayling West
Party	Candidate	Votes	%	±%
Conservative	Michael Wilson	1,359	50.4	+3.7
UKIP	Philip Melhuish	708	26.2	+2.1
Labour	Richard Sams	270	10.0	−7.7
Green	Susan Holt	222	8.2	+1.1
Liberal Democrats	Richard Brown	139	5.2	+0.8
Majority		651	24.1	+1.5
Turnout		2,698	39.0	+4.6
Conservative hold		Swing		

=== Purbrook ===
Purbrook
Party	Candidate	Votes	%	±%
Conservative	Gwendoline Blackett	1,475	62.5	+5.1
Labour	Nicola Potts	626	26.5	−4.7
Liberal Democrats	Hilary Bolt	258	10.9	−0.5
Majority		849	36.0	+9.8
Turnout		2,359	33.0	+7.2
Conservative hold		Swing		

=== St. Faiths ===
St. Faiths
Party	Candidate	Votes	%	±%
Conservative	Jacqueline Branson	1,104	38.8	−12.2
Green	Timothy Dawes	626	22.0	+7.3
UKIP	Wendy Coates	569	20.0	+20.0
Labour	Philip Munday	364	12.8	−9.7
Liberal Democrats	Michael Blanch	180	6.3	−5.5
Majority		478	16.8	−11.6
Turnout		2,843	39.6	+6.0
Conservative hold		Swing		

=== Stakes ===
Stakes
Party	Candidate	Votes	%	±%
UKIP	Gary Kerrin	792	37.9	+37.9
Conservative	John Cooper	758	36.2	−13.8
Labour	Barry Steel	395	18.9	−16.8
Liberal Democrats	Kenneth Cosslett	147	7.0	−7.3
Majority		34	1.7	
Turnout		2,092	28.0	+7.2
UKIP gain from Conservative		Swing		

=== Warren Park ===
Warren Park
Party	Candidate	Votes	%	±%
Labour	Beryl Francis	407	39.7	−4.6
Conservative	Kristian Sapcote	309	30.2	+3.7
Liberal Democrats	Margaret Brown	308	30.1	+1.0
Majority		98	9.6	−5.6
Turnout		1,024	21.2	+5.0
Labour gain from Conservative		Swing		

=== Waterloo ===
Waterloo
Party	Candidate	Votes	%	±%
Conservative	Michael Sceal	1,191	43.4	−16.9
UKIP	Carole Newnham	847	30.8	+30.8
Labour	Sian Laxton	258	9.4	−14.3
Liberal Democrats	David Crichton	250	9.1	−7.0
Green	Arthur Plunkett	200	7.3	+7.3
Majority		344	12.5	−24.1
Turnout		2,746	34.7	+6.0
Conservative hold		Swing		
