= 2016 Havant Borough Council election =

2016 UK local government election

- 5 May 2016

14 of 38 seats to Havant Borough Council 20 seats needed for a majority
	First party	Second party	Third party
Party	Conservative	UKIP	Labour
Seats before	31	2	4
Seats won	11	2	1
Seats after	31	4	2
Seat change	Steady	▲2	▼2
Popular vote	13,094	5,048	5,764
- Results by Ward
Council control before election
Conservative
Council control after election
Conservative

The 2016 Havant Borough Council election took place on 5 May 2016 to elect members of Havant Borough Council in England. This was on the same day as other local elections.

After the election, the composition of the council was:

- Conservative: 31
- UKIP: 4
- Labour: 2
- Liberal Democrats: 1

== Results summary ==
The Conservatives, Labour, and UKIP were the only parties to win seats this election, with UKIP gaining two from Labour.

Havant local election result 2016
Party	Seats	Gains	Losses	Net gain/loss	Seats %	Votes %	Votes	+/−
Conservative	10	0	0	Steady		45.8	14,014	
Labour	1	0	2	▼2		20.7	5,764	
UKIP	2	2	0	▲2		18.1	5,048	
Liberal Democrats	0	0	0	Steady		14.3	3,976	
BNP	0	0	0	Steady			12	

== Ward results ==
=== Barncroft ===
Barncroft
Party	Candidate	Votes	%	±%
Conservative	Yvonne Weeks	417	45.3	
UKIP	Brenda Kerrin	251	27.3	
Labour	Philip Pearson	209	22.7	
Liberal Democrats	Michael Bolt	44	4.8	
Majority		166		
Turnout		921		
Conservative hold		Swing		

=== Battins ===
Battins
Party	Candidate	Votes	%	±%
UKIP	Malcolm Carpenter	319	31.5	
Labour	Ralph Cousins	255	25.2	
Liberal Democrats	Johanna Lowe	243	24.0	
Conservative	Ian Payne	196	19.3	
Majority		64		
Turnout		1,013		
UKIP gain from Conservative		Swing		

=== Bedhampton ===
Bedhampton
Party	Candidate	Votes	%	±%
Conservative	Kenneth Smith	1,051	48.8	
Liberal Democrats	Philippa Gray	750	34.8	
Labour	Freya Savidge-Conway	353	16.4	
Majority		301		
Turnout		2,154		
Conservative hold		Swing		

=== Bondfields ===
Bondfields
Party	Candidate	Votes	%	±%
Labour	Terence Hart	422	37.2	
UKIP	Edmun Whiffen	272	24.0	
Conservative	Curtis Stanfield	267	23.5	
Liberal Democrats	Catherine Billam	174	15.3	
Majority		150		
Turnout		1,135		
Labour hold		Swing		

=== Cowplain ===
Cowplain
Party	Candidate	Votes	%	±%
Conservative	David Keast	1,095	50.7	
UKIP	Andrew Boxall	545	35.2	
Labour	Kenneth Monks	293	13.6	
Liberal Democrats	John Jacobs	228	10.6	
Majority		550		
Turnout		2,161		
Conservative hold		Swing		

=== Emsworth ===
Emsworth
Party	Candidate	Votes	%	±%
Conservative	Carole-Mary Bowerman	1,718	52.7	
Labour	Steve Bilbe	637	19.5	
Liberal Democrats	Christopher Maple	467	14.3	
UKIP	Brian Kerrin	438	13.4	
Majority		1,081		
Turnout		3,260		
Conservative hold		Swing		

=== Hart Plain ===
Hart Plain
Party	Candidate	Votes	%	±%
Conservative	Elaine Shimbart	1,296	62.3	
Labour	Howard Sherlock	428	20.6	
Liberal Democrats	Fiona Drinan	357	17.2	
Majority		868		
Turnout		2,081		
Conservative hold		Swing		

=== Hayling East ===
Hayling East
Party	Candidate	Votes	%	±%
Conservative	Lynne Turner	1,121	42.6	
UKIP	Lesley Marsden	820	31.2	
Labour	Mark Coates	527	20.0	
Liberal Democrats	Natalie Willcocks	162	6.2	
Majority		301		
Turnout		2,630		
Conservative hold		Swing		

=== Hayling West ===
Hayling West
Party	Candidate	Votes	%	±%
Conservative	Joanne Thomas	1,384	52.8	
UKIP	Stephen Humphrey	568	21.7	
Labour	Sheree Earnshaw	418	16.0	
Liberal Democrats	Paul Gray	237	9.0	
BNP	John-Laurence Moore	12	0.5	
Majority		816		
Turnout		2,619		
Conservative hold		Swing		

=== Purbrook ===
Purbrook
Party	Candidate	Votes	%	±%
Conservative	Caren Howard	1,081	48.4	
UKIP	Anthony Gundry	560	25.1	
Labour	Patricia Thomson	400	17.9	
Liberal Democrats	Hilary Bolt	191	8.6	
Majority		521		
Turnout		2,232		
Conservative hold		Swing		

=== St Faith's ===
St. Faiths
Party	Candidate	Votes	%	±%
Conservative	David Guest	1,159	43.6	
Labour	Philip Munday	693	26.1	
UKIP	Richard Coates	436	16.4	
Liberal Democrats	Jane Briggs	370	13.9	
Majority		466		
Turnout		2,658		
Conservative hold		Swing		

=== Stakes ===
Stakes
Party	Candidate	Votes	%	±%
Conservative	Dianne Lloyd	707	39.9	
UKIP	Carole Newnham	519	29.3	
Labour	Anthony Berry	364	20.5	
Liberal Democrats	Ann Bazley	184	10.4	
Majority		188		
Turnout		1,774		
Conservative hold		Swing		

=== Warren Park ===
Warren Park
Party	Candidate	Votes	%	±%
UKIP	John Davis	320	36.2	
Labour	Richard Brown	305	34.5	
Conservative	Hakan Ustabas	131	14.8	
Liberal Democrats	Margaret Brown	128	14.5	
Majority		15		
Turnout		884		
UKIP gain from Conservative		Swing		

=== Waterloo ===
Waterloo
Party	Candidate	Votes	%	±%
Conservative	Peter Wade	1,471	62.0	
Labour	Paul Fencott	460	19.4	
Liberal Democrats	Scott Richardson	441	18.6	
Majority		1,011		
Turnout		2,372		
Conservative hold		Swing		

== By-elections between 2016 and 2018 ==
=== Emsworth ===
A by-election took place in Emsworth ward on 4 May 2017 after the death of Colin Mackey.

Emsworth by-election 4 May 2017
Party	Candidate	Votes	%	±%
Conservative	Richard Kennett	2,020	59.5	+6.8
Liberal Democrats	Crispin Ward	663	19.5	+5.2
Labour	Steve Bilbe	509	15.0	−4.5
UKIP	Alex Spurge	202	6.0	−7.4
Majority		1,357	40.0	
Turnout		3,394		
Conservative hold		Swing		
