= 2004 Havant Borough Council election =

2004 UK local government election

← 2003	10 June 2004	2006 →

16 of 38 seats to Havant Borough Council 20 seats needed for a majority
	First party	Second party	Third party
Party	Conservative	Liberal Democrats	Labour
Seats before	23	8	7
Seats won	12	2	2
Seats after	27	6	5
Seat change	▲4	▼2	▼2
Popular vote	18,290	9,401	5,149
- Results by Ward
Council control before election
Conservative
Council control after election
Conservative

The 2004 Havant Borough Council election took place on 10 June 2004 to elect members of Havant Borough Council in Hampshire, England. One third of the council was up for election and the Conservative Party stayed in overall control of the council.

After the election, the composition of the council was:

- Conservative 27
- Labour 6
- Liberal Democrats 5

== Election result ==
The Conservatives gained seats to hold 27 of the 38 seats on the council, while Labour fell to 6 seats and the Liberal Democrats dropped to hold 5 seats. The Conservative gains included taking Barncroft and Battins wards in Leigh Park from Labour; the first time in over 30 years that Labour had not won all the seats in Leigh Park. Overall turnout at the election was 32.4%.

Havant local election result 2004
Party	Seats	Gains	Losses	Net gain/loss	Seats %	Votes %	Votes	+/−
Conservative	12	4	0	+4	75.0	51.5	18,290	-5.1%
Liberal Democrats	2	0	2	-2	12.5	26.5	9,401	+0.5%
Labour	2	0	2	-2	12.5	14.5	5,149	+1.8%
Green	0	0	0	0	0	5.5	1,970	+1.5%
Independent	0	0	0	0	0	2.0	711	+1.4%

== Ward results ==
=== Barncroft ===
Barncroft
Party	Candidate	Votes	%	±%
Conservative	Yvonne Weeks	472	48.1	
Labour	Carl Roberts	282	28.7	
Liberal Democrats	Flora Ponsonby	228	23.2	
Majority		190	19.4	
Turnout		982	22.4	+3.5
Conservative gain from Labour		Swing		

=== Battins ===
Battins
Party	Candidate	Votes	%	±%
Conservative	Jane Rayner	386	36.6	
Labour	Paul Hansford	361	34.2	
Liberal Democrats	Susan Stocker	188	17.8	
Green	Louise Lumb	120	11.4	
Majority		25	2.4	
Turnout		1,055	21.9	+1.6
Conservative gain from Labour		Swing		

=== Bedhampton ===
Bedhampton
Party	Candidate	Votes	%	±%
Conservative	Kenneth Smith	1,254	42.9	+2.4
Liberal Democrats	Stephen Marshall	1,211	41.5	−1.2
Labour	Anne Edwards	276	9.5	+0.8
Green	Terry Mitchell	179	6.1	−2.1
Majority		43	1.4	
Turnout		2,920	42.0	+7.7
Conservative gain from Liberal Democrats		Swing		

=== Bondfields ===
Bondfields
Party	Candidate	Votes	%	±%
Labour	Terence Hart	555	49.0	
Conservative	Mary Brown	293	25.9	
Liberal Democrats	Cecil Sargent	285	25.2	
Majority		262	23.1	
Turnout		1,133	22.6	−1.0
Labour hold		Swing		

=== Cowplain ===
Cowplain
Party	Candidate	Votes	%	±%
Conservative	David Keast	1,598	62.3	+3.6
Liberal Democrats	John Jacobs	662	25.8	−5.2
Labour	Kenneth Monks	307	12.0	+1.7
Majority		936	36.5	+8.7
Turnout		2,567	35.6	+9.2
Conservative hold		Swing		

=== Emsworth ===
Emsworth
Party	Candidate	Votes	%	±%
Conservative	Brendan Gibb-Gray	2,207	60.3	+1.0
Liberal Democrats	John Cosslett	879	24.0	−5.2
Labour	William Gilchrist	362	9.9	−1.6
Green	Susan Dawes	214	5.8	+5.8
Majority		1,328	36.3	+6.2
Turnout		3,662	47.6	+8.6
Conservative hold		Swing		

=== Hart Plain ===
Hart Plain (2 seats)
Party	Candidate	Votes	%	±%
Liberal Democrats	Patricia Pearce	1,171		
Liberal Democrats	Sheila Troke	1,165		
Conservative	Leonard Shaw	977		
Conservative	Mark Masterton	945		
Labour	Ronald Hoyle	203		
Labour	William Wheeler	190		
Green	Barry Gleed	184		
Turnout		4,835	33.0	+9.4
Liberal Democrats hold		Swing		
Liberal Democrats hold		Swing		

=== Hayling East ===
Hayling East (2 seats)
Party	Candidate	Votes	%	±%
Conservative	Sheila Pearce	1,331		
Conservative	Charles Goulding	1,316		
Liberal Democrats	Margaret Causer	497		
Labour	John Mealy	396		
Labour	Sheila Mealy	363		
Liberal Democrats	Janis Shawashi	344		
Green	Ann Ansari	289		
Turnout		4,536	34.5	−2.0
Conservative hold		Swing		
Conservative hold		Swing		

=== Hayling West ===
Hayling West
Party	Candidate	Votes	%	±%
Conservative	Victor Pierce-Jones	1,737	64.0	−7.7
Liberal Democrats	Margaret Steentoft	446	16.4	+0.9
Labour	Graham Manning	311	11.5	−1.3
Green	Gillian Leek	222	8.2	+8.2
Majority		1,291	47.5	−8.7
Turnout		2,716	39.6	+6.0
Conservative hold		Swing		

=== Purbrook ===
Purbrook
Party	Candidate	Votes	%	±%
Conservative	David Farrow	1,255	49.0	−14.9
Independent	Pamela Cooper	711	27.8	+27.8
Labour	Nicola Potts	317	12.4	−7.4
Liberal Democrats	Pamela Welch	276	10.8	−5.6
Majority		544	21.3	−22.8
Turnout		2,559	35.3	+9.7
Conservative hold		Swing		

=== St. Faiths ===
St. Faiths
Party	Candidate	Votes	%	±%
Conservative	David Guest	1,659	54.2	+2.6
Liberal Democrats	Hugh Benzie	808	26.4	+4.7
Green	Timothy Dawes	329	10.7	−9.3
Labour	Rosemary Osborne	266	8.7	+2.0
Majority		851	27.8	−2.1
Turnout		3,062	44.5	+5.5
Conservative hold		Swing		

=== Stakes ===
Stakes
Party	Candidate	Votes	%	±%
Conservative	Nigel Tarrant	929	49.9	+1.8
Liberal Democrats	Christine Pylee	409	22.0	+4.0
Labour	Derek Smith	335	18.0	−15.9
Green	Stephen Carver	189	10.2	+10.2
Majority		520	27.9	+13.8
Turnout		1,862	25.0	+6.8
Conservative hold		Swing		

=== Warren Park ===
Warren Park
Party	Candidate	Votes	%	±%
Labour	Virginia Steel	319	40.1	
Conservative	Jacqueline Branson	270	34.0	
Liberal Democrats	Jennifer Moore-Blunt	206	25.9	
Majority		49	6.1	
Turnout		795	17.3	+2.7
Labour hold		Swing		

=== Waterloo ===
Waterloo
Party	Candidate	Votes	%	±%
Conservative	John Hunt	1,661	58.5	−10.9
Liberal Democrats	Valerie Hartridge	626	22.1	−8.5
Labour	Peter Benjamin	306	10.8	+10.8
Green	Jacqueline Turner	244	8.6	+8.6
Majority		1,035	36.5	−2.2
Turnout		2,837	37.9	+10.5
Conservative gain from Liberal Democrats		Swing		

== By-elections between 2004 and 2006 ==
Bedhampton By-election 24 February 2005
Party	Candidate	Votes	%	±%
Liberal Democrats		1,064	47.5	+6.0
Conservative		1,007	44.9	+2.0
Labour		136	6.1	−3.4
Green		34	1.5	−4.6
Majority		57	2.6	
Turnout		2,241	32.5	−9.5
Liberal Democrats hold		Swing		
