= 2007 Havant Borough Council election =

2007 UK local government election

← 2006	3 May 2007	2008 →

10 of 38 seats to Havant Borough Council 20 seats needed for a majority
	First party	Second party	Third party
Party	Conservative	Liberal Democrats	Labour
Seats before	30	4	4
Seats won	9	1	0
Seats after	31	3	4
Seat change	▲1	▼	Steady
Popular vote	14,660	5,949	1,621
- Results by Ward
Council control before election
Conservative
Council control after election
Conservative

The 2007 Havant Borough Council election took place on 3 May 2007 to elect members of Havant Borough Council in Hampshire, England. One third of the council was up for election and the Conservative Party stayed in overall control of the council.

After the election, the composition of the council was:

- Conservative 31
- Labour 4
- Liberal Democrats 3

== Background ==
Before the election the Conservatives had 30 councillors, while both the Labour Party and the Liberal Democrats had 4 seats. There was no election in the 4 Leigh Park wards in 2007 and as a result Labour was not defending any of their 4 seats on the council, while the Conservatives were defending 8 of the 10 seats that were contested.

== Election result ==
The Conservatives won 9 of the 10 seats contested, taking 1 seat from the Liberal Democrats. This took the Conservatives to 31 seats on the council, which the Conservative council leader David Gillett said he believed was "the largest Conservative majority on the south coast". The only seat not won by the Conservatives was in Bedhampton where the Liberal Democrats held on by a majority of 319 votes. Overall turnout at the elections was 35.2%.

Havant local election result 2007
Party	Seats	Gains	Losses	Net gain/loss	Seats %	Votes %	Votes	+/−
Conservative	9	1	0	+1	90.0	57.5	14,660	+3.7
Liberal Democrats	1	0	1	-1	10.0	23.3	5,949	-0.8
Labour	0	0	0	0	0.0	6.4	1,621	-6.9
Independent	0	0	0	0	0.0	5.7	1,454	+5.7
Green	0	0	0	0	0.0	4.2	1,079	-3.1
UKIP	0	0	0	0	0.0	2.1	523	+1.2
English Democrat	0	0	0	0	0.0	0.8	197	+0.2

== Ward results ==
=== Bedhampton ===
Bedhampton
Party	Candidate	Votes	%	±%
Liberal Democrats	Ann Buckley	1,351	48.3	+10.6
Conservative	Richard Galloway	1,032	36.9	−9.2
Labour	Anne Edwards	145	5.2	−1.0
English Democrat	George Herbert	120	4.3	−2.3
UKIP	Ray Finch	90	3.2	+3.2
Green	Karen Griffiths	60	2.1	−1.2
Majority		319	11.4	
Turnout		2,798	40.7	−0.9
Liberal Democrats hold		Swing		

=== Cowplain ===
Cowplain
Party	Candidate	Votes	%	±%
Conservative	Marjorie Smallcorn	1,708	74.5	+14.0
Liberal Democrats	Michael Bolt	401	17.5	−2.9
Labour	Kim Vassallo	184	8.0	+0.4
Majority		1,307	57.0	+16.9
Turnout		2,293	31.0	−0.2
Conservative hold		Swing		

=== Emsworth ===
Emsworth
Party	Candidate	Votes	%	±%
Conservative	Virginia Wilson-Smith	1,999	57.4	−1.8
Liberal Democrats	Hugh Benzie	834	24.0	−3.1
Labour	Barry Gardner	238	6.8	+0.6
Green	Ellie Dawes	218	6.3	−1.2
UKIP	Stephen Harris	193	5.5	+5.5
Majority		1,165	33.5	+1.4
Turnout		3,482	45.2	−0.6
Conservative hold		Swing		

=== Hart Plain ===
Hart Plain
Party	Candidate	Votes	%	±%
Conservative	Gerald Shimbart	1,216	58.5	+10.3
Liberal Democrats	John Jacobs	861	41.5	+2.5
Majority		355	17.1	+7.8
Turnout		2,077	28.2	−3.0
Conservative gain from Liberal Democrats		Swing		

=== Hayling East ===
Hayling East
Party	Candidate	Votes	%	±%
Conservative	Dave Collins	1,463	60.7	−2.4
Independent	Nigel Brown	491	20.4	+20.4
Liberal Democrats	Janis Shawashi	319	13.2	−0.4
Green	Ann Gleed	139	5.8	−3.7
Majority		972	40.3	−8.9
Turnout		2,412	33.7	−1.3
Conservative hold		Swing		

=== Hayling West ===
Hayling West
Party	Candidate	Votes	%	±%
Conservative	Andy Lenaghan	1,818	63.3	−4.8
Independent	Jim Phillips	550	19.2	+19.2
Liberal Democrats	Margaret Causer	254	8.8	−4.6
UKIP	Russell Thomas	127	4.4	+4.4
Green	Gill Leek	122	4.2	−4.8
Majority		1,268	44.2	−10.5
Turnout		2,871	42.0	+2.2
Conservative hold		Swing		

=== Purbrook ===
Purbrook
Party	Candidate	Votes	%	±%
Conservative	Hilary Farrow	1,216	54.3	−9.2
Independent	Steve Long	413	18.4	+18.4
Labour	Nicola Potts	252	11.2	−0.7
Liberal Democrats	Jennifer Moore-Blunt	219	9.8	−4.2
Green	Julie Blenkham	141	6.3	−4.2
Majority		803	35.8	−13.7
Turnout		2,241	31.2	−1.9
Conservative hold		Swing		

=== St Faiths ===
St Faiths
Party	Candidate	Votes	%	±%
Conservative	Ray Bolton	1,425	48.3	−4.2
Liberal Democrats	Ray Cobbett	900	30.5	+4.2
Labour	Ralph Cousins	229	7.8	−0.4
Green	Tim Dawes	207	7.0	−6.0
UKIP	Andrew Little	113	3.8	+3.8
English Democrat	Grant Greenham	77	2.6	+2.6
Majority		525	17.8	−8.4
Turnout		2,951	42.8	−0.9
Conservative hold		Swing		

=== Stakes ===
Stakes
Party	Candidate	Votes	%	±%
Conservative	Cyril Hilton	922	51.6	−2.4
Liberal Democrats	Ann Bazley	339	19.0	+3.0
Labour	Barry Steel	335	18.7	−0.3
Green	Wendy Smith	192	10.7	−0.3
Majority		583	32.6	−2.5
Turnout		1,788	24.1	−0.4
Conservative hold		Swing		

=== Waterloo ===
Waterloo
Party	Candidate	Votes	%	±%
Conservative	Paul Buckley	1,861	72.4	+5.5
Liberal Democrats	Jane Briggs	471	18.3	−2.6
Labour	William Gilchrist	238	9.3	−2.9
Majority		1,390	54.1	+8.1
Turnout		2,570	34.0	+0.1
Conservative hold		Swing		
