= 2003 Havant Borough Council election =

2003 UK local government election

← 2002	1 May 2003	2004 →

10 of 38 seats to Havant Borough Council 20 seats needed for a majority
	First party	Second party	Third party
Party	Conservative	Liberal Democrats	Labour
Seats before	23	9	6
Seats won	8	2	0
Seats after	23	8	7
Seat change	Steady	▲1	▼1
Popular vote	12,013	5,509	2,704
Percentage	56.6%	26.0%	12.7%
- Results by Ward
Council control before election
Conservative
Council control after election
Conservative

The 2003 Havant Borough Council election took place on 1 May 2003 to elect members of Havant Borough Council in Hampshire, England. One third of the council was up for election and the Conservative Party stayed in overall control of the council.

After the election, the composition of the council was:

- Conservative 23
- Labour 8
- Liberal Democrats 7

== Election result ==
The Conservative majority on the council was unchanged after they both gained and lost one seat.

Havant local election result 2003
Party	Seats	Gains	Losses	Net gain/loss	Seats %	Votes %	Votes	+/−
Conservative	8	1	1	0	80.0	56.6	12,013	+4.0
Liberal Democrats	2	1	0	+1	20.0	26.0	5,509	+1.9
Labour	0	0	1	-1	0.0	12.7	2,704	-7.0
Green	0	0	0	0	0.0	4.0	856	+0.8
Independent	0	0	0	0	0.0	0.6	136	+0.2

== Ward results ==
=== Bedhampton ===
Bedhampton
Party	Candidate	Votes	%	±%
Liberal Democrats	Anthony Welch	1,008	42.7	
Conservative	Kenneth Smith	957	40.5	
Labour	Carl Roberts	205	8.7	
Green	Terry Mitchell	193	8.2	
Majority		51	2.2	
Turnout		2,363	34.3	−6.6
Liberal Democrats hold		Swing		

=== Cowplain ===
Cowplain
Party	Candidate	Votes	%	±%
Conservative	Marjorie Smallcorn	1,117	58.7	
Liberal Democrats	Valerie Hartridge	589	31.0	
Labour	Kenneth Monks	196	10.3	
Majority		528	27.7	
Turnout		1,902	26.4	−1.5
Conservative hold		Swing		

=== Emsworth ===
Emsworth
Party	Candidate	Votes	%	±%
Conservative	Virginia Wilson-Smith	1,779	59.3	
Liberal Democrats	John Cosslett	876	29.2	
Labour	William Gilchrist	345	11.5	
Majority		903	30.1	
Turnout		3,000	39.0	−3.8
Conservative hold		Swing		

=== Hart Plain ===
Hart Plain
Party	Candidate	Votes	%	±%
Liberal Democrats	Dennis West	701	40.8	
Conservative	Leonard Shaw	685	39.8	
Labour	Howard Sherlock	197	11.5	
Independent	Kevin Ratcliffe	136	7.9	
Majority		16	1.0	
Turnout		1,719	23.6	−1.4
Liberal Democrats gain from Conservative		Swing		

=== Hayling East ===
Hayling East
Party	Candidate	Votes	%	±%
Conservative	David Collins	1,192	59.5	
Labour	Sheila Mealy	461	23.0	
Liberal Democrats	John Clouting	225	11.2	
Green	Frederick Gibson	127	6.3	
Majority		731	36.5	
Turnout		2,005	28.1	−4.7
Conservative hold		Swing		

=== Hayling West ===
Hayling West
Party	Candidate	Votes	%	±%
Conservative	Andy Lenaghan	1,655	71.7	
Liberal Democrats	Margaret Steentoft	358	15.5	
Labour	Michael Clarke	296	12.8	
Majority		1,297	56.2	
Turnout		2,309	33.6	−1.0
Conservative hold		Swing		

=== Purbrook ===
Purbrook
Party	Candidate	Votes	%	±%
Conservative	Hilary Farrow	1,180	63.9	
Labour	Nicolas Potts	365	19.8	
Liberal Democrats	Leslie Voice	303	16.4	
Majority		815	44.1	
Turnout		1,848	25.6	−5.2
Conservative hold		Swing		

=== St. Faiths ===
St. Faiths
Party	Candidate	Votes	%	±%
Conservative	Raymond Bolton	1,387	51.6	
Liberal Democrats	Hugh Benzie	583	21.7	
Green	Timothy Dawes	536	20.0	
Labour	Derek Smith	180	6.7	
Majority		804	29.9	
Turnout		2,686	39.0	−6.4
Conservative hold		Swing		

=== Stakes ===
Stakes
Party	Candidate	Votes	%	±%
Conservative	Cyril Hilton	650	48.1	
Labour	Margaret Beauvoisin	459	33.9	
Liberal Democrats	Bill Sargent	243	18.0	
Majority		191	14.2	
Turnout		1,352	18.2	−3.2
Conservative gain from Labour		Swing		

=== Waterloo ===
Waterloo
Party	Candidate	Votes	%	±%
Conservative	Kenneth Moss	1,411	69.4	
Liberal Democrats	Faith Ponsonby	623	30.6	
Majority		788	38.8	
Turnout		2,034	27.4	
Conservative hold		Swing		

== By-elections between 2003 and 2004 ==
Waterloo by-election 13 November 2003
Party	Candidate	Votes	%	±%
Conservative		1,083	65.5	−3.9
Liberal Democrats		401	24.3	−6.3
Labour		169	10.2	+10.2
Majority		682	41.3	+2.6
Turnout		1,653	22.3	−5.1
Conservative hold		Swing		
