= 2011 Havant Borough Council election =

2011 UK local government election

← 2010	5 May 2011	2012 →

10 of 38 seats to Havant Borough Council 20 seats needed for a majority
	First party	Second party	Third party
Party	Conservative	Labour	Liberal Democrats
Seats before	34	3	1
Seats won	10	0	0
Seats after	35	2	1
Seat change	▲1	Steady	▼1
Popular vote	18,430	5,127	4,602
- Results by Ward
Council control before election
Conservative
Council control after election
Conservative

The 2011 Havant Borough Council election took place on 5 May 2011 to elect members of Havant Borough Council in Hampshire, England. One third of the council was up for election and the Conservative Party stayed in overall control of the council.

After the election, the composition of the council was:

- Conservative 35
- Liberal Democrats 2
- Labour 1

== Background ==
A total of 42 candidates stood at the election for the 10 seats that were contested. The only non-Conservative councillor whose seat was up for election, Liberal Democrat Ann Buckley in Bedhampton ward, stood down at the election.

== Election result ==
The Conservatives won all 10 seats contested and therefore held 35 of the 38 seats on the council, while the Liberal Democrats dropped to 2 seats and Labour remained on 1 seat. The only change saw Conservative George Smith gained Bedhampton from the Liberal Democrats. The Liberal Democrats saw their share of the vote fall, which was blamed on the party's role in the national coalition government. Overall turnout was just over 42%, down from over 61% at the 2010 council election when it had been held at the same time as the general election.

Havant local election result 2011
Party	Seats	Gains	Losses	Net gain/loss	Seats %	Votes %	Votes	+/−
Conservative	10	1	0	+1	100.0	59.3	18,430	+9.2%
Labour	0	0	0	0	0	16.5	5,127	+0.5%
Liberal Democrats	0	0	1	-1	0	14.8	4,602	-13.4%
Green	0	0	0	0	0	5.5	1,710	+3.5%
UKIP	0	0	0	0	0	3.9	1,227	+0.6%

== Ward results ==
=== Bedhampton ===
Bedhampton
Party	Candidate	Votes	%	±%
Conservative	George Smith	1,390	45.4	−0.6
Liberal Democrats	Tony Welch	847	27.7	−3.3
Labour	Ralph Cousins	442	14.4	+1.9
UKIP	Stephen Harris	212	6.9	+1.1
Green	Terry Mitchell	168	5.5	+2.9
Majority		543	17.8	+2.8
Turnout		3,059	43.0	−23.4
Conservative gain from Liberal Democrats		Swing		

=== Cowplain ===
Cowplain
Party	Candidate	Votes	%	±%
Conservative	Majorie Smallcorn	1,928	65.4	+6.6
Labour	Ken Monks	449	15.2	+3.1
Liberal Democrats	John Jacobs	346	11.7	−17.4
Green	David Ludlam	226	7.7	+7.7
Majority		1,479	50.2	+20.5
Turnout		2,949	40.0	−29.4
Conservative hold		Swing		

=== Emsworth ===
Emsworth
Party	Candidate	Votes	%	±%
Conservative	Richard Galloway	2,418	58.7	+5.0
Liberal Democrats	Steve Marshall	558	13.5	−11.8
Labour	James Smith	531	12.9	+1.4
Green	Susan Kelly	363	8.8	+4.8
UKIP	Alex Spurge	252	6.1	+0.7
Majority		1,860	45.1	+16.6
Turnout		4,122	52.7	−21.7
Conservative hold		Swing		

=== Hart Plain ===
Hart Plain
Party	Candidate	Votes	%	±%
Conservative	Gerry Shimbart	1,694	58.9	+7.9
Labour	Francesca Trowse	597	20.7	+6.9
Liberal Democrats	Tamzan Crabb	587	20.4	−14.8
Majority		1,097	38.1	+22.3
Turnout		2,878	38.5	−26.0
Conservative hold		Swing		

=== Hayling East ===
Hayling East
Party	Candidate	Votes	%	±%
Conservative	Dave Collins	1,757	59.7	
Labour	Sheila Mealy	427	14.5	
UKIP	Gary Kerrin	329	11.2	
Liberal Democrats	Paul Pritchard	265	9.0	
Green	Helena Youle	164	5.6	
Majority		1,330	45.2	
Turnout		2,942	40.2	−25.9
Conservative hold		Swing		

=== Hayling West ===
Hayling West
Party	Candidate	Votes	%	±%
Conservative	Andy Lenaghan	2,213	67.6	+7.8
Labour	Jack Mealy	390	11.9	−1.2
Green	Sue Holt	237	7.2	+7.2
UKIP	Brenda Kerrin	223	6.8	−1.9
Liberal Democrats	Ann Brown	210	6.4	−12.0
Majority		1,823	55.7	+14.3
Turnout		3,273	47.4	−23.2
Conservative hold		Swing		

=== Purbrook ===
Purbrook
Party	Candidate	Votes	%	±%
Conservative	Hilary Farrow	1,731	61.8	+8.1
Labour	Lisa Wheeler	677	24.2	+5.5
Liberal Democrats	Tasha Harper	395	14.1	−13.5
Majority		1,054	37.6	+11.5
Turnout		2,803	38.6	−28.3
Conservative hold		Swing		

=== St Faiths ===
St Faiths
Party	Candidate	Votes	%	±%
Conservative	Ray Bolton	1,819	53.6	+4.1
Labour	Oliver Edwards	560	16.5	+4.9
Liberal Democrats	Jane Briggs	513	15.1	−16.1
Green	Tim Dawes	293	8.6	+0.9
UKIP	Ray Finch	211	6.2	+6.2
Majority		1,259	37.1	+18.8
Turnout		3,396	47.8	−23.8
Conservative hold		Swing		

=== Stakes ===
Stakes
Party	Candidate	Votes	%	±%
Conservative	Cyril Hilton	1,264	53.6	+4.5
Labour	David Potts	653	27.7	+6.3
Liberal Democrats	Ann Bazley	441	18.7	−10.7
Majority		611	25.9	+6.2
Turnout		2,358	31.9	−27.1
Conservative hold		Swing		

=== Waterloo ===
Waterloo
Party	Candidate	Votes	%	±%
Conservative	Paul Buckley	2,216	66.8	+11.0
Liberal Democrats	Fred Dunford	440	13.3	−18.1
Labour	Diana Nottingham	401	12.1	+3.2
Green	Richard Jannaway	259	7.8	+3.9
Majority		1,776	53.6	+29.2
Turnout		3,316	43.0	−26.1
Conservative hold		Swing		
