= 2006 Havant Borough Council election =

2006 UK local government election

← 2004	4 May 2006	2007 →

14 of 38 seats to Havant Borough Council 20 seats needed for a majority
	First party	Second party	Third party
Party	Conservative	Labour	Liberal Democrats
Seats before	28	5	6
Seats won	11	1	2
Seats after	30	4	4
Seat change	▲2	Steady	▼2
Popular vote	16,178	7,234	3,989
- Results by Ward
Council control before election
Conservative
Council control after election
Conservative

The 2006 Havant Borough Council election took place on 4 May 2006 to elect members of Havant Borough Council in Hampshire, England. One third of the council was up for election and the Conservative Party stayed in overall control of the council.

After the election, the composition of the council was:

- Conservative 30
- Labour 4
- Liberal Democrats 4

== Background ==
After the last election in 2004 the Conservatives had 27 seats, compared to 6 for Labour and 5 for the Liberal Democrats. However, in 2005 a Liberal Democrat councillor for Hart Plain, Ron Purkis, defected to the Conservatives.

== Election result ==
The Conservatives increased their majority on the council to hold 30 of the 38 seats on the council after getting a swing in their favour. Labour lost 2 seats in Leigh Park, with sitting councillors Ralph Cousins and Barry Gardner losing to the Conservatives and Liberal Democrats respectively. Overall turnout at the election was 33.5%.

Following the election Conservative David Gillett remained as leader of the council after surviving a leadership challenge within the Conservative group from David Guest by 4 votes.

Havant local election result 2006
Party	Seats	Gains	Losses	Net gain/loss	Seats %	Votes %	Votes	+/−
Conservative	11	2	0	+2	78.6	53.8	16,178	+2.3%
Liberal Democrats	1	1	1	0	7.1	24.1	7,234	-2.4%
Labour	2	0	2	-2	14.3	13.3	3,989	-1.2%
Green	0	0	0	0	0	7.3	2,187	+1.8%
UKIP	0	0	0	0	0	0.9	272	+0.9%
English Democrat	0	0	0	0	0	0.6	190	+0.6%

== Ward results ==
=== Barncroft ===
Barncroft
Party	Candidate	Votes	%	±%
Conservative	George Fairhurst	465	44.0	−4.1
Labour	Ralph Cousins	284	26.9	−1.8
UKIP	Stephen Harris	164	15.5	+15.5
Liberal Democrats	Michael Ponsonby	143	13.5	−9.7
Majority		181	17.1	−2.2
Turnout		1,056	24.8	+2.4
Conservative gain from Labour		Swing		

=== Battins ===
Battins
Party	Candidate	Votes	%	±%
Labour	June Hanan	346	31.9	−2.3
Liberal Democrats	Raymond Cobbett	328	30.2	+12.4
Conservative	Ronald Purkis	275	25.3	−11.3
Green	Louise Palmer	136	12.5	+1.1
Majority		18	1.7	
Turnout		1,085	23.1	+1.2
Labour hold		Swing		

=== Bedhampton ===
Bedhampton
Party	Candidate	Votes	%	±%
Conservative	Jennifer Wride	1,321	46.1	+3.2
Liberal Democrats	Faith Ponsonby	1,081	37.7	−3.8
English Democrat	George Herbert	190	6.6	+6.6
Labour	Anne Edwards	178	6.2	−3.3
Green	Terry Mitchell	96	3.3	−2.8
Majority		240	8.4	+6.9
Turnout		2,866	41.6	−0.4
Conservative gain from Liberal Democrats		Swing		

=== Bondfields ===
Bondfields
Party	Candidate	Votes	%	±%
Liberal Democrats	Susan Stocker	608	46.2	+21.0
Labour	Barry Gardner	479	36.4	−12.6
Conservative	Thelma Carpenter	228	17.3	−8.6
Majority		129	9.8	
Turnout		1,315	27.2	+4.6
Liberal Democrats gain from Labour		Swing		

=== Cowplain ===
Cowplain
Party	Candidate	Votes	%	±%
Conservative	Anthony Briggs	1,359	60.5	−1.8
Liberal Democrats	John Jacobs	458	20.4	−5.4
Green	Ann Gleed	259	11.5	+11.5
Labour	Kenneth Monks	170	7.6	−4.4
Majority		901	40.1	+3.6
Turnout		2,246	31.2	−4.4
Conservative hold		Swing		

=== Emsworth ===
Emsworth
Party	Candidate	Votes	%	±%
Conservative	David Gillett	2,071	59.2	−1.1
Liberal Democrats	Hugh Benzie	949	27.1	+3.1
Green	Mary Youle	262	7.5	+1.7
Labour	Derek Smith	218	6.2	−3.7
Majority		1,122	32.1	−4.2
Turnout		3,500	45.8	−1.8
Conservative hold		Swing		

=== Hart Plain ===
Hart Plain
Party	Candidate	Votes	%	±%
Conservative	Michael Cheshire	1,089	48.2	
Liberal Democrats	Ann Bazley	880	39.0	
Labour	Kim Vassallo	170	7.5	
Green	Barry Gleed	119	5.3	
Majority		209	9.2	
Turnout		2,258	31.2	−1.8
Conservative hold		Swing		

=== Hayling East ===
Hayling East
Party	Candidate	Votes	%	±%
Conservative	John Smith	1,567	63.1	
Labour	Sheila Mealy	344	13.8	
Liberal Democrats	Margaret Causer	337	13.6	
Green	Gillian Leek	236	9.5	
Majority		1,223	49.3	
Turnout		2,484	35.0	+0.5
Conservative hold		Swing		

=== Hayling West ===
Hayling West
Party	Candidate	Votes	%	±%
Conservative	Francis Pearce	1,848	68.1	+4.1
Liberal Democrats	Janis Shawashi	364	13.4	−3.0
Labour	Colin Blunden	260	9.6	−1.9
Green	Susan Dawes	243	9.0	+0.8
Majority		1,484	54.7	+7.2
Turnout		2,715	39.8	+0.2
Conservative hold		Swing		

=== Purbrook ===
Purbrook
Party	Candidate	Votes	%	±%
Conservative	Gwen Blackett	1,507	63.5	+14.5
Liberal Democrats	Stephen Marshall	332	14.0	+3.2
Labour	Nicola Potts	283	11.9	−0.5
Green	Julie Blenkharn	250	10.5	+10.5
Majority		1,175	49.5	+28.2
Turnout		2,372	33.1	−2.2
Conservative hold		Swing		

=== St Faiths ===
St Faiths
Party	Candidate	Votes	%	±%
Conservative	Jacqueline Branson	1,574	52.5	−1.7
Liberal Democrats	Jane Briggs	789	26.3	−0.1
Green	Timothy Dawes	391	13.0	+2.3
Labour	Frederick Barnes	245	8.2	−0.5
Majority		785	26.2	−1.6
Turnout		2,999	43.7	−0.8
Conservative hold		Swing		

=== Stakes ===
Stakes
Party	Candidate	Votes	%	±%
Conservative	Olwyn Kennedy	955	54.0	+4.1
Labour	Barry Steel	335	19.0	+1.0
Liberal Democrats	Susan Pook	282	16.0	−6.0
Green	Wendy Smith	195	11.0	+0.8
Majority		620	35.1	+7.2
Turnout		1,767	24.5	−0.5
Conservative hold		Swing		

=== Warren Park ===
Warren Park
Party	Candidate	Votes	%	±%
Labour	Richard Brown	369	42.4	+2.3
Conservative	Richard Galloway	236	27.1	−6.9
Liberal Democrats	Jennifer Moore-Blunt	158	18.1	−7.8
UKIP	Brian Hines	108	12.4	+12.4
Majority		133	15.3	+9.1
Turnout		871	19.6	+2.3
Labour hold		Swing		

=== Waterloo ===
Waterloo
Party	Candidate	Votes	%	±%
Conservative	Wendy Brown	1,683	66.9	+8.4
Liberal Democrats	Michael Bolt	525	20.9	−1.2
Labour	Margaret Beauvoison	308	12.2	+1.4
Majority		1,158	46.0	+9.5
Turnout		2,516	33.9	−4.0
Conservative hold		Swing		

== By-elections between 2006 and 2007 ==
=== Battins ===
A by-election was held in Battins ward on 2 November 2006 after the death of Conservative councillor Jane Rayner. The seat was gained for the Liberal Democrats by Faith Ponsonby with a majority of 137 votes.

Battins by-election 2 November 2006
Party	Candidate	Votes	%	±%
Liberal Democrats	Faith Ponsonby	401	41.9	+11.7
Conservative	Wendy Osgood	264	27.6	+2.3
Labour	Ralph Cousins	236	24.7	−7.2
Green	Louise Palmer	55	5.8	−6.7
Majority		137	14.3	
Turnout		956	20.3	−2.8
Liberal Democrats gain from Conservative		Swing		

=== Hart Plain ===
A by-election was held in Hart Plain ward on 30 November 2006 after Liberal Democrat councillor Tricia Pearce resigned from the council. Conservative Elaine Shimbart gained the seat from the Liberal Democrats by a majority of 246 votes.

Hart Plain by-election 30 November 2006
Party	Candidate	Votes	%	±%
Conservative	Elaine Shimbart	839	55.3	+7.1
Liberal Democrats	John Jacobs	593	39.1	+0.1
Labour	Kenneth Monks	84	5.6	−1.9
Majority		246	16.2	+6.9
Turnout		1,516	21.8	−9.4
Conservative gain from Liberal Democrats		Swing		
