= 2010 Havant Borough Council election =

2010 UK local government election

← 2008	6 May 2010	2011 →

15 of 38 seats to Havant Borough Council 20 seats needed for a majority
	First party	Second party	Third party
Party	Conservative	Liberal Democrats	Labour
Seats before	32	3	3
Seats won	14	1	0
Seats after	34	3	1
Seat change	▲2	Steady	▼2
Popular vote	31,512	17,745	10,064
- Results by Ward
Council control before election
Conservative
Council control after election
Conservative

The 2010 Havant Borough Council election took place on 6 May 2010 to elect members of Havant Borough Council in Hampshire, England. One third of the council was up for election and the Conservative Party stayed in overall control of the council.

After the election, the composition of the council was:

- Conservative 34
- Liberal Democrats 3
- Labour 1

== Background ==
Before the election the Conservatives had 32 seats on the council, compared to 3 each for Labour and the Liberal Democrats. Among those defending seats at the election were the Conservative leader of the council Tony Briggs in Cowplain ward and the Labour group leader Richard Brown in Warren Park.

== Election result ==
The Conservatives increased their majority on the council after gaining two seats, one each from Labour and the Liberal Democrats. The Conservative gain from Labour came in Warren Park, where they defeated the Labour group leader Richard Brown, while the Liberal Democrat defeat was in Bondfields, where the Conservative winner Frida Edwards became the first black councillor in Havant. Meanwhile, the Liberal Democrats gained a seat from Labour in Battins, where Labour's June Hanan had stood down at the election, and the new Liberal Democrat councillor Katie Ray became the youngest ever councillor in Havant at the age of 20. The council election took place at the same time as the 2010 general election, with the Conservative Member of parliament for Havant, David Willetts, doubling his majority.

Havant local election result 2010
Party	Seats	Gains	Losses	Net gain/loss	Seats %	Votes %	Votes	+/−
Conservative	14	2	0	+2	93.3	50.1	31,512	-7.9%
Liberal Democrats	1	1	1	0	6.7	28.2	17,745	+4.7%
Labour	0	0	2	-2	0	16.0	10,064	+5.0%
UKIP	0	0	0	0	0	3.3	2,064	-2.0%
Green	0	0	0	0	0	2.0	1,268	+0.7%
English Democrat	0	0	0	0	0	0.5	290	-0.4%

== Ward results ==
=== Barncroft ===
Barncroft
Party	Candidate	Votes	%	±%
Conservative	Mike Fairhurst	945	42.5	−12.2
Labour	Anne Edwards	592	26.6	+8.8
Liberal Democrats	Michael Ponsonby	478	21.5	+7.9
UKIP	Ray Finch	211	9.5	−4.4
Majority		353	15.9	−21.0
Turnout		2,226	50.6	+26.4
Conservative hold		Swing		

=== Battins ===
Battins
Party	Candidate	Votes	%	±%
Liberal Democrats	Katie Ray	912	38.3	−8.1
Conservative	Liz Fairhurst	816	34.3	+10.0
Labour	Lynne Phillips	651	27.4	+10.9
Majority		96	4.0	−18.2
Turnout		2,379	49.3	+24.4
Liberal Democrats gain from Labour		Swing		

=== Bedhampton ===
Bedhampton
Party	Candidate	Votes	%	±%
Conservative	Jenny Wride	2,166	46.0	−1.1
Liberal Democrats	Jane Briggs	1,460	31.0	−4.0
Labour	Oliver Edwards	589	12.5	+5.9
UKIP	Steve Harris	271	5.8	+1.5
Green	Terry Mitchell	121	2.6	+2.6
English Democrat	George Herbert	100	2.1	−5.0
Majority		706	15.0	+2.9
Turnout		4,707	66.4	+29.6
Conservative hold		Swing		

=== Bondfields ===
Bondfields
Party	Candidate	Votes	%	±%
Conservative	Frida Edwards	882	34.1	+6.5
Liberal Democrats	Steve Marshall	845	32.7	+10.4
Labour	Ralph Cousins	669	25.9	−7.5
English Democrat	Grant Greenham	190	7.3	+1.1
Majority		37	1.4	
Turnout		2,586	52.2	+29.1
Conservative gain from Liberal Democrats		Swing		

=== Cowplain ===
Cowplain
Party	Candidate	Votes	%	±%
Conservative	Tony Briggs	2,993	58.8	−12.9
Liberal Democrats	Tamzan Crabb	1,483	29.1	+7.5
Labour	Ken Monks	616	12.1	+5.3
Majority		1,510	29.7	−20.4
Turnout		5,092	69.4	+38.0
Conservative hold		Swing		

=== Emsworth ===
Emsworth
Party	Candidate	Votes	%	±%
Conservative	David Gillett	3,124	53.7	−12.4
Liberal Democrats	Roisin Miller	1,470	25.3	+5.1
Labour	Ken Gilchrist	669	11.5	+3.9
UKIP	Ian Reddoch	315	5.4	−0.6
Green	Wendy Smith	235	4.0	+4.0
Majority		1,654	28.5	−17.4
Turnout		5,813	74.4	+30.5
Conservative hold		Swing		

=== Hart Plain ===
Hart Plain
Party	Candidate	Votes	%	±%
Conservative	Mike Cheshire	2,424	51.0	−10.6
Liberal Democrats	Rodney Crawford	1,671	35.2	+5.7
Labour	Howard Sherlock	657	13.8	+5.0
Majority		753	15.8	−16.3
Turnout		4,752	64.5	+33.6
Conservative hold		Swing		

=== Hayling East ===
Hayling East (2 seats)
Party	Candidate	Votes	%	±%
Conservative	John Smith	2,272		
Conservative	Leah Turner	2,027		
Liberal Democrats	Paul Pritchard	1,116		
Liberal Democrats	Angela Armstrong	929		
Labour	Sheila Mealy	715		
Labour	John Laxton	695		
UKIP	Gary Kerrin	689		
Green	Helena Youle	313		
Turnout		8,756	66.1	+33.5
Conservative hold		Swing		
Conservative hold		Swing		

=== Hayling West ===
Hayling West
Party	Candidate	Votes	%	±%
Conservative	Michael Wilson	2,913	59.8	−8.8
Liberal Democrats	Ann Brown	898	18.4	+1.7
Labour	Susan Underwood	636	13.1	+6.4
UKIP	Brenda Kerrin	424	8.7	+0.8
Majority		2,015	41.4	−10.5
Turnout		4,871	70.6	+31.8
Conservative hold		Swing		

=== Purbrook ===
Purbrook
Party	Candidate	Votes	%	±%
Conservative	Gwendoline Blackett	2,596	53.7	−12.5
Liberal Democrats	Sue Pook	1,335	27.6	+15.0
Labour	Lisa Wheeler	907	18.7	+6.1
Majority		1,261	26.1	−27.5
Turnout		4,838	66.9	+35.9
Conservative hold		Swing		

=== St Faiths ===
St Faiths
Party	Candidate	Votes	%	±%
Conservative	Jackie Branson	2,530	49.5	+3.6
Liberal Democrats	Peter Corrigan	1,593	31.2	−0.7
Labour	James Smith	591	11.6	+4.0
Green	Tim Dawes	394	7.7	+0.9
Majority		937	18.3	+4.3
Turnout		5,108	71.6	+31.1
Conservative hold		Swing		

=== Stakes ===
Stakes
Party	Candidate	Votes	%	±%
Conservative	Olly Kennedy	2,150	49.1	−13.6
Liberal Democrats	Ann Bazley	1,289	29.4	+8.8
Labour	Robin Matthews	938	21.4	+4.7
Majority		861	19.7	−22.3
Turnout		4,377	59.0	+35.2
Conservative hold		Swing		

=== Warren Park ===
Warren Park
Party	Candidate	Votes	%	±%
Conservative	Mark Johnson	752	34.2	−1.9
Labour	Richard Brown	673	30.6	+9.9
Liberal Democrats	Christopher Maple	620	28.2	−5.8
UKIP	Steve Little	154	7.0	−2.2
Majority		79	3.6	+1.5
Turnout		2,199	44.3	+20.8
Conservative gain from Labour		Swing		

=== Waterloo ===
Waterloo
Party	Candidate	Votes	%	±%
Conservative	Ray Bastin	2,922	55.8	−14.4
Liberal Democrats	Fred Dunford	1,646	31.4	+12.1
Labour	Edward Miller	466	8.9	−1.6
Green	Richard Jannaway	205	3.9	+3.9
Majority		1,276	24.4	−26.5
Turnout		5,239	69.1	+35.0
Conservative hold		Swing		
