= 2015 Havant Borough Council election =

2015 UK local government election

- 7 May 2015

10 of 38 seats to Havant Borough Council 20 seats needed for a majority
| | First party | Second party |
|---|---|---|
| Party | Conservative | UKIP |
| Seats before | 31 | 2 |
| Seats won | 10 | 0 |
| Seats after | 31 | 2 |
| Seat change | Steady | Steady |
| Popular vote | 25,879 | 10,194 |
| | Third party | Fourth party |
| Party | Labour | Liberal Democrats |
| Seats before | 4 | 1 |
| Seats won | 0 | 0 |
| Seats after | 4 | 1 |
| Seat change | Steady | Steady |
| Popular vote | 6,323 | 4,119 |
- Results by Ward
Council control before election
Conservative
Council control after election
Conservative

The 2015 Havant Borough Council election took place on 7 May 2015 to elect members of the Havant Borough Council in England. It was held on the same day as other local elections.

After the election, the composition of the council was:

- Conservative: 31
- Labour: 4
- UKIP: 2
- Liberal Democrats: 1

== Election result ==
With 51% of the vote, the Conservatives won all seats up for election this year, which all had incumbent Conservative councillors. As such, the composition of the council did not change in the course of the election.

Havant local election result 2015
| Party | Seats | Gains | Losses | Net gain/loss | Seats % | Votes % | Votes | +/− |
|---|---|---|---|---|---|---|---|---|
| Conservative | 10 | 0 | 0 | Steady | 100.0 | 51.0 | 25,879 | |
| UKIP | 0 | 0 | 0 | Steady | 0.0 | 20.1 | 10,194 | |
| Labour | 0 | 0 | 0 | Steady | 0.0 | 12.5 | 6,323 | |
| Liberal Democrats | 0 | 0 | 0 | Steady | 0.0 | 8.1 | 4,119 | |
| Green | 0 | 0 | 0 | Steady | 0.0 | 7.3 | 3,723 | |
| Independent | 0 | 0 | 0 | Steady | 0.0 | 0.9 | 472 | |

== Ward results ==
=== Bedhampton ===
Bedhampton
| Party | Candidate | Votes | % | ±% |
|---|---|---|---|---|
| Conservative | Edward Rees | 2,339 | 49.2 | |
| UKIP | Philip Melhuish | 935 | 19.7 | |
| Liberal Democrats | Margaret Brown | 595 | 12.5 | |
| Labour | Munazza Faiz | 545 | 11.5 | |
| Green | Terry Mitchell | 340 | 7.2 | |
| Majority | | 1,404 | | |
| Turnout | | 4,754 | | |
| Conservative hold | | Swing | | |

=== Cowplain ===
Cowplain
| Party | Candidate | Votes | % | ±% |
|---|---|---|---|---|
| Conservative | Narinder Kaur Bains | 2,367 | 47.6 | |
| UKIP | Andrew Boxall | 1,029 | 20.5 | |
| Labour | Kenneth Monks | 545 | 11.0 | |
| Independent | Marjorie Smallcorn | 472 | 9.5 | |
| Liberal Democrats | John Jacobs | 332 | 6.7 | |
| Green | Bruce Holman | 240 | 4.8 | |
| Majority | | 1,348 | | |
| Turnout | | 4,975 | | |
| Conservative hold | | Swing | | |

=== Emsworth ===
Emsworth
| Party | Candidate | Votes | % | ±% |
|---|---|---|---|---|
| Conservative | Rivka Cresswell | 3,071 | 50.5 | |
| UKIP | Alexander Spurge | 905 | 14.9 | |
| Labour | John Wheaton | 727 | 12.0 | |
| Green | Victoria Gould | 707 | 11.6 | |
| Liberal Democrats | Christopher Maple | 669 | 11.0 | |
| Majority | | 2,166 | | |
| Turnout | | 6,079 | | |
| Conservative hold | | Swing | | |

=== Hart Plain ===
Hart Plain
| Party | Candidate | Votes | % | ±% |
|---|---|---|---|---|
| Conservative | Gerald Shimbart | 2,541 | 52.4 | |
| UKIP | Tabitha Smith | 1,092 | 22.5 | |
| Labour | Paul Dreczko | 649 | 13.4 | |
| Liberal Democrats | Michael Bolt | 334 | 6.9 | |
| Green | Susan Dawes | 230 | 4.7 | |
| Majority | | 1,449 | | |
| Turnout | | 4,846 | | |
| Conservative hold | | Swing | | |

=== Hayling East ===
Hayling East
| Party | Candidate | Votes | % | ±% |
|---|---|---|---|---|
| Conservative | Clare Satchwell | 2,488 | 50.4 | |
| UKIP | Richard Coates | 1,321 | 26.7 | |
| Labour | Susan Underwood | 598 | 12.1 | |
| Liberal Democrats | Anne Martin | 270 | 5.5 | |
| Green | Paul Valentine | 262 | 5.3 | |
| Majority | | 1,167 | | |
| Turnout | | 4,939 | | |
| Conservative hold | | Swing | | |

=== Hayling West ===
Hayling West
| Party | Candidate | Votes | % | ±% |
|---|---|---|---|---|
| Conservative | Andrew Lenaghan | 3,024 | 60.5 | |
| UKIP | Wendy Coates | 852 | 17.0 | |
| Labour | Alfred Underwood | 523 | 10.5 | |
| Liberal Democrats | Paul Gray | 318 | 6.4 | |
| Green | Susan Holt | 282 | 5.6 | |
| Majority | | 2,172 | | |
| Turnout | | 4,999 | | |
| Conservative hold | | Swing | | |

=== Purbrook ===
Purbrook
| Party | Candidate | Votes | % | ±% |
|---|---|---|---|---|
| Conservative | Gary Hughes | 2,661 | 53.1 | |
| UKIP | Anthony Gundry | 1,060 | 21.1 | |
| Labour | Anthony Berry | 668 | 13.3 | |
| Green | Rosemarie Blackburn | 319 | 6.4 | |
| Liberal Democrats | Hilary Bolt | 308 | 6.1 | |
| Majority | | 1,601 | | |
| Turnout | | 5,016 | | |
| Conservative hold | | Swing | | |

=== St Faith's ===
St. Faith's
| Party | Candidate | Votes | % | ±% |
|---|---|---|---|---|
| Conservative | Andrew Pike | 2,401 | 45.6 | |
| Green | Timothy Dawes | 1,148 | 21.8 | |
| UKIP | John Davis | 775 | 14.7 | |
| Labour | Philip Munday | 569 | 10.8 | |
| Liberal Democrats | Jane Briggs | 376 | 7.1 | |
| Majority | | 1,253 | | |
| Turnout | | 5,269 | | |
| Conservative hold | | Swing | | |

=== Stakes ===
Stakes
| Party | Candidate | Votes | % | ±% |
|---|---|---|---|---|
| Conservative | Diana Patrick | 1,955 | 44.0 | |
| UKIP | Carole Newnham | 1,101 | 24.8 | |
| Labour | Philip Pearson | 786 | 17.7 | |
| Liberal Democrats | Ann Bazley | 406 | 9.1 | |
| Green | Lewis Martin | 195 | 4.4 | |
| Majority | | 854 | | |
| Turnout | | 4,443 | | |
| Conservative hold | | Swing | | |

=== Waterloo ===
Waterloo
| Party | Candidate | Votes | % | ±% |
|---|---|---|---|---|
| Conservative | Paul Buckley | 3,032 | 56.3 | |
| UKIP | Tom Davies | 1,134 | 21.0 | |
| Labour | Paul Fencott | 713 | 13.2 | |
| Liberal Democrats | Frederick Dunford | 511 | 9.5 | |
| Majority | | 1,898 | | |
| Turnout | | 5,390 | | |
| Conservative hold | | Swing | | |

== By-elections between 2015 and 2016 ==
=== Bondfields ===
A by-election took place in Bondfields ward on 3 March 2016 after the death of Frida Edwards.

Bondfields by-election 3 March 2016
| Party | Candidate | Votes | % | ±% |
|---|---|---|---|---|
| Conservative | Lance Quantrill | 207 | 30.2 | −3.4 |
| Liberal Democrats | Catherine Billam | 187 | 27.3 | +27.3 |
| Labour | Tony Berry | 148 | 21.6 | −6.9 |
| UKIP | Geoff Whiffen | 143 | 20.9 | +20.9 |
| Majority | | 20 | 2.9 | |
| Turnout | | 685 | | |
| Conservative hold | | Swing | | |
