= 2019 Havant Borough Council election =

2019 UK local government election

- 2 May 2019

11 of 38 seats to Havant Borough Council 20 seats needed for a majority
	First party	Second party
Party	Conservative	Labour
Seats before	33	2
Seats won	11	0
Seats after	33	2
	Third party	Fourth party
Party	UKIP	Liberal Democrats
Seats before	2	1
Seats won	0	0
Seats after	2	1
- Results by ward
Council control before election
Conservative
Council control after election
Conservative

The 2019 Havant Borough Council election took place on 2 May 2019 to elect members of Havant Borough Council in England. This was on the same day as other local elections.

After the election, the composition of the council was:

- Conservatives: 33
- Labour: 2
- UKIP: 2
- Liberal Democrats: 1

== Results ==
The Conservatives successfully defended all 11 seats up for election this year, with the Council composition remaining the same. However, the vote share for both the Conservatives and Labour fell, whilst the UKIP, Liberal Democrats, and Green vote share rose.

The table below only tallies the votes of the highest polling candidate for each party within each ward. This is known as the top candidate method and is often used for multi-member plurality elections.

Havant local election result 2019
Party	Seats	Gains	Losses	Net gain/loss	Seats %	Votes %	Votes	+/−
Conservative	11	0	0	Steady	100	43.22	10,311	▼18.02
UKIP	0	0	0	Steady	0	20.69	4,937	▲18.5
Liberal Democrats	0	0	0	Steady	0	18.91	4,512	▲3.87
Labour	0	0	0	Steady	0	10.81	2,579	▼7.61
Green	0	0	0	Steady	0	6.35	1,515	▲3.28

== Ward results ==
=== Bedhampton ===
Bedhampton
Party	Candidate	Votes	%	±%
Conservative	Mark Inkster	832	38.13	
Liberal Democrats	Philippa Gray	731	33.50	
UKIP	Graham Stouse	410	18.79	
Labour	Freya Savidge-Conway	209	9.57	
Majority		101		
Turnout		2,182	29.39	
Conservative hold		Swing		

=== Cowplain ===
Cowplain
Party	Candidate	Votes	%	±%
Conservative	Narinder Bains	956	47.60	
UKIP	Jason Gillen	438	21.81	
Liberal Democrats	Lisa Jackson	324	16.13	
Green	Bruce Holman	289	14.39	
Majority		23.73		
Turnout		2,008	27.41	
Conservative hold		Swing		

=== Emsworth ===
Emsworth
Party	Candidate	Votes	%	±%
Conservative	Julie Thain-Smith	1,335	41.33	
Liberal Democrats	Jane Briggs	781	24.17	
Green	Georgina-Kate Adams	498	15.41	
Labour	Paula Elsey	322	9.96	
UKIP	Patricia Farnham	294	9.10	
Majority		554		
Turnout		3,230	40.08	
Conservative hold		Swing		

=== Hart Plain ===
Hart Plain
Party	Candidate	Votes	%	±%
Conservative	David Jenner	909	42.99	
UKIP	Roger Johnson	589	27.86	
Labour	Howard Sherlock	226	10.69	
Liberal Democrats	Suzette Gray	196	9.27	
Green	John Colman	194	9.17	
Majority		320	15.13	
Turnout		2,114	27.86	
Conservative hold		Swing		

=== Hayling East ===
Hayling East
Party	Candidate	Votes	%	±%
Conservative	Michael Wilson	1,137	43.44	
UKIP	Christopher Littlewood	635	24.26	
Liberal Democrats	Wilf Forrow	419	16.01	
Green	Natasha Green	244	9.32	
Labour	Jez Cole	182	6.95	
Majority		592	22.62	
Turnout		2,617	35.00	
Conservative hold		Swing		

=== Hayling West ===
Hayling West
Party	Candidate	Votes	%	±%
Conservative	Clare Satchwell	1,273	44.79	
UKIP	John Perry	733	25.79	
Liberal Democrats	Paul Gray	570	20.05	
Labour	Sheree Earnshaw	266	9.35	
Majority		540	40.9	
Turnout		2,842	40.9	
Conservative hold		Swing		

=== Purbrook ===
Purbrook (2)
Party	Candidate	Votes	%	±%
Conservative	Gary Hughes	1,003	46.74	
Conservative	Husky Patel	762	35.51	
UKIP	Peter Brierley	466	21.71	
UKIP	Allan Darby	373	17.38	
Liberal Democrats	Antonia Harrison	319	14.86	
Green	Rosie Blackburn	290	13.51	
Liberal Democrats	Paul Tansom	277	12.91	
Labour	Munazza Faiz	268	12.49	
Labour	Simon Hagan	243	11.32	
Turnout		2,146	28.56	
Conservative hold		Swing		
Conservative hold		Swing		

=== St Faiths ===
St. Faiths
Party	Candidate	Votes	%	±%
Conservative	Tim Pike	1,172	44.01	
Liberal Democrats	Catherine Billam	545	20.46	
UKIP	Sharon Collings	496	18.62	
Labour	Simon Cattermole	450	16.89	
Majority		627	23.54	
Turnout		2,663	34.36	
Conservative hold		Swing		

=== Stakes ===
Stakes
Party	Candidate	Votes	%	±%
Conservative	Diana Patrick	720	42.98	
Labour	Rosamund Knight	388	23.16	
UKIP	Matthew Travis	371	22.14	
Liberal Democrats	Alun Williams	196	11.70	
Majority		332	19.82	
Turnout		1,675	21.93	
Conservative hold		Swing		

=== Waterloo ===
Waterloo
Party	Candidate	Votes	%	±%
Conservative	Gwen Robinson	1,215	50.22	
UKIP	Soraya Wilson	505	20.87	
Liberal Democrats	John Pratley	431	17.81	
Labour	Tony Berry	268	11.07	
Majority		710	29.35	
Turnout		2,419	29.87	
Conservative hold		Swing		
