= 2000 Havant Borough Council election =

2000 UK local government election

The 2000 Havant Borough Council election took place on 4 May 2000 to elect members of Havant Borough Council in Hampshire, England. One third of the council was up for election and the council stayed under no overall control.

After the election, the composition of the council was:

- Conservative 20
- Labour 11
- Liberal Democrats 8
- Independent 3

== Election result ==
Overall turnout at the election was 26.5%.

Havant local election result 2000
Party	Seats	Gains	Losses	Net gain/loss	Seats %	Votes %	Votes	+/−
Conservative	8	4	0	+4	57.1	50.2	12,194	
Labour	3	2	1	+1	21.4	15.9	3,866	
Liberal Democrats	2	1	4	-3	14.3	29.3	7,130	
Independent	1	0	0	0	7.1	4.4	1,068	
Independent Labour	0	0	2	-2	0	0.2	57	

== Ward results ==
Barncroft
Party	Candidate	Votes	%	±%
Liberal Democrats	Mike Hayward	348	48.0	
Labour	Mike Rogers	247	34.1	
Conservative	Lorraine Shepherd	112	15.4	
Independent Labour	Patricia Hoar	18	2.5	
Majority		101	13.9	
Turnout		725	18.3	−3.5
Liberal Democrats gain from Independent		Swing		

Battins
Party	Candidate	Votes	%	±%
Labour	Ralph Cousins	338	39.1	
Liberal Democrats	Andrew Martin	279	32.3	
Conservative	Thelma Carpenter	218	25.2	
Independent Labour	Eric Barney	30	3.5	
Majority		59	6.8	
Turnout		865	15.9	−1.3
Labour gain from Independent		Swing		

Bedhampton
Party	Candidate	Votes	%	±%
Liberal Democrats	John Worley	1,053	48.0	
Conservative	Peter Bee	975	44.4	
Labour	Richard Brown	167	7.6	
Majority		78	3.6	
Turnout		2,195	36.1	+1.5
Liberal Democrats hold		Swing		

Bondfields
Party	Candidate	Votes	%	±%
Labour	Terry Hart	626	62.8	
Conservative	Mary Brown	222	22.3	
Liberal Democrats	John Coslett	149	14.9	
Majority		404	40.5	
Turnout		997	19.6	+1.4
Labour hold		Swing		

Cowplain
Party	Candidate	Votes	%	±%
Independent	Joan Rea	1,068	69.3	
Liberal Democrats	Rodney Crawford	313	20.3	
Labour	Elizabeth Johnston	160	10.4	
Majority		755	49.0	
Turnout		1,541	21.9	−4.2
Independent hold		Swing		

Emsworth
Party	Candidate	Votes	%	±%
Conservative	David Colson	1,814	59.2	
Liberal Democrats	Michael Bolt	1,041	34.0	
Labour	Phillip Rees	209	6.8	
Majority		773	25.2	
Turnout		3,064	39.0	−0.7
Conservative gain from Liberal Democrats		Swing		

Hart Plain
Party	Candidate	Votes	%	±%
Conservative	Leonard Shaw	639	46.7	
Liberal Democrats	Ronald Purkis	586	42.8	
Labour	Bill Wheeler	143	10.5	
Majority		53	3.9	
Turnout		1,368	20.8	+0.4
Conservative gain from Liberal Democrats		Swing		

Hayling East
Party	Candidate	Votes	%	±%
Conservative	Peter Quick	1,262	67.2	
Liberal Democrats	Margaret Causer	400	21.3	
Labour	Ronald Russell	215	11.5	
Majority		862	45.9	
Turnout		1,877	26.2	−0.3
Conservative hold		Swing		

Hayling West
Party	Candidate	Votes	%	±%
Conservative	Charles Bond	1,676	77.7	
Liberal Democrats	Doris Temple	284	13.2	
Labour	Ruth Conder	196	9.1	
Majority		1,392	64.5	
Turnout		2,156	31.1	+3.8
Conservative hold		Swing		

Purbrook
Party	Candidate	Votes	%	±%
Conservative	Gwen Blackett	1,293	69.8	
Liberal Democrats	Craig Bazley	287	15.5	
Labour	Giles Harris	273	14.7	
Majority		1,006	54.3	
Turnout		1,853	25.8	−1.9
Conservative hold		Swing		

St Faiths
Party	Candidate	Votes	%	±%
Conservative	June Fulcher	1,494	47.8	
Liberal Democrats	Dennis West	1,436	45.9	
Labour	Derek Smith	196	6.3	
Majority		58	1.9	
Turnout		3,126	40.2	+3.5
Conservative gain from Liberal Democrats		Swing		

Stakes
Party	Candidate	Votes	%	±%
Conservative	Bill Blackett	722	45.8	
Labour	Margaret Beauvoisin	528	33.5	
Liberal Democrats	Christine Pylee	325	20.6	
Majority		194	12.3	
Turnout		1,575	19.6	−1.4
Conservative gain from Labour		Swing		

Warren Park
Party	Candidate	Votes	%	±%
Labour	Caroline Petty	295	41.3	
Liberal Democrats	Brian Ennis	272	38.1	
Conservative	Angela Guest	138	19.3	
Independent Labour	George Hoar	9	1.3	
Majority		23	3.2	
Turnout		714	15.8	−6.0
Labour gain from Liberal Democrats		Swing		

Waterloo
Party	Candidate	Votes	%	±%
Conservative	Ken Moss	1,629	72.1	
Liberal Democrats	Ann Bazley	357	15.8	
Labour	Robert Perry	273	12.1	
Majority		1,272	56.3	
Turnout		2,259	28.4	+0.2
Conservative hold		Swing		

== By-elections between 2000 and 2002 ==
=== Hart Plain ===
Hart Plain By-Election 15 February 2001
Party	Candidate	Votes	%	±%
Liberal Democrats		500	50.8	+8.0
Conservative		335	34.0	−12.7
Labour		149	15.1	+4.7
Majority		165	16.8	
Turnout		984	14.8	−6.0
Liberal Democrats hold		Swing		

=== St Faiths ===
St Faith's By-Election 7 June 2001
Party	Candidate	Votes	%	±%
Conservative		2,274	44.4	−3.4
Liberal Democrats		1,989	38.8	−7.1
Labour		864	16.9	+10.6
Majority		285	5.6	+3.7
Turnout		5,127		
Conservative hold		Swing		
