= 2008 Havant Borough Council election =

2008 UK local government election

← 2007	1 May 2008	2010 →

14 of 38 seats to Havant Borough Council 20 seats needed for a majority
	First party	Second party	Third party
Party	Conservative	Liberal Democrats	Labour
Seats before	31	3	3
Seats won	12	2	1
Seats after	32	3	3
Seat change	▲1	Steady	▼1
Popular vote	17,202	6,977	3,263
- Results by Ward
Council control before election
Conservative
Council control after election
Conservative

The 2008 Havant Borough Council election took place on 1 May 2008 to elect members of Havant Borough Council in Hampshire, England. One third of the council was up for election and the Conservative Party stayed in overall control of the council.

After the election, the composition of the council was:

- Conservative 32
- Labour 3
- Liberal Democrats 3

== Background ==
Before the election the Conservatives ran the council with 31 of the 38 seats. 14 seats were contested at the election with a total of 55 candidates standing at the election. As well as full slates from the Conservatives, Labour and Liberal Democrats, there were 9 candidates from the UK Independence Party and 2 each from the Green Party and the English Democrats.

== Election result ==
The Conservatives increased their majority on the council after Mike Sceal took a seat in Warren Park ward from Labour. This took the Conservatives to 32 seats, while Labour dropped to 3 seats on the council. Meanwhile, Liberal Democrat Faith Ponsonby held a seat in Battins ward to keep the Liberal Democrats having 3 councillors. Overall turnout at the election was 32.2%.

Havant local election result 2008
Party	Seats	Gains	Losses	Net gain/loss	Seats %	Votes %	Votes	+/−
Conservative	12	1	0	+1	85.7	58.0	17,202	+0.5
Liberal Democrats	1	0	0	0	7.1	23.5	6,977	+0.2
Labour	1	0	1	-1	7.1	11.0	3,263	+4.6
UKIP	0	0	0	0	0.0	5.3	1,585	+3.2
Green	0	0	0	0	0.0	1.3	385	-2.9
English Democrat	0	0	0	0	0.0	0.9	253	+0.1

== Ward results ==
=== Barncroft ===
Barncroft
Party	Candidate	Votes	%	±%
Conservative	Yvonne Weeks	575	54.7	+10.7
Labour	Bill Fish	187	17.8	−9.1
UKIP	Ray Finch	146	13.9	−1.6
Liberal Democrats	Liam Hutchings	143	13.6	+0.1
Majority		388	36.9	+19.8
Turnout		1,051	24.2	−0.6
Conservative hold		Swing		

=== Battins ===
Battins
Party	Candidate	Votes	%	±%
Liberal Democrats	Faith Ponsonby	559	46.4	+16.2
Conservative	Leonard Shaw	292	24.3	−1.0
Labour	Paul Hansford	199	16.5	−15.4
UKIP	Peter Legge	154	12.8	+12.8
Majority		267	22.1	
Turnout		1,204	24.9	+1.8
Liberal Democrats hold		Swing		

=== Bedhampton ===
Bedhampton
Party	Candidate	Votes	%	±%
Conservative	Kenneth Smith	1,216	47.1	+10.2
Liberal Democrats	John Sawtell	903	35.0	−13.3
English Democrat	George Herbert	182	7.1	+2.8
Labour	Anne Edwards	170	6.6	+1.4
UKIP	Stephen Little	110	4.3	+1.1
Majority		313	12.1	
Turnout		2,581	36.8	−3.9
Conservative hold		Swing		

=== Bondfields ===
Bondfields
Party	Candidate	Votes	%	±%
Labour	Terry Hart	385	33.4	−3.0
Conservative	Anne Fairhurst	318	27.6	+10.3
Liberal Democrats	Jane Briggs	257	22.3	−23.9
UKIP	Hedley Lester	121	10.5	+10.5
English Democrat	Grant Greenham	71	6.2	+6.2
Majority		67	5.8	
Turnout		1,152	23.1	−4.1
Labour hold		Swing		

=== Cowplain ===
Cowplain
Party	Candidate	Votes	%	±%
Conservative	David Keast	1,645	71.7	−2.8
Liberal Democrats	John Jacobs	495	21.6	+4.1
Labour	Kenneth Monks	155	6.8	−1.2
Majority		1,150	50.1	−6.9
Turnout		2,295	31.4	+0.4
Conservative hold		Swing		

=== Emsworth ===
Emsworth
Party	Candidate	Votes	%	±%
Conservative	Brendan Gibb-Gray	2,287	66.1	+8.7
Liberal Democrats	Christopher Maple	699	20.2	−3.8
Labour	Ken Gilchrist	263	7.6	+0.8
UKIP	Alex Spurge	209	6.0	+0.5
Majority		1,588	45.9	+12.4
Turnout		3,458	43.9	−1.3
Conservative hold		Swing		

=== Hart Plain ===
Hart Plain
Party	Candidate	Votes	%	±%
Conservative	Elaine Shimbart	1,421	61.6	+3.1
Liberal Democrats	Rod Crawford	681	29.5	−12.0
Labour	Howard Sherlock	204	8.8	+8.8
Majority		740	32.1	+15.0
Turnout		2,306	30.9	+2.7
Conservative hold		Swing		

=== Hayling East ===
Hayling East
Party	Candidate	Votes	%	±%
Conservative	Sheila Pearce	1,494	63.0	+2.3
Liberal Democrats	Janis Shawashi	351	14.8	+1.6
UKIP	Gary Kerrin	306	12.9	+12.9
Labour	Colin Blunden	221	9.3	+9.3
Majority		1,143	48.2	+7.9
Turnout		2,372	32.6	−1.1
Conservative hold		Swing		

=== Hayling West ===
Hayling West
Party	Candidate	Votes	%	±%
Conservative	Victor Pierce-Jones	1,842	68.6	+5.3
Liberal Democrats	Tim Pascall	449	16.7	+7.9
UKIP	Russell Thomas	212	7.9	+3.5
Labour	Derek Smith	181	6.7	+6.7
Majority		1,393	51.9	+7.7
Turnout		2,684	38.8	−3.2
Conservative hold		Swing		

=== Purbrook ===
Purbrook
Party	Candidate	Votes	%	±%
Conservative	David Farrow	1,471	66.2	+11.9
Liberal Democrats	Jennifer Moore-Blunt	280	12.6	+2.8
Labour	David Potts	280	12.6	+1.4
Green	Julie Blenkharn	190	8.6	+2.3
Majority		1,191	53.6	+17.8
Turnout		2,221	31.0	−0.2
Conservative hold		Swing		

=== St Faiths ===
St Faiths
Party	Candidate	Votes	%	±%
Conservative	David Guest	1,318	45.9	−2.4
Liberal Democrats	Ray Cobbett	915	31.9	+1.4
UKIP	Elizabeth Snow	223	7.8	+4.0
Labour	Ralph Cousins	218	7.6	−0.2
Green	Tim Dawes	195	6.8	−0.2
Majority		403	14.0	−3.8
Turnout		2,869	40.5	−2.3
Conservative hold		Swing		

=== Stakes ===
Stakes
Party	Candidate	Votes	%	±%
Conservative	Caren Tarrant	1,108	62.7	+11.1
Liberal Democrats	Ann Bazley	365	20.6	+1.6
Labour	Barry Steel	295	16.7	−2.0
Majority		743	42.0	+9.4
Turnout		1,768	23.8	−0.3
Conservative hold		Swing		

=== Warren Park ===
Warren Park
Party	Candidate	Votes	%	±%
Conservative	Mike Sceal	407	36.1	+9.0
Liberal Democrats	Ann Brown	383	34.0	+15.9
Labour	Virginia Steel	234	20.7	−21.7
UKIP	Stephen Harris	104	9.2	−3.2
Majority		24	2.1	
Turnout		1,128	23.5	+3.9
Conservative gain from Labour		Swing		

=== Waterloo ===
Waterloo
Party	Candidate	Votes	%	±%
Conservative	John Hunt	1,808	70.2	−2.2
Liberal Democrats	Frederick Dunford	497	19.3	+1.0
Labour	Margaret Beauvoisin	271	10.5	+1.2
Majority		1,311	50.9	−3.2
Turnout		2,576	34.1	+0.1
Conservative hold		Swing		

== By-elections between 2008 and 2010 ==
A by-election was held in Waterloo ward on 4 September 2008 after the death of councillor Wendy Brown. The seat was narrowly held for the Conservatives by Ray Bastin with a majority of 48 votes over the Liberal Democrats.

Waterloo by-election 4 September 2008
Party	Candidate	Votes	%	±%
Conservative	Ray Bastin	849	48.7	−21.5
Liberal Democrats	Fred Dunford	801	45.9	+26.6
Labour	Howard Sherlock	95	5.4	−5.1
Majority		48	2.8	−48.1
Turnout		1,745	23.2	−10.9
Conservative hold		Swing		
