= British military narrow-gauge railways =

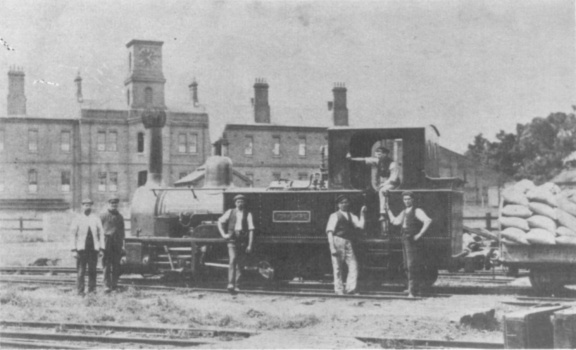
Locomotive Yorkshire on the Chattenden and Upnor Railway

These are narrow-gauge railways at military establishments and former UK Government-owned explosives sites. These locations were often subject to the Official Secrets Act and other government restrictions, so many of them are less well documented.

The industrial use of narrow-gauge railways was quite extensive amongst the various military and civilian explosive factories, for example ICI Nobel's works at Ardeer and the Agency Explosive Factories run by ICI Nobel in the Second World War. In another example, the Ministry of Supply (MOS) Factory Dalbeattie used 2 ft 6 in (762 mm) gauge with a variety of bogie trucks mostly pushed by teams of three to six women. Stores, explosives, chemicals, rubbish and sewage, were all transported on this narrow-gauge system, which used at least 8 miles (13 km) of track.

== Weapons range railways ==
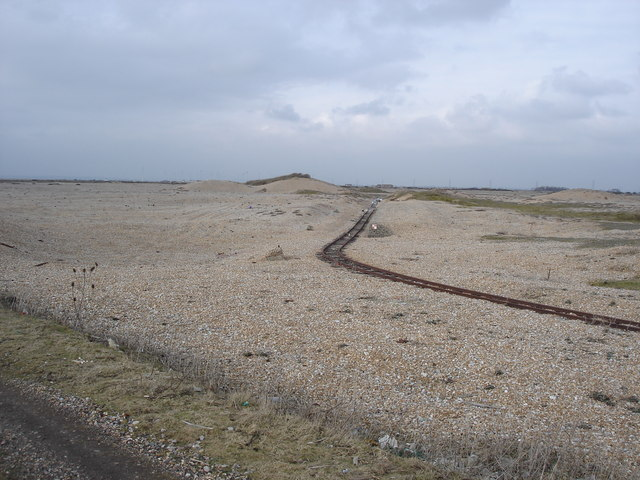
Lydd ranges

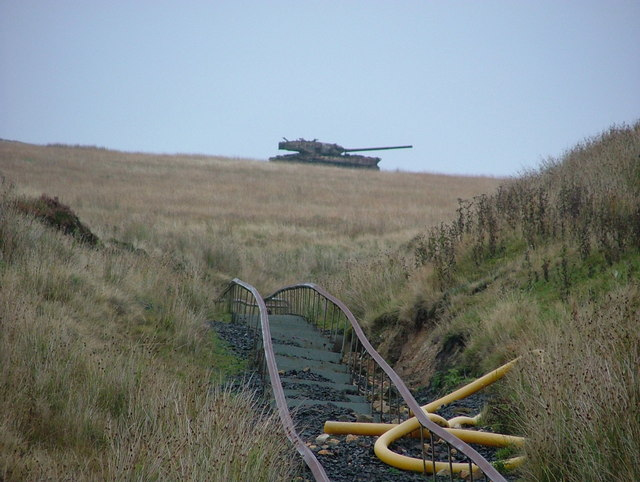
Redesdale ranges

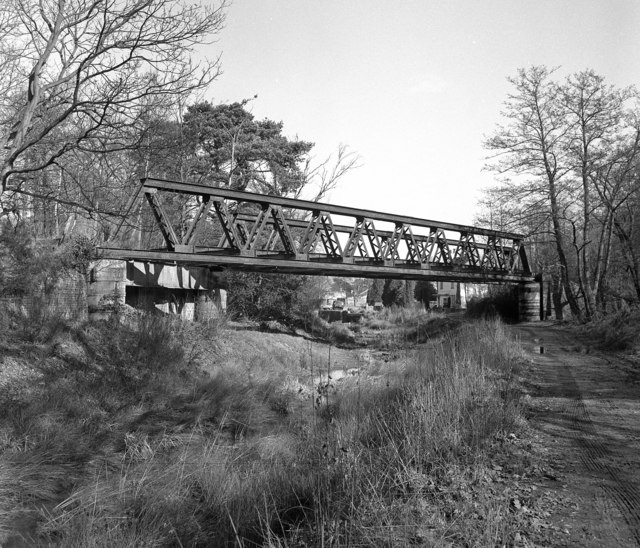
Bisley Tramway bridge

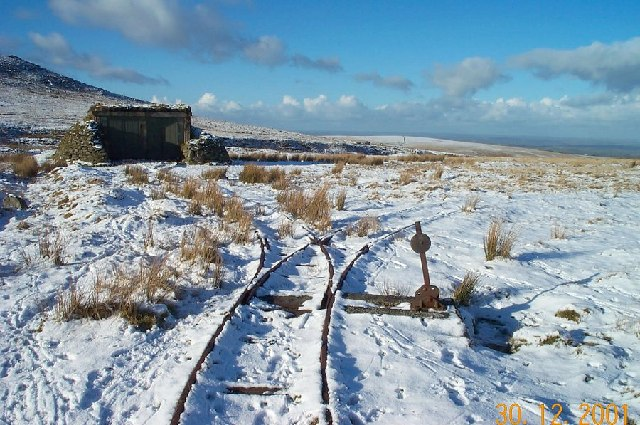
Rowtor Target Railway

Name	Opened	Closed	Gauge	Location	Notes
DOE Okehampton Gun Ranges	?	after 1979	2 ft 6 in (762 mm)	Okehampton, England	Target railway
DOE Redesdale Ranges target railway	?	?	2 ft 6 in (762 mm)	Redesdale, England	Target railway
Fort George Range	?	?	2 ft (610 mm)	Inverness, Scotland	Target railway
Lydd Ranges	1936	Present	2 ft (610 mm)	Lydd, England	Principally a target railway, though also carries personnel and equipment around the ranges. At least 39 locomotives and powered trollies have worked here.
National Rifle Association Bisley Tramways	1898	after 1971	2 ft (610 mm)	Bisley, England	The NRA originally had a temporary shooting range and railway on Wimbledon Common but in 1888 moved to Bisley. Initially using a Merryweather steam tram locomotive, later using diesel locomotives.
RAF Hell's Mouth target railway	late 1930s	1945	?	Abersoch, Wales	A target range railway operated by hand or rope-hauled in the dunes southeast of the airfield.
Romney Marsh weapons range railway	before 1975	present ?	2 ft (610 mm)	New Romney, England	Locomotive-worked network of lines across Romney Marsh
Rowtor Target Railway	1958	?	2 ft (610 mm)	Okehampton, England	Disused target railway with an unmanned Wickham trolley

== Armaments depots and ordnance factories ==
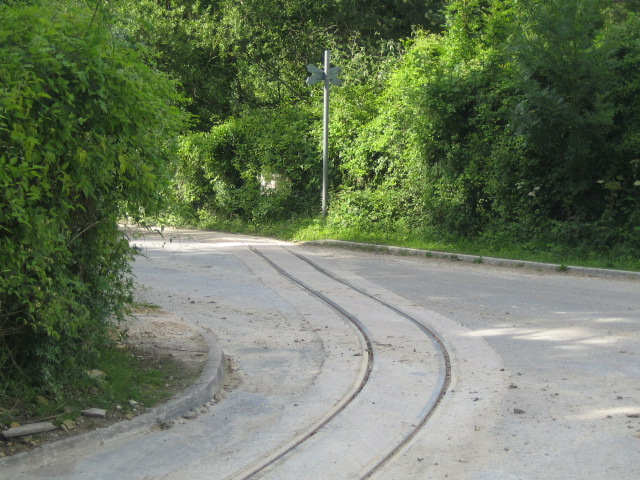
Chilmark depot railway

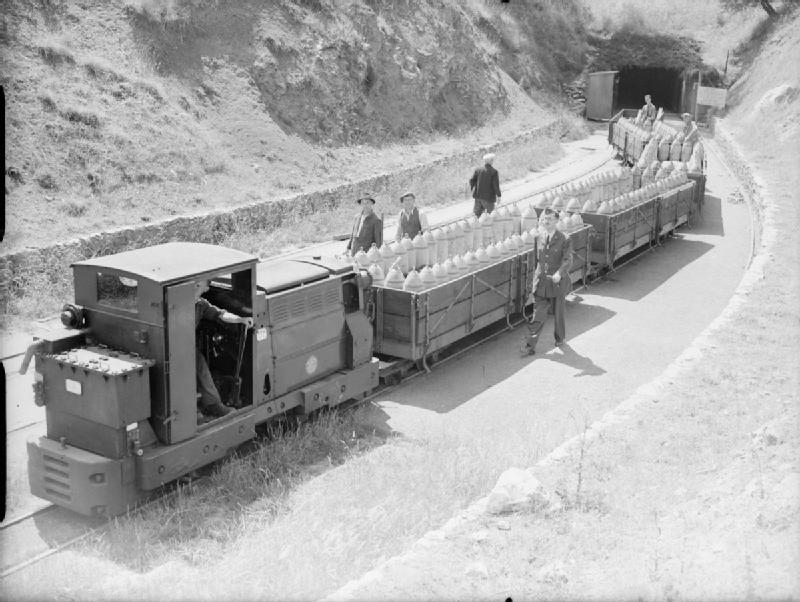
RAF Fauld

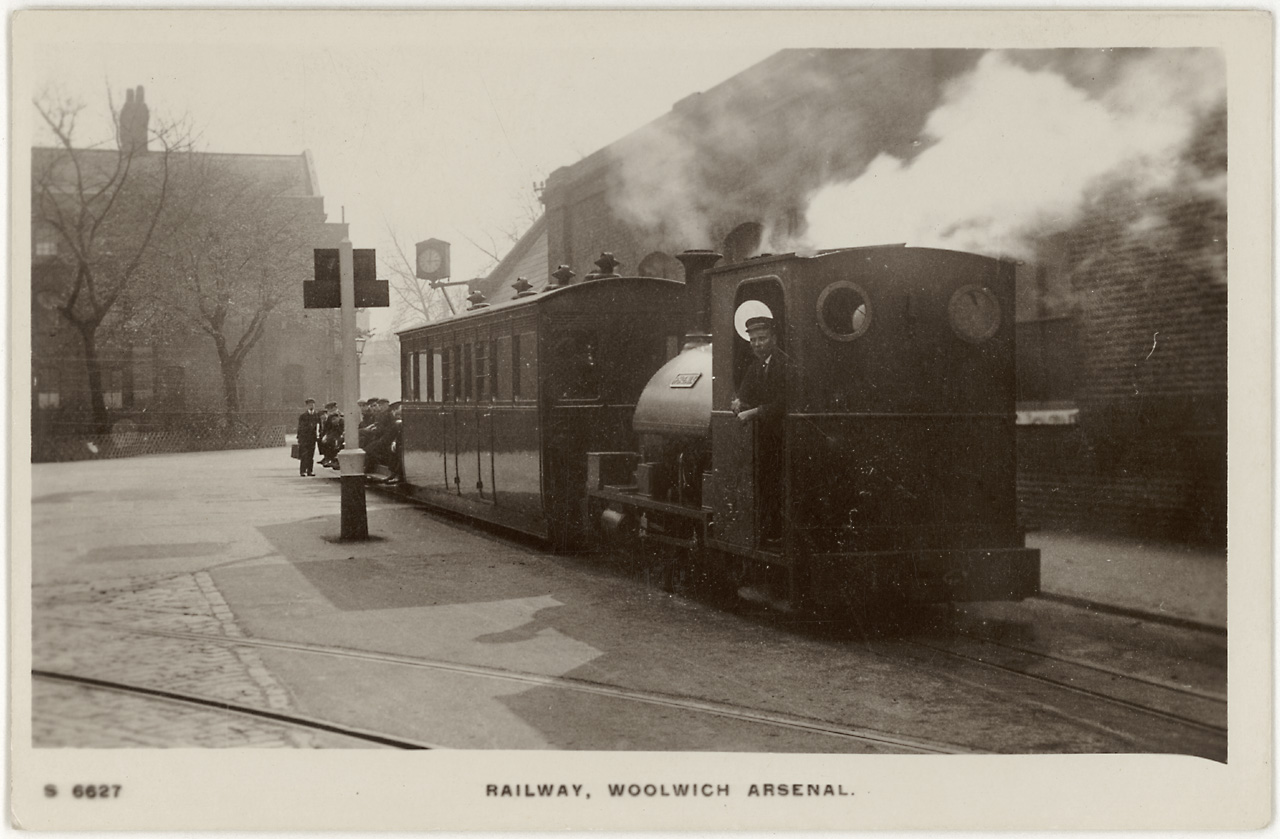
Royal Arsenal Railway

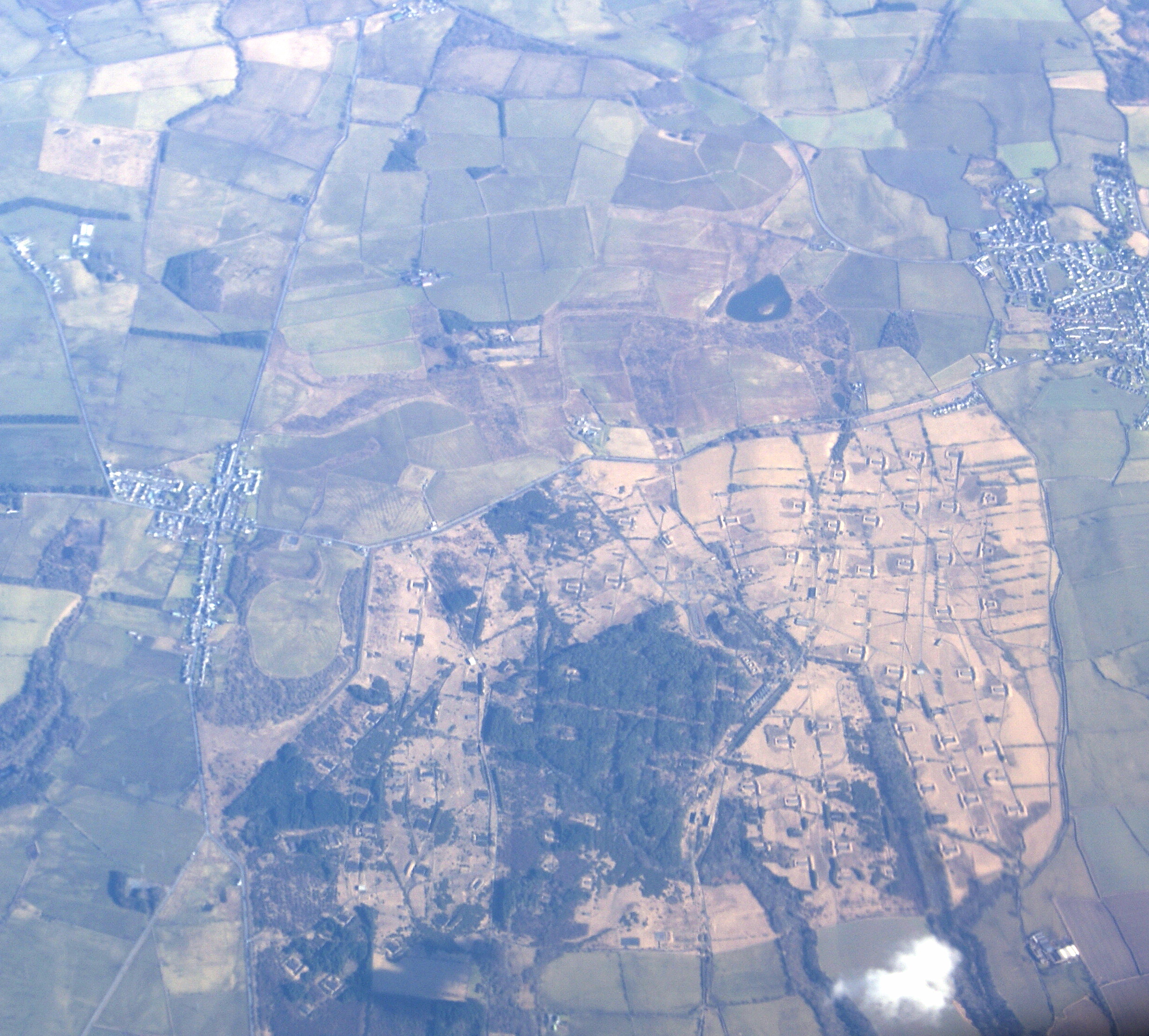
RNAD Broughton Moor

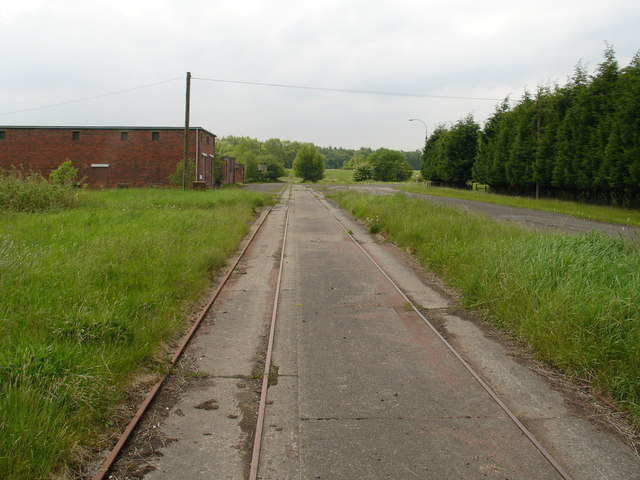
ROF Bishopton

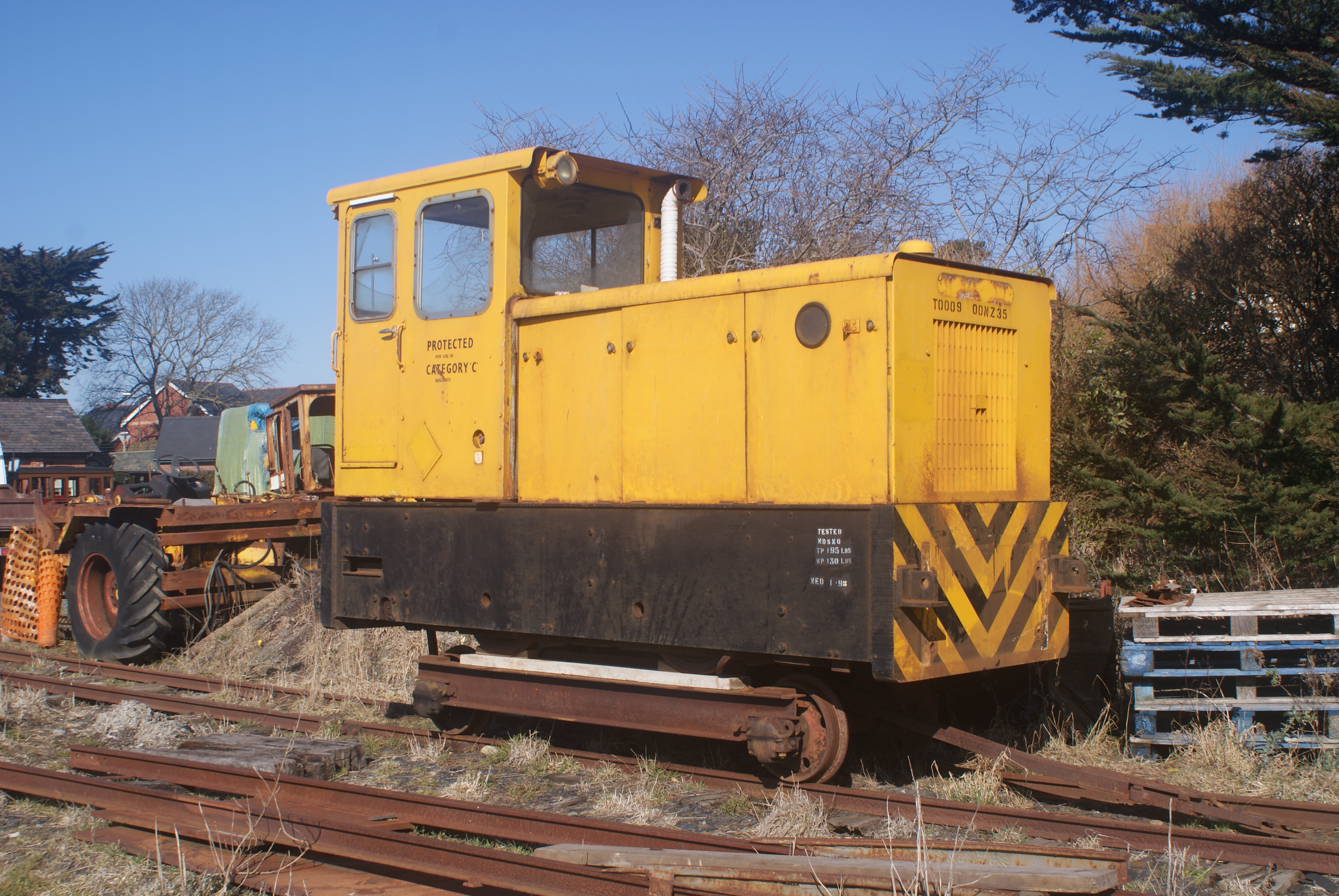
Trecwn Railway

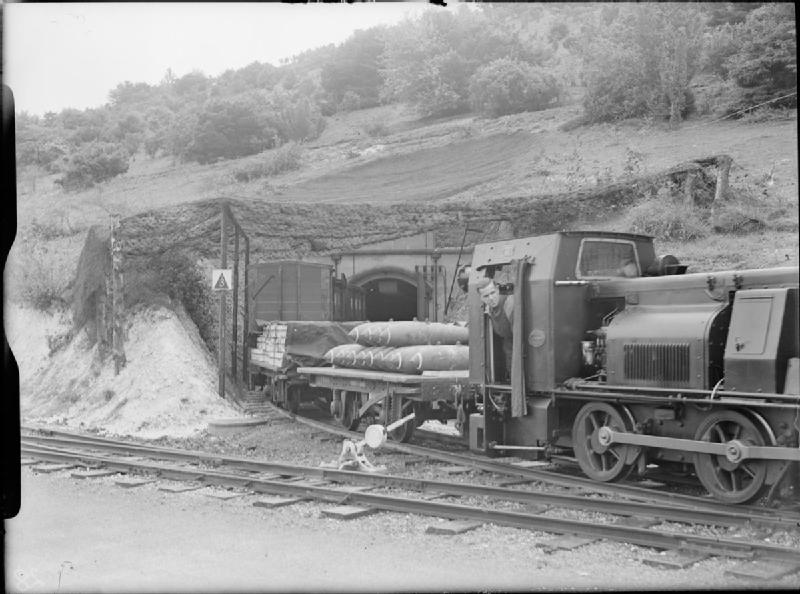
RNAD Dean Hill

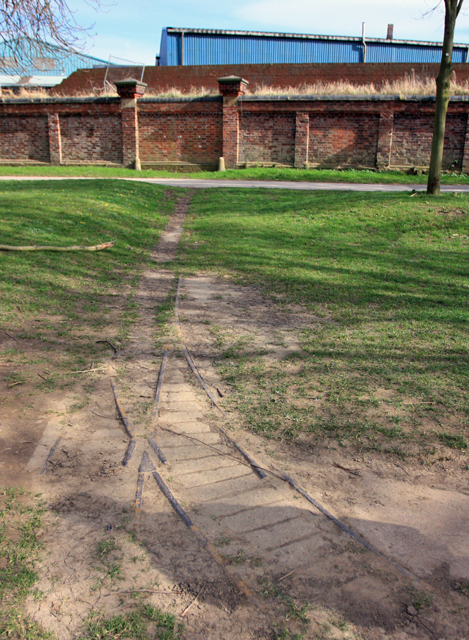
Imphal Barracks in York

Name	Opened	Closed	Gauge	Location	Notes
CAD Eastriggs Depot railway	?	closed 2012	2 ft (610 mm)	Eastriggs, Scotland	Extensive WW II armaments depot line using parts of the site of the former HM Factory, Gretna. A sub-depot of CAD Longtown.
Priddy's Hard	about 1850	about 1960	18 in (457 mm) and also later 2 ft 6 in (762 mm)	Gosport, England	Ammunition transport railway, within the Royal Naval Armaments Depot, between store houses and piers. Eight battery-electric locomotives were used after 1929.
Chatham Dockyard	1860s	1930s	18 in (457 mm)	Chatham, England	Internal rail system serving the dockyard.
Chattenden and Upnor Railway	1885	1961	2 ft 6 in (762 mm)	Chattenden, England	Light railway serving Chattenden barracks and armament stores
Davington Light Railway	1916	1918	1,000 mm (3 ft 3 3/8 in)	Faversham, England	Short-lived metre-gauge line serving an Admiralty munitions factory. The three locomotives were sold to Brazil where at least one survived until 1988.
Gunpowder Railway	1859	1961	2 ft 6 in (762 mm)	Waltham Abbey, England	Extensive 11 miles of narrow gauge railway serving the Waltham Abbey Royal Gunpowder Mills site used for the transportation of the materials used in the creation of gunpowder and other explosives. Re-opened as a Heritage Narrow Gauge Railway in 2022."Gunpowder Railway - History".
HM Factory, Gretna	1916	1919	2 ft (610 mm)	Gretna, Scotland	Extensive WW I Cordite factory line
Lodge Hill and Upnor Railway	1873	1885	18 in (457 mm)	Chattenden, England	Served the construction of the Chattenden and Upnor Railway.
Royal Air Force Chilmark Depot railway	late 1930s	1995	2 ft (610 mm)	Chilmark, Wiltshire, England	Extensive WW II armaments depot lines using underground Chilmark Quarries and above-ground storage at satellite site at Dinton, Wiltshire.
RAF Fauld Depot railway		by 1979	2 ft (610 mm)	Fauld, England	Underground ammunition store during WWII with supply railway.
Royal Arsenal Railway	1873	1966	18 in (457 mm) and 1 ft 11 1/2 in (597 mm)	Woolwich, England	Extensive internal rail system serving the Royal Arsenal.
RCAF Seaford Head target railway	after 1939	by 1945	2 ft (610 mm)	Seaford Head, Wales	Horse drawn target range railway about 1 mile long.
RNAD Broughton Moor railway	before 1943	1992	2 ft 6 in (762 mm)	Broughton Moor, England	Locomotive-worked line hauling ammunition around the depot.
RNAD Dean Hill Depot railway	before 1942	2003	2 ft 6 in (762 mm)	West Dean, England	Locomotive-worked line hauling ammunition around the depot.
RNAD Trecwn	1938	1990	2 ft 6 in (762 mm)	Near Fishguard, West Wales	Locomotive-worked line hauling ammunition around the depot. Infrastructure built of copper to reduce sparks
ROF Bishopton	1940	1950s - 2000	2 ft 6 in (762 mm)	Bishopton, Scotland	Approx 80 miles of internal rail system serving the World War II Cordite factories.
Royal Navy Holton Heath Cordite Factory	1914	1946	2 ft 6 in (762 mm)	Holton Heath, England	Extensive explosives factory complex using battery electric and fireless steam locomotives
Royal Navy Stokes Bay railway	1880s	1919		Stokes Bay, England	Steam locomotive worked line.
Royal Navy Underwater Weapons Establishment		after 1979	2 ft (610 mm)	Weymouth, England	Battery-electric locomotive worked line.
Vickers Engineering Wyke Regis Pier railway	before 1921	1968	2 ft (610 mm)	Wyke Regis, England	Pier railway used to transport torpedoes from the factory to ships.

== National Filling Factories (WW1) ==
These factories were created during WW1 to unite the explosives, detonator, etc and the shell casings to make live munitions. This activity had the highest explosion risk, so precautions were very strict. They all followed a similar pattern in having standard gauge rail sidings separate from the filling area. These were used for delivery of the raw materials and for shipping out the products. The interior 'clean area' for filling comprised many small lightweight huts over a large area linked by raised walkways upon which lightweight 2 ft (610 mm) gauge rail was laid. Trolleys with bronze wheels were normally moved by hand between these buildings, though ponies or horses were sometimes used.

Production ceased at the factories at the end of the war, though some of them were used for dismantling ammunition into the early 1920s. Some clues as to the railways on these sites come from the auctions as the sites were cleared, examples are :

- No 7 National Filling Factory in Hayes, Middlesex auction included 5,000 yards (4,600 m) of light Decauville track.
- No 10 National Filling Factory in Foleshill, Coventry auction listed 20 long tons (22.4 short tons; 20.3 t) Decauville track (16lbs), 50 light and heavy turntables on ball and roller bearings.

Explosives stores (magazines) were in some cases remote from the clean area, and towards the end of the war there were a few orders for internal combustion locos to move materials. No 7 Filling Factory at Hayes had an entirely separate explosives magazine at Northolt, where a main line siding was linked to the 20 separate storage bunkers by light rail. 100 tons of explosives were moved each day by rail to the Hayes plant for processing. Records exist of two Baguley 2 foot gauge internal combustion locos ordered in 1917 by No 7 National Filling Factory for Northolt. Seven similar locos were ordered in 1917 for No 2 National Filling Factory at Aintree, so this must also have had light rail outside the main assembly area, such as for storage of shell cases (as this factory was designed to handle ship loads of munitions components received from overseas at Liverpool Docks).

== Supply depots ==
Name	Opened	Closed	Gauge	Location	Notes
Deptford Special Reserve Depot	1916	1919	18 in (457 mm)	Deptford, England	Extensive WW I food supply depot line. At least four steam locomotives worked here, two or three of which went to the Sand Hutton Light Railway after the war.

== Fortifications ==
Name	Opened	Closed	Gauge	Location	Notes
Braefoot Bay			10 in (254 mm) ?	Aberdour, Scotland	Fortification supply railway
Flat Holm Battery			2 ft (610 mm)	Bristol Channel, Wales	Fortification supply railway
Hoo Ness Tramway	before 1914	after 1979	2 ft (610 mm)	Hoo Ness, England	Locomotive-worked tramway. May have been 2 ft 6 in (762 mm) gauge previously
Hurst Castle	1895	1956	18 in (457 mm)	Hurst Castle, England	Line for moving ammunition and supplies around the castle. Used hand and donkey hauled wagons. Much track still in situ.
South Heighton railway	1941	1941	2 ft 6 in (762 mm)	Newhaven, England	Hand-worked line to aid construction of HMS Forward underground command centre.
Steep Holm railway	1880s	1946	2 ft (610 mm) ?	Steep Holm, North Somerset, England	Fortification supply railway. Palmerston forts, shown on 1886 Ordnance Survey maps. Relaid in World War II. Finally Demolished 1946.

== Training camps ==
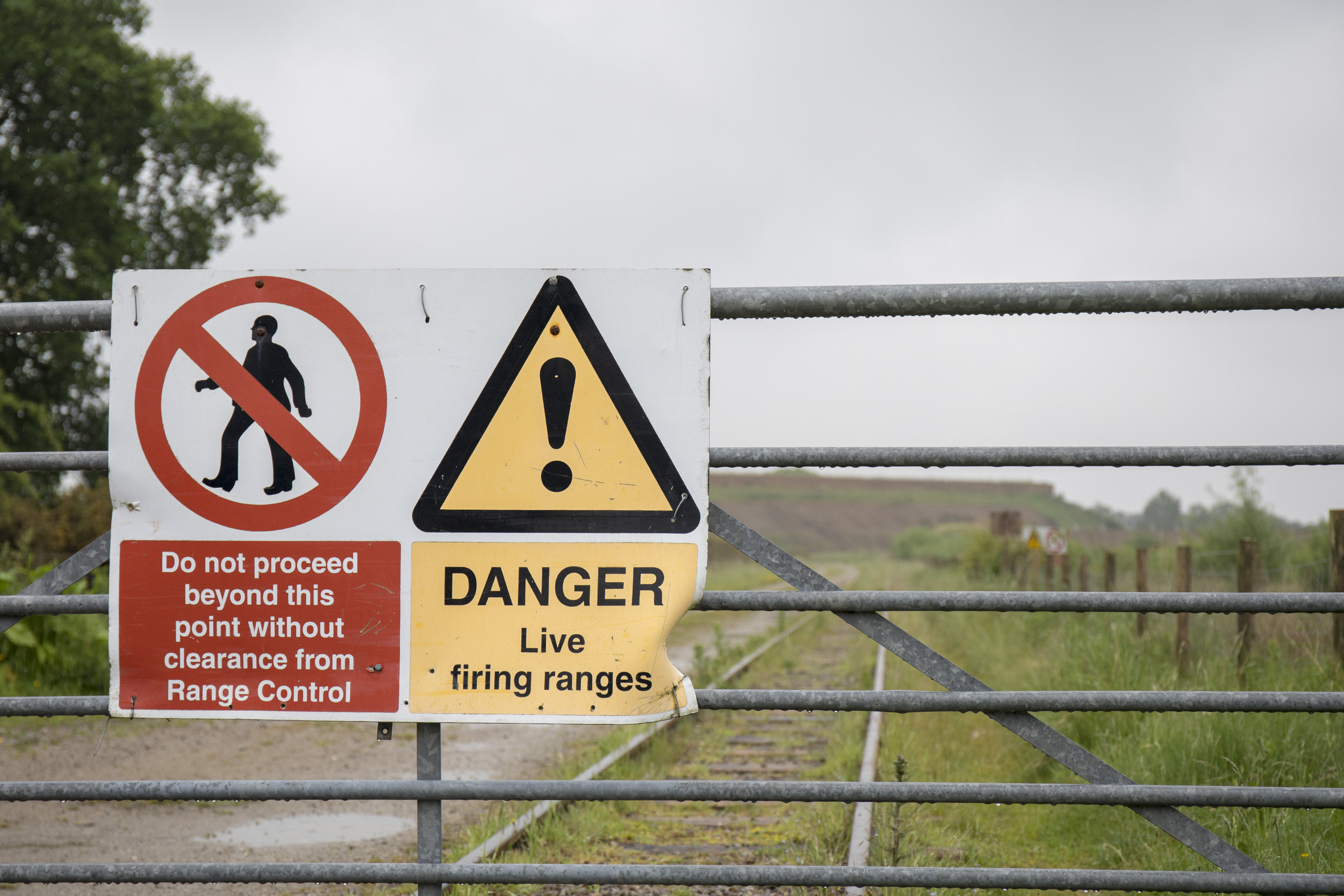
Gate across the railway at Strensall Ranges. The trolleys are hand-pushed to take the targets out to the range, but the targets remain static and the railway is used for transportation only.

Name	Opened	Closed	Gauge	Location	Notes
Aldershot Narrow Gauge Suspension Railway	1872	Unknown	18 in (457 mm)	Aldershot Garrison	Experimental monorail
Kinmel Camp Railway	1914	1917	2 ft (610 mm)	St. Asaph, Wales	Locomotive-worked construction railway for the Kinmel Camp
Longmoor Military Railway	1903	1907	18 in (457 mm); 2 ft 6 in (762 mm)	Weaversdown, England	Early 18 in (457 mm) gauge construction line used to assist in the demolition of army huts. Relaid as standard gauge starting in 1905-1907. 2 ft 6 in (762 mm) gauge line at the extensive railway training centre at Longmoor.
Strensall Ranges, HQ Strensall Training Centre,	1870	Present	3 ft 3 1/2”	Strensall, York, England	Specifically built to carry targetry to the ranges, originally 6 in number, F Range was converted to a SARTS Range and the rails were removed. Still continues to be used for its original purpose, Range trolleys are named after characters from “Thomas the Tank engine”. The system has a “siding” behind each front mantlet allowing trolleys to clear the main line. 1,165 yds long.
RAF Calshot Camp railway	1919	1946	2 ft (610 mm)	Calshot, England	Short line serving Calshot camp and pier. Steam locomotives were used, one of which is preserved on the Talyllyn Railway as Douglas.

== Others ==
Name	Opened	Closed	Gauge	Location	Notes
Royal Navy Haslar Hospital	by 1910	1918	18 in (457 mm)	Haslar, England	Hand worked line to move ammunitions and stores around the hospital site.

== See also ==
- War Department Light Railways
- British industrial narrow-gauge railways
- British narrow-gauge railways
