= Longmoor Downs railway station =

Railway station in Hampshire, England

Longmoor Downs

General information
- Location: East Hampshire; England
- Coordinates: 51.075°N 0.868°W
- Platforms: 2

Other information
- Status: Disused

History
- Original company: Longmoor Military Railway

Key dates
- probably 1907: station opened
- 31 October 1969: closed
Location

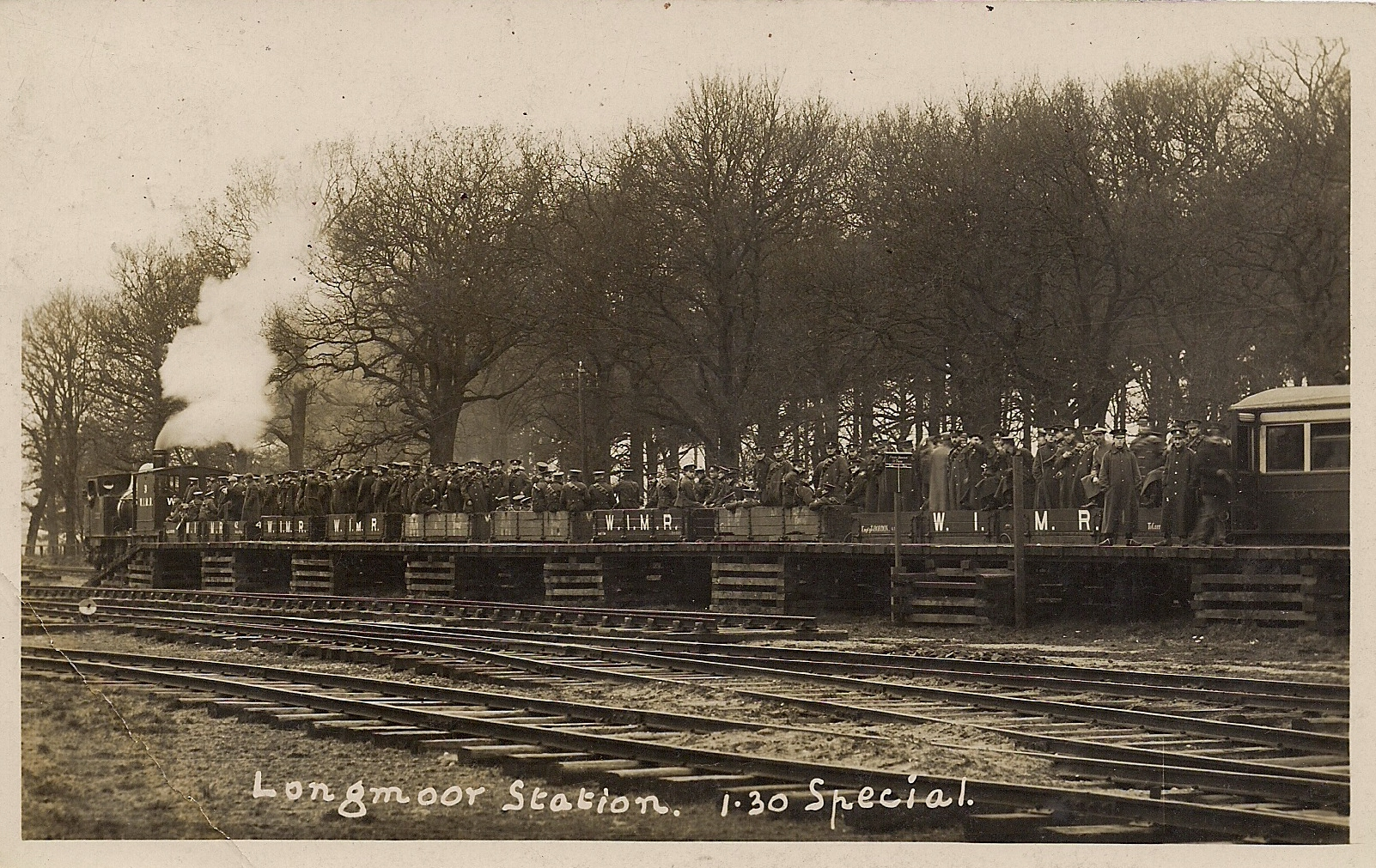
Longmoor_Downs_railway_station

Longmoor Downs railway station is a former railway station, on the Longmoor Military Railway serving Longmoor Military Camp. (Note: Longmoor Downs is on the station platform nameboards, at least in 1966, the station was Longmoor in the timetables of 1932, 1946 & 1965 and it was occasionally referred to as Longmoor Down.) The station was the Southern terminus of the original standard gauge railway opened in stages between 1907 and 1908.

The station was also the Northern terminus of an 18 inches (460 mm) tramway used mainly to transport stone from a local quarry to be used in the building of Longmoor Camp and other facilities. There was a loading bank for this line to the South of Longmoor goods yard, it was in use until WWI after which it disappeared during enlargements of the standard gauge facilities. The line was eventually extended northwards towards Bordon as an aid to constructing the standard gauge line.

The early station had no permanent platforms, none are shown on the OS map surveyed in 1908, but undated photographs show platforms constructed of sleepers, the stations on the line were upgraded from 1923 and by 1934 the platforms were solid ash surfaced.

The sleeper platforms appeared to be single sided but by 1928 the main passenger platform was a central platform with running lines both sides, there was also an ash platform and dock to the South of the main platform forming a bay on one side with the other on a through line. The station had an adjacent, extensive, goods yard, workshops and engine shed, there were two block posts, the Army's name for a signal box, one at each end of the station, there was a training school and a headquarters building.

The railway completed its extension to Liss in 1933 and additional services were provided, prior to the extension opening the normal service was three trains to and from Bordon in summer, more in winter and more on Mondays and Fridays for soldiers going on leave. After 1933 there were more services, some ran through and some just served either the northern or the southern sections of the line.

The station was featured in the films The Great St Trinian's Train Robbery, when it was named Fordbridge at one end and Nutcombe at the other and The Magnificent Two.

The station was closed along with the rest of the line on 31 October 1969. After the closure the track was removed, the station demolished and the site cleared for the realigned A3 road leaving no trace of the railways existence.

Preceding station	Disused railways	Following station
Woolmer	Longmoor Military Railway	Weaversdown Halt
