= Liss Forest =

Hamlet in Hampshire, England

Coordinates: 51.054°N 0.886°W

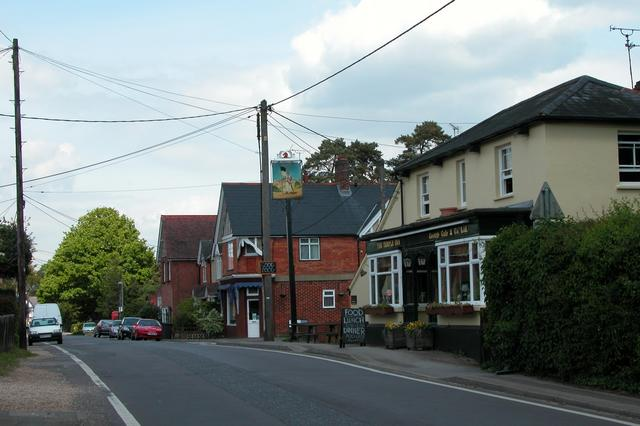
- The Temple pub, Liss Forest

- Location within Hampshire
- OS grid reference: SU785275
- Civil parish: Liss
- District: East Hampshire
- Shire county: Hampshire
- Region: South East
- Country: England
- Sovereign state: United Kingdom
- Post town: LISS
- Postcode district: GU33
- Dialling code: 01730
- Police: Hampshire and Isle of Wight
- Fire: Hampshire and Isle of Wight
- Ambulance: South Central
- UK Parliament: East Hampshire

Liss Forest is a hamlet in the civil parish of Liss, in Hampshire, England. It formerly had its own railway station (Liss Forest Road) on the now closed Longmoor Military Railway. Liss Forest has a pub (The Temple Inn). Liss Forest is surrounded by open forest land, much of which is owned by the Ministry of Defence and is used for military training.
