= Douglas (locomotive) =

Narrow gauge steam locomotive

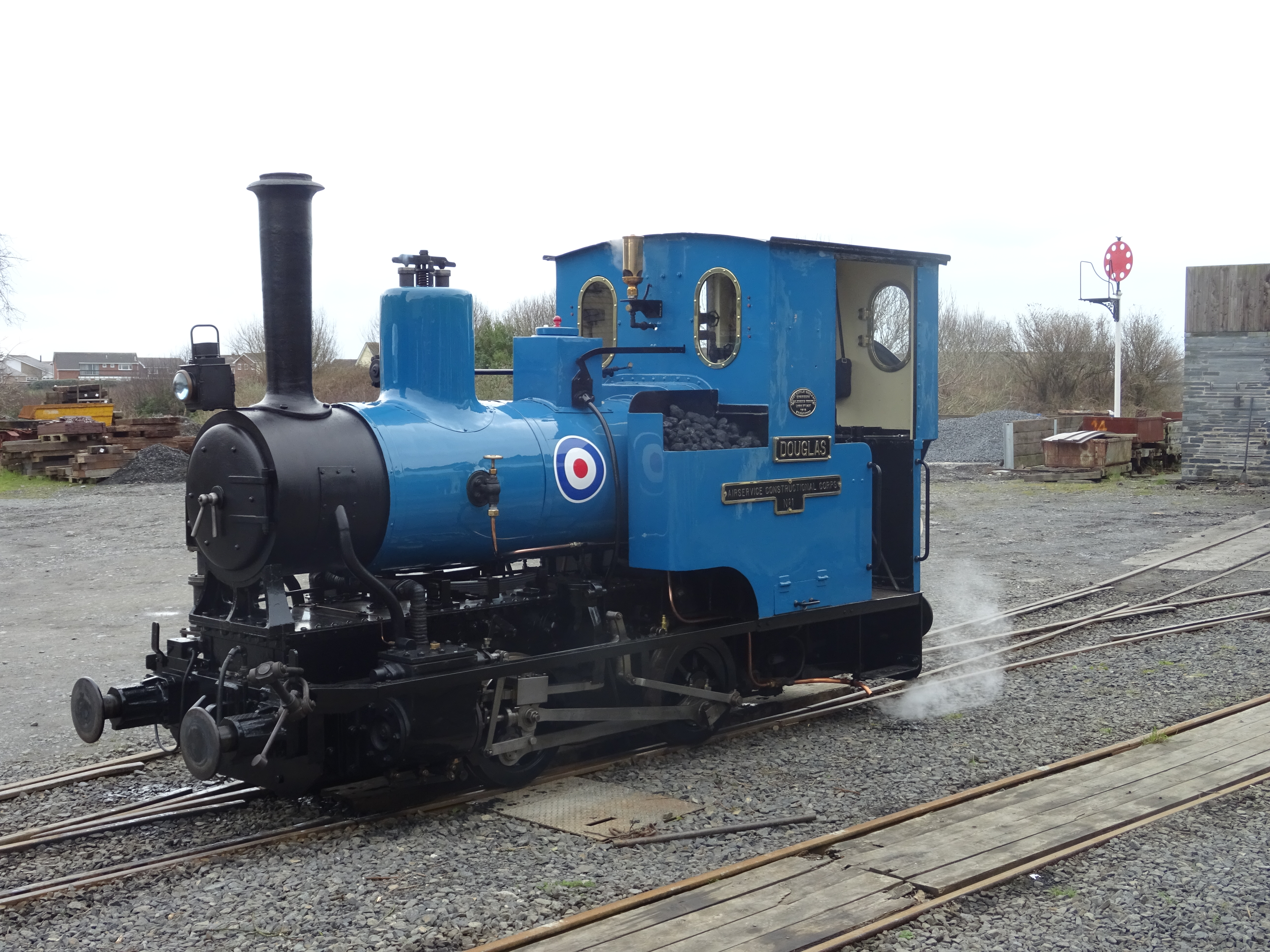
- Douglas in RAF blue
Type and origin
- Power type: Steam
- Builder: Andrew Barclay Sons & Co. Ltd.
- Serial number: 1431
- Model: E Class
- Build date: 1918
Specifications
- Configuration
  - Whyte: 0-4-0WT
- Gauge: 2 ft 3 in (686 mm)
- Driver dia.: 2 ft 0 in (610 mm)
- Wheelbase: 3 ft 11.25 in (1.20 m)
- Length: 15 ft 6 in (4.72 m)
- Loco weight: 8 long tons 0 cwt (17,900 lb or 8.1 t)
- Boiler pressure: 160 lbf/in^{2} (1,100 kPa)
- Cylinders: Two, outside
- Cylinder size: 6 7/8 in × 10 3/4 in (175 mm × 273 mm)
- Valve gear: Walschaerts
Performance figures
- Tractive effort: 3,290 lbf (14.63 kN)
Career
- Operators: Air Service Constructional Corps; Abelson & Co. (Engineers) Ltd.; Talyllyn Railway
- Numbers: TR: 6

Douglas is a narrow gauge steam locomotive. It was built by Andrew Barclay Sons & Co. Ltd. in 1918. It was originally used by the Air Service Constructional Corps (RAF) then was bought in 1949 by Abelson & Co. (Engineers) Ltd. who then sold it to the Talyllyn Railway in 1953.

== History ==
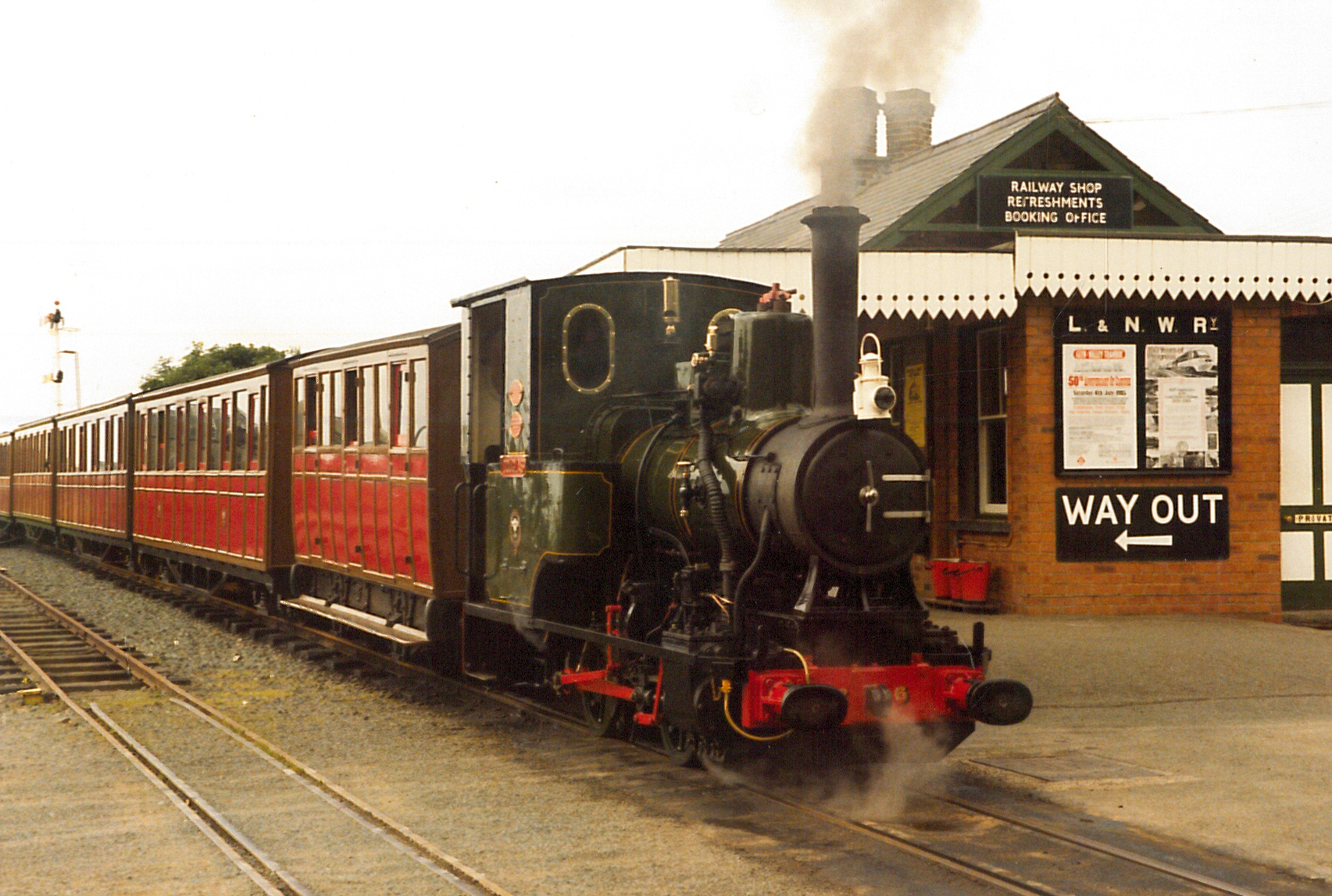
Douglas in Talyllyn green livery at Tywyn Wharf

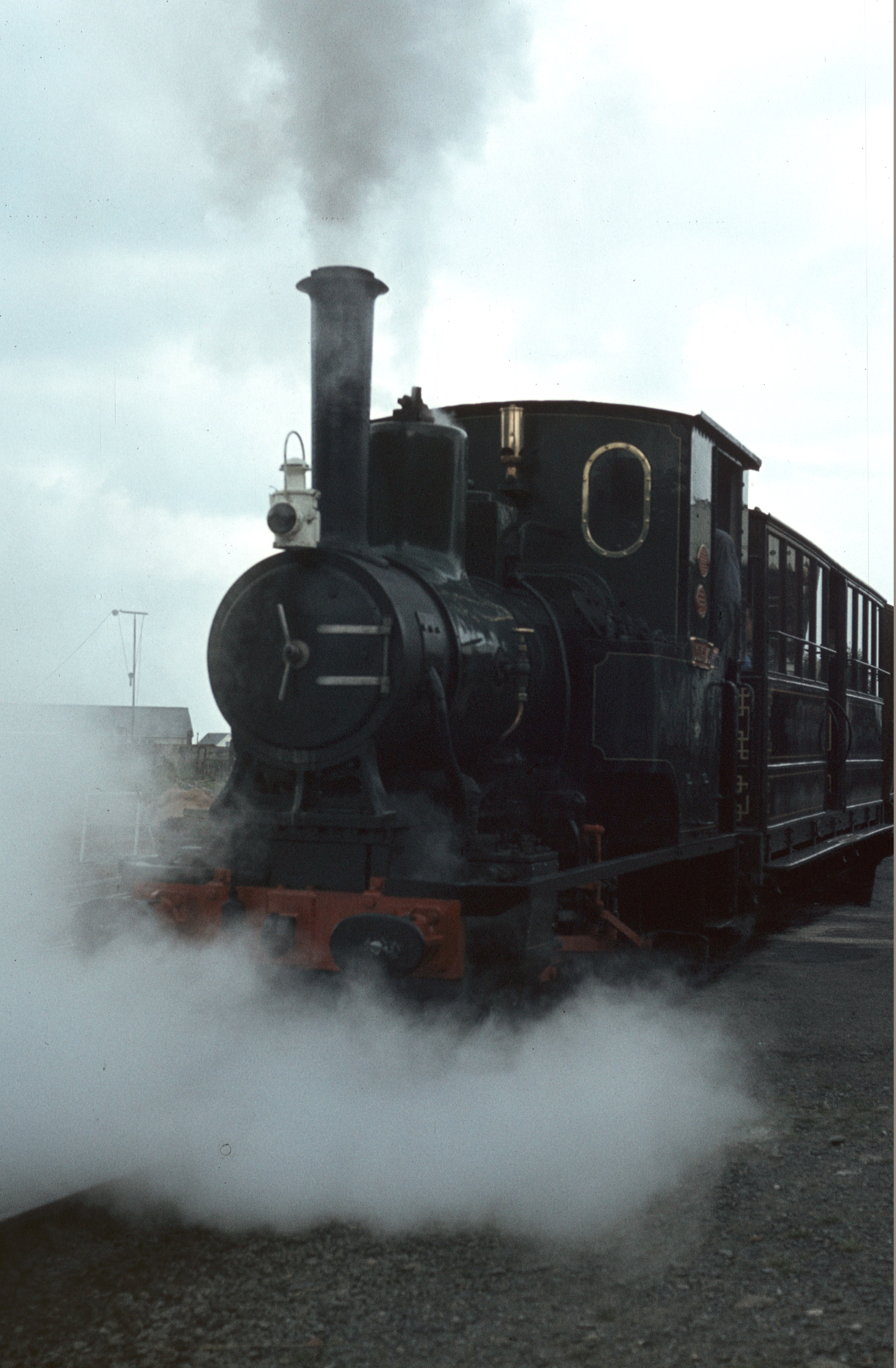
Douglas in July 1980

After being handed over to the RAF on 21 February 1918 the engine was first used at Manston by the Admiralty Air Construction Service. From October 1921 onwards Douglas spent most of its working life at RAF Calshot near Southampton. When the line ceased to be used in the aftermath of World War II the locomotive was placed in storage.

In April 1949 it was sold at auction for £60 by an engineering company called Abelson & Co (Engineers) Ltd. In the early days of preservation, the Talyllyn Railway had contacted this and other similar firms asking for redundant equipment. Abelson's offered the locomotive to the Talyllyn, and in return they named it after the donor, Douglas Abelson. After presentation in 1953 the locomotive was retubed and converted from 2ft gauge at Griffin Foundry, Oldbury (with the conversion being paid for by Abelson) before being taken by road to Tywyn. At the same time as the conversion the engine's buffers were changed from a single centred buffer at each end to pairs of buffers. The cab was also extended backwards by about 6 in (15 cm) to allow the engine's lever brake to be replaced by a screw brake.

Although smaller than the other locomotives on the Talyllyn Railway it has performed well, and was returned to service in 1995 with a new boiler fitted and repainted in its old Air Ministry Works & Buildings livery.

In more recent years Douglas has been painted in standard Talyllyn Railway livery of deep bronze green lined with black borders and yellow lining; however as of 2010 it was painted red, acting as Duncan from the fictional Skarloey Railway. In February 2018, to mark the centenary of both the locomotive and the RAF, it was painted RAF blue.

Douglas’s boiler ticket expired in January 2024 after which the engine was relocated to the Severn Valley Railway where it was placed on display in the engine house.

== In fiction ==
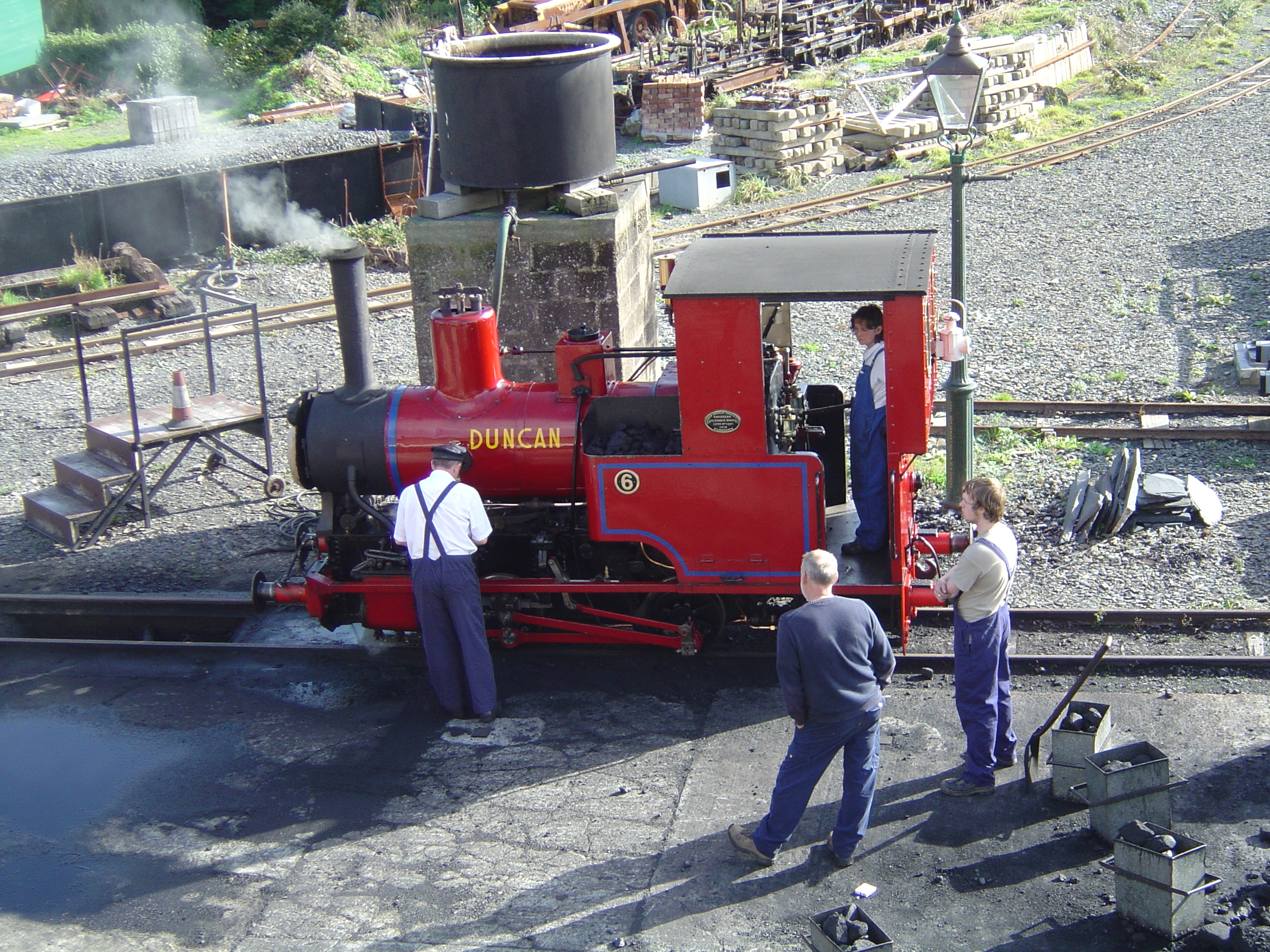
Douglas in its Duncan guise.

All the steam-operated engines on the Talyllyn Railway appeared many times in The Railway Series books by the Rev. W. Awdry on the Skarloey Railway. In this case, Douglas was the basis for the character “Duncan”.
