= Whitehill Junction railway station =

Railway station in Hampshire, England

Coordinates: 51.096°N 0.870°W

Whitehill Junction railway station is a former railway station, on the Longmoor Military Railway, which was closed along with the rest of the line in 1969. The station served the village of Whitehill, Hampshire. The station was featured in the films The Great St Trinian's Train Robbery.

Preceding station	Disused railways	Following station
Oakhanger Halt	Longmoor Military Railway	Two Range Halt

== See also ==
- List of closed railway stations in Britain
