= Liss Forest Road railway station =

Served the hamlet of Liss Forest in Hampshire, England, between 1933 and 1969

Liss Forest Road

General information
- Location: East Hampshire; England
- Coordinates: 51.058°N 0.886°W
- Platforms: 2

Other information
- Status: Disused

History
- Original company: Longmoor Military Railway

Key dates
- by 1933: station opened
- 31 October 1969: closed
Location

Liss Forest Road railway station served the hamlet of Liss Forest neighbouring the larger village of Liss, in Hampshire. It is situated adjacent to Forest Road which runs from the A3 to Liss Forest. The road was crossed by a level crossing controlled by a block post, the Army's name for a signal box, which was usually un-staffed unless training was in progress.

The station opened when the Longmoor Military Railway (LMR) extended its line to Liss, work started on the extension in 1924 and it was completed by August 1933.

The station had one platform with no facilities on the north side of the line which had a passing loop here, by 1963 the station is reported to have two platforms, it was the last station on Army property.

A fatal accident occurred near the station on 13 October 1956. Two trains were due to cross at the station's passing loop but one of them didn't continuing onto the single track section towards Weaversdown Halt where it collided head-on with the other train killing six people and injuring eight, one seriously.

The station was closed along with the rest of the line on 31 October 1969. After closure the track was removed, the station was demolished and the site is now a public footpath.

Preceding station	Disused railways	Following station
Weaversdown Halt	Longmoor Military Railway	Liss
