= Woolmer railway station =

Served the hamlet of Woolmer in Hampshire, England, between 1933 and 1969

Woolmer

General information
- Location: East Hampshire; England
- Coordinates: 51.085°N 0.879°W
- Platforms: 2

Other information
- Status: Disused

History
- Original company: Longmoor Military Railway

Key dates
- by 1933: station opened
- 31 October 1969: closed
Location

Woolmer railway station is a former railway station, on the Longmoor Military Railway which served the hamlet of Woolmer. The station was probably situated opposite the end of what is now Blackmoor Road, the station is shown as existing on a 1933 map but its precise location is not shown.

In 1948 the station had two low-level platforms with no facilities, (Note: The photo in Mitchell & Smith (1987) shows platforms opposite each other, but Farmer (1966) states they were staggered.) it was the station for the marshalling yard which varied in size over the years, peaking at around forty sidings. There was a block post, the Army's name for a signal box, controlling access to the yard from the double track which was usually worked as a single track using the up line.

The station was closed along with the rest of the line on 31 October 1969.

Preceding station	Disused railways	Following station
Two Range Halt	Longmoor Military Railway	Longmoor Downs
