= No 2 Range Halt railway station =

Railway station in Hampshire, England

No 2 Range Halt

General information
- Location: East Hampshire; England
- Coordinates: 51.089°N 0.874°W
- Platforms: 0

Other information
- Status: Disused

History
- Original company: Longmoor Military Railway

Key dates
- probably 1932: station opened
- 31 October 1969: closed
Location

No 2 Range Halt railway station is a former railway station, on the Longmoor Military Railway, serving No 2 range, it was sometimes known as Two Range Halt implying there were two ranges but the halt was only close to No 2 range.

The station probably opened in 1932, it is mentioned in the winter timetable as a request stop but is not mentioned in the summer 1932 timetable.

The station had no platforms or other facilities except for a block post, the Army's name for a signal box.

The station was closed along with the rest of the line on 31 October 1969.

Preceding station	Disused railways	Following station
Whitehill Junction	Longmoor Military Railway	Woolmer
