= Weaversdown =

Hill in Hampshire, England

Coordinates: 51.069°N 0.845°W

Weaversdown or Weavers Down is an area of high ground in Hampshire, England, situated 2 miles (3 km) to the west of Liphook. It neighbours the Longmoor Military Camp.

It formerly had a railway station on the Longmoor Military Railway, but the line was closed in 1969.
