= Weaversdown Halt railway station =

Disused railway station in England

Weaversdown Halt

General information
- Location: East Hampshire; England
- Coordinates: 51.070°N 0.860°W
- Platforms: 1

Other information
- Status: Disused

History
- Original company: Longmoor Military Railway

Key dates
- by 1933: station opened
- 31 October 1969: closed
Location

Weaversdown Halt railway station is a former railway station, on the Longmoor Military Railway, which served the eastern side of Longmoor Military Camp. The station did not appear on Ordnance Survey mapping throughout its life and did not have signs on the platform, it was variously known as Weaversdown, Weavers Down and Weaver Down sometimes with the additional Junction and sometimes with Halt.

The station opened when the Longmoor Military Railway (LMR) extended its line to Liss, work started on the extension in 1924 and it was completed by August 1933.

It is situated to the North of a branch curving away to the East and consisted initially of a passing loop with one platform built from sleepers being added later, there was a shelter and a block post, the Army's name for a signal box.

The station was closed along with the rest of the line on 31 October 1969.

Preceding station	Disused railways	Following station
Longmoor Downs	Longmoor Military Railway	Liss Forest Road
