= Woolmer =

Hamlet in Hampshire, England

Coordinates: 51.083889°N 0.879167°W

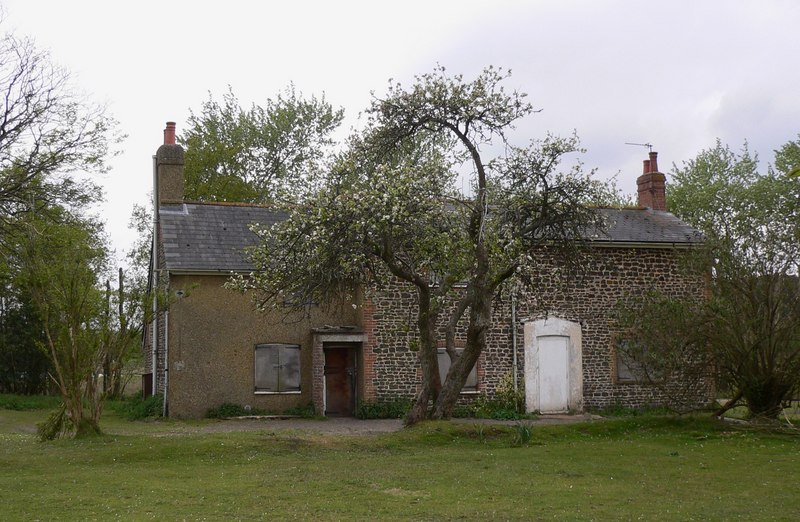
- Cottage next to Woolmer Pond

- Location within Hampshire
- OS grid reference: SU785322
- District: East Hampshire
- Shire county: Hampshire
- Region: South East
- Country: England
- Sovereign state: United Kingdom
- Post town: Bordon
- Postcode district: GU34
- Dialling code: 01420
- Police: Hampshire and Isle of Wight
- Fire: Hampshire and Isle of Wight
- Ambulance: South Central

Woolmer is a place in Hampshire, England. Woolmer is situated between Liphook and Bordon. The surrounding Woolmer Forest, a Royal forest, is both a Special Area of Conservation and a Site of Special Scientific Interest.

Woolmer was a tiny hamlet on the turnpike road, now the A325, running through the area from Farnham towards Portsmouth during the 19th century. All that remains, apart from the name of the forest, is a group of buildings to the east called Woolmer Cottages facing the Petersfield Road (A325) just south of the junction with Blackmoor Road. Across the road, on the south-western corner of the forest, there is Woolmer Pond and next to it, to its north, Woolmer Pond Cottage.

The name is still used in several other ways in the area: just to the south towards Greatham, the stretch of the A325 linking the roundabout to the A3 is called Woolmer Road, and to the north in Whitehill and Bordon there is the Woolmer Trading Estate accessed via Woolmer Way. Also some businesses and a doctors' surgery practice are named Woolmer in some way reflecting the historical place and the forest.

Woolmer formerly had its own railway station on the Longmoor Military Railway, but the line was closed in 1969.
