= Rowtor Target Railway =

Coordinates: 50.702343°N 3.992758°W

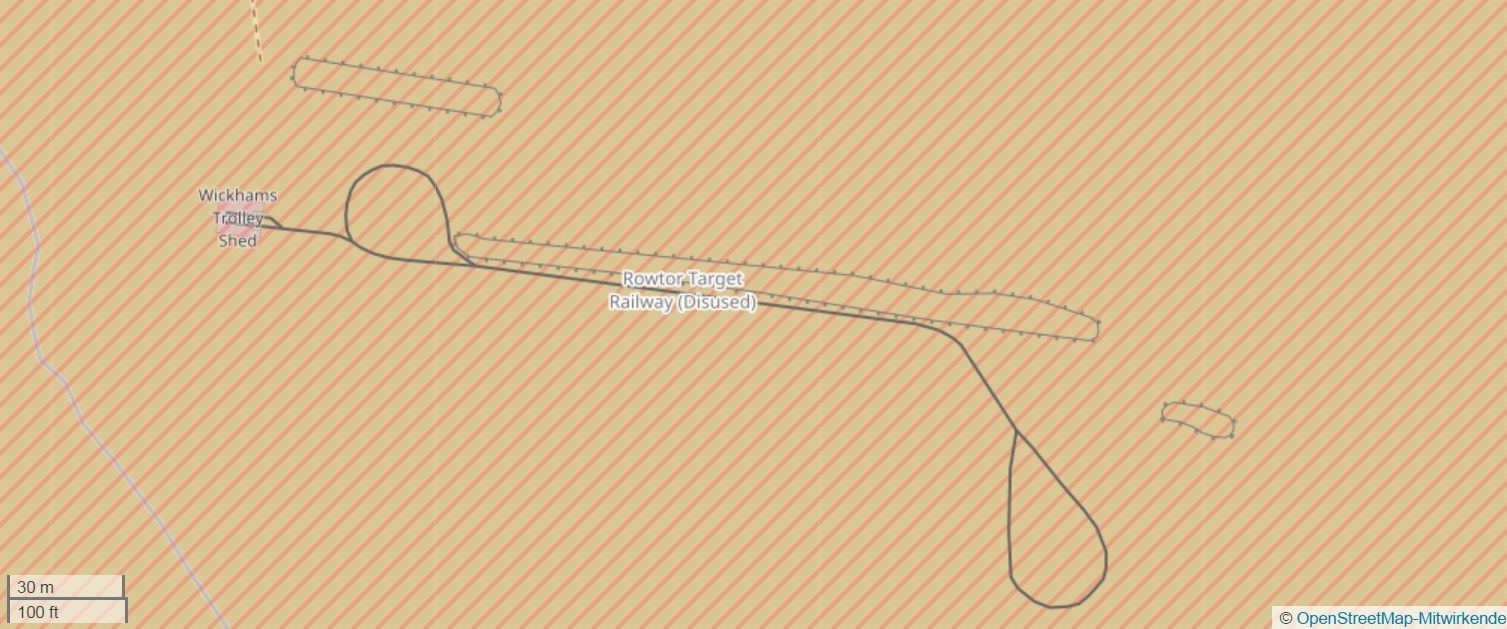
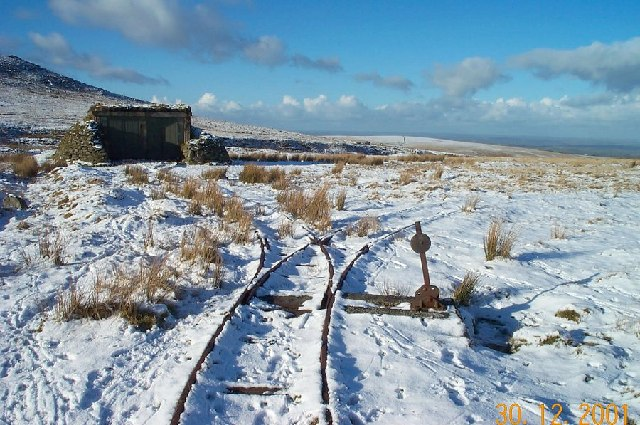
- Layout of the track Points and locomotive shed of the Rowtor Target Railway

Technical
- Line length: 450 m (500 yards)
- Track gauge: 24 inches (610 mm) (Category 610)

The Rowtor Target Railway was a military narrow gauge target railway south of Okehampton in Dartmoor, England, with a gauge of 24 inches (610 mm).

== History ==
The Rowtor Target Railway was built 1959 as a target railway based on an older target railway. The 1,480-foot (450 m) long track consists of a long straight section and one curve, to which balloon loops were added each end as well as a double track siding into the locomotive shed, in which an old Wickham trolley was stored. There are four points, which are still in a working order, because the track and the trolley are maintained by a group of railway enthusiasts.

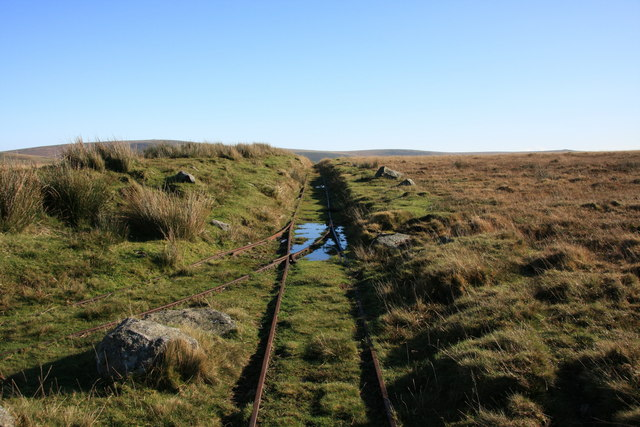
The trolley of the Rowtor Target Railway was protected against projectiles by the embankment

By the dumbbell shaped design with turning loops at either end, it was possible to run the unmanned trolley, onto which a wooden target in the shape of a military tank was fixed, continuously back and forth along track.
