= Longmoor Military Railway =

Former military railway in Hampshire, England

Coordinates: 51.0895°N 0.8302°W

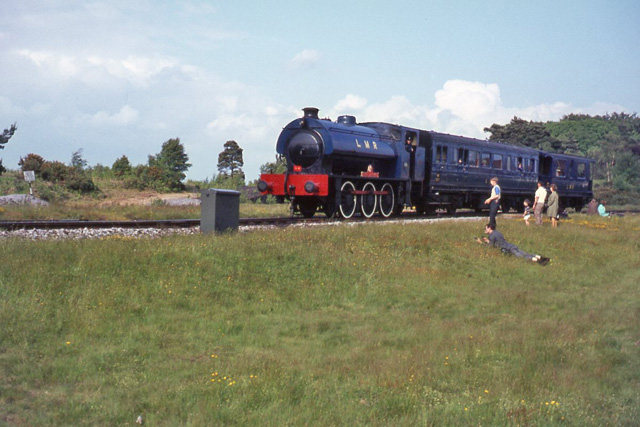
Hunslet Austerity 0-6-0ST on the Longmoor Military Railway in 1968

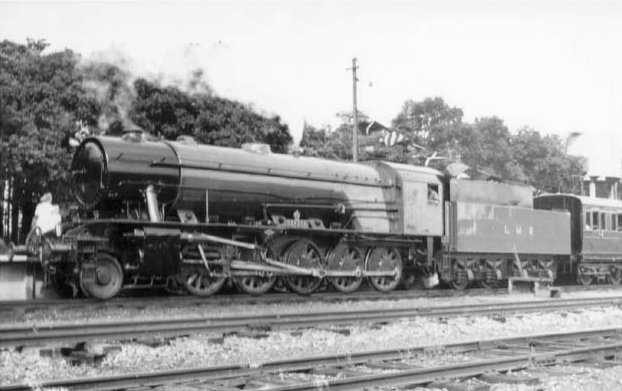
LMR 600 Gordon at Longmoor in 1949.

The Longmoor Military Railway (LMR) was a British military railway in Hampshire that was built by the Royal Engineers from 1903 to train soldiers on railway construction and operations. The railway ceased operation on 31 October 1969.

== Route ==
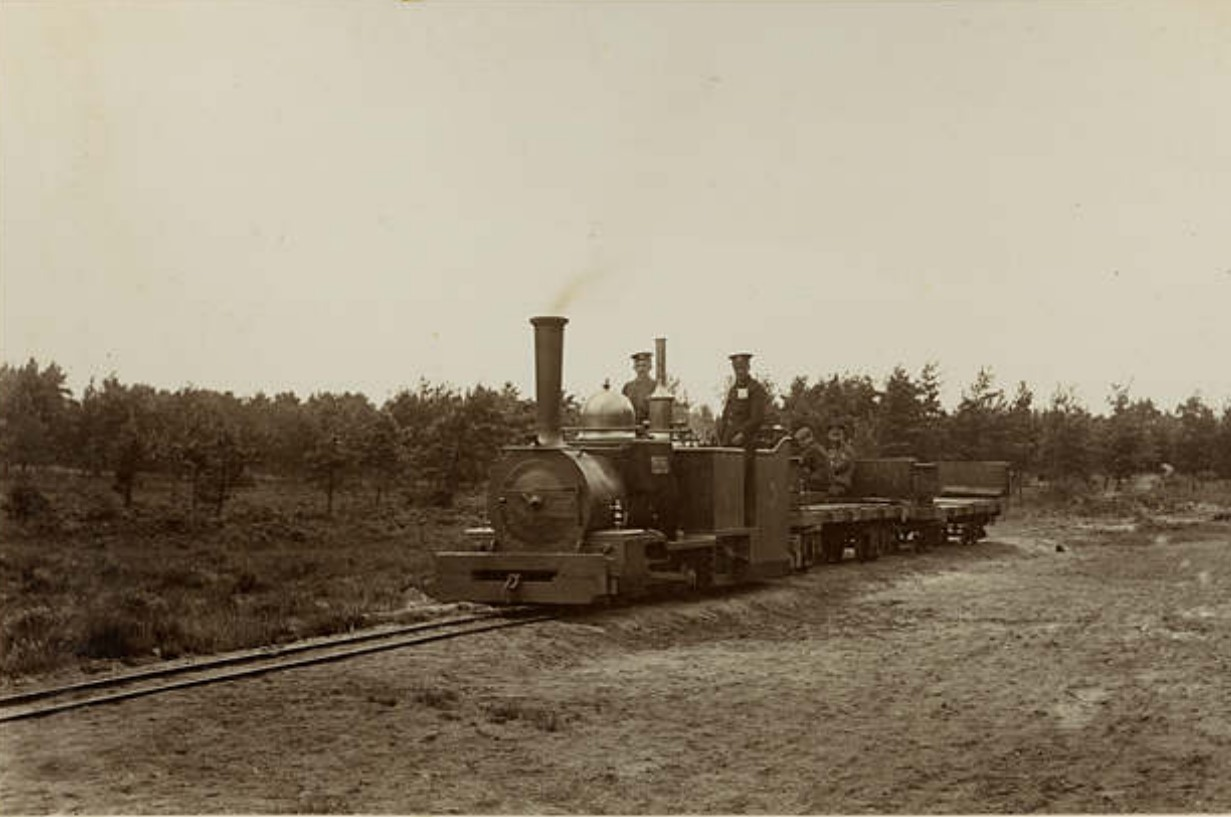
18 inch gauge military railway at Longmoor

Authorised for construction from 1902, activities date from 1903 when an 18 in (457 mm) gauge tramway was laid to assist in removing 68 large corrugated iron huts from Longmoor Military Camp to Bordon.

The railway was relaid to 4 ft 8 1/2 in (1,435 mm) standard gauge in 1905–1907 and was initially known as the Woolmer Instructional Military Railway. It was renamed the Longmoor Military Railway in 1935. The Liss extension was opened in 1933. The stations and junctions included:

- Bordon – the northern terminal, adjacent to Bordon station and with access to British Railways via the LSWR owned Bentley and Bordon Light Railway.
- Oakhanger Halt - serving the village of Oakhanger, Hampshire. Bordon station was nearer to Oakhanger and Oakhanger station was nearer to Bordon.
- Whitehill Junction - serving the village of Whitehill, Hampshire.
- Two Range Halt
- Woolmer - serving the hamlet of Woolmer.
- Longmoor Downs – the original terminus, and largest station on the line, serving the military camp.
- Weaversdown Halt – originally a passing place at the hamlet of Weaversdown, a station was constructed which served the eastern side of Longmoor Military Camp.
- Liss Forest Road - serving the hamlet of Liss Forest.
- Liss Junction – with access to the exchange sidings, and onwards into Liss British Railways goods yard.
- Liss – the southern terminus, with a platform adjacent to those serving the Portsmouth Direct Line (still running).

An additional loop ran eastwards from Longmoor camp via a station at Hopkins Bridge to Whitehill Junction, completed in 1942. This provided circular running to the line, allowing for improved training without the need to turn trains at the termini.

As a training railway, it was often being constructed/deconstructed. The layout would often change, and at one time housed a machine which could lay 1,500 yards (1,400 m) of track a day. At its peak, the railway ran to over 70 miles (110 km) of operational laid track and sidings.

== Operations ==
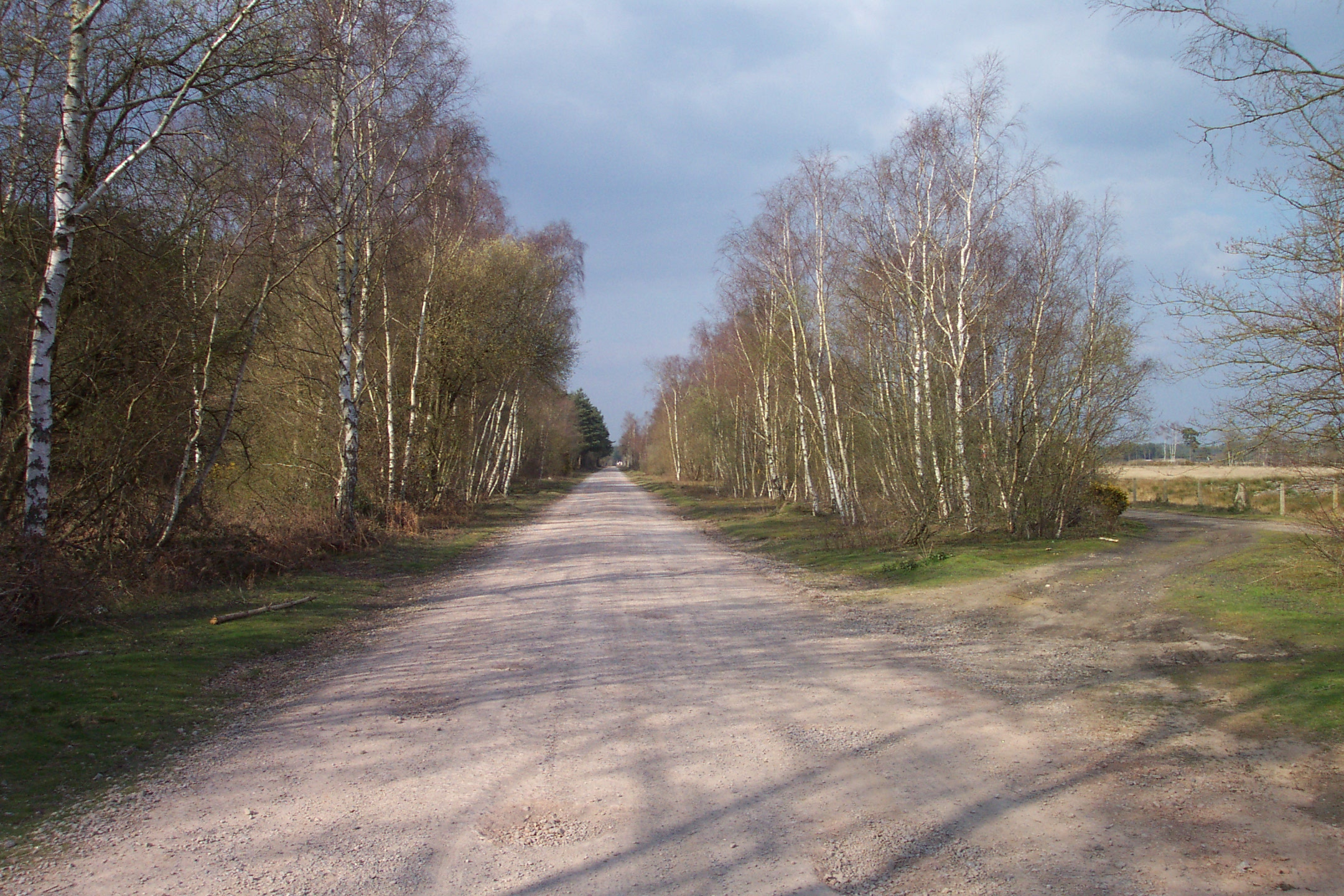
The trackbed of the Military Railway in 2007, looking north from near Woolmer

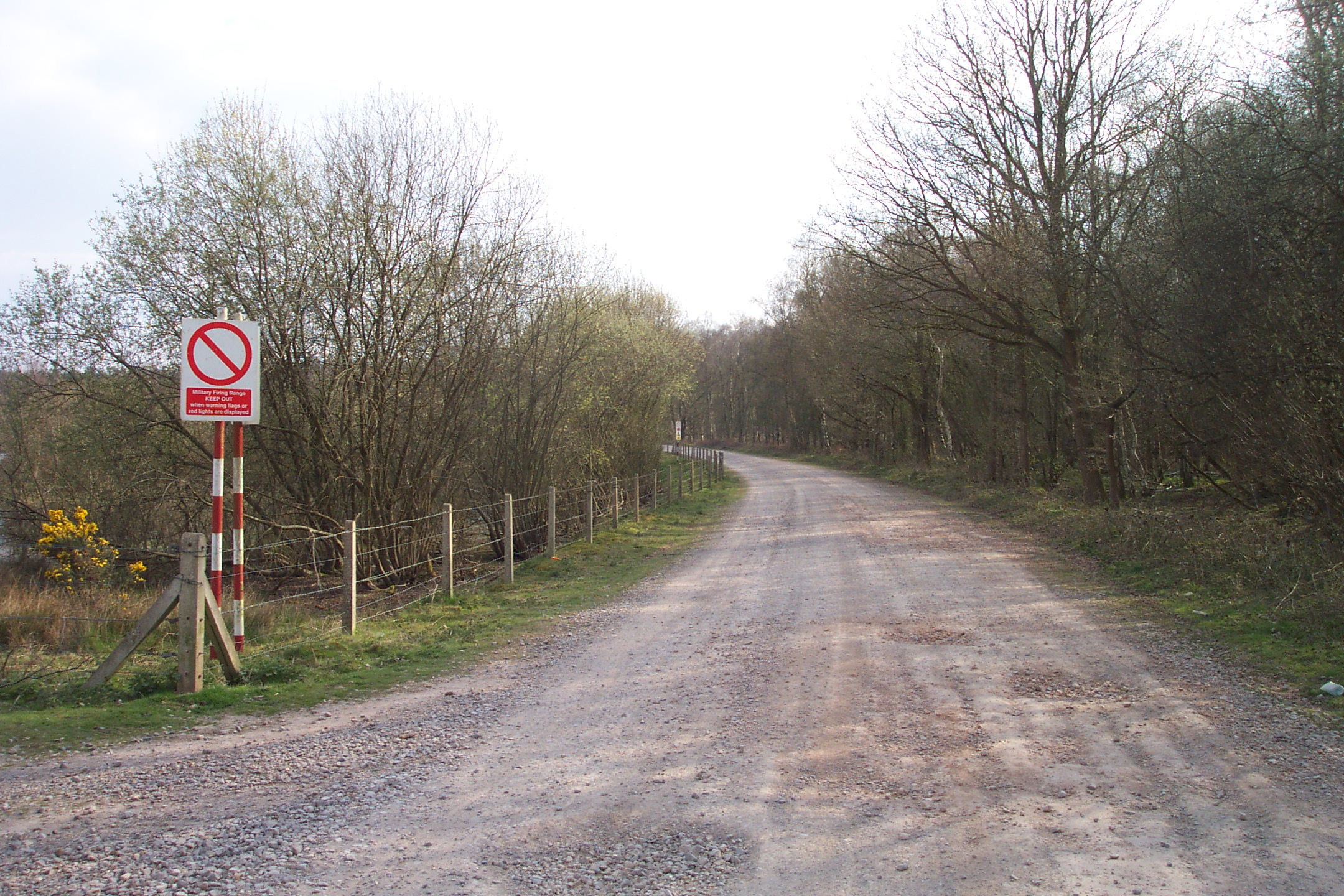
The trackbed looking the other way, with Longmoor Camp around the curve to the left

The vehicles and stock on the LMR were very much an assortment to give the maximum learning opportunity. Well over a thousand locomotives had associations with the railway, although many only through the need for storage. The same was true of the signalling at the various locations on the line, including an Army version of flag signalling. After the end of World War II, the collection also included captured enemy equipment, including a "Schienenwolf" or railroad plough: a German wagon which dragged behind it a huge hook, used to destroy sleepers and so render railway lines unusable to advancing enemy troops.

In addition to the various military items, there were old versions of standard passenger carriages. A passenger service was operated over the line at various times, nominally for personnel required on the railway, and others from the War Department/Ministry of Defence and their families.

There was only one fatal accident recorded on the line, which occurred in October 1956.

With a declining military role for railways both in Britain and the rest of the world, it was inevitable that the significance of the facilities offered by the LMR would be reduced in later years. Even so, the LMR was still important enough for the tracks of the Bentley to Bordon branch to be left in place when passenger services were withdrawn on 16 September 1957. This line remained in place as, although there was a British Railways connection at Liss, the Bordon branch made it easier to accommodate the movements of military traffic at short notice. In 1966, the movement of goods over the Bordon branch was suspended, and the line was taken up in 1967.

=== Railway Inspectorate ===
Among those who learned the workings of railways on the LMR, there were a select band who continued in railway-related work after leaving the services. These were the members of the Railway Inspectorate, whose remit is to enquire into the circumstances surrounding British railway accidents. The first Chief Inspecting Officer of Railways not to have been trained in the army was R. J. Seymour, appointed in 1988.

=== Locomotives ===
The following standard gauge locomotives were in use in 1914:

Name	Number	Type	Builder	Works No.	Date	Notes
Pyramus		0-6-2T	Hawthorn Leslie	2879	1911	ex-Shropshire and Montgomeryshire Railway. Transferred to the Kinmel Camp Railway in 1916. Sold in 1921. Later converted to 0-6-0T and by 1953 was working at NCB Nunnery Colliery. Scrapped 1962.
Thisbe		0-6-2T	Hawthorn Leslie	2878	1911	ex-Shropshire and Montgomeryshire Railway. Transferred to the Kinmel Camp Railway in 1916. Returned to Longmoor around 1917.
Sir John French		0-6-2T	Hawthorn Leslie	3088	1914	Supplied new. Transferred to the Kinmel Camp Railway in 1916. Returned to Longmoor after 1917.

The following standard gauge locomotives were present in 1947:

Name	Number	Type	Builder	Works No.	Date	Notes
Selbourne	70204	0-6-0T	Hawthorne Leslie	3531	1922	Out of use, 1947. Left Longmoor by 1948
Gordon	70205	0-6-2T	West Yard Works, Cardiff	WD205	1897	Last surviving Welsh standard-gauge locomotive ex Taff Vale Railway 'O1' class No.28. Purchased by Longmoor Military Railway in 1927. Sold to South Hetton Colliery, County Durham in 1947. Now part of the National Collection.
Marlborough	70207	0-6-2T	North Staffordshire Railway - Stoke	2253	1909	Out of use, 1947. ex London, Midland and Scottish Railway, purchased by the War Department in 1936
Kitchener	70208	0-6-2T	Bagnall	2587	1938	Out of use, 1947.
Daisy	70228	0-6-0ST	Peckett	1204	1910	Out of use, 1947.
Earl Roberts	72400	4-4-2T	Brighton Works		1908	Out of use, 1947. LB&SCR I2 class. ex-SR No. 2013
	72401	4-4-2T	Brighton Works		1908	Out of use, 1947. LB&SCR I2 class. ex-SR No. 2019
	70177	0-6-0	Swindon Works			Out of use, 1947. ex-GWR 2301 Class. Fitted for oil burning.
	70179	0-6-0	Swindon Works			Out of use, 1947. ex-GWR "2301" class.
	70195	0-6-0	Swindon Works			Out of use, 1947. ex-GWR "2301" class.
	70198	0-6-0	Swindon Works			Out of use, 1947. ex-GWR "2301" class.
Constantine	71443	0-6-0ST	Hunslet	3207	1945	Austerity class. War Department brown livery. Stored in Fitters School.
Brussels	71505	0-6-0ST	Hudswell Clarke	1782 *	1945	Oil-fired Austerity class. War Department brown livery.
Ahwaz	75028	0-6-0ST	Hunslet	2877	1943	Austerity class. War Department brown livery. Fitted with Westinghouse Brakes.
Foggia	75041	0-6-0ST	Hunslet	2890	1943	Austerity class. War Department brown livery. Fitted with Westinghouse Brakes.
Jullundur	75042	0-6-0ST	Hunslet	2891	1943	Austerity class. War Department brown livery. Fitted with Westinghouse Brakes.
Lisieux	75079	0-6-0ST	RSH	7115	1943	Austerity class. War Department brown livery. Fitted with Westinghouse Brakes.
Matruh	75275	0-6-0ST	RSH	7205	1945	Austerity class. War Department brown livery.
Foligno	75277	0-6-0ST	RSH	7207	1945	Austerity class. War Department brown livery.
Insein	75282	0-6-0ST	Vulcan Foundry	5272	1945	Austerity class. War Department brown livery.
Maj-Gen. Carl R. Gray Jr.	93257	2-8-0	ALCO	71512	1944	USATC S160 Class. later numbered as 700, Scrapped October 1957
Maj-Gen. McMullen	79250	2-8-0	Vulcan Foundry	5193	1945	Dark Blue Livery with Red Lining. Did Not Carry Number on naming ceremony, later numbered as 401, Scrapped 1957
Maj-Gen. Frank S. Ross	94382	0-6-0T	Davenport	2531	1943	USATC S100 Class. Dark Blue with Red Lining numbered as 300
Manipur Road	75290	0-6-0ST	Vulcan Foundry	5280	1945	Austerity class. Dark blue livery, lined with red and gold.

The following standard gauge locomotives were present in August 1963:

Name	Number	Type	Builder	Works No.	Date	Notes
Caen	102	0-6-0ST	Hunslet			Austerity class
Brussels	118	0-6-0ST	Hudswell Clarke	1782 *	1945	Oil-fired Austerity class
Tobruk	156	0-6-0ST				Oil fired Austerity class. Renamed McMurdo 1965.
Constantine	157	0-6-0ST	Hunslet	3207	1945	Austerity class, stored in Fitter's School in 1963. Back in use for the film The Great St Trinian's Train Robbery as mock LNER J50 no. 68961.
Sir Guy Williams	400	2-8-0	North British	25205	1943	Main passenger locomotive in 1963, scrapped 1967.
Gordon	600	2-10-0	North British	25437	1943	Now preserved on the Severn Valley Railway
Kitchener	601	2-10-0	North British	25643	1945	Under repair at Eastleigh Works in 1963, scrapped 1967.
Bari	876	350 h.p. shunter	Derby Works		1945	Under repair in Fitter's shop, 1963
Basra (Formerly Chittagong)	878	350 h.p. shunter	Derby Works		1945	Handled daily freight train in 1963
Hassan	8227	0-6-0 400 h.p. shunter	Ruston & Hornsby	468041	1962	Worked the early morning passenger service, 1963
	9033	Wickham Trolley		6857	1954	
	9034	Wickham Trolley		7397	1957	Under repair in Fitter's shop, 1963
	17		John Fowler & Co.	22912	1940	ex-Swynnerton Royal Ordnance Factory
	25 DM 51		Land Rover		1961	Converted Land Rover Mark 8 road vehicle (Rover Mark 8 is the military designation for the military 88" Series IIA)

A notable locomotive based on the LMR was 'Kingsley', an 1886-built 4-4-0 tank locomotive. This had formerly been locomotive No.10 of the Midland and Great Northern Joint Railway and was the last surviving locomotive from this company when scrapped in 1953.

=== Accidents and incidents ===
On 13 October 1956 a passenger train hauled by Class 8F 2-8-0 WD512 was involved in a head-on collision with a permanent way train hauled by 0-6-0 diesel shunter WD877 Bari between Weaversdown Halt and Liss Forest Road stations. Six soldiers who were in a brake van behind the diesel locomotive were killed and eight were injured. The cause of the accident was driver error on the part of the driver of the passenger train, who had entered the section without authority. This was compounded by the signalling arrangements at Liss Forest Road, where there was no trap point to prevent the train entering the section after passing a danger signal.

The signalling system at Liss Forest was single line telephone and ticket. The block man wrote out the ticket even though the work train was still in section. The ticket was exchanged for the one engine in steam key which controlled the section from Liss Forest to Liss. This saved the block man the trip of walking up the platform with the ticket after the work train had cleared. It was a misty day and the passenger train armed with the ticket passed the signal at red which then led to the fatal crash.

=== Closure ===
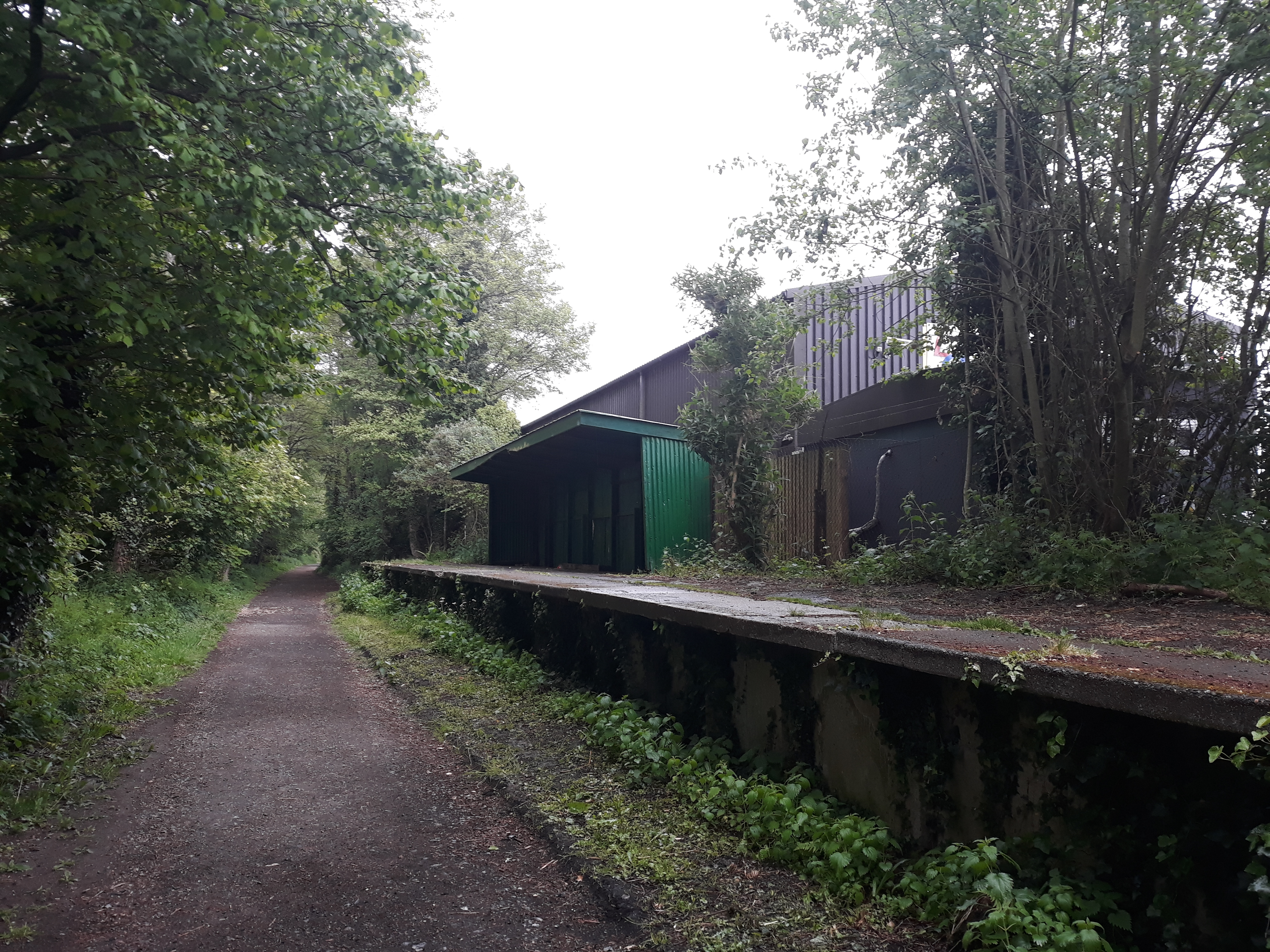
Disused platform at Liss

In the light of the reducing role of the military and the severely reduced British Empire, it was decided by the Ministry of Defence to close the railway. On hearing of its impending closure, local locomotive preservation groups became interested in acquiring the small but complete rail system, and a bid was placed to purchase LMR along with the airstrip at Gypsy Hollow which would have enabled the production of a unique transport museum. The MOD rejected this proposal, which had been backed by the Association of Railway Preservation Societies and The Transport Trust. However, the Army did offer the last 1½ miles of line from Liss Forest Road to Liss. The offer was accepted, a provisional lease was drawn up and planning permission was sought for developments at Liss.

Unfortunately, the people of Liss did not share this enthusiasm and opposed the planning permission. Several residents raised £9,100 in a successful bid to buy this last piece of line. Longmoor Military Railway closed down with a ceremonial last day of operation on 31 October 1969, though for another two years some locomotives and stock remained on site, and there were occasional movements. Three items of rolling stock (a van, a brake van, and a bogie flat) still remain on the Longmoor site, as part of the FIBUA training village.

=== Preservation ===
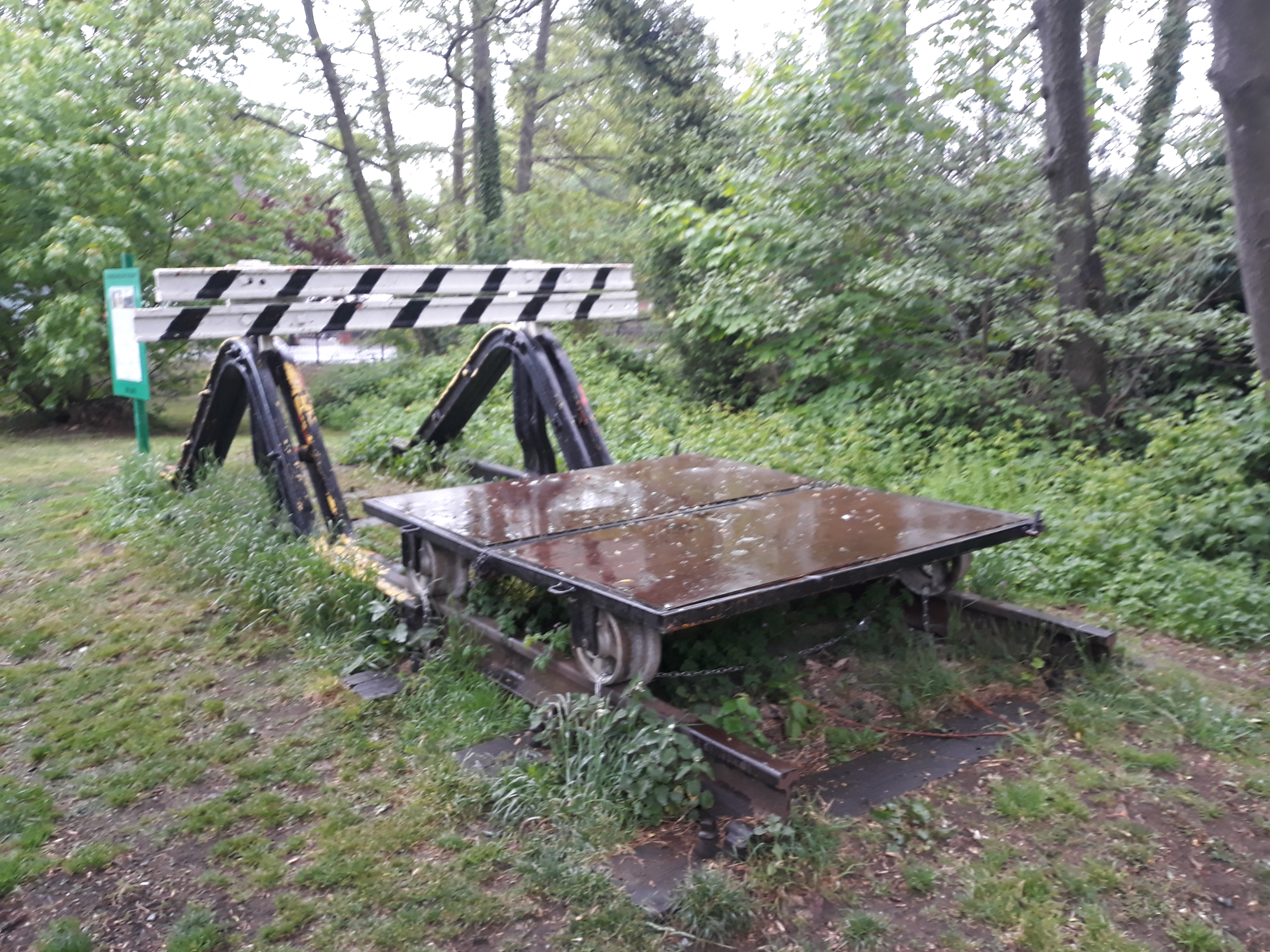
Preserved buffers in Liss

Some of the stock of the LMR did pass into the hands of preservationists, for example Hunslet Austerity 0-6-0ST No.118 Brussels to the Keighley and Worth Valley Railway, and many relics went to the Museum of Army Transport at Beverley, Yorkshire, itself since closed, with the exhibits transferred to care of the National Army Museum, although mostly held in storage. WD Austerity 2-10-0 locomotive LMR 600 Gordon, resident on the Severn Valley Railway for many years, was donated to the SVR by the National Army Museum in 2008.

==== Preserved ex-LMR locomotives ====
Some of the Hunslet Austerity tanks were only ever at Longmoor for storage, and were not used operationally there.

Name	Location	Owner	Notes
LMR 600 Gordon (WD Austerity 2-10-0)	Severn Valley Railway	SVR	
LMR 500 (Stanier 8F 2-8-0)	Severn Valley Railway	Stanier 8F Locomotive Society	Later BR no. 48773
Woolmer (Avonside 0-6-0ST)	Milestones Museum, Basingstoke	NRM	
WD192 Waggoner (Hunslet Austerity 0-6-0ST)	Isle of Wight Steam Railway	Isle of Wight Steam Railway	
WD118 Brussels (Hunslet Austerity 0-6-0ST)	Keighley & Worth Railway	KWVR	On Display at Oxenhope
WD196 Errol Lonsdale (Hunslet Austerity 0-6-0ST)	Belgium, stoomcentrum Maldegem	Privately Owned	
WD197 Sapper (Hunslet Austerity 0-6-0ST)	Kent & East Sussex Railway	KESR	
WD152 Rennes (RSH Austerity 0-6-0ST)	Dean Forest Railway	Privately Owned	
WD107 Foggia (Hunslet Austerity 0-6-0ST)	Ribble Steam Railway	Ribble Steam Railway	Converted to Tender Loco, previously named 'Douglas'
WD200 (Hunslet Austerity 0-6-0ST)	Colne Valley Railway	CVR	
WD610 General Lord Robertson (Sentinel 0-8-0DH)	Peak Rail (Darley Dale)	Privately owned	
WD878 Basra 350 h.p. shunter	Lakeside and Haverthwaite Railway	Lakeside and Haverthwaite Railway	
Gazelle (Dodman & Co. 0-4-2WT)	The Colonel Stephens Railway Museum	NRM	

==== Preserved locomotives at Longmoor ====
With the withdrawal of locomotives from British Railways, a number were being bought by private individuals and groups who subsequently needed somewhere to store their purchases. In 1967 a group was formed called the 'Association of Railway Preservation Societies' (ARPS) and they were able to come to an agreement with the Army that allowed such locomotives to be stored at Longmoor for a nominal fee. The following locomotives were all included in this agreement.

Number / Name	Class	Owner	Notes
SR 21C123 Blackmoor Vale	SR West Country	Bulleid Pacific Preservation Society	
BR 35028 Clan Line	SR Merchant Navy	Merchant Navy Preservation Society	
BR 41298	LMS Class 2MT 2-6-2T	Ivatt Locomotive Trust	
BR 75029 The Green Knight	BR Standard Class 4 4-6-0	Shepherd Railway Preservation Trust	Named upon arrival at Longmoor
BR 92203 Black Prince	Class 9F	Shepherd Railway Preservation Trust	Named upon arrival at Longmoor
AB 1398 of 1915 Lord Fisher	Andrew Barclay Sons & Co	B.G. Buckfield Esq	
BR 30064	SR USA Class	Southern Loco Preservation Co. Ltd.	Arrived at Liss after the site's Military function had ended.

== In popular culture ==
The railway was used as the location for a number of films, including The Lady Vanishes (1938), The Interrupted Journey (1949), Bhowani Junction (1956), The Inn of the Sixth Happiness (1958), Runaway Railway (1965), The Great St Trinian's Train Robbery (1966), The Magnificent Two (1967) and Chitty Chitty Bang Bang (1968). It also appeared in the Marty Feldman comedy sketch "The loneliness of the long distance golfer"(1968).

In February 1956, the railway was used to stage a train derailment for the BBC programme Saturday Night Out, when ex-SR King Arthur class locomotive 30740 "Merlin" and three coaches were pushed down an incline onto a specially canted section of track.

== Gallery ==
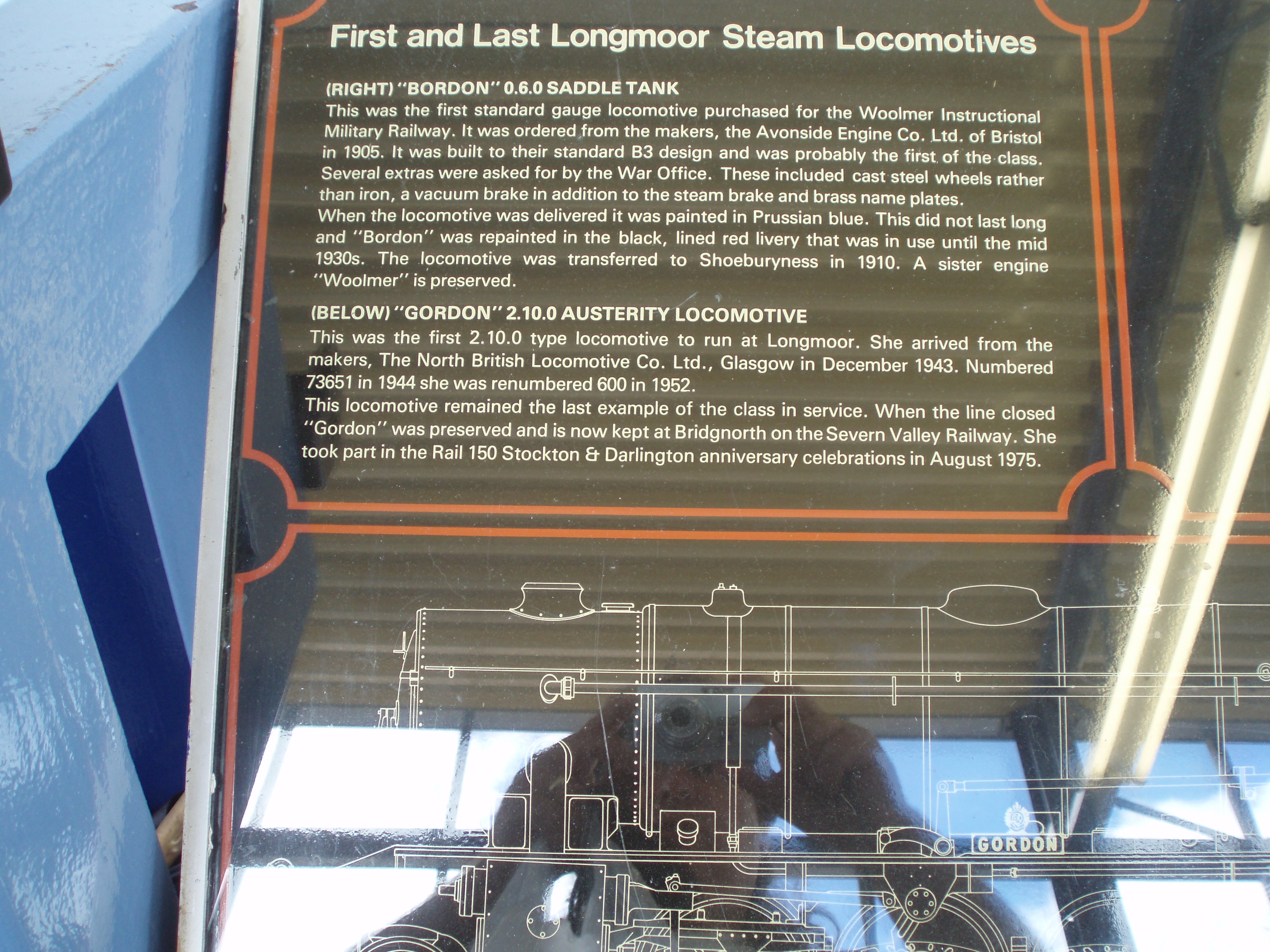
Montage on display at Liss railway station

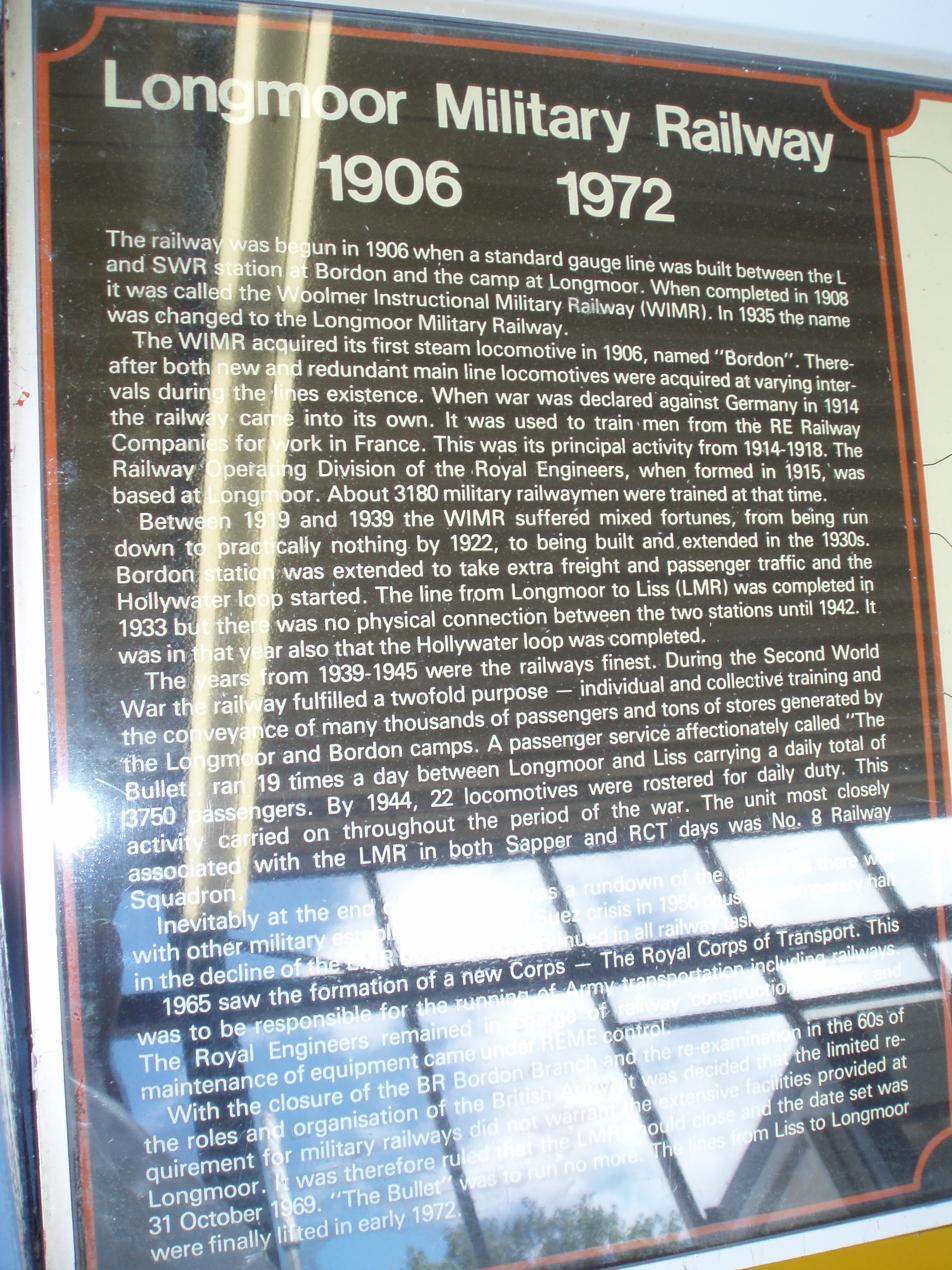

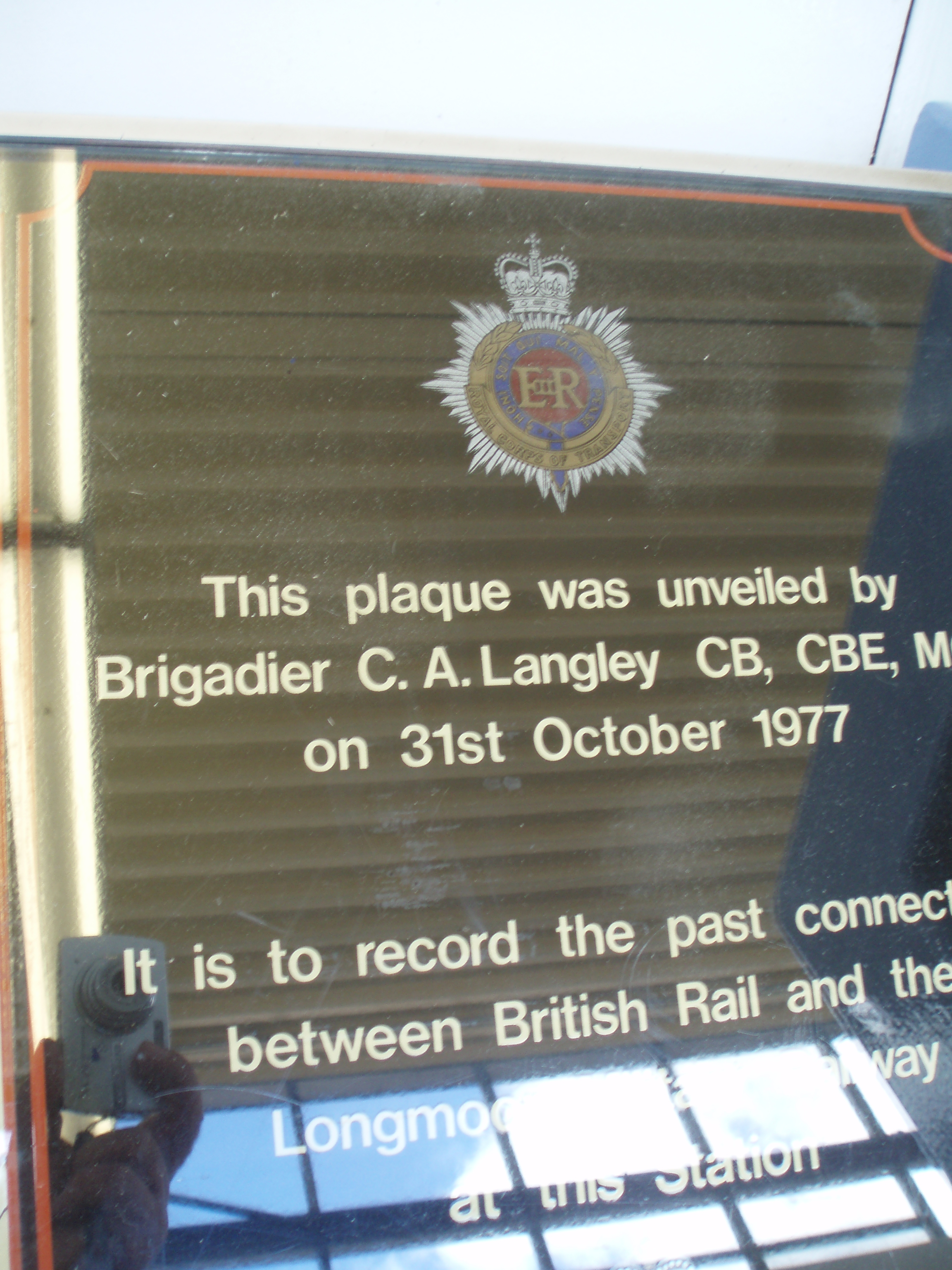

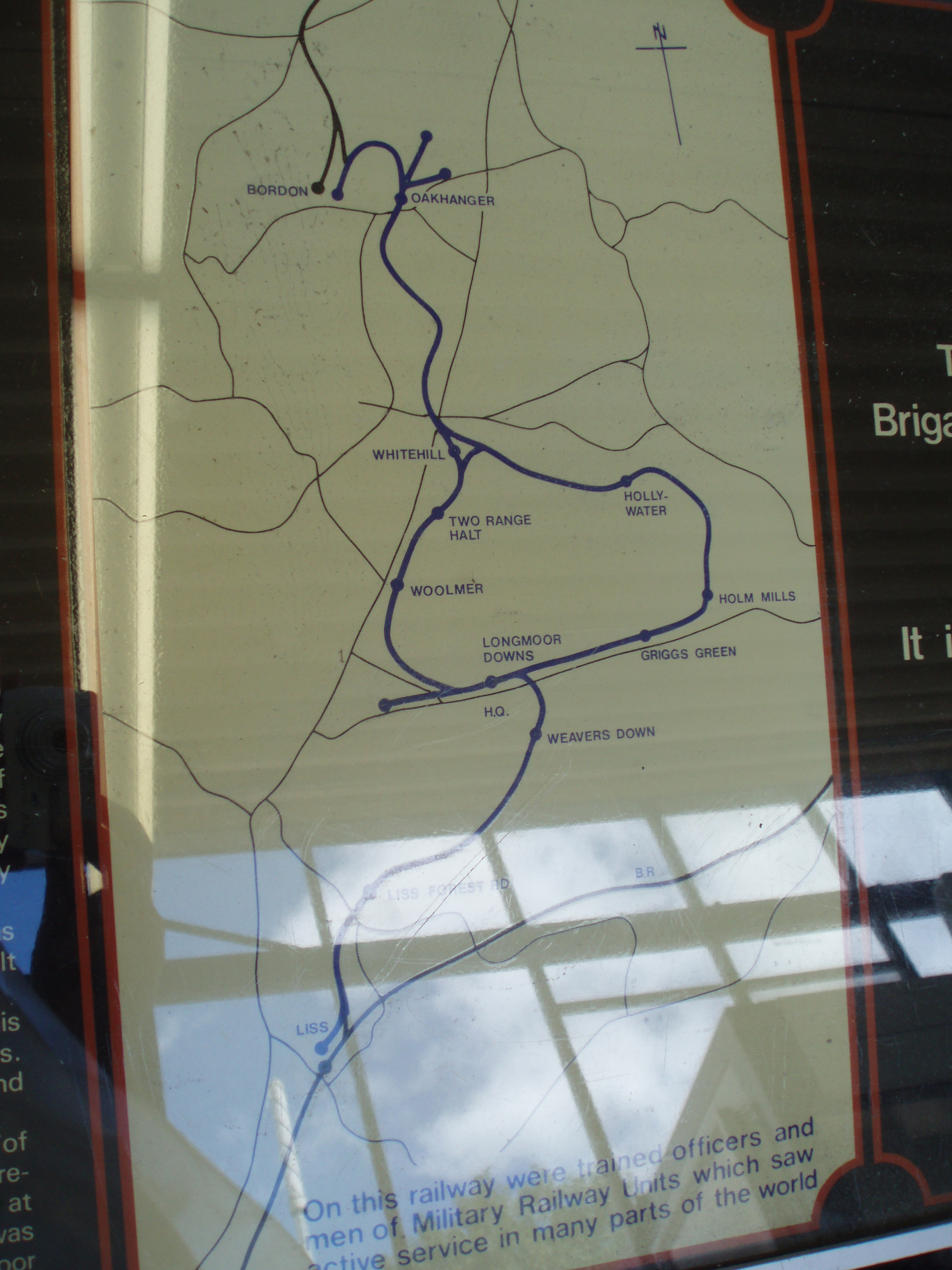

== See also ==
- Melbourne Military Railway – Derbyshire
