= Liss railway station =

Railway station in Hampshire, England

Liss
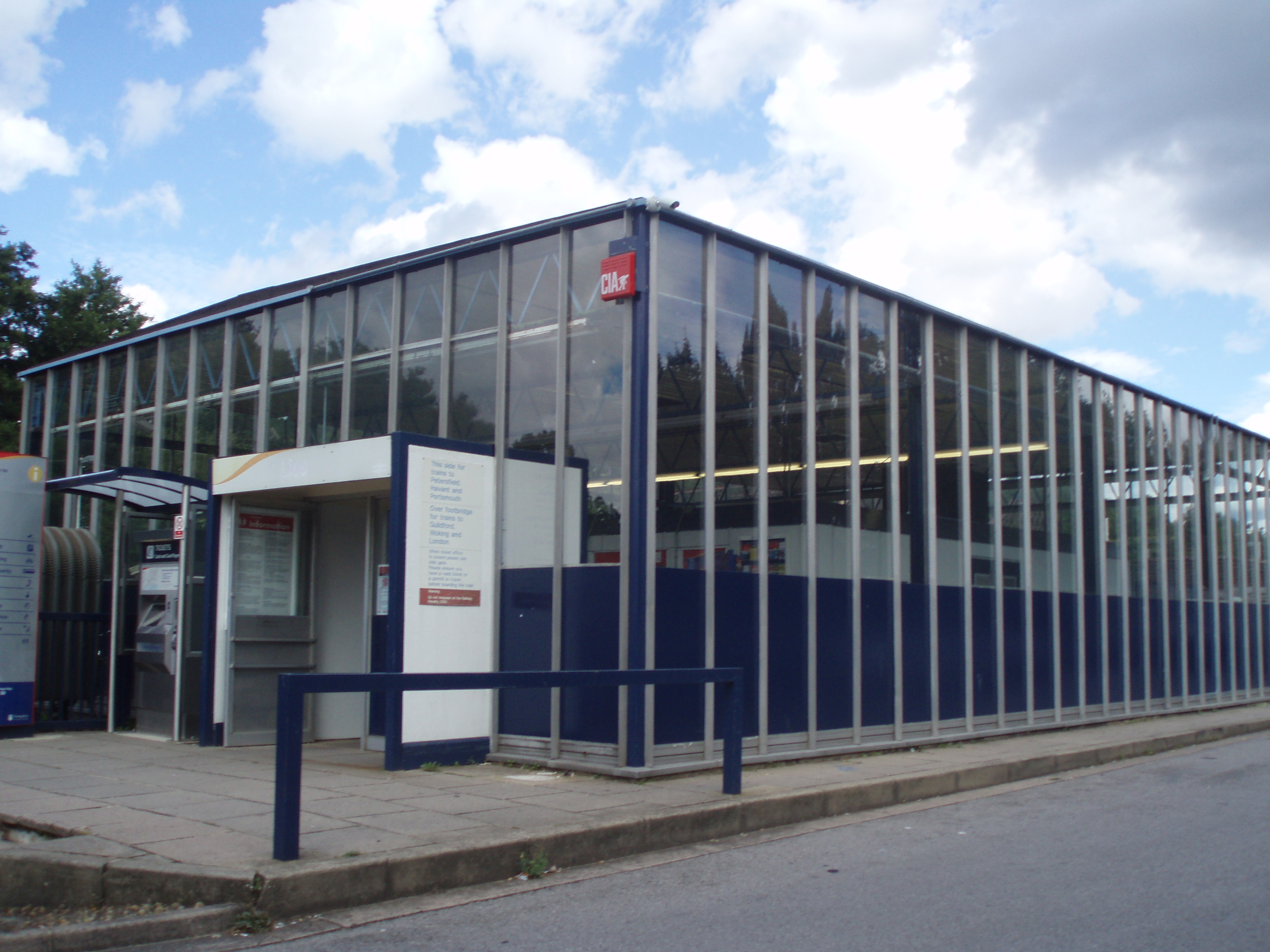

General information
- Location: Liss, East Hampshire; England
- Coordinates: 51°02′38″N 0°53′35″W
- Grid reference: SU777277
- Manager: South Western Railway
- Platforms: 2

Other information
- Station code: LIS
- Classification: DfT category D

History
- Opened: 1 January 1859

Passengers
- 2020/21: ▼0.148 million
- 2021/22: ▲0.237 million
- 2022/23: ▲0.268 million
- 2023/24: ▲0.278 million
- 2024/25: ▲0.308 million
Location
Notes
- Passenger statistics from the Office of Rail and Road

Liss railway station is a stop on the Portsmouth Direct Line, serving the village of Liss in Hampshire, England, 51 miles 35 chains (82.8 km) down the line from London Waterloo via Woking. As a small station, for most of the day there is one train each way (to Portsmouth and London) an hour. The station is managed by South Western Railway, which operates all trains serving it.

The station had a platform adjacent to the main line, which was the southern terminus of the Longmoor Military Railway. The former station goods yard connected to the LMR via Liss Junction. The footbridge was replaced on the night of 1/2 April 1967 by the ex-London, Brighton and South Coast Railway bridge from the former Cranleigh railway station.

== Services ==
All services at Liss are operated by South Western Railway using Class 444 and 450 EMUs.

The typical off-peak service in trains per hour is:

- 1 tph to London Waterloo via Guildford
- 1 tph to Portsmouth & Southsea

During the peak hours, there are additional services to London as well as services to Portsmouth Harbour. There is also one late evening service to Southampton Central.

Preceding station	National Rail	Following station
Liphook	South Western Railway Portsmouth Direct Line	Petersfield
	Disused railways	
Liss Forest Road	Longmoor Military Railway	Terminus

== Gallery ==
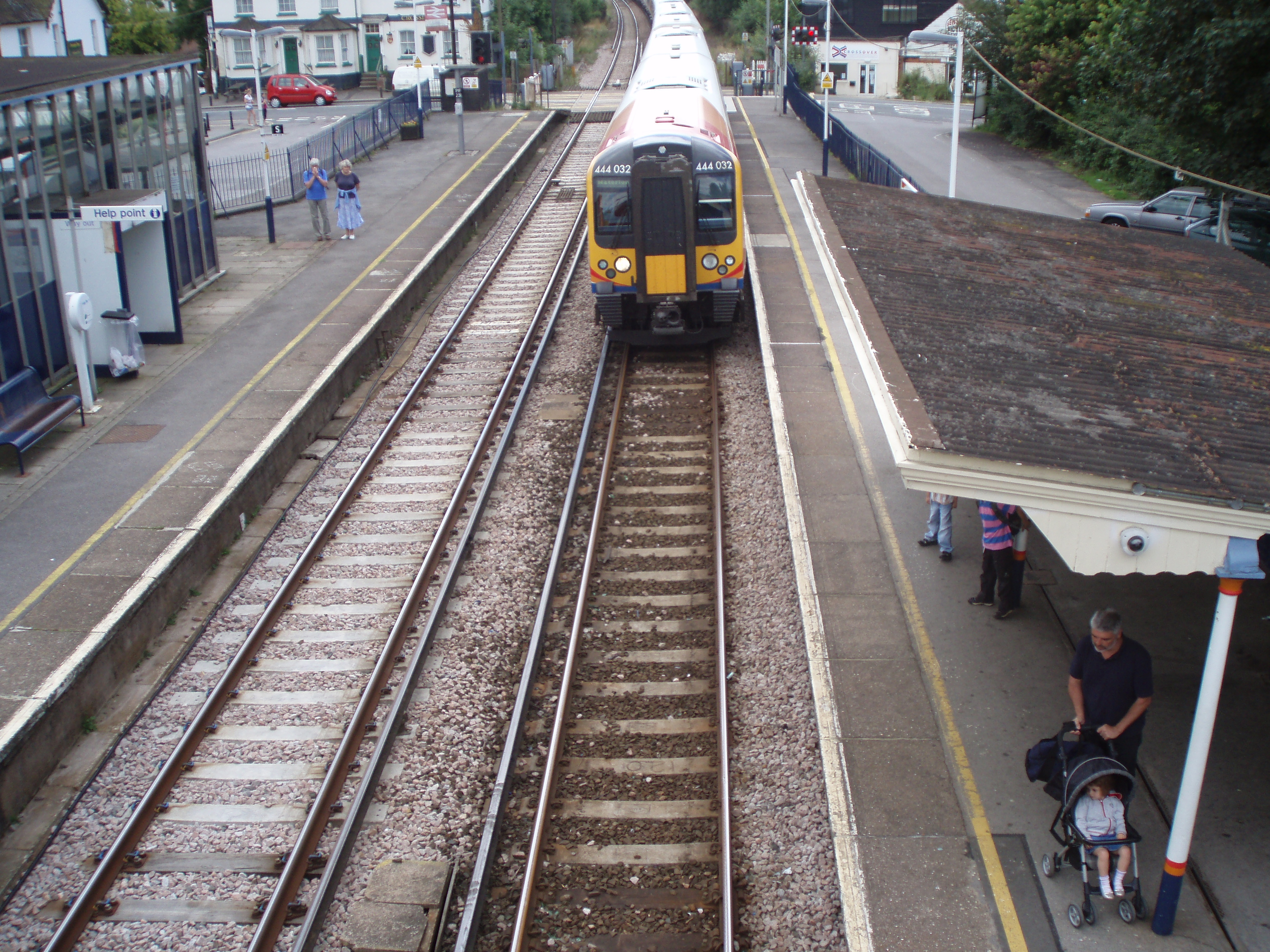

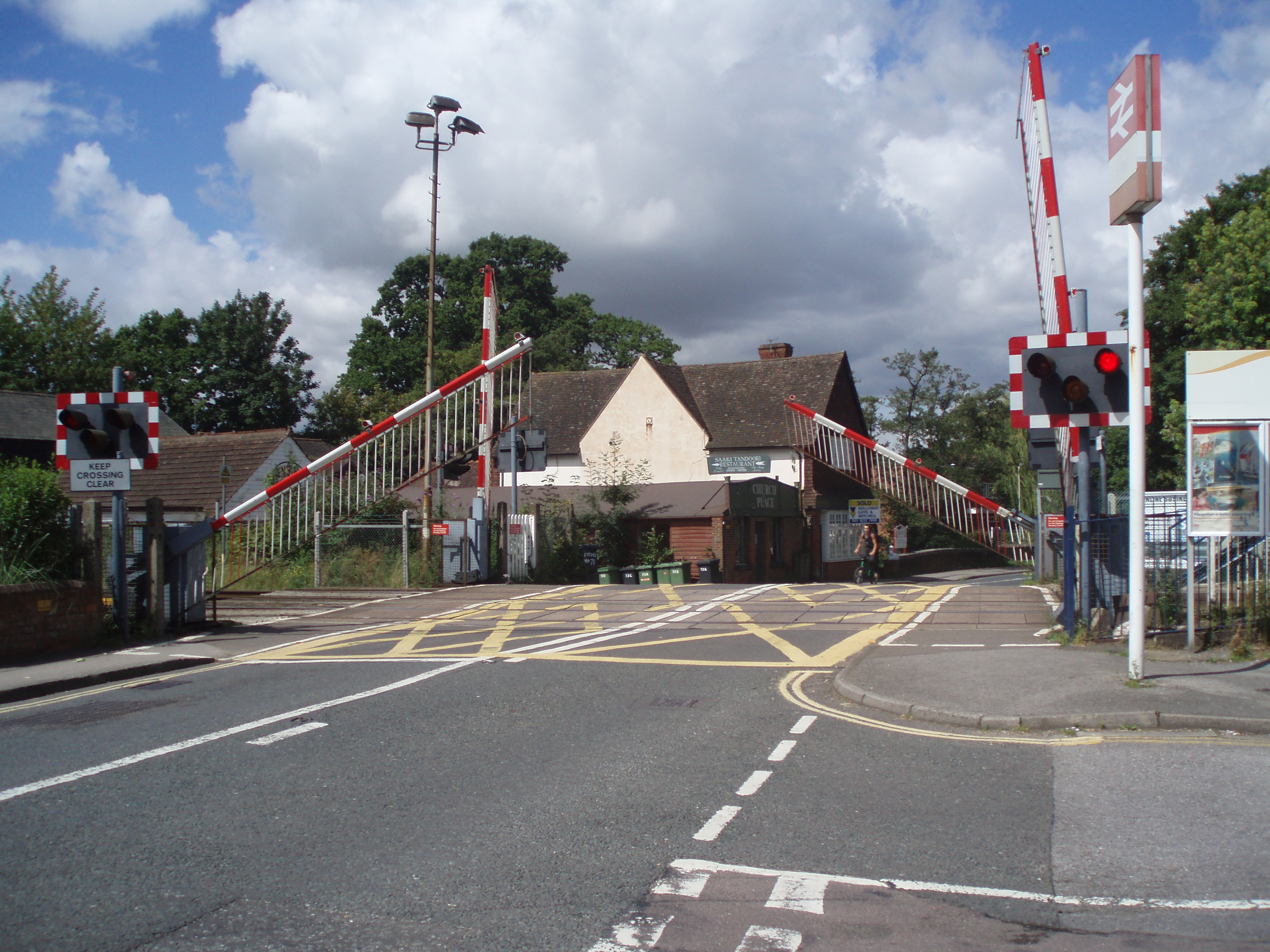

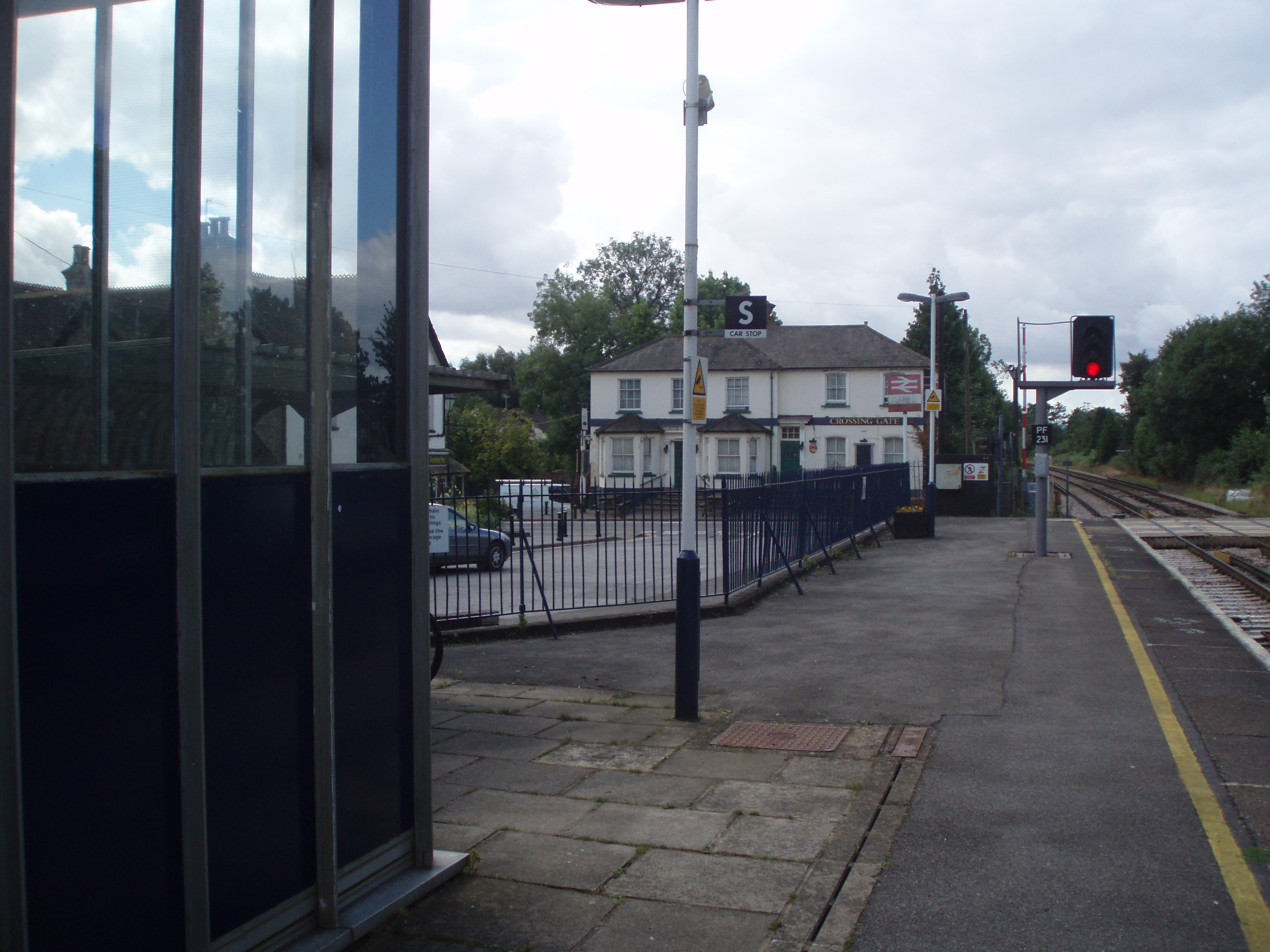

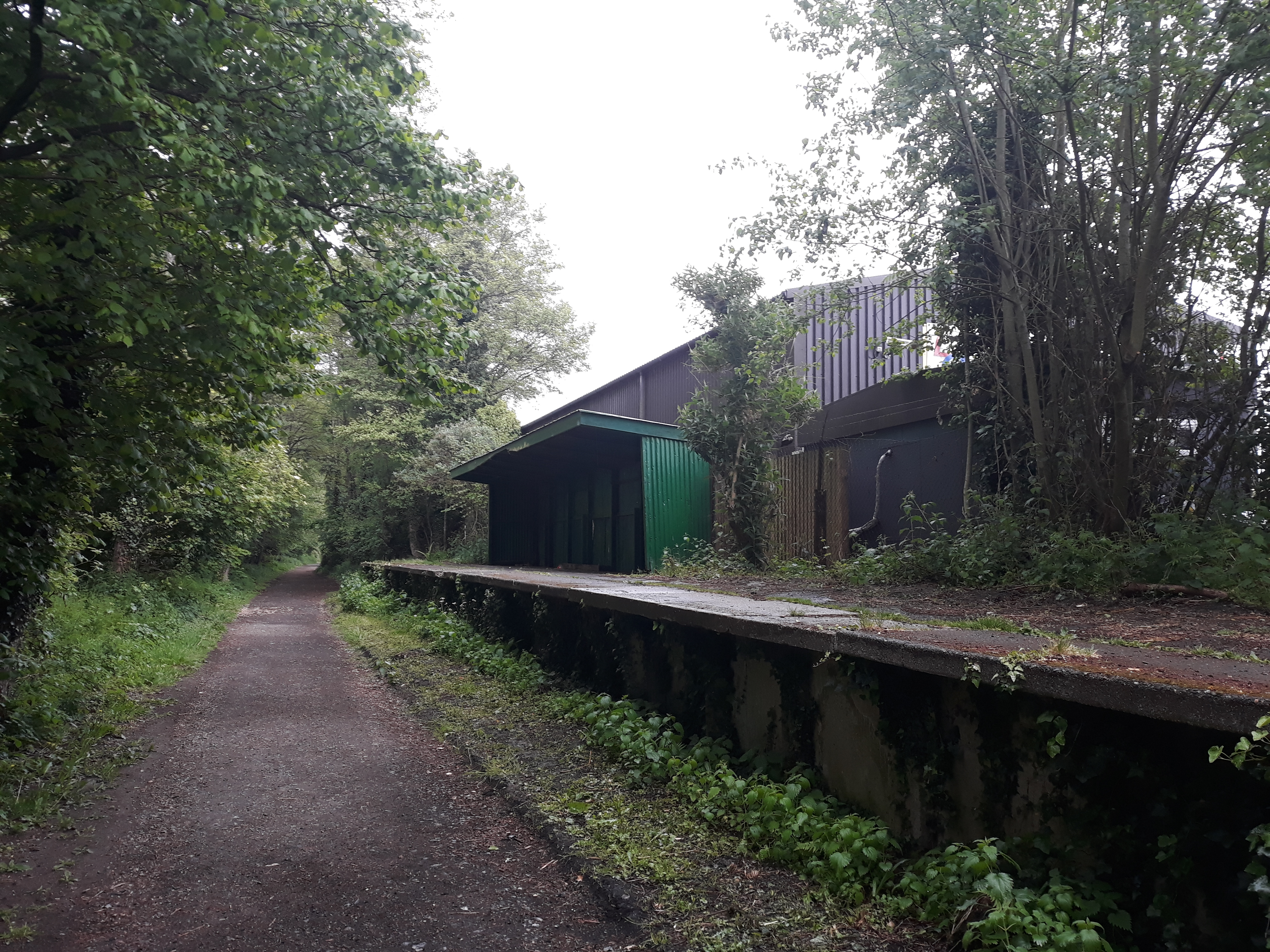
Longmoor Military Railway platform
