= Blakeslee =

Blakeslee is a surname. Notable people with the surname include:

- Albert Francis Blakeslee (1874–1954), botanist
- Dennis A. Blakeslee (1856–1933), American politician
- Dick Blakeslee (1921–2000), professor
- Donald Blakeslee (1917–2008), fighter pilot
- Ephraim Blakeslee, American politician
- George Hubbard Blakeslee (1871–1954), historian
- Howard W. Blakeslee (1880–1952), American journalist
- Mermer Blakeslee, writer in the Catskills, New York
- Sam Blakeslee (born 1955), former California State Senator (R-San Luis Obispo)
- Sandra Blakeslee, science correspondent
- Sarah Blakeslee (born 1985), sport shooter
- Sarah Blakeslee (painter) (1912–2005), landscape and portrait painter
- Susanne Blakeslee (born 1956), voice actress

== Places in the United States ==
- Blakeslee, Ohio
- Blakeslee, Pennsylvania

Stadiums

- Blakeslee Stadium, Mankato, Minnesota
