= Albert Henry Ross =

English advertising agent and freelance writer (1881-1950)

- Born: 1 January 1881; Kings Norton, Worcestershire, England
- Died: 14 September 1950 (aged 69); Headley Down, Hampshire, England
- Other name: Frank Morison
- Occupations: advertiser, writer
- Known for: writing the book Who Moved the Stone?

Albert Henry Ross (1 January 1881 – 14 September 1950), (pseudonym Frank Morison), was an English advertising agent and freelance writer known for writing the Christian apologetics book Who Moved the Stone? and And Pilate Said.

== Biography ==
Ross was born on 1 January 1881 in Kings Norton, Worcestershire just slightly south of Birmingham. His father, John Charles Ross (1838–1914) was a wine merchant who operated different businesses in Birmingham. His mother was Mary Ann Ross (née Marshall) and she was born in Hollingbourne, Kent in 1850. His parents were married in 1878. His mother died in Aston, Birmingham in 1912, and his father died in Aston, Birmingham in 1914.

It is understood that Ross attended the Grammar School of King Edward VI in Stratford-upon-Avon, England. According to the 1901 census he was living with his parents and older brother Percy Charles Ross in Birmingham and his occupation was that of a printer compositor. He worked for Lever Brothers until 1910, then joined advertising agents S. H. Benson of Kingsway. He managed the printing department and became a director in 1936. After his retirement in 1947 he became an honorary fellow of the Institute of Incorporated Practitioners in Advertising.

Alongside his professional career as a printer and advertiser, he wrote seven books as well as some articles that were all published under the literary pseudonym of Frank Morison. His publications did not contain any author or publisher's blurb that described his professional credentials or occupation. During the 1930s some book reviewers formed an impression that he must be a lawyer. This impression emerged after the publication of his book Who Moved the Stone? The claim that he was a lawyer was investigated by Ross Clifford, the Australian theologian and former barrister, and he established that Morison/Ross was never licensed in England to be either a solicitor or a barrister.

In 1916 he enlisted in the Royal Flying Corps serving as an instructor in aerial bombing as well as working in the general administration of the Air Ministry's Directorate of Intelligence (also known as MI7). He was appointed to a temporary commission as a second lieutenant in June 1918. After the War he returned to work at Benson's advertising agency. Apart from his work as an advertiser and author, he was a keen colour cinematographer and amateur astronomer. He married Annie Elizabeth Mills in 1915 in Birmingham. In 1917 their only daughter, Margaret Lilian Ross, was born in Birmingham. According to the obituary in The Times he died on 14 September 1950 at his home in Headley Down, Hampshire. He was buried in the church grounds of St. Luke Anglican Church, Grayshott, East Hampshire on 18 September 1950.

== Writing ==
Ross's first book, which was published in 1908 and re-released in 1911, was a character study of the preacher J. H. Jowett (1863–1923) who spent several years in pulpit ministry at the Congregational Church in Carrs Lane, Birmingham. He self-published two other works in 1919 and 1927.

He is best known today for writing the book Who Moved the Stone? It was first published in 1930 in England by Faber & Faber and has been repeatedly reprinted (in 1944, 1955, 1958, 1962, 1977, 1981, 1983, 1987, 1996 and 2006) as well as translated into several languages. The book analyses biblical texts about the events related to the crucifixion and resurrection of Jesus of Nazareth. Ross was sceptical regarding the resurrection of Jesus, and set out to analyse the sources and to write a short paper entitled Jesus – the Last Phase to demonstrate the apparent myth. However, in compiling his notes, he came to be convinced of the truth of the resurrection, and set out his reasoning in the book. T. S. Eliot, a literary consultant and an editorial board member at Faber & Faber publishers, read the manuscript when it was submitted for publication. Eliot was enthusiastic about the text and recommended that Faber & Faber publish the book. The book was released in time for Lent in 1930 and Eliot passed complimentary copies for review to authors such as G. K. Chesterton. In Chesterton's review, he remarked that he picked the book up "under the impression that it was a detective story" and found that the case for the resurrection was "treated in such a logical and even legal manner."

Many people have become Christian after reading the book, and writers including John Warwick Montgomery and Josh McDowell, have used his book in their own discussions on the resurrection. Dorothy L. Sayers stated that she relied on Morison's discussion of the trial of Jesus while writing her play The Man Born To Be King. (Sayers had been Ross's colleague while she worked as an advertising copywriter at S. H. Benson in London from 1922 to 1931.)

After the release of Who Moved the Stone, the editor of the London newspaper The Sphere invited Ross to contribute articles to a religious column that were published from 1930 to 1934.

His next book was a science-fiction novel Sunset. The novel featured the radio astronomy experiments of an English physicist John Byford who sent wireless messages into outer space using a photo electric cell gadget. He eventually received a reply from Nerina who was living on a planet three light years from earth. Life on that planet was sterile and dying from cosmic wave radiation. Byford is murdered by criminals who seem to originate from both Germanic and Slavic parts of Europe. A fake message which is attributed to Byford appears in a Russian newspaper and is then syndicated throughout the English-speaking world. The message is based on his contact with Nerina and includes the fruits of eight years research in astronomy and mathematics. The message claims that within two months all life on earth will perish from the same cosmic wave radiation that has ruined Nerina's planet. The novel depicts different reactions to "the Sunset Scare" such as a London advertising agency, major newspapers, and the Stock Exchange reacting to financial panic. There are acts of mob violence as food prices soar. Some wealthy financiers seem to be making lots of money from the panic. In London a large crowd listens to a sermon delivered by the Dean of St. Paul's Cathedral based on the Book of Job and the church service climaxes with an organ rendition of part of Handel's Messiah. The plot includes the investigations of the Archbishop of Canterbury who analyses the message attributed to Byford and concludes that it is a fake. The last portion of the novel includes notes about Byford's experiments and his reflections on the meaning of life that centre on questions about the universe having a purpose, animal cruelty, and passages that he has meditated upon from the Oxyrhynchus Papyri. The Papyri were discovered in Egypt in 1903 and contain statements attributed to Jesus that are not recorded in the Bible.

After spending four years in background research and writing, his book War on Great Cities was published in 1937. He examined the impact of air raids in World War I, and considered the future of aerial bombardment in warfare. For this he interviewed both London eyewitnesses of the World War I bombing raids, but also German officers who carried them out, and his descriptions of these raids account for about three quarters of the book. The book also reflects his background as a member of the Royal Flying Corps and his time spent in Military Intelligence. In the section "Looking to the future", he expressed concern over the possible future use of chemical bombing, but discounted 'bacteria bombs' as a madman's weapon. He also discussed the impact that concentrated incendiary bombing might have on large cities such as London.

He subsequently wrote the book And Pilate said — after pursuing research in Palestine, during which he also traced the water supply in ancient Jerusalem. He spent one month in Palestine and received on the ground assistance from the Swedish-born specialist photographer Gastgifvar Eric Matson. Matson, who was a member of the American Colony in Jerusalem, supplied more than fifty photographic plates that are reproduced in the book. He argued in favour of the historical authenticity of the portrait concerning Pilate's role in the trial of Jesus as presented in the four gospels collected in the New Testament. The end of the book included another discussion about the resurrection as an event.

== Bibliography ==
Books by Frank Morison

- J. H. Jowett, M.A. of Birmingham: A Critical Appreciation (Birmingham: Allday, 1908).
- J. H. Jowett M.A., D.D.: A Character Study (London: James Clarke, 1911) available at Internet Archive
- A Method of Study for Preachers (London: Study Bureau, 1919).
- The Psychology of Public Speaking: introductory manual to the Study Bureau course in public speaking (West Croydon: The Study Bureau, 1927).
- Who Moved the Stone? (London: Faber & Faber; New York: The Century Co., 1930; Grand Rapids: Zondervan, 1958).
- Sunset (London: Faber & Faber, 1932).
- War on Great Cities: A Study of the Facts (London: Faber & Faber, 1937).
- And Pilate Said: — A New Study of the Roman Procurator (London: Rich & Cowan, 1939).

== External sources ==
- Online text of Who Moved The Stone?
- British Newspaper Archive - The Sphere (published four articles 1930–1934 by Frank Morison) - search page
- Find My Past - Search Page British Royal Air Force, Airmen's Service Records 1912-1939 - AIR 79/636/68883 Albert Henry Ross.
- The London Gazette Issue 30747 14 June 1918 p 7072 (A H Ross appointed Second Lieutenant).
- Matson (G. Eric and Edith) Photograph Collection in Library of Congress: Copy of Plan of Palestine Water Conduits (copied for A. H. Ross esq. Nom de Plume Fran Morrison)
- UK National Archives - AIR 76 Air Ministry: Department of the Master General of Personnel - Officer Service Records - AIR 76/436/69 Ross, Albert Henry Date of Birth 01 July 1881.
- Philip Johnson, "Frank Morison and Who Moved the Stone? Advertiser, Novelist, Apologist, Spy," Global Journal of Classical Theology Vol. 14 no. 3 (01/2018)
