= Flower in the Crannied Wall =

Poem by Alfred Tennyson

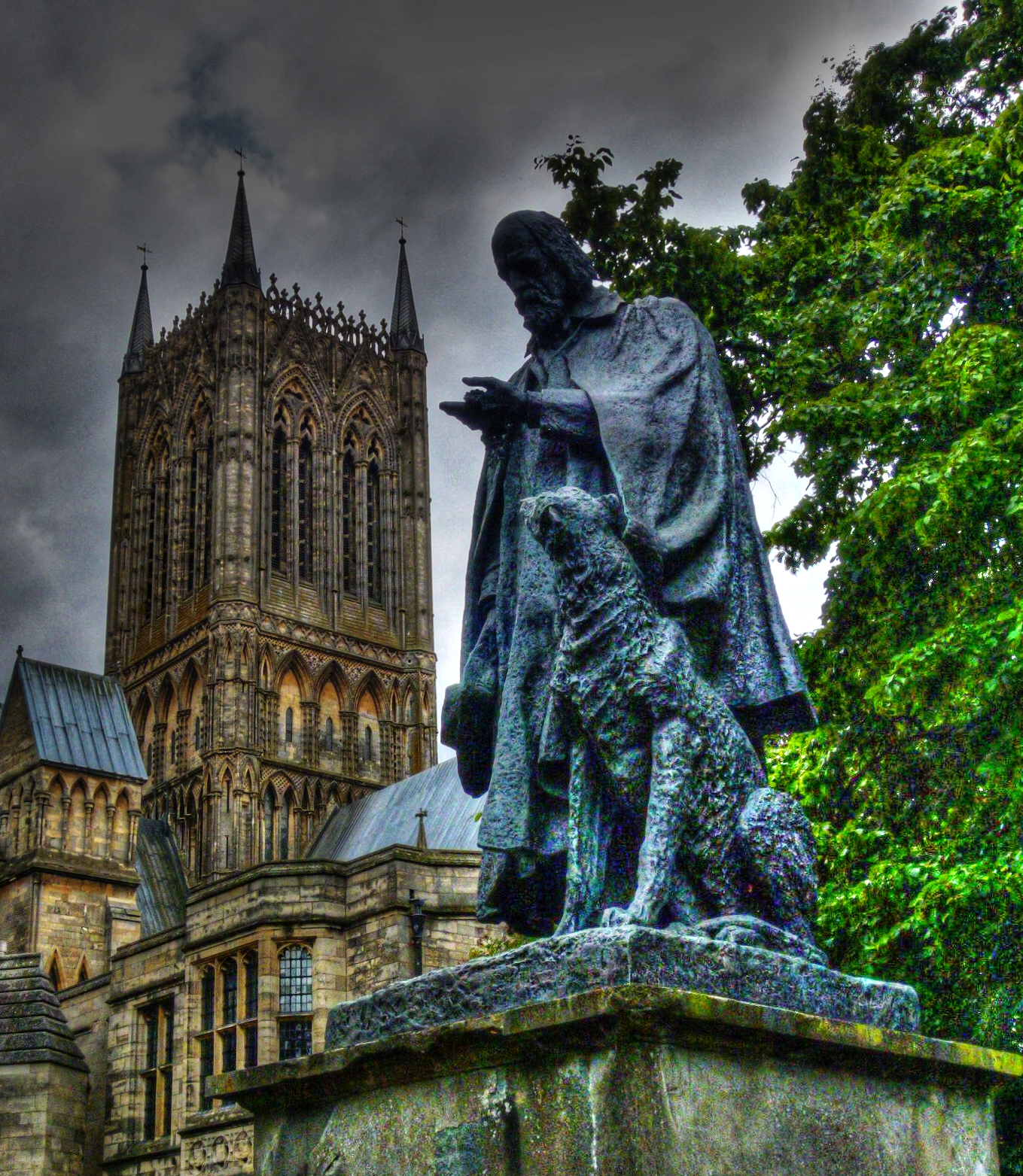
Tennyson memorial statue beside Lincoln Cathedral

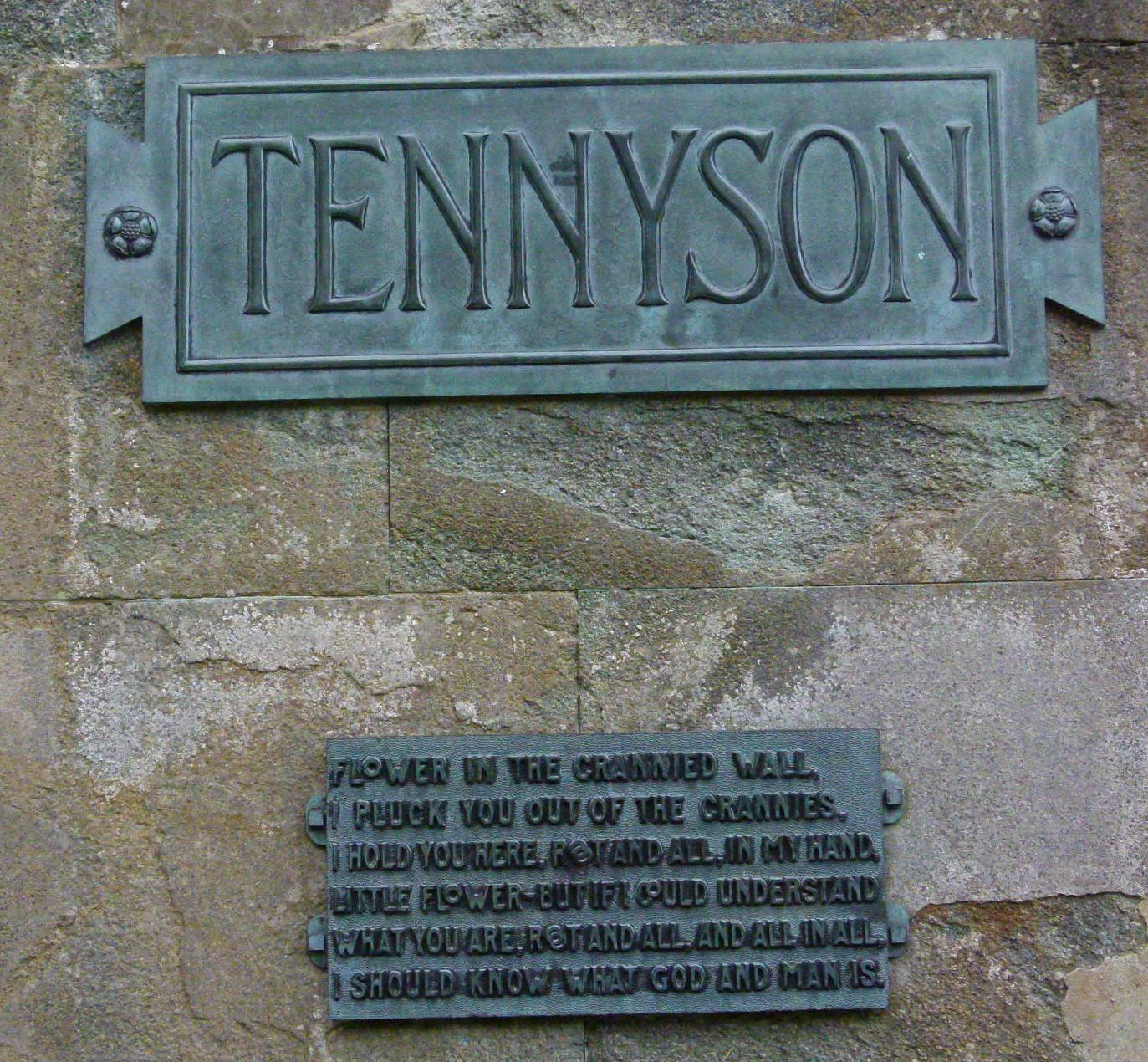
Plaque bearing the text of "Flower in the Crannied Wall" mounted upon the pedestal of the Tennyson memorial statue at Lincoln Cathedral

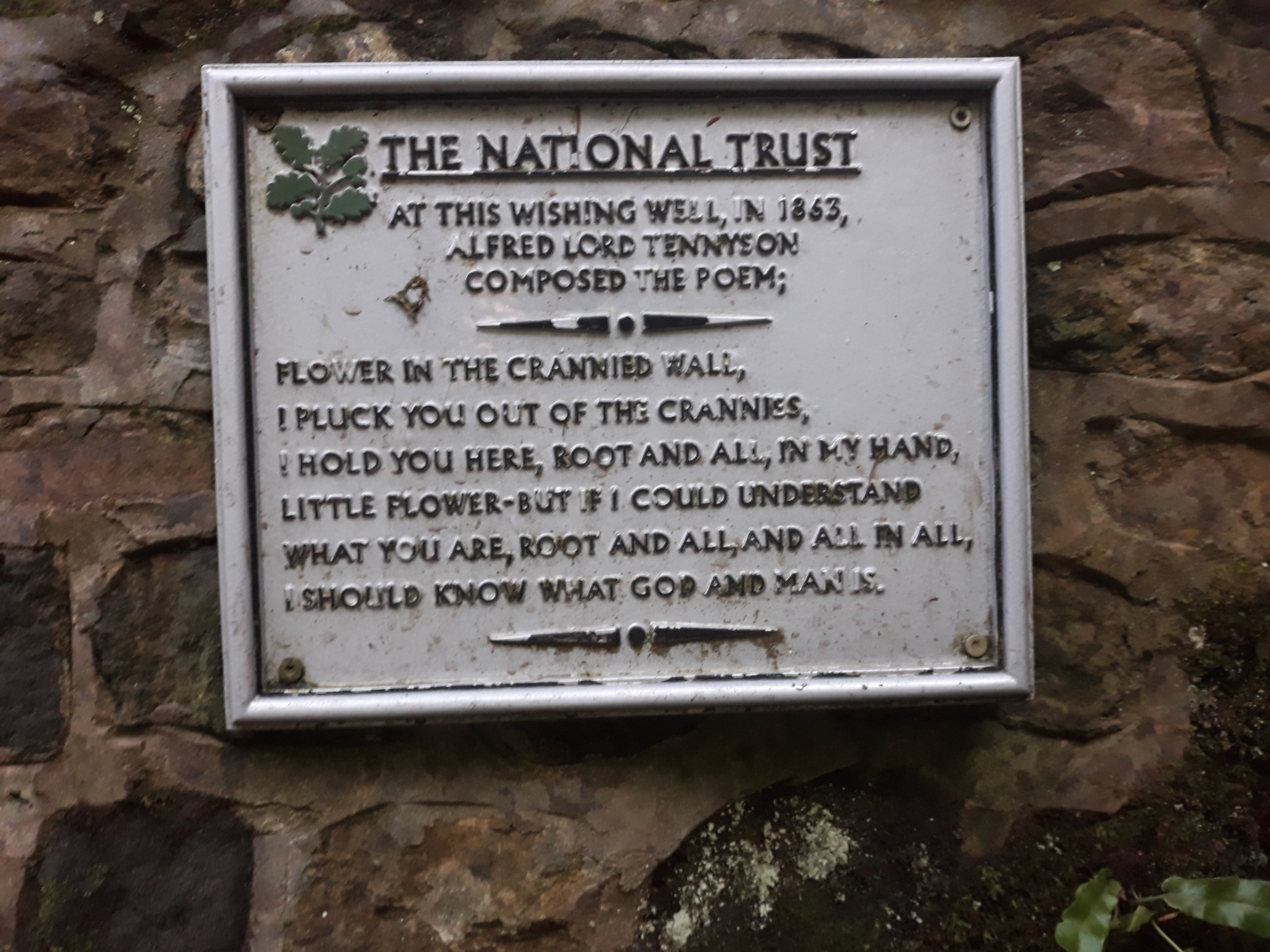
Plaque mounted upon the wishing well at Waggoners Wells, bearing the text of the poem and commemorating its composition at the site

"Flower in the Crannied Wall" is a poem composed by Alfred Tennyson in 1863 beside the wishing well at Waggoners Wells. The poem uses the image of a flowering plant - specifically that of a chasmophyte rooted in the wall of the wishing well - as a source of inspiration for mystical/metaphysical speculation and is one of multiple poems where Tennyson touches upon the topic of the relationships between God, nature, and human life.

The Tennyson memorial statue was completed in 1903 by George Frederic Watts and unveiled in 1905 at Lincoln Cathedral, shows Tennyson holding a flower in his hand standing alongside a dog. Underneath, on the pedestal of the statue, lies a plaque of the poem. Since the statue was unveiled in 1905, there have been concerns over discoloration and disintegration. A commissioned firm specializing in bronze restoration then expressed its view that the statue appears similar to when it was first unveiled.

== Text ==
Flower in the crannied wall,
I pluck you out of the crannies,
I hold you here, root and all, in my hand,
Little flower—but if I could understand
What you are, root and all, and all in all,
I should know what God and man is.

== Structure ==
In terms of stresses, the poem follows an accentual meter where the organization of the poem relied on the "count of stresses, not by count of syllables". The pattern for the number of stresses in this poem is 3-3-4-4-4-3.

Flow-er in the cran-nied wall,

I pluck you out of the cran-nies,

I hold you here, root and all, in my hand,

Little flow-er—but if I could un-der-stand

What you are, root and all, and all in all,

I should know what God and man is.

The poem also follows an ABCCAB rhyme scheme. There are also 2 instances of a feminine ending found in the second and last line.

== Parallel in an earlier work by William Blake ==
A previous exploration of the theme of a mystical epiphany of the divine macrocosm apprehended through the microcosm may be found in the oft-quoted first four lines of the poem "Auguries of Innocence", composed by William Blake (1757 –1827) in the year 1803, but remaining unpublished until 1863 - the very year of Tennyson’s composition of "Flower in the Crannied Wall".

To see the world in a grain of sand
And heaven in a wild flower
Hold infinity in the palm of your hand
And eternity in an hour.

== Reception ==
=== In literature ===
The phrase flower in the crannied wall is sometimes used in a metaphorical sense for the idea of seeking holistic and grander principles from constituent parts and their connections. The poem can be interpreted as Tennyson’s perspective on the connection between God and Nature. English critic Theodore Watts characterized Tennyson as a "nature poet." Fredric Myers described Tennyson as incorporating the “interpenetration of the spiritual and material worlds" into his literary works.

=== In science ===
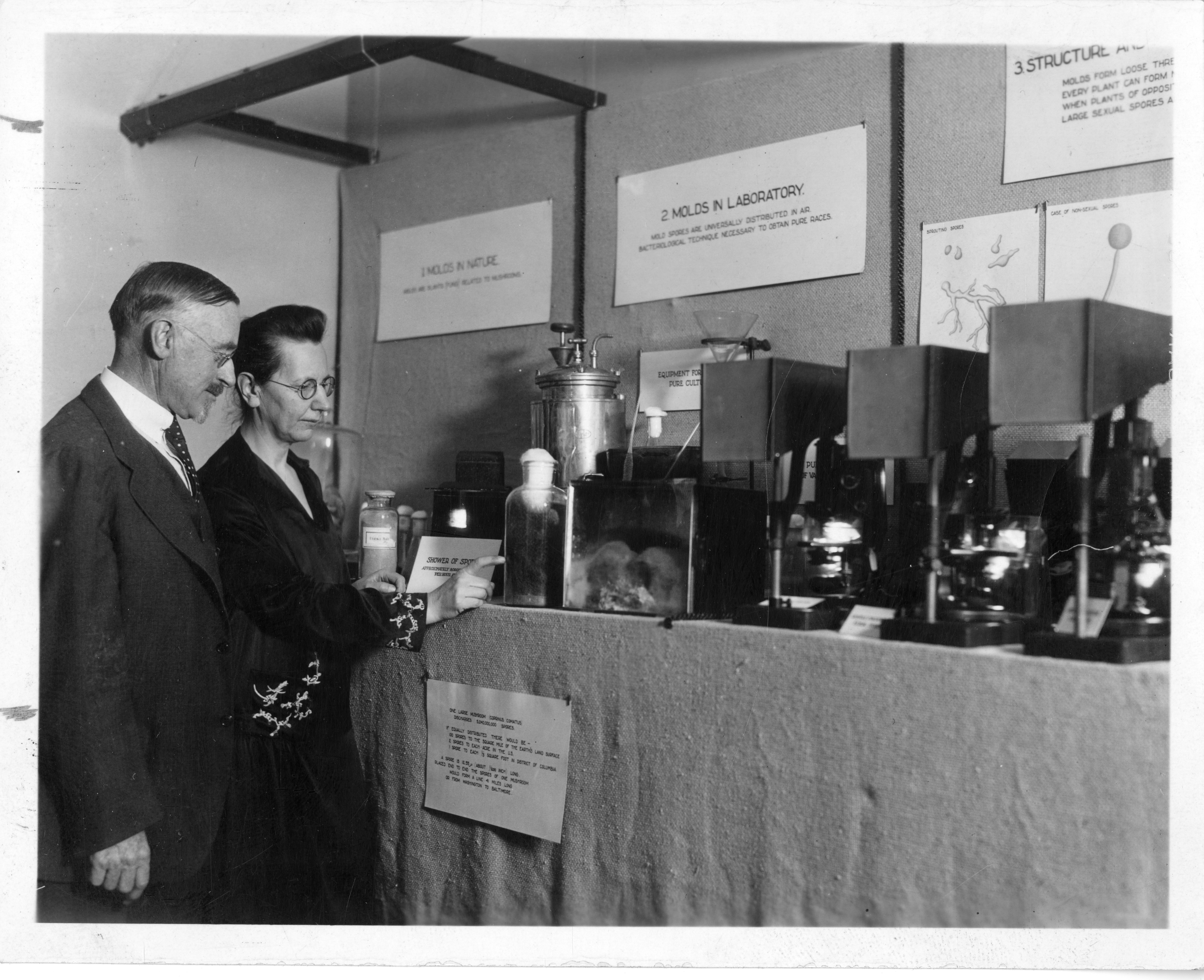
Authorities on the genus Datura, Albert Blakeslee and Sophia Satina. Satina used Flower in the Crannied Wall as the epigraph of her botanical work (written jointly with Amos Avery and Jacob Rietsema) named in honour of her late friend and mentor, Blakeslee

Scientists have also mentioned and drawn their own interpretations of the poem. In his book Through Nature to God, evolutionist John Fiske describes the flower as an “elementary principle” that is both “simple and broad.” According to Fiske, all living things "represents the continuous adjustment of inner to outer relations". The flower mentioned by Tennyson is a plant consisting of complex systems that regulates its "relations within" itself and its "relations existing outside" itself. Further understanding these complex systems scientifically can reveal the "mysteries of Nature." Others including Theodore Soares, the then department head from the University of Chicago, also viewed Tennyson as "one of the earliest of the spiritual interpreters of life" who saw the impacts of science with macroscopic lenses.

Amos Avery, Sophia Satina and Jacob Rietsema use the poem as the epigraph of Blakeslee: the genus Datura, their work of botany and plant genetics devoted to the poisonous and entheogenic jimsonweed genus of the plant family Solanaceae, so named in honour of pioneering plant geneticist Albert Francis Blakeslee.
