= Bramshott Camp =

Coordinates: 51°05′44″N 00°46′17″W

Bramshott Military Camp, often simplified to Camp Bramshott, was a temporary army camp set up on Bramshott Common near the village of Bramshott, Hampshire, England during both the First and Second World Wars.

Camp Bramshott was one of three facilities in the Aldershot Command area established by the Canadian Army. The permanent facility on both occasions was at the British Army's Bordon Camp. Bramshott was one of two temporary camps set-up for additional accommodation in the lead-up to D-Day, along with Witley Camp.

There were five Canadian camps in the immediate vicinity of Camp Bramshott, each one given the name of one of the Great Lakes:

- Huron and Ontario Camps were located on Bramshott Common near the Portsmouth Road
- Superior Camp was located at the Grayshott end of Ludshott Common
- Erie Camp was located at Headley Down, in the area now occupied by Heatherlands estate.
- Connaught Military Hospital was located on Bramshott Common, adjacent to the A3 Trunk road

There is a memorial to the Canadian troops which comprises, according to the Imperial War Museum's dedication page:

Avenue of c. 400 trees, one for each Canadian serviceman who died in WW1 and WW2. These trees are each side of the A3 and there is an underpass to cross the road safely. Each tree is twinned with a grave in Bramshott Churchyard and St Joseph's Catholic Church, Grayshott. There is a memorial near the A3 WMR #40272
