= Sergei Rachmaninoff recordings =

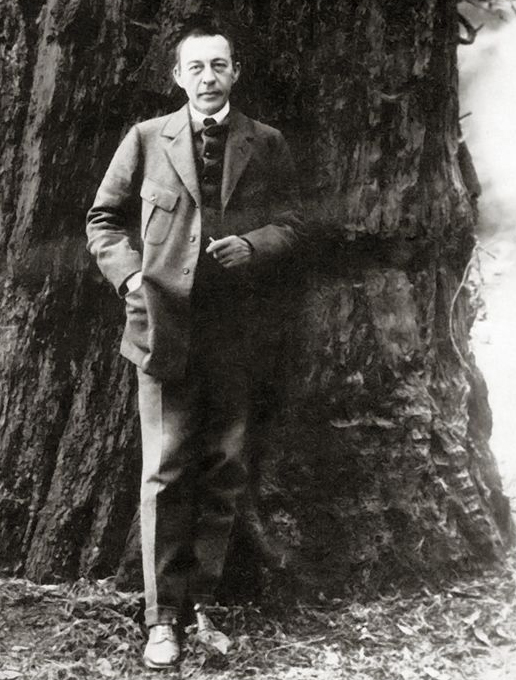
Rachmaninoff in front of a giant Redwood tree, California, 1919

Sergei Rachmaninoff (1873–1943) was a Russian composer, virtuoso pianist, and conductor. Rachmaninoff is widely considered one of the finest pianists of his day and, as a composer, one of the last great representatives of Romanticism in Russian classical music.

== Recordings ==
=== Phonograph ===
Many of Rachmaninoff's recordings are acknowledged classics. Rachmaninoff first recorded in 1919, for Edison Records' unusual "Diamond Discs", as they claimed the best audio fidelity in recording the piano at the time. Thomas Edison, who was musically unsophisticated and quite deaf, did not care for Rachmaninoff's playing and referred to him as a "pounder" at their initial meeting. However, the staff at Edison's New York recording studio (led by company pianist Robert Gayler) asked Edison to reconsider his dismissive position, resulting in a limited contract for ten released sides. The Edison company took some care with its piano recordings but used an unusual make, the Lauter, made in Newark; Rachmaninoff recorded on a Lauter concert grand, one of the few the company made.

Rachmaninoff believed his own performances to be variable in quality and requested that he be allowed to approve any recordings for commercial release. Edison agreed but still issued multiple takes, a very unusual practice which was routine at Edison, where strict company policy demanded three good takes of each selection to mitigate the effects of production wear and provide redundancy in case of damage to a metal master; in practice, this meant to the staff that takes passed for issue were interchangeable, but it was also very wearing on artists who often had to record an item several times over to produce each of those three problem-free takes. Edison's staff and Rachmaninoff were pleased with the released discs and wanted to record more, but Thomas Edison refused to engage the pianist for further work, saying the ten sides were sufficient for label prestige purposes.

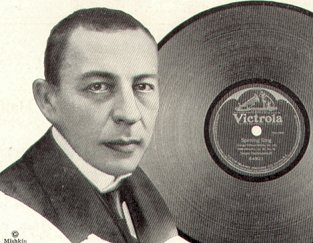
Rachmaninoff (1921 Victor advertisement)

Rachmaninoff signed a contract with the Victor Talking Machine Company (later RCA Victor) in 1920. The company was pleased to comply with Rachmaninoff's restrictions, and proudly advertised him as one of their prominent recording artists. His recordings for Victor continued until 1942, when the American Federation of Musicians imposed a recording ban on their members.

Particularly renowned are his renditions of Schumann's Carnaval and Chopin's Funeral March Sonata, along with many shorter pieces. He recorded all four of his piano concertos with the Philadelphia Orchestra, including two versions of the second concerto with Leopold Stokowski conducting (an acoustical recording in 1924 and an electrical remake in 1929), and the world premiere recording of the Rhapsody on a Theme of Paganini, soon after the first performance (1934) with the Philadelphians under Stokowski. The first, third, and fourth concertos were recorded with Eugene Ormandy in 1939-41. Rachmaninoff also made three recordings conducting the Philadelphia Orchestra in his own Third Symphony, his symphonic poem Isle of the Dead, and his orchestration of Vocalise. All of these recordings were reissued in a 10-CD set "Sergei Rachmaninoff The Complete Recordings" in RCA Victor Gold Seal 09026-61265-2, along with subsequent reissues.

This listing below includes only recordings in which Rachmaninoff himself was a participant, as either pianist or conductor. Recordings of Rachmaninoff’s music made by other performers are not included.

Composer	Title of Work, other performers	Recording date(s)	Record label
Johann Sebastian Bach	Sarabande, from Klavier Partita No. 4 in D major, BWV 828	December 16, 1925	RCA
Johann Sebastian Bach	Prelude, Gavotte, and Gigue, from Violin Partita No. 3 in E major, BWV 1006	February 26 & 27, 1942	RCA
Ludwig van Beethoven	Violin Sonata No. 8 in G major, Op. 30, No. 3: Fritz Kreisler, violin	March 22, 1928	RCA
Ludwig van Beethoven	32 Variations in C minor, WoO. 80	April 13 & May 14, 1925	RCA
Ludwig van Beethoven	Turkish March, from The Ruins of Athens, Op. 113	December 14, 1925	RCA
Georges Bizet	Minuet, from L'arlésienne Suite, No. 1	February 24, 1922	RCA
Alexander Borodin	Scherzo in A♭ major	December 23, 1935	RCA
Frédéric Chopin	Ballade in A♭ major, Op. 47	April 13, 1925	RCA
Frédéric Chopin	Mazurka in C♯ minor, Op. 63, No. 3	December 27, 1923	RCA
Frédéric Chopin	Mazurka in A minor, Op. 68, No. 2	December 23, 1935	RCA
Frédéric Chopin	Nocturne in E♭ major, Op. 9, No. 2	April 5, 1927	RCA
Frédéric Chopin	Nocturne in F♯ major, Op. 15, No. 2	December 27, 1923	RCA
Frédéric Chopin	"Return Home", and "The Maiden's Wish", from Polish Songs	February 27, 1942	RCA
Frédéric Chopin	Scherzo in C♯ minor, Op. 39	March 28, 1924	RCA
Frédéric Chopin	Sonata in B♭ minor, Op. 35	February 18, 1930	RCA
Frédéric Chopin	Waltz in E♭ major, Op. 18 "Grand Valse Brillante"	January 21, 1921	RCA
Frédéric Chopin	Waltz in F major, Op. 34, No. 3 "Valse Brillante"	November 4, 1920	RCA
Frédéric Chopin	Waltz in A♭ major, Op. 42	April 18, 1919	Edison
Frédéric Chopin	Waltz in D♭ major, Op. 64, No. 1 "Minute"	April 2, 1921	RCA
Frédéric Chopin	Waltz in D♭ major, Op. 64, No. 1 "Minute"	April 5, 1923	RCA
Frédéric Chopin	Waltz in C♯ minor, Op. 64, No. 2	April 5, 1927	RCA
Frédéric Chopin	Waltz in A♭ major, Op. 64, No. 3	April 19, 1919	Edison
Frédéric Chopin	Waltz in A♭ major, Op. 64, No. 3	April 5, 1927	RCA
Frédéric Chopin	Waltz in B minor, Op. 69, No. 2	October 24, 1923	RCA
Frédéric Chopin	Waltz in G♭ major, Op. 70, No. 1	April 2, 1921	RCA
Frédéric Chopin	Waltz in E minor, Op. posth	February 18, 1930	RCA
Louis-Claude Daquin	"Le coucou"	October 21, 1920	RCA
Claude Debussy	"Dr. Gradus ad Parnassum", and "Golliwog's Cakewalk", from Children's Corner	January 21, 1921	RCA
Ernst von Dohnányi	Etude in F major, Op. 28, No. 2	October 25, 1921	RCA
Christoph Willibald Gluck	Melodie, from Orfeo ed Euridice	May 14, 1925	RCA
Edvard Grieg	Waltz, and Elfin Dance, from Lyric Pieces, Op. 12	October 12, 1921	RCA
Edvard Grieg	Violin Sonata in C minor, Op. 45: Fritz Kreisler, violin	September 14 & 15, 1928	RCA
George Frideric Handel	Air & Variations ("The Harmonious Blacksmith")	January 3, 1936	RCA
Adolf Henselt	"Si oiseau j'étais" (Etude in F♯ major, Op. 2, No. 6)	December 27, 1923	RCA
Fritz Kreisler	"Liebesfreud" (arr. Rachmaninoff)	December 29, 1925	RCA
Fritz Kreisler	"Liebesfreud" (arr. Rachmaninoff)	February 26, 1942	RCA
Fritz Kreisler	"Liebeslied" (arr. Rachmaninoff)	October 25, 1921	RCA
Franz Liszt	"Gnomenreigen" (Concert Etude No. 2)	December 16, 1925	RCA
Franz Liszt	Hungarian Rhapsody No. 2 (cadenza: Rachmaninoff)	April 22, 1919	Edison
Franz Liszt	Polonaise No. 2 in E major	April 13, 1925	RCA
Felix Mendelssohn	Etude in F major, Op. 104b, No. 2	April 5, 1927	RCA
Felix Mendelssohn	Etude in A minor, Op. 104b, No. 3	April 5, 1927	RCA
Felix Mendelssohn	"Spinning Song", from Songs Without Words, Op. 67	November 4, 1920	RCA
Felix Mendelssohn	"Spinning Song", from Songs Without Words, Op. 67	April 25, 1928	RCA
Felix Mendelssohn	Scherzo, from A Midsummer Night's Dream (arr. Rachmaninoff)	December 23, 1935	RCA
Moritz Moszkowski	"La jongleuse", Op. 52, No. 4	March 6, 1923	RCA
Wolfgang Amadeus Mozart	Theme and Variations, from Sonata in A major, K. 331	April 18, 1919	Edison
Wolfgang Amadeus Mozart	Rondo alla turca, from Sonata in A major, K. 331	May 14, 1925	RCA
Modest Mussorgsky	Hopak, from The Fair at Sorochyntsi (arr. Rachmaninoff)	April 13, 1925	RCA
Ignacy Jan Paderewski	Minuet in G major, Op. 14, No. 1	April 5, 1927	RCA
Sergei Rachmaninoff	Barcarolle in G minor, Op. 10, No. 3	April 23, 1919	Edison
Sergei Rachmaninoff	Piano Concerto No. 1 in F♯ minor, Op. 1: Philadelphia Orchestra; Eugene Ormandy, conductor	December 4, 1939 & February 24, 1940	RCA
Sergei Rachmaninoff	Piano Concerto No. 2 in C minor, Op. 18: Philadelphia Orchestra; Leopold Stokowski, conductor	January 3 & December 22, 1924	RCA
Sergei Rachmaninoff	Piano Concerto No. 2 in C minor, Op. 18: Philadelphia Orchestra; Leopold Stokowski, conductor	April 10 & 13, 1929	RCA
Sergei Rachmaninoff	Piano Concerto No. 3 in D minor, Op. 30: Philadelphia Orchestra; Eugene Ormandy, conductor	December 4, 1939 & February 24, 1940	RCA
Sergei Rachmaninoff	Piano Concerto No. 4 in G minor, Op. 40: Philadelphia Orchestra; Eugene Ormandy, conductor	December 20, 1941	RCA
Sergei Rachmaninoff	Etude-tableau in C major, Op. 33, No. 2	March 18, 1940	RCA
Sergei Rachmaninoff	Etude-tableau in E♭ major, Op. 33, No. 7	March 18, 1940	RCA
Sergei Rachmaninoff	Etude-tableau in A minor, Op. 39, No. 6	December 16, 1925	RCA
Sergei Rachmaninoff	Humoresque in G major, Op. 10, No. 5 (revised version)	April 9, 1940	RCA
Sergei Rachmaninoff	Isle of the Dead, Op. 29: The Philadelphia Orchestra	April 2, 1929	RCA
Sergei Rachmaninoff	Melodie in E major, Op. 3, No. 3 (revised version)	April 9, 1940	RCA
Sergei Rachmaninoff	Moment Musical in E♭ minor, Op. 16, No. 2	March 18, 1940	RCA
Sergei Rachmaninoff	"Oriental Sketch"	March 18, 1940	RCA
Sergei Rachmaninoff	Polichinelle in F♯ minor, Op. 3, No. 4	March 6, 1923	RCA
Sergei Rachmaninoff	"Polka de W.R."	April 23, 1919	Edison
Sergei Rachmaninoff	"Polka de W.R."	October 12, 1921	RCA
Sergei Rachmaninoff	"Polka de W.R."	April 4, 1928	RCA
Sergei Rachmaninoff	"Polka italienne": Natalie Rachmaninoff, second piano	1938	Private recording
Sergei Rachmaninoff	Prelude in C♯ minor, Op. 3, No. 2	April 23, 1919	Edison
Sergei Rachmaninoff	Prelude in C♯ minor, Op. 3, No. 2	October 14, 1921	RCA
Sergei Rachmaninoff	Prelude in C♯ minor, Op. 3, No. 2	April 4, 1928	RCA
Sergei Rachmaninoff	Prelude in G minor, Op. 23, No. 5	May 17, 1920	RCA
Sergei Rachmaninoff	Prelude in G♭ major, Op. 23, No. 10	March 18, 1940	RCA
Sergei Rachmaninoff	Prelude in E major, Op. 32, No. 3	March 18, 1940	RCA
Sergei Rachmaninoff	Prelude in G major, Op. 32, No. 5	May 3, 1920	RCA
Sergei Rachmaninoff	Prelude in F minor, Op. 32, No. 6	March 18, 1940	RCA
Sergei Rachmaninoff	Prelude in F major, Op. 32, No. 7	March 18, 1940	RCA
Sergei Rachmaninoff	Prelude in G♯ minor, Op. 32, No. 12	January 21, 1921	RCA
Sergei Rachmaninoff	Rhapsody on a Theme of Paganini, Op. 43: Philadelphia Orchestra; Leopold Stokowski, conductor	December 24, 1934	RCA
Sergei Rachmaninoff	Serenade in B♭, Op. 3, No. 5 (1892 version)	November 4, 1922	RCA
Sergei Rachmaninoff	Serenade in B♭, Op. 3, No. 5 (1892 version)	January 3, 1936	RCA
Sergei Rachmaninoff	"Daisies", Op. 38, No. 3	March 18, 1940	RCA
Sergei Rachmaninoff	"Lilacs", Op. 21, No. 5	December 27, 1923	RCA
Sergei Rachmaninoff	"Lilacs", Op. 21, No. 5	February 26, 1942	RCA
Sergei Rachmaninoff	"Vocalise", Op. 34, No. 14: Philadelphia Orchestra	April 20, 1929	RCA
Sergei Rachmaninoff	Symphony No. 3 in A minor, Op. 44: Philadelphia Orchestra	December 11, 1939	RCA
Nikolai Rimsky-Korsakov	"Flight of the Bumblebee", from Tsar Sultan (arr. Rachmaninoff)	April 16, 1929	RCA
Camille Saint-Saëns	"The Swan", from The Carnival of the Animals (arr. Siloti)	December 30, 1924	RCA
Domenico Scarlatti	Pastorale (after Sonata in D minor, L. 413) (arr. Karl Tausig)	April 19, 1919	Edison
Franz Schubert	Impromptu in A♭ major, D. 899, No. 4	December 29, 1925	RCA
Franz Schubert	Violin Sonata in A major, D. 574: Fritz Kreisler, violin	December 20 & 21, 1928	RCA
Franz Schubert	Serenade, from Schwanengesang, D. 957 (arr. Franz Liszt)	February 27, 1942	RCA
Franz Schubert	Das Wandern, from Die schöne Müllerin, D, 795 (arr. Liszt)	April 14, 1925	RCA
Franz Schubert	Wohin?, from Die schöne Müllerin, D, 795 (arr. Rachmaninoff)	December 29, 1925	RCA
Robert Schumann	Carnaval, Op. 9	April 9, 10, & 12, 1929	RCA
Robert Schumann	"Der Kontrabandiste", from Spanisches Liederspiel, Op. 74 (arr. Tausig)	February 27, 1942	RCA
Alexander Scriabin	Prelude in F♯ minor, Op. 11, No. 8	April 16, 1929	RCA
Johann Strauss II	One Lives But Once (arr. Tausig)	April 5, 1927	RCA
Pyotr Ilyich Tchaikovsky	Humoresque in G major, Op. 10, No. 2	December 27, 1923	RCA
Pyotr Ilyich Tchaikovsky	Troika (November), from The Seasons, Op. 37b	May 3, 1920	RCA
Pyotr Ilyich Tchaikovsky	Troika (November), from The Seasons, Op. 37b	April 11, 1928	RCA
Pyotr Ilyich Tchaikovsky	Waltz in A♭ major, Op. 40, No. 8	April 5, 1923	RCA
Pyotr Ilyich Tchaikovsky	Lullaby, Op. 16, No. 1	February 26, 1942	RCA
Traditional	Powder and Paint: Nadezhda Plevitskaya, vocalist	February 22, 1926	RCA
Rachmaninoff	Symphonic Dances	21 December 1940	Private (Marston Records)

=== Piano rolls ===
Rachmaninoff also performed several works on piano rolls. Several manufacturers, in particular the Aeolian Company, published his compositions on perforated music rolls from about 1900 onwards. His sister-in-law, Sofia Satina, remembered him at the family estate at Ivanovka, pedalling gleefully through a set of rolls of his Second Piano Concerto, apparently acquired from a German source, most probably the Aeolian Company's Berlin subsidiary, the Choralion Company. Aeolian in London created a set of three rolls of this concerto in 1909, which remained in the catalogues of its various successors until the late 1970s.

From 1919, he made 35 piano rolls (12 of which were his own compositions), for the American Piano Company (Ampico)'s reproducing piano. According to the Ampico publicity department, he initially disbelieved that a roll of punched paper could provide an accurate record, so he was invited to listen to a proof copy of his first recording. After the performance, he was quoted as saying "Gentlemen—I, Sergei Rachmaninoff, have just heard myself play!" For demonstration purposes, he recorded the solo part of his Second Piano Concerto for Ampico, though only the second movement was used publicly and has survived. He continued to make roll recordings until around 1929, though his last roll, the Chopin Scherzo in B♭ minor, was not published until October 1933.

Composer	Title of Work	Recording date(s)	Roll company
Tchaikovsky	Troika (November), from The Seasons, Op. 37b	March 17, 1919	Ampico
John Stafford Smith	The Star Spangled Banner (arr. Rachmaninoff)	March 17, 1919	Ampico
Rachmaninoff	Polichinelle, Op. 3, No. 4	March 17, 1919	Ampico
Rachmaninoff	Prelude in C♯ minor, Op. 3, No. 2	March 17, 1919	Ampico
Rachmaninoff	Melodie in E major, Op. 3, No. 3 (original version)	March 17, 1919	Ampico
Rachmaninoff	Humoresque in G major, Op. 10, No. 5 (original version)	March 17, 1919	Ampico
Rachmaninoff	Barcarolle in G minor, Op. 10, No. 3	March 17, 1919	Ampico
Rachmaninoff	Prelude in G minor, Op. 23, No. 5	March 17, 1919	Ampico
Rachmaninoff	Polka de W.R.	March 17, 1919	Ampico
Mendelssohn	Spinning Song, Op. 67, No. 4	March 5, 1921	Ampico
Chopin	Waltz in E♭ major, Op. 18	March 5, 1921	Ampico
Rachmaninoff	Etude-Tableau in A minor, Op. 39, No. 6	March 5, 1921	Ampico
Mussorgsky	Hopak, from Sorochintsky Fair (arr. Rachmaninoff)	March 5, 1921	Ampico
Kreisler	Liebesleid (arr. Rachmaninoff)	April 6, 1922	Ampico
Bizet	Minuet, from L’Arlesienne Suite (arr. Rachmaninoff)	April 6, 1922	Ampico
Tchaikovsky	Waltz, Op. 40, No. 8	April 13, 1923	Ampico
Chopin	Waltz in F major, Op. 34, No. 3	April 13, 1923	Ampico
Rachmaninoff	Lilacs, Op. 21, No. 6	April 13, 1923	Ampico
Rachmaninoff	Serenade, Op. 3, No. 5 (1892 version)	April 13, 1923	Ampico
Henselt	Etude in F♯ major, Op. 2, No. 6	November 13, 1923	Ampico
Chopin	The Maiden’s Wish (arr. Liszt)	November 13, 1923	Ampico
Gluck	Melodie, from Orfeo and Euridice (arr. Sgambati)	January 14, 1925	Ampico
Schubert	Das Wandern (arr. Liszt)	January 14, 1925	Ampico
J. S. Bach	Sarabande, from Partita No. 4, BWV 828	December 22, 1925	Ampico
Schubert	Wohin? (arr. Rachmaninoff)	December 22, 1925	Ampico
Kreisler	Liebesfreud (arr. Rachmaninoff)	December 22, 1925	Ampico
Chopin	Nocturne in F major, Op. 15, No. 1	February 1, 1927	Ampico
Paderewski	Minuet in G major, Op. 14	February 1, 1927	Ampico
Beethoven	Turkish March, from The Ruins of Athens (arr. Anton Rubinstein)	February 1, 1927	Ampico
Schubert	Impromptu in A♭ major, D. 899, No. 4	March 27, 1928	Ampico
Rachmaninoff	Etude-Tableau in B minor, Op. 39, No, 4	March 27, 1928	Ampico
Rachmaninoff	Elegie in E♭ minor, Op. 3, No. 1	April 4, 1928	Ampico
Anton Rubinstein	Barcarolle, Op. 93, No. 7	February 1, 1929	Ampico
Chopin	Scherzo in B♭ minor, Op. 31	February 1, 1929	Ampico
Rimsky-Korsakov	Flight of the Bumble Bee, from The Tsar Sultan (arr. Rachmaninoff)	February 1, 1929	Ampico
