= Ivanovka estate =

Historic house museum in Russia

Coordinates: 51°57′13.70″N 42°0′7.26″E

Museum Estate of S. V. Rachmaninov
- Музей-усадьба С.В. Рахманинова «Ивановка»
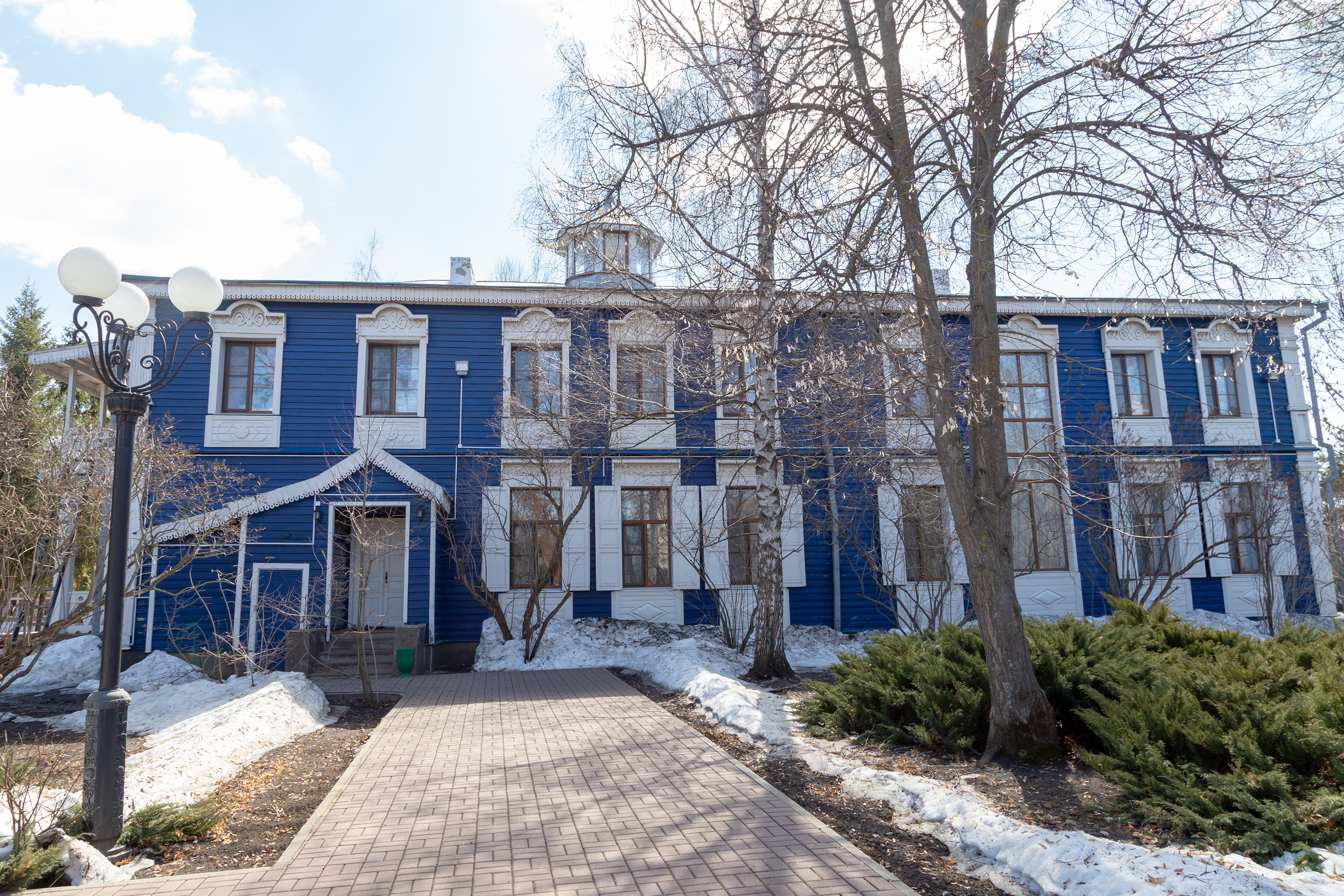
- The estate photographed in 2018.

- Location within Tambov Oblast
- Former name: House-Museum of S. V. Rachmaninov
- Location: Ivanovka, Uvarovsky District, Tambov Region, Russia
- Type: Museum and cultural centre
- Website: http://ivanovka-museum.ru/

Ivanovka (Russian: Ивановка) is a village and country estate located in Uvarovsky District, Tambov region, Russia. It was the summer residence of the Russian composer Sergei Rachmaninoff in the period between 1890 and 1917 (until his emigration). It was the family home of his aristocratic relatives, the Satins. Many of Rachmaninoff's earlier masterpieces were created in its bucolic atmosphere. A museum commemorating the life and works of the composer was opened there in 1982.

== Contemporary descriptions ==
S. A. Satina, a cousin of Rachmaninoff's, wrote in her memoirs of the estate:

The small village of Ivanovka adjoined our estate. Endless fields stretched around us, merging on the horizon with the sky. In the distance, in the west, the belfry of our parish church, located five miles from Ivanovka, was visible. In the north is someone's windmill, to the east is nothing but fields, and to the south is our aspen forest. For many miles around Ivanovka, these aspen trees and our garden near the house were the only trees among the fields, and therefore this aspen tree was a refuge for hares, foxes, and even wolves sometimes running from somewhere, especially for birds that nested their nests there. and filling the air with twittering and singing.

—Memoirs of S.A. Satina, museum-ivanovka.ru

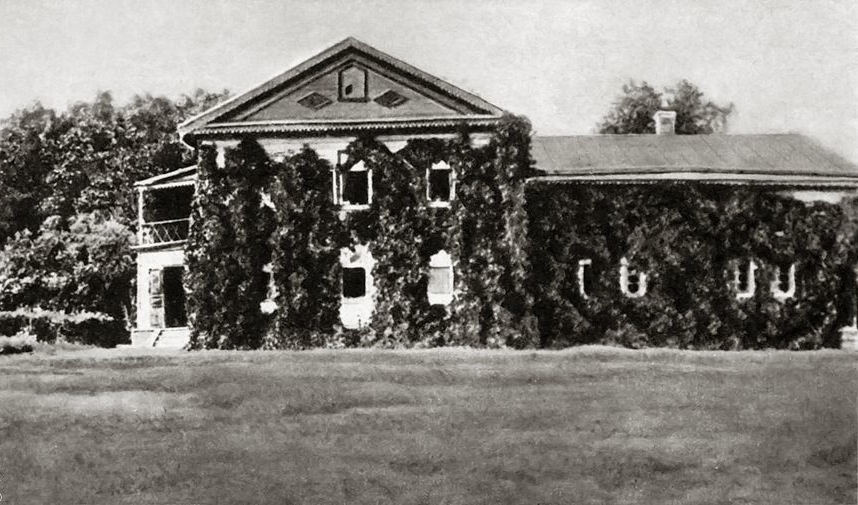
This tranquil countryside setting was the ideal location for Rachmaninoff to compose his works

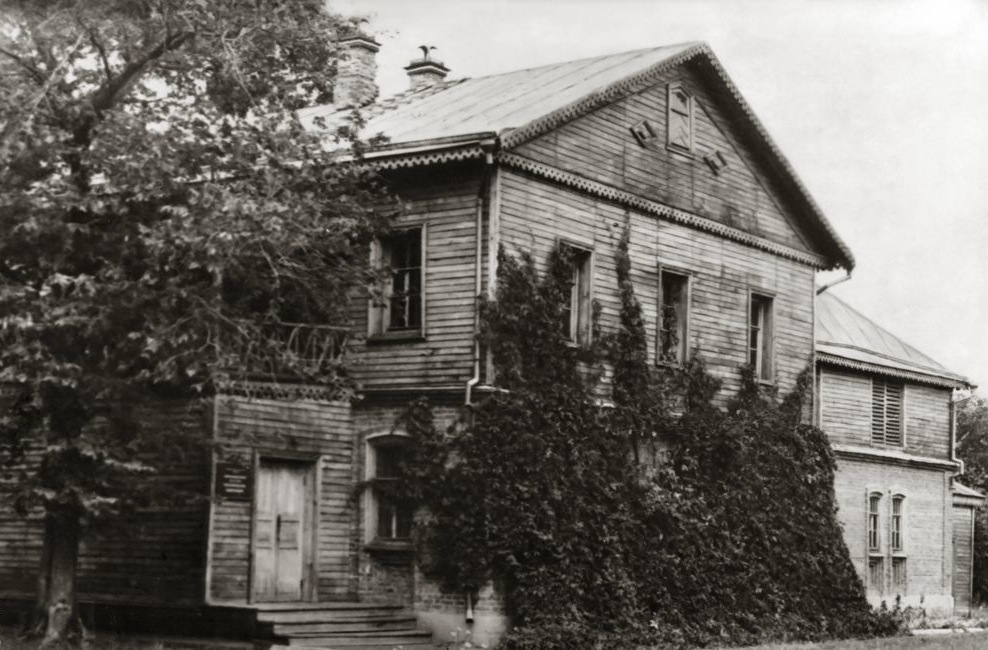
Ivanovka, likely photographed in the early 20th century.

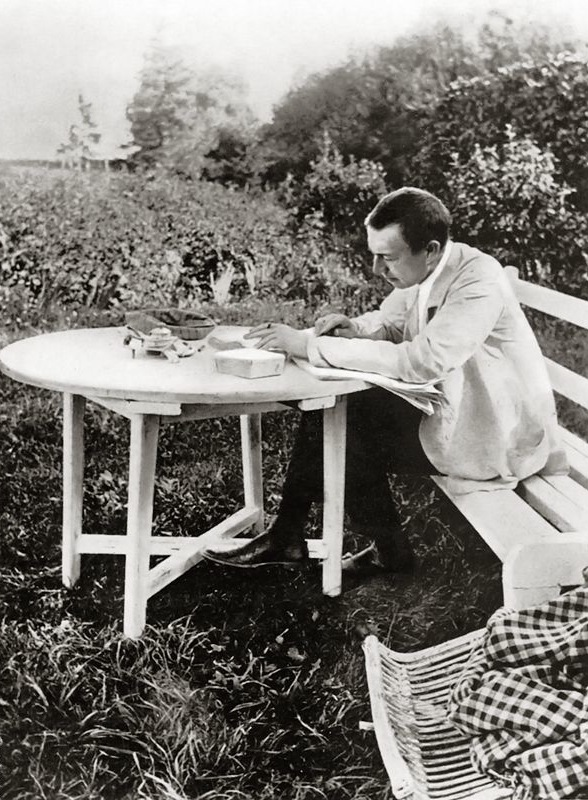
Sergei Rachmaninoff at Ivanovka, proofing his third piano concerto.

== Memorial ==
All of the buildings in the town of Ivanovka were destroyed during the October Revolution and Russian Civil War. The village was reconstructed when the Bureau of the Tambov Regional Committee decided to create an institution in the memory of Rachmaninoff. Local author D.V. Kalashnikov wrote a booklet titled "Rachmaninov sites in the Tambov Region" and campaigned for the creation of a site in his legacy.

The museum of S.V. Rachmaninov was opened in August 1978 as a branch of the Tambov Regional Museum. On 18 June 1982, the Rachmaninoff House Museum was opened alongside a sculptural portrait by K. Ya. Malofeev and A.S. Kulikov.

A number of elements of the estate have been slowly built, with a garage established in 1993, a pantry in 1994, and a manor house in 1995.

Today, the village hosts many scientific conferences, music festivals, contests, concerts, music and theater assemblies. Festivals held have included the Lilac Festival (1985–present), the Musical Summer in Ivanovka (1986–present), Jazz in Ivanovka (1989–present), Starry Summer in Ivanovka (1990–present), and Lilac Night in Ivanovka (1990–present).

The first of a yearly series of scientific conferences was held in 1993, titled "S.V. Rachmaninov and world musical culture".

== See also ==
- List of music museums
