= Bramshott Common =

Heathland in Hampshire, England

Coordinates: 51°05′44″N 0°46′17″W

Bramshott Common is part of a large expanse of heathland, near Bramshott, Hampshire, England, bordering Ludshott Common.

It was the site of Bramshott Camps, set up at Bramshott Chase to accommodate Canadian troops during the two world wars. It is bisected by the A3 trunk road.
