= Cain Manor =

General information
- Type: Hall House
- Architectural style: Elizabethan
- Location: Headley (parish), East Hampshire, England
- Opened: 16th century
- Owner: Bijou Wedding Venues

Cain Manor is an Elizabethan building built in the late 16th century on what was then known as Headley Common (now Headley Down), in the parish of Headley, Hampshire, England. It sits on broad slopes at the foot of the South Downs National Park centred about 2 miles (3.2 km) away from the village of Churt in Surrey. Its name Manor should be described as manor house, if its implied manor house status can be proven.

== History and architecture ==
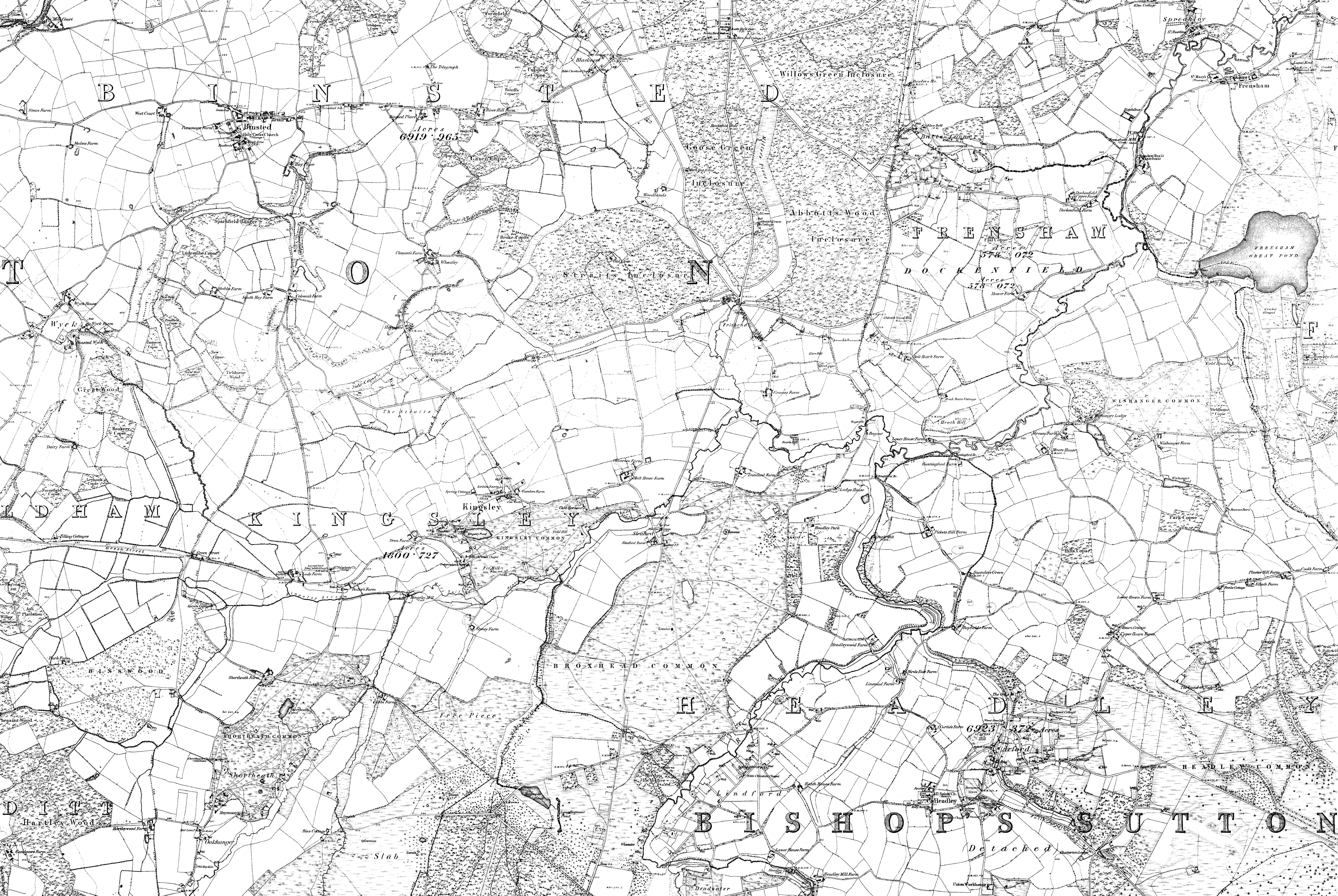
Extract from Map of Hampshire Sheet 036, Ordnance Survey 1st series (scale 1:10560), 1866-1889 shows not a later building on maps as "Cain Farm" but does show the site of the nearby remaining building "Land of Nod".

The building was owned by Cane or Cain, possibly among the bulk of Elizabethan communicants excommunicated Catholic Church on the accession of the queen. He originally named the house 'The Land of Nod' in reference to the biblical story of Cain's banishment. Cain Manor is fitted with cathedral windows and was built with wood believed to be recycled from ship timbers dating before the Elizabethan era. The building, pre-dating 1840, is among a very small number not to have been listed — the reason is not known — most Elizabethan buildings are in the highest possible of the three gradings of listing, grade I (for heritage and/or architecture).

The cornerstone collaborative historians' works, the Victoria County History series, lists two manors and seven hamlets in the parish of Headley and the main residences of the late Victorian age but does not mention this residence nor list this as a manor. However the name may derive from the earliest recorded manorial owner after the 1086 Domesday survey, "In the latter part of the thirteenth century [nearby Broxhead] manor was held of Baldwin de Calne".

== Use ==
The building is owned by Bijou Wedding Venues and is used to host weddings and other events.
