= Journal of Race Development =

American academic journal

The Journal of Race Development was the first American academic journal of international relations. It was founded in 1910 by G. Stanley Hall along with George Hubbard Blakeslee, both of Clark University. Despite a name which now suggests a journal devoted to eugenics, the journal, in fact, dealt with a variety of topics connected with politics, foreign affairs and international relations. It was renamed the Journal of International Relations, which in turn was merged with Foreign Affairs in 1922.
