= Kathleen Margaret Cole =

Canadian phycologist (1924–2003)

Kathleen "Kay" Margaret Cole (1924, Vancouver – 12 April 2003, Vancouver) was a Canadian phycologist, known as one of the world's leading experts in the cytology of marine algae. In 1998 the Canadian Botanical Society awarded her the George Lawson Medal for lifetime achievement.

== Biography ==
After her early childhood years in Wells, British Columbia, Kathleen Margaret Cole moved with her family to West Vancouver. She graduated in biology with a B.A. in 1947 and an M.A. in 1948 from the University of British Columbia (UBC). Her M.A. thesis is entitled A study of a possible new mutation, synpalpi, occurring in Drosophila melanogaster. She matriculated as a graduate student in genetics at Smith College. There she completed her Ph.D. in plant genetics under the supervision of Albert F. Blakeslee in 1952. Her Ph.D. dissertation investigated the genetics of the invasive weed Datura stramonium.

Kathleen M. Cole spent her career at UBC. She joined the department of biology and botany in 1952 as a lecturer and was eventually promoted to full professor. During the late 1950s, she spent one summer at the University of Washington's Friday Harbor Laboratories. There she used cytological techniques to experiment on marine algae. This research established the focus of the remainder of her career and her work with her graduate students and other collaborators.

From 1972 to 1977, Cole was an editor for the journal Phycologia. She was the co-editor with Robert G. Sheath of the 1990 book Biology of the Red Algae. The book is an authoritative reference and survey of research from 1973 to 1989 on the phylum Rhodophyta and was reissued in 2011.

Cole was an established contralto singer. During her years as a UBC student, she performed in many concerts, and on radio broadcasts in Vancouver. As a UBC faculty member, she was active in the university's Music Society.

== Selected publications ==
- Sheath, Robert G.; Cole, Kathleen M. (1980). "Distribution and Salinity Adaptations of Bangia Atropurpurea (Rhodophyta), A Putative Migrant into the Laurentian Great Lakes". Journal of Phycology. 16 (3): 412–420. Bibcode:1980JPcgy..16..412S. doi:10.1111/j.1529-8817.1980.tb03053.x. S2CID 86505593.
- Pueschel, Curt M.; Cole, Kathleen M. (1980). "Phytoferritin in the red alga Constantinea (Cryptonemiales)". Journal of Ultrastructure Research. 73 (3): 282–287. doi:10.1016/S0022-5320(80)90087-8. PMID 7230320.
- Lindstrom, Sandra C.; Cole, Kathleen M. (1990). "An evaluation of species relationships in the Porphyra perforata complex (Bangiales, Rhodophyta) using starch gel electrophoresis". Thirteenth International Seaweed Symposium. pp. 179–183. doi:10.1007/978-94-009-2049-1_25. ISBN 978-94-010-7419-3.
- Henry, Eric C.; Cole, Kathleen M. (1982). "Ultrastructure of Swarmers in the Laminariales (Phaeophyceae). I. Zoospores". Journal of Phycology. 18 (4): 550–569. Bibcode:1982JPcgy..18..550H. doi:10.1111/j.1529-8817.1982.tb03222.x. S2CID 84812751.
- Henry, Eric C.; Cole, Kathleen M. (1982). "Ultrastructure of Swarmers in the Laminariales (Phaeophyceae). Ii. Sperm". Journal of Phycology. 18 (4): 570–579. Bibcode:1982JPcgy..18..570H. doi:10.1111/j.1529-8817.1982.tb03223.x. S2CID 221895775.
- Cole, Kathleen M.; Hymes, Beverly J.; Sheath, Robert G. (1983). "Karyotypes and Reproductive Seasonality of the Genus Bangia (Rhodophyta) in British Columbia, Canada1". Journal of Phycology. 19 (2): 136–145. Bibcode:1983JPcgy..19..136C. doi:10.1111/j.0022-3646.1983.00136.x. S2CID 84748489.
- Cole, Kathleen M.; Park, Carol M.; Reid, Philip E.; Sheath, Robert G. (2004). "Comparative Studies on the Cell Walls of Sexual and Asexual Bangia Atropurpurea (Rhodophyta). I. Histochemistry of Polysaccharides1". Journal of Phycology. 21 (4): 585–592. doi:10.1111/j.0022-3646.1985.00585.x. S2CID 86139521.
- Sheath, Robert G.; Morison, Mary O.; Korch, Judith E.; Kaczmarczyk, Donald; Cole, Kathleen M. (1986). "Distribution of stream macroalgae in south-central Alaska". Hydrobiologia. 135 (3): 259–269. Bibcode:1986HyBio.135..259S. doi:10.1007/BF00006538. S2CID 32092638.
- Sheath, Robert G.; Cole, Kathleen M. (1990). "Differential alcian blue staining in freshwater Rhodophyta". British Phycological Journal. 25 (3): 281–285. doi:10.1080/00071619000650281.
- Lindstrom, Sandra C.; Cole, Kathleen M. (1992). "A revision of the species of Porphyra (Rhodophyta: Bangiales) occurring in British Columbia and adjacent waters". Canadian Journal of Botany. 70 (10): 2066–2075. Bibcode:1992CaJB...70.2066L. doi:10.1139/b92-256.
- Lindstrom, S. C.; Cole, K. M. (1992). "The Porphyra lanceolata–P. Pseudolanceolata (Bangiales, Rhodophyta) complex unmasked: Recognition of new species based on isozymes, morphology, chromosomes and distributions". Phycologia. 31 (5): 431–448. Bibcode:1992Phyco..31..431L. doi:10.2216/i0031-8884-31-5-431.1.
- Sheath, Robert G.; Cole, Kathleen M. (1992). "Biogeography of Stream Macroalgae in North America1". Journal of Phycology. 28 (4): 448–460. Bibcode:1992JPcgy..28..448S. doi:10.1111/j.0022-3646.1992.00448.x. S2CID 86566531.
- Sheath, Robert G.; Vis, Morgan L.; Cole, Kathleen M. (1993). "Distribution and systematics of the freshwater red algal family Thoreaceae in North America". European Journal of Phycology. 28 (4): 231–241. Bibcode:1993EJPhy..28..231S. doi:10.1080/09670269300650341.
- Lindstrom, Sandra C.; Cole, Kathleen M. (1993). "The systematics of Porphyra: Character evolution in closely related species". Hydrobiologia. 260–261 (1): 151–157. Bibcode:1993HyBio.260..151L. doi:10.1007/BF00049014. S2CID 24815472.
- Sheath, Robert G.; Muller, Kirsten M.; Larson, David J.; Cole, Kathleen M. (1995). "Incorporation of Freshwater Rhodophyta into the Cases of Caddisflies (Trichoptera) from North America". Journal of Phycology. 31 (6): 889–896. Bibcode:1995JPcgy..31..889S. doi:10.1111/j.0022-3646.1995.00889.x. S2CID 84545104.
- Vis, Morgan L.; Sheath, Robert G.; Cole, Kathleen M. (1996). "Distribution and systematics of Batrachospermum(Batrachospermales, Rhodophyta) in North America. 8b. Section Batrachospermum: Previously described species excluding Batrachospermum gelatinosum". European Journal of Phycology. 31 (2): 189–199. Bibcode:1996EJPhy..31..189V. doi:10.1080/09670269600651371.
- Müller, Kirsten M.; Sheath, Robert G.; Vis, Morgan L.; Crease, Teresa J.; Cole, Kathleen M. (1998). "Biogeography and systematics of Bangia (Bangiales, Rhodophyta) based on the Rubisco spacer, RBCL gene and 18S rRNA gene sequences and morphometric analyses. 1. North America". Phycologia. 37 (3): 195–207. Bibcode:1998Phyco..37..195M. doi:10.2216/i0031-8884-37-3-195.1.
- Müller, Kirsten M.; Cole, Kathleen M.; Sheath, Robert G. (2003). "Systematics of Bangia (Bangiales, Rhodophyta) in North America. II. Biogeographical trends in karyology: Chromosome numbers and linkage with gene sequence phylogenetic trees". Phycologia. 42 (3): 209–219. Bibcode:2003Phyco..42..209M. doi:10.2216/i0031-8884-42-3-209.1. S2CID 84418460.
