= Ludshott Common and Waggoners Wells =

Nature reserve in Hampshire, England

Coordinates: 51°6′12″N 0°46′10.45″W

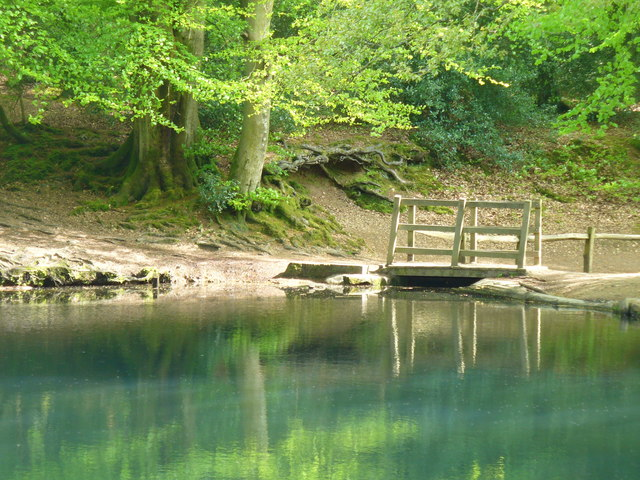
The middle pond, Waggoners Wells

Ludshott Common and Waggoners Wells (the latter sometimes written with an apostrophe: Waggoners' Wells) is a National Trust reserve; Ludshott Common is an area of heathland and Waggoners Wells a series of man-made ponds with a connecting stream. The reserve is situated between Grayshott, Bramshott and Headley Down in East Hampshire, England. To the south is the large heathland area of Bramshott Common. Some 415 acres (168 ha) is under the care of the Woodland Trust.

== Ludshott Common ==
=== Description ===
Ludshott Common is one of the largest remaining areas of heathland in East Hampshire. It lies parallel to and south of the B3002 road between Headley Down to the west and Grayshott to the east. It covers 285 hectares (700 acres) and is designated a Site of Special Scientific Interest (SSSI) and Special Protection Area (SPA) due to the number of endangered species, including woodlark, nightjar and Dartford warbler. There are also a great many spiders and butterflies, including silver-studded blue, grayling and green hairstreak. Adders, grass snakes and sand lizards also inhabit the common. Rabbits are widespread and roe deer may occasionally be seen. The most common trees are Scots pine and silver birch, with some oak.

While much of the common is heather and gorse scrub on a fine sandy soil, there was an elevated stand of mature Scots pine trees with little or no undergrowth known locally as "the cathedral" or "cathedral pines". Many had been removed by the end of 2020, owing to their roots having been damaged by fires.

In 2013 consultations were underway with a view to seeking permission to resume grazing on 550 acres of the common.

=== History ===
Ludshott Common constituted half of the ancient Manor of Ludshott, in the Hundred of Neatham, dating back to Saxon times. It is described as being under the lordship of Hugh de Port in the Domesday Book of 1086, where it was listed as comprising 10 households; in 1066 the overlord had been King Edward the Confessor. Court baron rolls go back to about 1400.

Ludshott Common owes its present state to the traditional use made of common land by local people: to graze their cattle, pigs, sheep, and ponies and to collect gorse, heather, wood, and bracken for fuel, and for animal bedding and winter fodder. Such uses ceased around the beginning of the 20th century. The land was acquired by the National Trust in 1908 in response to the growing pressure from housing development in Headley Down.

During the Second World War in the 1940s, Ludshott Common was used as a tank manoeuvres training ground, and the heather was largely turned to mud. The heather recovered, and was managed from the 1970s onwards. A camp (named Superior Camp) for Canadian troops, one of several in the vicinity, was built at the eastern corner of the common. Evidence of the layout can be seen even though it was demolished in the 1950s/1960s.

Periodically, fires would break out on the common. In 1962, 200 acres (0.81 km^{2}) were burnt and, in 1965, 400 acres (1.6 km^{2}). Further serious fires occurred in 1969 and 1976, the latter being the worst ever known in Hampshire, spreading rapidly and burning 600 acres (2.4 km^{2}), lasting eight days. On 12 May 1980, 600 of the 695 acres (2.81 km^{2}) were burnt by a fire fanned by high winds. Residents of roads in Headley Down which bordered the common were evacuated. Firefighters brought the fire under control in just over seven hours at 19:55. Relief crews remained on site overnight controlling small outbreaks of fire and damping down, with further relief crews taking over at 06:00 the following morning.

== Waggoners Wells ==
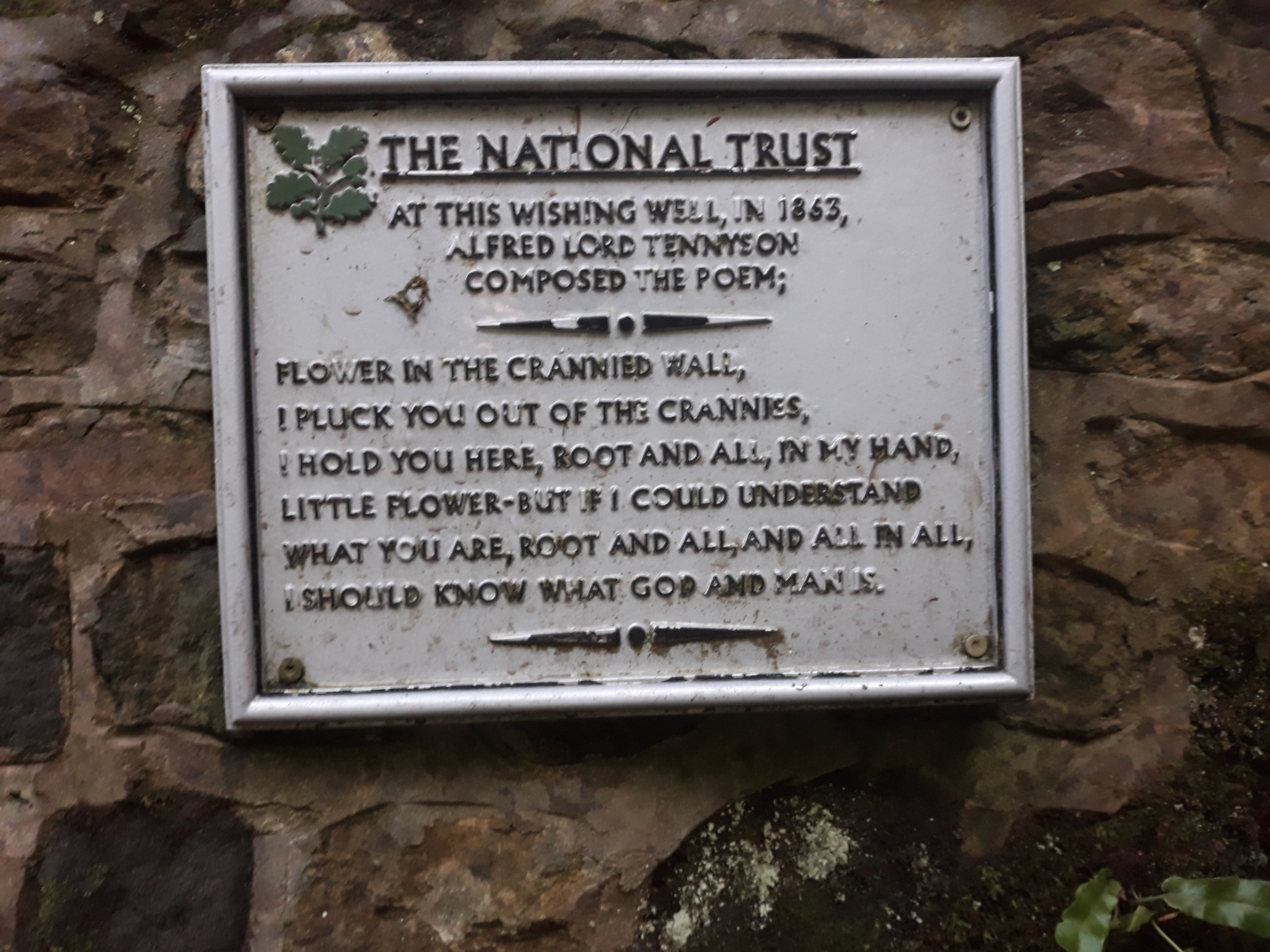
Wishing well plaque commemorating composition of Flower in the Crannied Wall

Waggoners Wells is set amongst woodland in a steep valley situated between Ludshott Common to the north west and Bramshott Common to the south east.

The original name of the series of ponds was Wakeners' Wells. They were created in the 17th century by the Hooke family of Bramshott. They were possibly originally intended as hammer ponds, that is, to serve the local iron industry, but they appear never to have been so used. The woodland surrounding the ponds is notable for its mature beech trees.

Vehicular access is via Waggoners Wells Lane from Grayshott as far as the ford and a small car park beyond; the lane originally continued south-eastwards to Kingswood Lane, and thence to the London to Portsmouth road (A3), but today only a footpath through the woodland remains.

Catch and release fishing for carp, roach, tench, perch and other species is a popular pursuit, as is nature rambling and birdwatching.

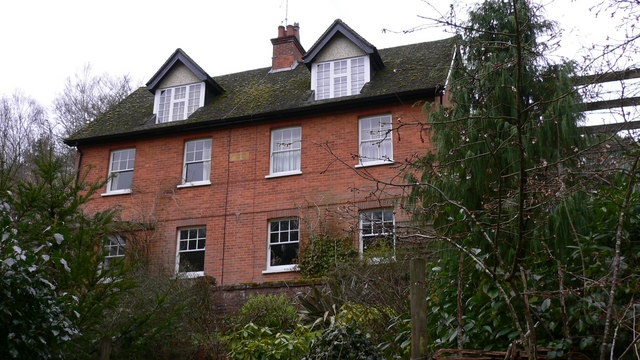
Summerden

The stream that emerges from the pond furthest to the south-west is called Cooper's Stream. The house situated at the bottom of the ponds is Summerden and is a private residence of the National Trust warden of the area. Near it is a wishing well, mentioned by Flora Thompson in her writings of the locality, and recorded by a National Trust plaque as being the place at which Alfred, Lord Tennyson was inspired to compose his short poem Flower in the Crannied Wall. The stream flowing from Waggoners Wells runs west to Standford, around the west of Headley, and eventually into the River Wey. The stream powered many mills that worked ironworks, including Headley Mill. Paper mills were also run along the water that flowed from Waggoners Wells.

The gatefold photo of Fleetwood Mac's 1973 album Penguin was shot on location at Waggoners Wells.
