= Grayshott =

Village and parish in Hampshire, England

Coordinates: 51.11031°N 0.75437°W

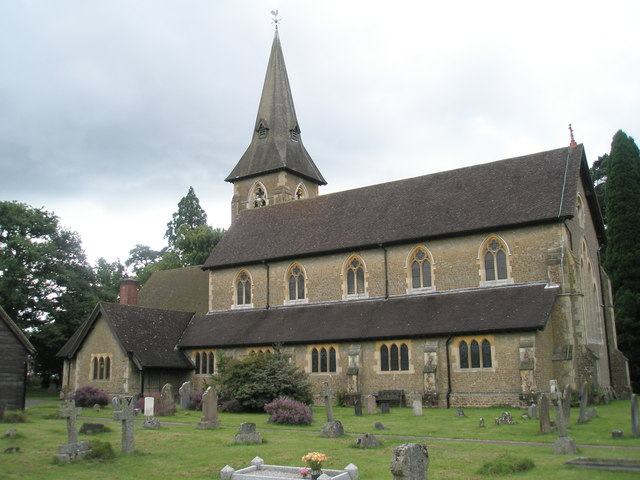
- Parish church of St Luke

- Location within Hampshire
- Population: 2,413 (2011 Census)
- OS grid reference: SU872353
- Civil parish: Grayshott
- District: East Hampshire
- Shire county: Hampshire
- Region: South East
- Country: England
- Sovereign state: United Kingdom
- Post town: Hindhead
- Postcode district: GU26
- Dialling code: 01428
- Police: Hampshire and Isle of Wight
- Fire: Hampshire and Isle of Wight
- Ambulance: South Central
- UK Parliament: East Hampshire

Grayshott is a village and civil parish in the East Hampshire district of Hampshire, England. It is on the Hampshire / Surrey border 4 miles (6.4 km) northwest of Haslemere by road, and 46 miles (74 km) southwest of central London. The nearest rail link is Haslemere railway station.

The present village consists of houses and shops on either side of the B3002 Headley Road, which leads from the A333 at Hindhead to Headley Down, Headley and Bordon, and Crossways Road which runs south east from the centre of the village. East of the village centre, joining these two roads, is Boundary Road, which marks the boundary between Hampshire and Surrey.

Originally, the name referred to a hamlet a mile west of the present village.

Grayshott was part of Headley parish until 1901 (ecclesiastical parish) and 1902 (civil parish). The present civil parish is part of East Hampshire District. There are three listed buildings in the parish.

== History ==
The earliest reference to Grayshott found by Jack Hayden Smith, a Grayshott inhabitant and local historian, is in Winchester Bishopric records as Gravesetta (1185) and Graveschete (1200). In 1533 it was called Graveshotte, and the named changed to its current spelling probably in the 18th century. J H Smith's book was republished in 2002 by John Owen Smith. A detailed survey of the area made in the reign of Edward VI (1547–53) used the name Graueshot and describes large areas of "waste". The shott suffix in local names refers to springs flowing from the sandstone rock strata.

The village is mentioned in the Headley Parish Register of 1564 as Grashott, and as Grayshott in 1584. At this time the name applied to a hamlet about a mile to the west of the present village; the latter, apart from a few isolated dwellings, did not begin to develop until the 19th century when wealthy incomers began to settle there and encourage development. Previously, the area had a reputation for lawlessness.

At the earliest census, 1841, Grayshott had 114 inhabitants, increasing gradually over the rest of the century and then more than doubling between 1891 (238) and 1901 (666). This was the result of the growing popularity of the Hindhead area's healthy climate, the accessibility afforded by the railway coming to Haslemere in 1859 and the subsequent rise in trade to accommodate this popularity.

Two notable murders took place in the early 20th century. In 1901, postmaster Walter Chapman stabbed to death his wife Emily and was found guilty but insane and committed to Broadmoor Hospital. In 1915 Lieutenant Codere murdered Sergeant Ozanne (both of the Canadian Rifles stationed at Bramshott Camp) at Codere's billet in Crossways Road. Codere was found guilty and sentenced to hang, but the sentence was later commuted to life imprisonment on the grounds of insanity.

== Amenities ==
St. Luke's Church, whose tower and spire (added in 1910) combined are 100 feet tall, was begun in 1898 and consecrated in 1900. It is a part of the Guildford diocese. It is a Grade II listed building. St Joseph's Roman Catholic Church in Headley Road, also a Grade II listed building was built in 1911.

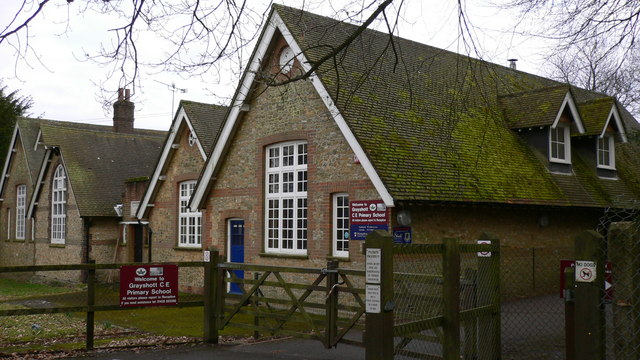
Grayshott Primary School

Grayshott CE Primary School traces its origins to the 19th century. The National School was founded in 1871 on land provided by the architect Edward I'Anson, who had moved to the village ten years earlier. His descendants maintained a close connection to the area (his son made funds available for the construction of the church) and many of these are buried and memorialised in its churchyard.

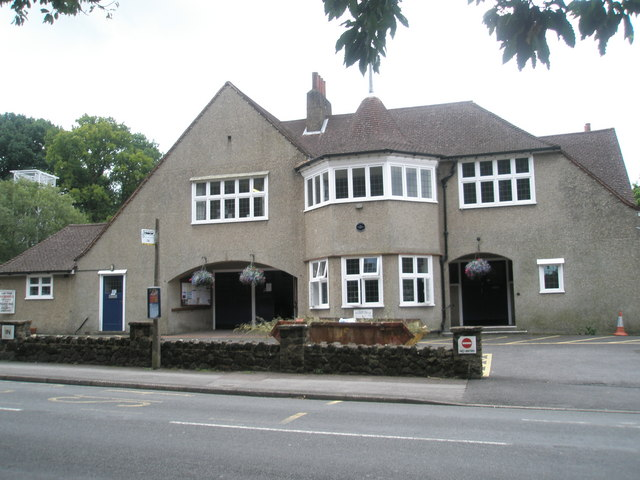
Grayshott Village Hall

Grayshott Village Hall claims to be the largest in the county, and the village has its own retained fire station. A village square and two village greens are close to the centre.

To the west of the village there is a recreation ground with cricket pavilion, football club, skate park and tennis club.

There is a long history of amateur drama in the village, beginning before World War 1 and continuing to the present day. The Grayshott Stagers have held this mantle since 1951.

The Grayshott area is popular with walkers, including nearby Waggoners Wells. Ludshott Common, one mile to the west, is an area of heathland and woodland and part of the East Hampshire Area of Outstanding Natural Beauty; one mile to the east is Hindhead and the Devil's Punch Bowl, a site of special scientific interest, and to the north is the Golden Valley, a densely wooded valley between the B3002 and A287 roads.

In School Road is Grayshott Pottery (formally known as Surrey Ceramics), which has been making English stoneware since 1956. It now incorporates Dartington Pottery which originated in Devon.

There is one public house in the village, the Fox and Pelican. It was opened in 1899 by shareholders of the Grayshott & District Refreshment Association, one of whom was George Bernard Shaw, under the guidelines of the national Refreshment House Association, a temperance-based organisation. In 1914 the landlord was James Ashbrooke Holme, a lay reader from Bishopstoke, Hampshire. His wife Charlotte had been one of the survivors of the Titanic sinking.

== Notable people ==
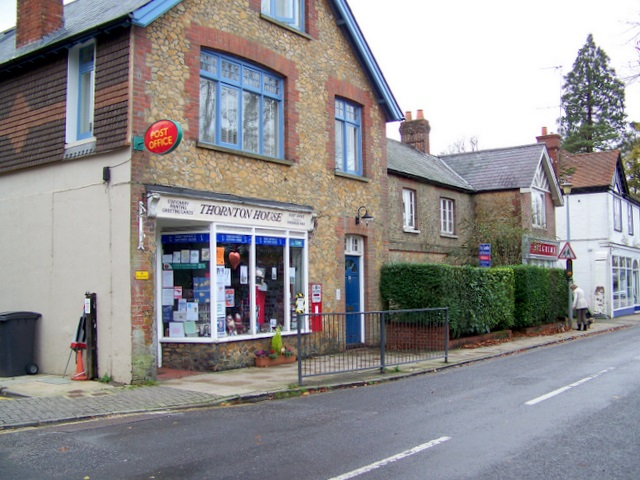
Post Office, Crossways Road

The Grayshott Village Archive website has a page on notable former village residents with biographical and historical detail.

From 1898 to 1900 Flora Thompson, author of Lark Rise to Candleford, was assistant postmistress in Grayshott and lived in The Avenue. Among her customers were Arthur Conan Doyle, who lived at Undershaw (which became the Undershaw Hotel, now a school for pupils with special needs) next to Hindhead crossroads, and George Bernard Shaw, who lived at Blen Cathra, Boundary Road, now St Edmund's School, Hindhead.

Dame Agnes Weston (1840–1918), philanthropist and founder of the Royal Naval Sailors' Rests, lived in Crossways Road for a number of years. The Anglo-Dutch performer and silent film actress Margie Morris (1892–1983) died in Grayshott.

Towards Headley Down is the health farm Grayshott Spa. This building, known as Grayshott Hall, is on the site of a small farm which Alfred Tennyson and his family rented in 1867 while he had Aldworth built nearby in Haslemere.

Grayshott is the birthplace of actor Colin Firth, best known for his appearances in films such as Bridget Jones's Diary, Mamma Mia!, A Single Man and The King's Speech.

Musician Alexander O’Connor, known professionally as Rex Orange County is from Grayshott.

Former England table tennis player Alison Broe resides in Grayshott.
