= George Hubbard Blakeslee =

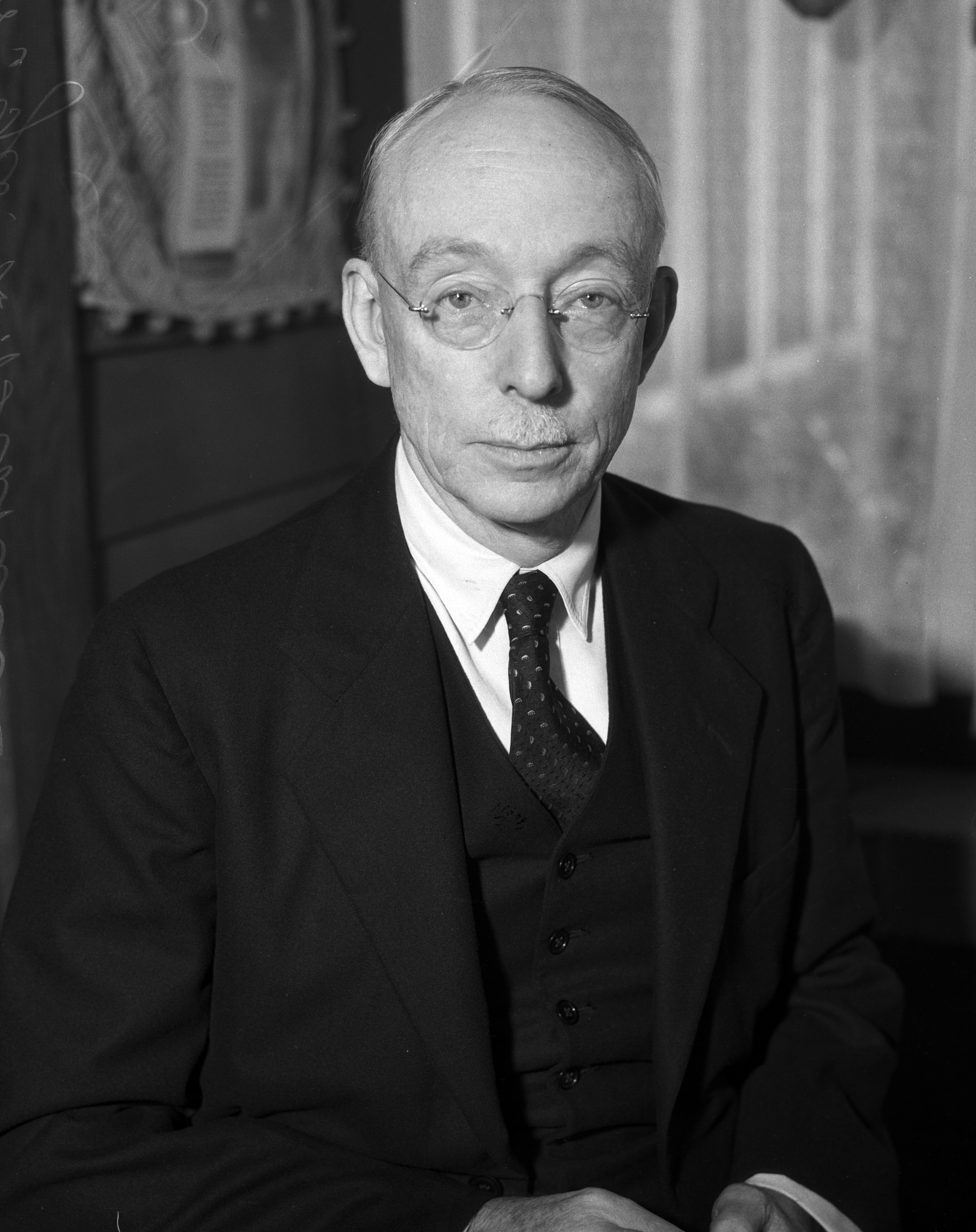
Blakeslee in 1932

George Hubbard Blakeslee (August 27, 1871 in Geneseo, New York – May 5, 1954) was an academic, professor of history and international relations at Clark University, and a founder (along with G. Stanley Hall) of the Journal of Race Development, the first American journal devoted to international relations. This journal was later renamed the Journal of International Relations, which in turn was merged with Foreign Affairs.

Born in Geneseo, New York, he was the brother of the botanist Albert Francis Blakeslee. Having graduated from Wesleyan University (A.B.1893, A.M. 1897), George Blakeslee then studied at Leipzig University and Oxford University between 1901 and 1903. He received his Ph.D. from Harvard University in 1903. He was elected a member of the American Antiquarian Society in 1908.

Blakeslee participated in a number of international bodies: the Washington Disarmament Conference of 1921, the Lytton Commission of 1931–32, and in 1942 led the Far Eastern Unit that was a subcommittee of the Advisory Committee on Postwar Foreign Policy at the State Department. This unit, though its designation changed several times before the US occupation of Japan, led to the post-World War II Far Eastern Commission on which he served. He was also a member of the board of trustees of the World Peace Foundation.

He died at Worcester, Massachusetts in 1954.

== Works (partial list) ==
- Japan and Japanese-American Relations (editor) (1912)
