= Albert Francis Blakeslee =

American botanist (1874–1954)

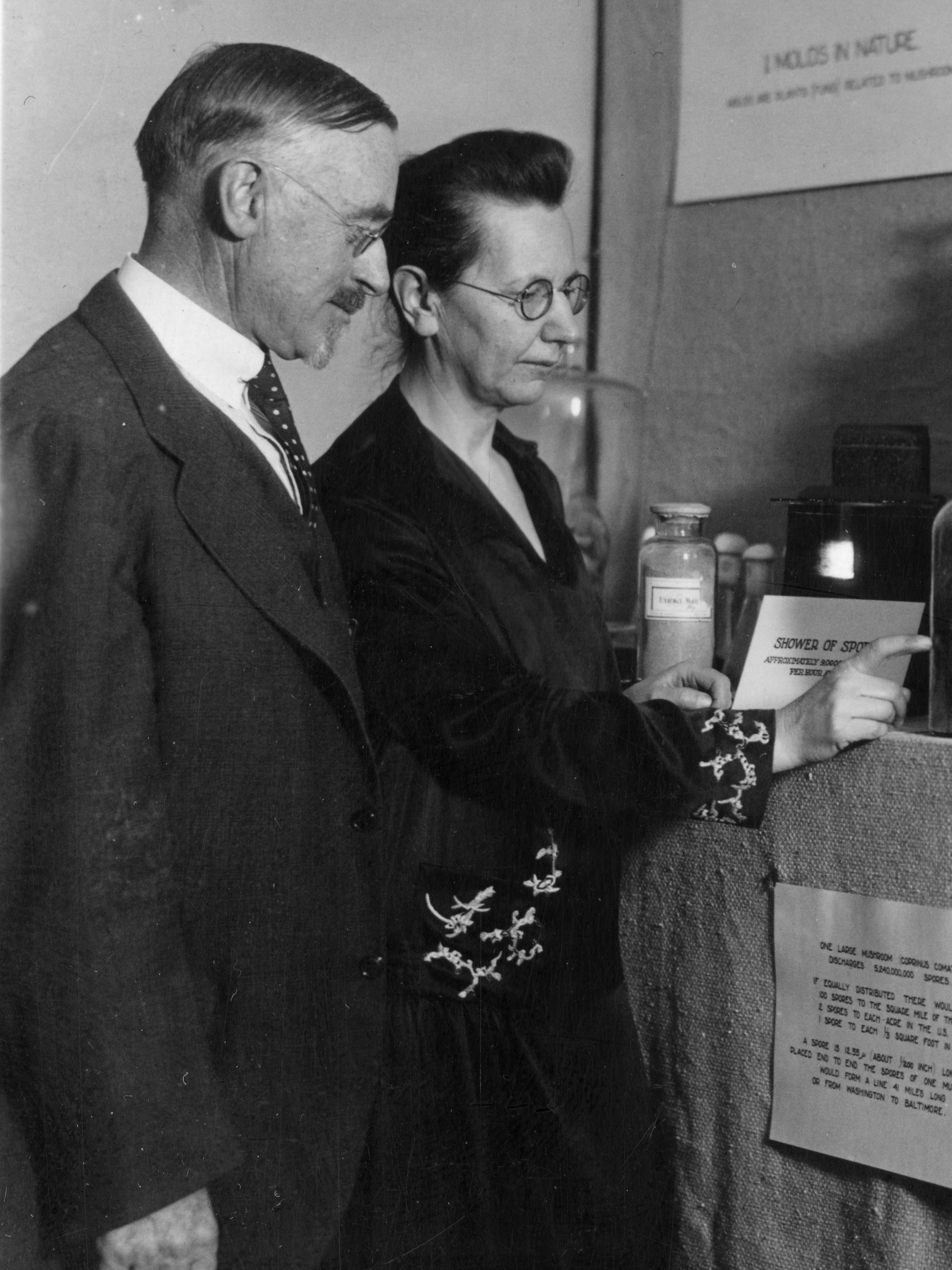
- Albert Francis Blakeslee and Sophia A. Satina
- Born: November 9, 1874; Geneseo, New York
- Died: November 16, 1954 (aged 80); Northampton, Massachusetts
- Education: Wesleyan University, Harvard University (Ph.D.), University of Halle-Wittenberg
- Known for: Use of jimsonweed as a model organism
- Spouse: Margaret Dickson Bridges
- Parents: Francis Durbin Blakeslee (father); Augusta Miranda Hubbard Blakeslee (mother)
- Relatives: George Hubbard Blakeslee (brother)
- Awards: Bowdoin Prize
- Scientific career
- Fields: Botany
- Workplaces: Carnegie Institution, Smith College
- Doctoral students: Kathleen Margaret Cole
- Author abbrev. (botany): Blakeslee

Albert Francis Blakeslee (November 9, 1874 – November 16, 1954) was an American botanist. He is best known for his research on the poisonous jimsonweed plant and the sexuality of fungi. He was the brother of the Far East scholar George Hubbard Blakeslee.

== Early life and education ==
Albert Francis Blakeslee was born on November 9, 1874, in Geneseo, New York, to Augusta Miranda Hubbard Blakeslee and Francis Durbin Blakeslee, a Methodist minister.

Blakeslee attended Wesleyan University, graduating in 1896. At Wesleyan, Blakeslee played several sports and won academic prizes in mathematics and chemistry.

He received a master's degree from Harvard University in 1900 and a doctorate in 1904. He also studied at the University of Halle-Wittenberg in Germany from 1904 to 1906.

== Career ==
After graduating from Wesleyan, Blakeslee taught at the Montpelier Seminary in Vermont, as well as at the East Greenwich Academy.

His first professorship was at the Connecticut Agricultural College, now known as the University of Connecticut. He was hired by the Carnegie Institution in 1915, eventually becoming its director.

In 1941, Blakeslee retired from the Carnegie Institution and returned to academia, accepting a professorship at Smith College. He would go on to direct the Smith College Genetics Experimentation Station.

=== Datura research ===
At Smith, he performed his research on jimsonweed. Blakeslee used the jimsonweed plant as a model organism for his genetic research. His experiments included using colchicine to achieve an increase in the number of chromosomes, which opened up a new field of research, creating artificial polyploids and aneuploids, and studying the phenotypic effects of polyploidy and of individual chromosomes.

Blakeslee was a leading figure in the genetics world in the decades before and after World War I. He worked with various plant and animal species, but finally decided on Datura. To farmers it was a stinking, noxious weed. In fact some people were seriously poisoned when they ate tomatoes grown from a scion that had been grafted onto a Jimson weed stock. But to Blakeslee Datura was “the very best plant with which to discover the principles of heredity.”

== Personal life ==
Blakeslee married Margaret Dickson Bridges in 1919.

Blakeslee died in Northampton, Massachusetts, on November 16, 1954. He was 80 years old.

== Awards and legacy ==
Blakeslee was awarded the Bowdoin Prize for this discovery of sexual fusion in fungi.

He was elected to the American Philosophical Society in 1924, the United States National Academy of Sciences in 1929, and the American Academy of Arts and Sciences in 1940.

== Selected works ==
- Blakeslee, Albert Francis (1904). "Sexual reproduction in the Mucorineae". Proceedings of the American Academy of Arts and Sciences. 40 (4): 203–328. doi:10.2307/20021962. JSTOR 20021962.
- Blakeslee, A. F. (1904). "Zygospore formation a sexual process". Science. Series 2. 19 (492): 864–866. Bibcode:1904Sci....19..864B. doi:10.1126/science.19.492.864. PMID 17812855.
- Blakeslee, A. F. (1905). "Two conidia-bearing fungi". Botanical Gazette. 40 (3): 161–170. doi:10.1086/328664. S2CID 84464925.
- "Zygospore germinations in the Mucorinae". Annales Mycologici. 4 (1): 1–28. 1906.
- Blakeslee, A. F. (1906). "Zygospores and sexual strains in the common bread mould, Rhizopus nigricans". Science. Series 2. 24 (604): 118–222. Bibcode:1906Sci....24..118B. doi:10.1126/science.24.604.118. PMID 17772189.
- "New England trees in winter". Bulletin of the Storrs Agricultural Experiment Station. 69: 307–578. 1911.
- "Conjugation in the heterogamic genus Zygorhynchus". Mycologische Centralblatt. 2: 241–244, plates 1–2. 1913.
- Trees in winter. Their study, planting, care and identification. New York: Macmillan Company. 1913.
- Blakeslee, A.F.; Avery, B.T. (1919). "Mutations in the Jimson weed". Journal of Heredity. 10 (3): 111–120. doi:10.1093/oxfordjournals.jhered.a101893.
- Blakeslee, A.F.; Warmke, H.E. (1938). Size of Seed and Other Criteria of Polyploids.
- Warmke, H.E.; Blakeslee, A.F. (1939). "Sex Mechanism In Polyploids Of Melandrium". Science. 89 (2313): 391–392. Bibcode:1939Sci....89..391W. doi:10.1126/science.89.2313.391. PMID 17742784.
- Blakeslee, A.F. (1941). The Induction of Polyploids and Their Genetic Significance.
