= Headley Down =

Village in Hampshire, England

Coordinates: 51.11892°N 0.79943°W

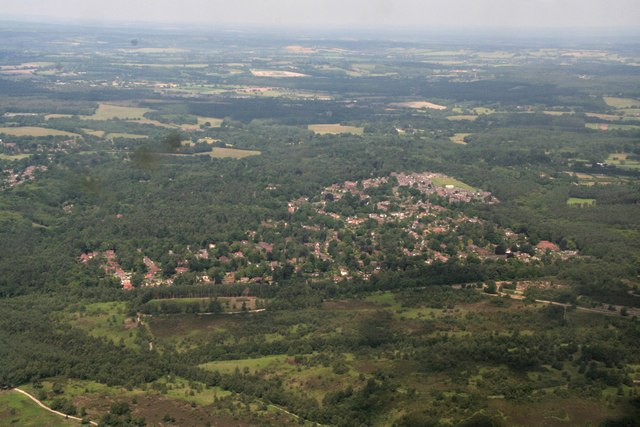
- Aerial view

- Location within Hampshire
- OS grid reference: SU840361
- Civil parish: Headley
- District: East Hampshire
- Shire county: Hampshire
- Region: South East
- Country: England
- Sovereign state: United Kingdom
- Post town: Bordon
- Postcode district: GU35 8
- Dialling code: 01428
- Police: Hampshire and Isle of Wight
- Fire: Hampshire and Isle of Wight
- Ambulance: South Central
- UK Parliament: East Hampshire

Headley Down is a village within the civil parish of Headley in the East Hampshire district of Hampshire, England, bounded on two sides by Ludshott Common, a National Trust heathland reserve. The village began with a few buildings in the 1870s and became a thriving community that in the 20th century outgrew the parish centre of Headley.

Headley Down is 36 miles (58 km) south west of London and 1 mile (1.6 km) east of Headley village centre. Nearby are the villages of Grayshott to the east and Churt to the north.

== History ==
Ludshott Common (formerly Headley Common) and Headley were both listed in the Domesday Survey of 1086. The area was called Headley Down on maps as early as 1801, and Headley Common on an Ordnance Survey map from the late 19th century, and from about the 1870s houses began to be built by people wishing to live or holiday in the healthy environment for which the Hindhead area was notable. It was part of the large and much older Wishanger Manor Estate, the records of which go back at least to 1167. The name Headley Down was not mentioned in the 1908 History of the County of Hampshire, but Headley Common is mentioned as an area likely to become popular as a residential neighbourhood. The side-roads in Headley Down were laid out in a grid system at least as early as 1909, rather than radiating out from a central point such as a church.

The Land of Nod estate predates Headley Down, possibly established in the early 18th century; an owner of the estate believed its name derived from an earlier incumbent by the name of Cane or Keyne, an excommunicant, and is a reference to the biblical story of Cain's banishment; the Elizabethan house Cain Manor and Cain Farm are associated with the estate, which lies mainly to the north of the village and had originally formed a part of the Manor of Wishanger. Kelly's Directory of 1895 lists J Henry Christian as a private resident of the Land of Nod.

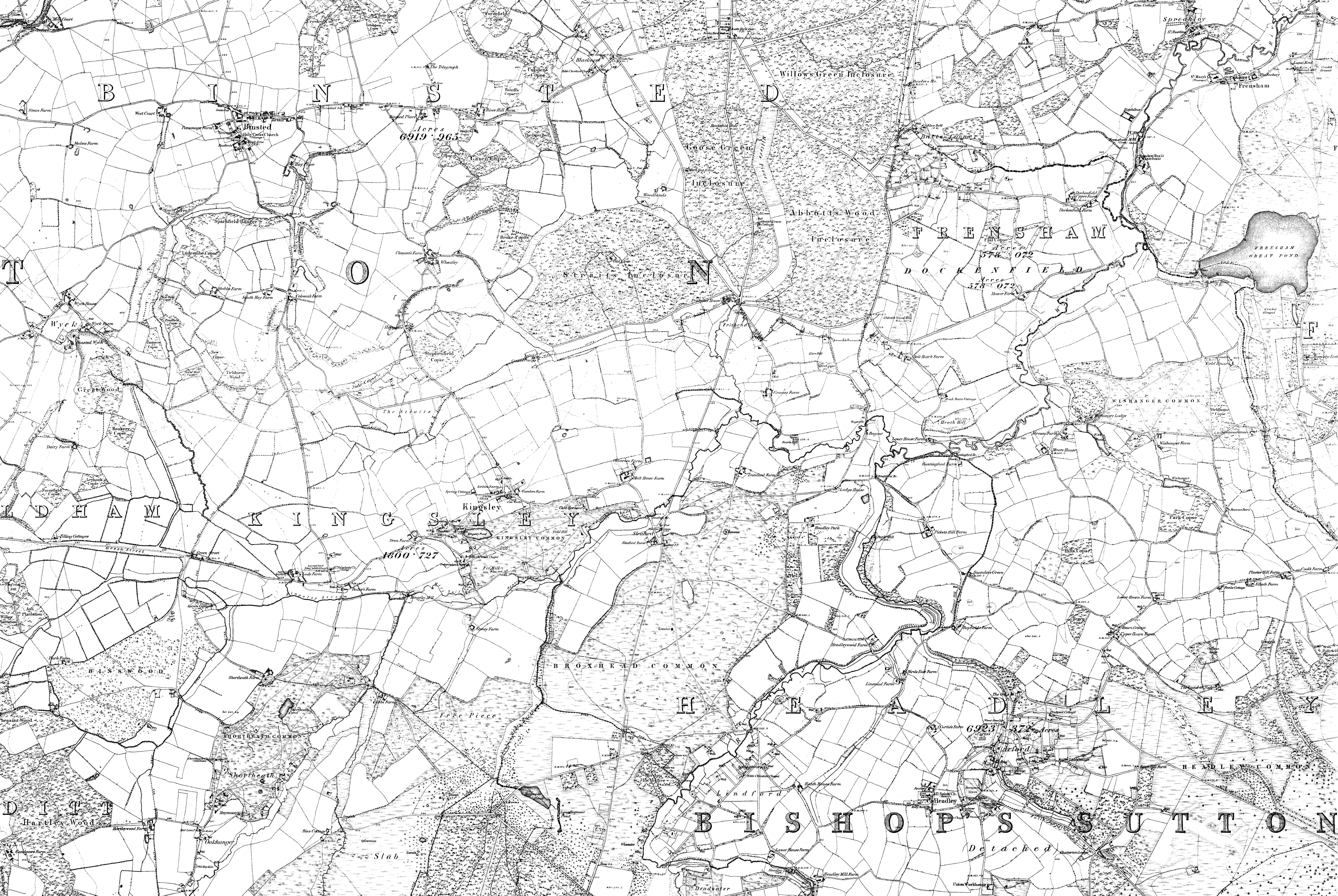
Extract from Map of Hampshire Sheet 036, Ordnance Survey 1st series (scale 1:10560), 1866-1889 showing Headley Common and The Land of Nod

Headley Down was formally named in March 1923 when the Post Office proclaimed that "the official name of the Telephone Call Office which has been established on Stone Hill will be Headley Down". A temporary wooden building in Carlton Road erected in the 1960s housed the post office, where it remained until incorporated into Whittle's store (subsequently Londis) in Eddeys Lane.

During the Second World War the area was home to several camps for Canadian soldiers. Erie camp was a military detention centre and was built on the Land of Nod estate owned by Major L Whitaker; it was designated by the War Office as a "Military Prison and Detention Barracks" from at least 1946 to 1948. The camp was subsequently occupied by civilians and gradually replaced by an estate of 350 houses and named Heatherlands. The estate was completed by 1977. From early April 1944, 107 Regiment Royal Armoured Corps (King's Own) trained with Churchill tanks on Headley Down in preparation for the invasion of Normandy. There were other military units based on Headley Down: on the current Windmill Estate, at the back of The Mount, and down Headley Hill Road and Barley Mow Hill.

In the 1950s Alfred Whittle opened a general store, butcher's and coal merchant in Eddeys Lane to accommodate Headley Down's increasing post-war population. The store and post office closed in 2015 after 65 years' service to the village.

"Penryn" was a home for children, mainly from London, in the post-war period until the 1980s when it was replaced by private housing, now called Penryn Drive.

Heatherlands estate houses approximately one fifth of the Headley parish population. In 2006, Heatherlands/Headley Down was considered to be the most deprived ward in East Hampshire. EHDC expressed the view that Headley's Parish Plan was not sufficiently inclusive of the whole parish. The Parish Council set out to explore ways to improve social inclusion and in 2007 produced a report with recommendations for action.

== Amenities ==
=== Transport ===
The main through road is the B3002 (Beech Hill/Grayshott Road) connecting Headley Down to the A333 (the old A3) at Hindhead via Grayshott to the east, and to the A325 at Bordon, via Headley and Lindford to the west.

The nearest railway station is 3.3 miles (5.3 km) south of the village, at Liphook.

The bus route serving Headley Down is Stagecoach 23, Alton to Haslemere.

=== Shops ===
- There is a One Stop local shop, a.k.a. M&W's, on the Heatherlands estate.
- Beech Hill Garage (formerly Wilson & Pickett Ltd) has stood at the crossroads at the top of Beech Hill for at least 50 years but closed in 2018. A Texaco petrol station with a Budgens store opened in spring 2019 on the site.

=== Education ===
There is no school in Headley Down; the nearest for up to 11 year olds is The Holme Church of England Controlled Primary School in Headley village.

=== Community ===
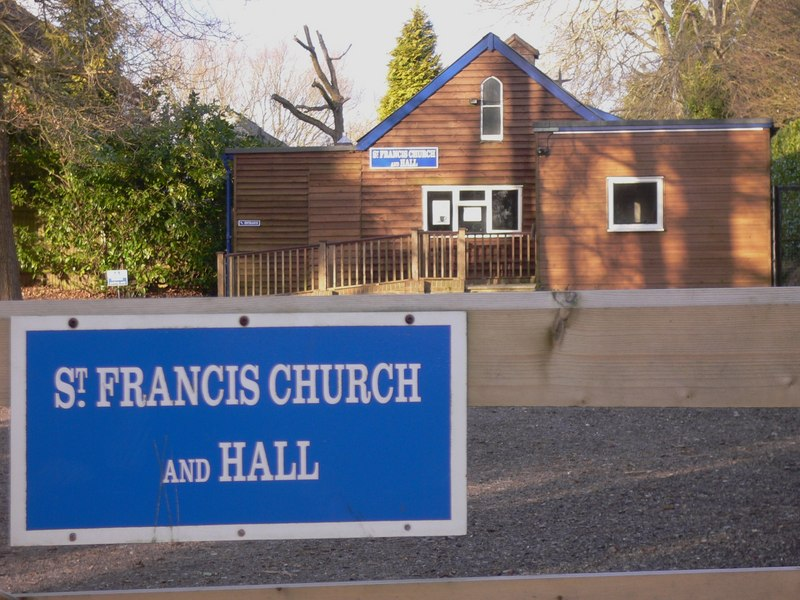
St Francis Church and Hall

- St Francis Community Church - An interdenominational church established in 1921 and dedicated in 1964.
- Headley Scouts - A Scout, Cub and Beaver Group meets at the Scout Centre on Beech Hill Road.
- Headley Down Community Association (HDCA) is a charity dedicated to the improvement of the local community.
- Naturism - Headley Down has been the home of a naturist establishment for many years; the Haslemere Sun Club (established 1947) is in Pond Road.
- The Heatherley Wood Greenacres burial park, with 12 acres of woodland and meadow, opened in 2015.

=== Environment ===
Ludshott Common, adjoining the eastern and southern boundary of the village, is one of the largest remaining areas of heathland in East Hampshire. A National Trust property, it covers 285 ha (705 acres) and is designated a Site of Special Scientific Interest (SSSI) and Special Protection Area (SPA) due to the number of endangered species, including woodlark, nightjar and Dartford warbler. There is also a great variety of spider and butterfly species, including the silver-studded blue, grayling and green hairstreak.

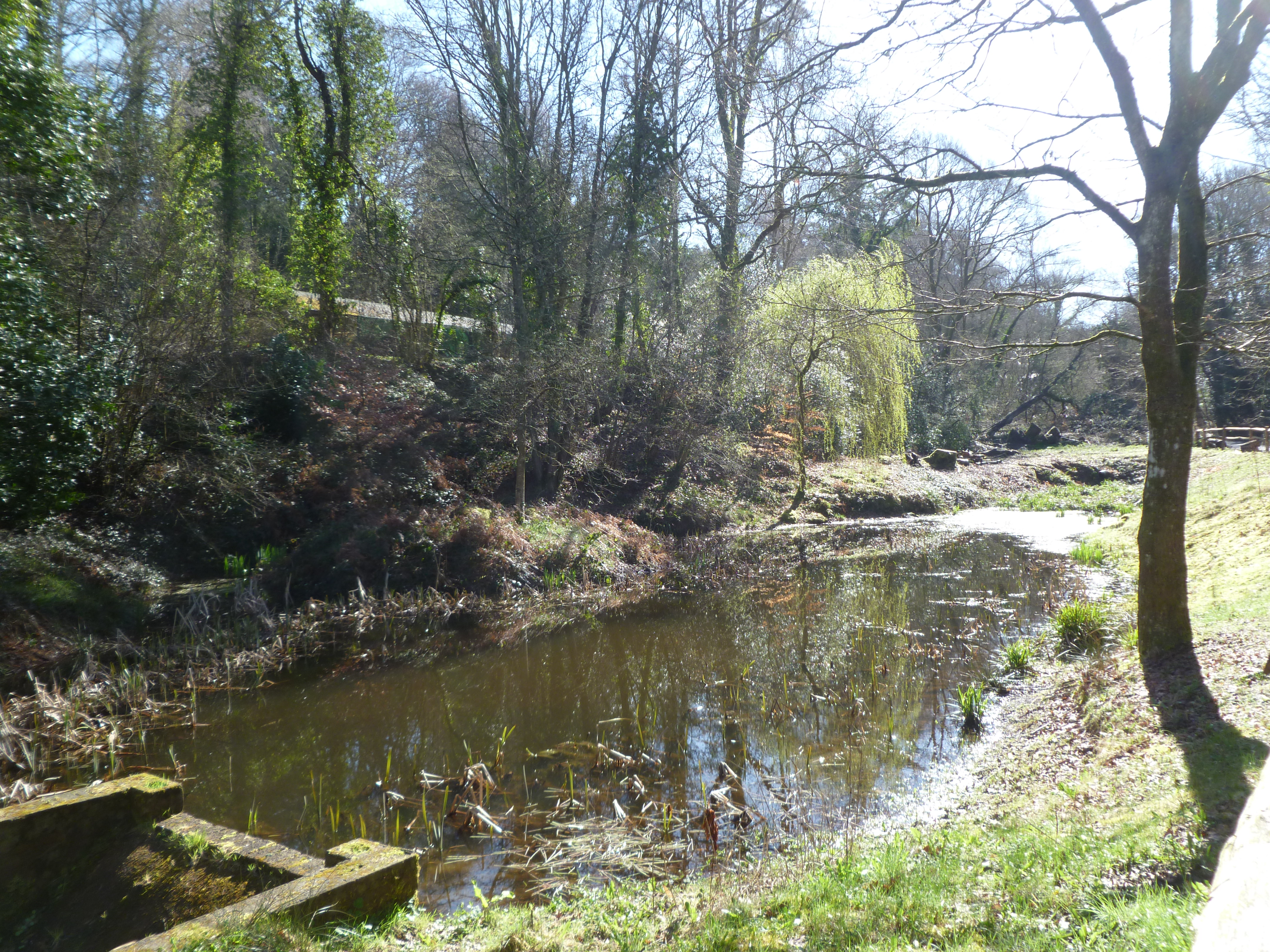
Fuller's Vale wildlife pond in early April 2023

Pond Road is so named for a pond that existed up until the 1970s when it was drained and subsequently attracted fly-tipping. Local residents remembered it had previously contained a wide variety of insect life, amphibians and fish, and attracted kingfishers. With the aid of local and county council grants it was re-established in 2003 and is now known as Fuller's Vale Wildlife Pond.

== Notable people ==
- Elizabeth Wilks died here having given the village sixteen new cottages and ten acres of woodland.
- The King of Norway (Haakon VII) lived in Headley Down for a time after his country was invaded by the Germans; the house, Stonedene, has since been demolished, replaced by a residential development called Stonedene Close. Stonedene, built in the 1890s, had been a childhood home of writer Anthony Powell.
- Lady Diana Spencer's first job after leaving finishing school (1977–78) was nanny with the Whitaker family of the Land of Nod.
- Major L I T Whitaker of the Land of Nod was High Sheriff of Hampshire in 1962.
