= Sophia Satina =

Russian botanist (1879–1975)

Sophia Alexsandrovna Satina
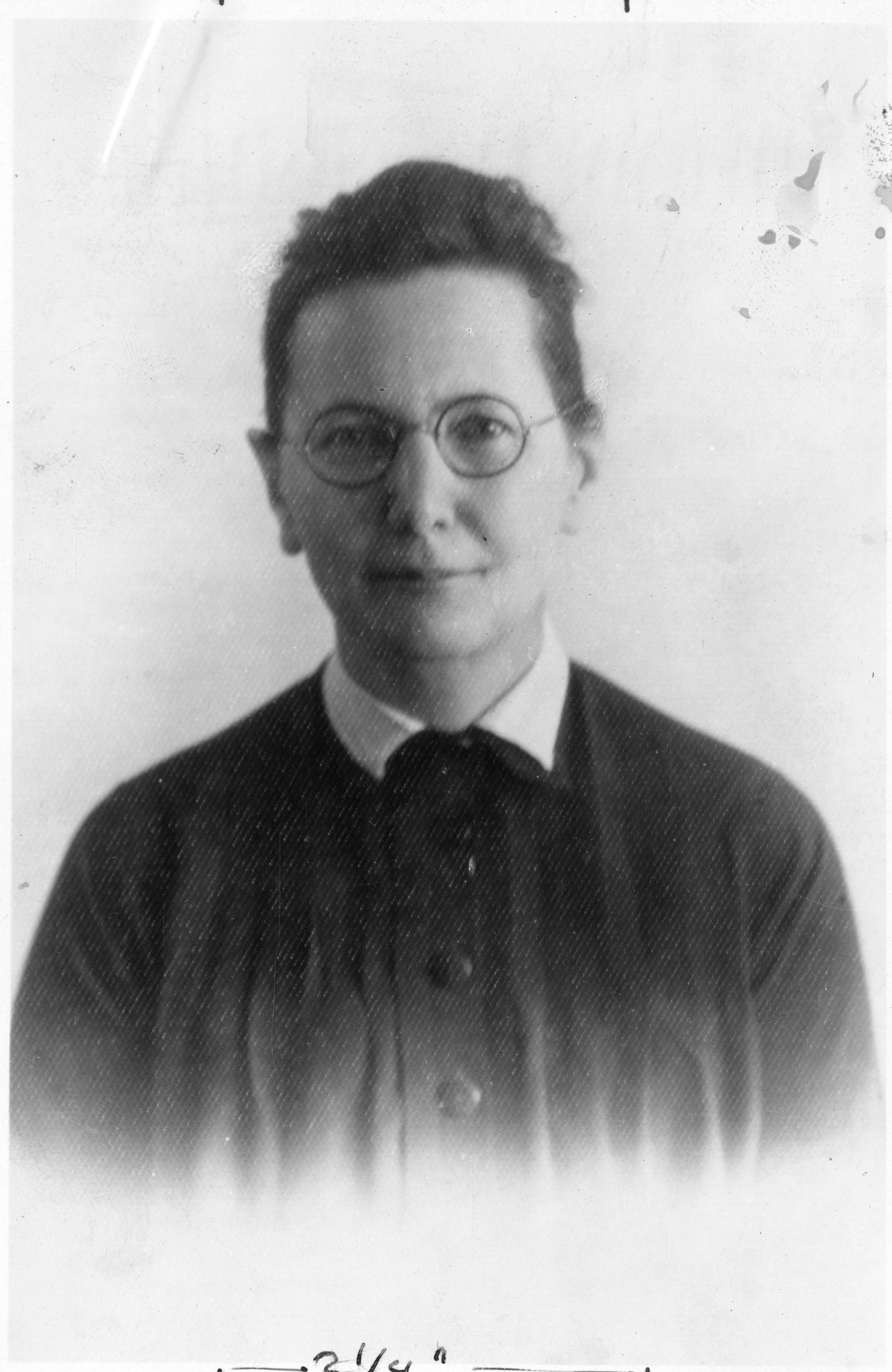
- Born: April 17, 1879; Tambov, Russia
- Died: February 24, 1975 (aged 95); New York City
- Education: Women's College of Moscow
- Scientific career
- Fields: Botany
- Workplaces: Smith College

Sophia Alexsandrovna Satina (April 17, 1879 – February 24, 1975) was a Russian botanist. She is best known for her research into growing the fungus Penicillium and her publications on women's education in Russia.

== Biography ==
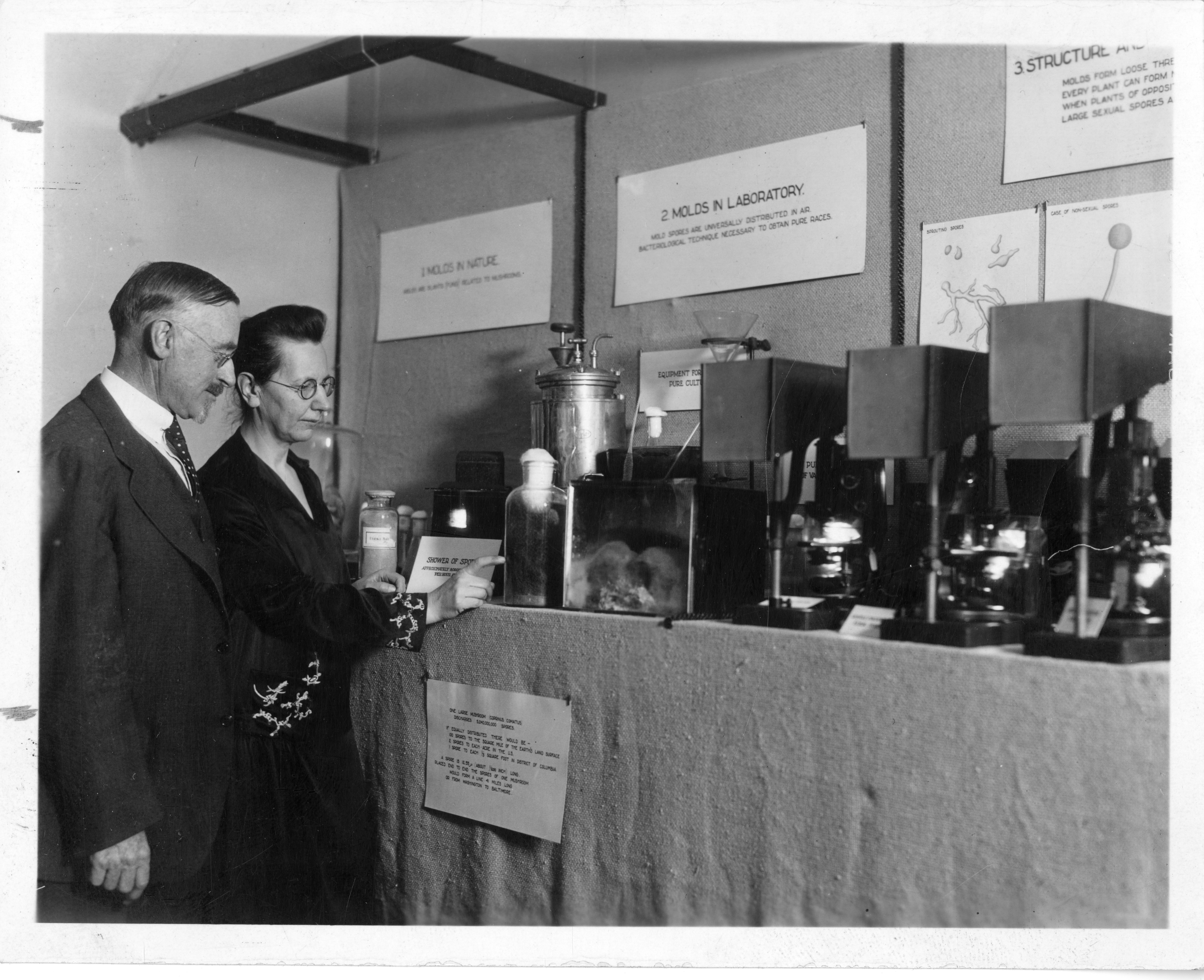
Sophia A. Satina and Albert Francis Blakeslee, shown with samples of mold

Satina was born on April 17, 1879, in Tambov, Russia. She was cousin to Sergei Rachmaninoff, and became his sister-in-law after Rachmaninoff married Satina's sister Natalia. They remained lifelong friends. Satina had a room in the Ivanovka estate, her family home.

Satina strongly advocated for women's education in the Russian Empire. She was part of the first graduating class of the Women's University in Moscow. She went on to become assistant professor in the Department of Botany, and helped open a botanical museum in Moscow. She emigrated from Russia to the United States in 1921.

Satina was brought on at Carnegie Research Laboratories, and her research at the Carnegie Institution of Washington was focused on plant tumors. She later joined the Genetics Experimental Station (GES) at Smith College as a research assistant. She worked closely with Albert Francis Blakeslee, and eventually became associate professor of botany at Smith and assistant director of the GES. She retired in 1955.

In 1956, as the "keeper of the memory" of Rachmaninoff, she helped with the publication of Sergei Rachmaninoff. A Lifetime in Music, a biography by Sergei Bertensson and Jay Leyda.

In 1966, she published Education of Women in Pre-Revolutionary Russia, detailing her own experiences in secondary school and higher education.

Satina died in New York City on February 24, 1975.
