= Blackmoor, Hampshire =

Village in Hampshire, England

Coordinates: 51.09587°N 0.88764°W

Blackmoor
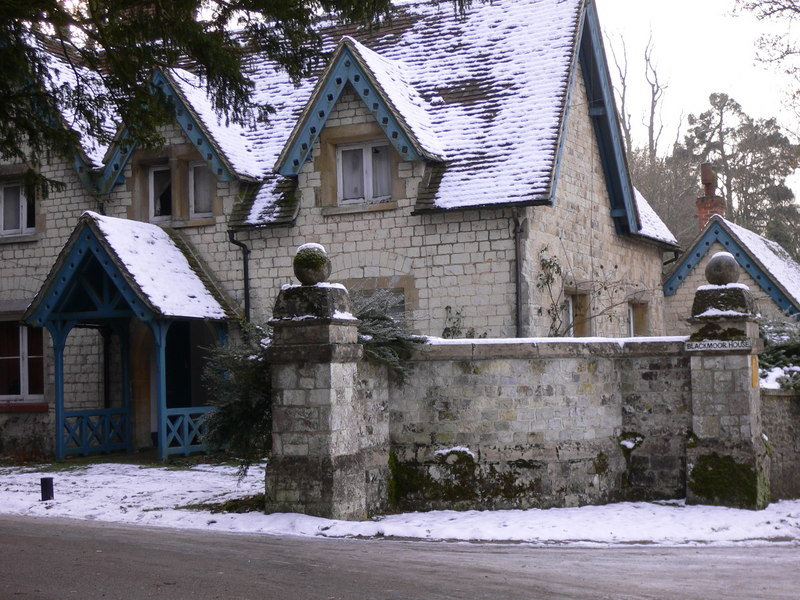
- Lodge at Blackmoor House

- Location within Hampshire
- OS grid reference: SU779335
- Civil parish: Selborne
- District: East Hampshire
- Shire county: Hampshire
- Region: South East
- Country: England
- Sovereign state: United Kingdom
- Post town: Liss
- Postcode district: GU33
- Police: Hampshire and Isle of Wight
- Fire: Hampshire and Isle of Wight
- Ambulance: South Central
- UK Parliament: East Hampshire

Blackmoor is a village in the East Hampshire district of Hampshire, England. It lies about 1.5 miles (2.5 km) southwest of Bordon, just west of the A325 road. It is part of the parish of Selborne, which together with nearby Oakhanger, covers an area of 7,915 acres (3,203 ha). The nearest railway station is 3.4 miles (5.4 km) south of the village, at Liss; although it was served by the Oakhanger Halt railway station on the Longmoor Military Railway until its closure.

The village has a long history, with Roman remains being found in the area.

== History ==
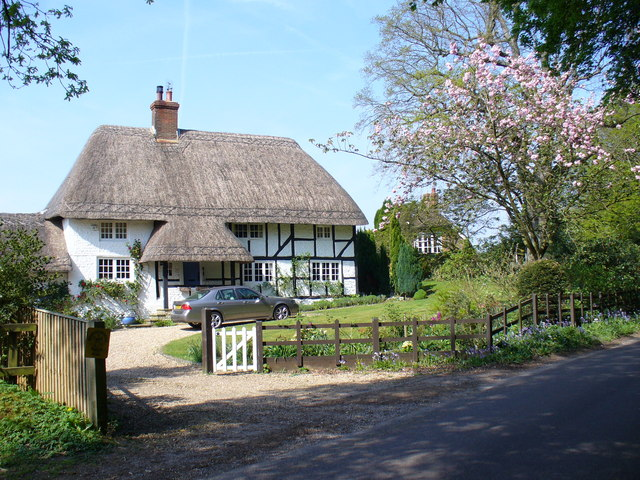
The Old Thatch

Roman remains including a grave have been found around the area.

Six acres, what would become the manor, were gifted to the Knight's Templar by the Crown in 1240. At chapel was first recorded at "Blakemere" in a tithe return from 1254 regarding the parish of Selborne.

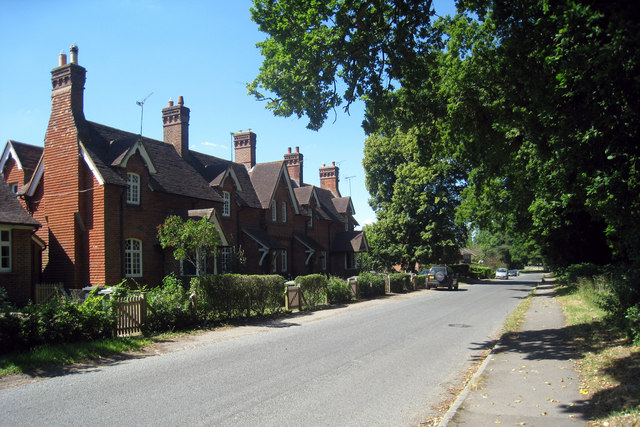
Row of cottages designed by Alfred Waterhouse

Blackmoor was once part of the royal demesne associated with the Woolmer Forest. In 1240, King Henry III granted 6 acres (2.4 ha) of land within his manor of "Blackmore" to the Knights Templar, allowing them to enclose the area with a ditch and hedgerows to prevent deer from entering or leaving. Later during the 13th century, Roger de Cherlecote granted land in Bradesate (modern-day Bradshott) to the Prior and Convent of Selborne. He had acquired the land from Laurence de Heyes, who held it as part of the tenure of Blackmoor on behalf of the Crown. This suggests that the manor of Blackmoor may have included Bradshott and was under the stewardship of Heyes.

The Heyes family remained connected to Blackmoor for several centuries. John de Heighes held a messuage and 12 acres in nearby Binsted in 1268 and is believed to have been either the father or son of Laurence de Heyes. Although there is no direct evidence, it is probable that John also held Blackmoor. In 1362, Simon de Heyesdied in possession of a messuage in Heyes, leaving a son, also named Simon. By 1399, a Richard Heyes—possibly the son of the younger Simon—was in possession of the same land. The manor of Blackmoor appears to have remained in the family’s custody through the early modern period.

Henry Heighes died in 1595 holding both the manor of Flood in Binsted and land at Heyes. Edmund Heyes was paying rent for the same holdings in 1600. By 1610, Nicholas Heyesheld the manors of Blackmoor and Flood, along with South Heigh, and settled them on his wife Martha. However, burdened by debt, he conveyed the manor of Flood to Richard Locke and Henry Wheeler in trust for the repayment of his debts. After the deaths of Nicholas and Locke, Martha brought legal action against Wheeler in 1620, accusing him of breaching his fiduciary duty and unlawfully seizing additional parts of her estate.

In the 18th and 19th centuries, the manor of Blackmoor changed ownership several times. It was eventually purchased in 1865 by Roundell Palmer, 1st Earl of Selborne in 1865, where he would commission architect Alfred Waterhouse to design St Matthew's Church, in addition to a school and cottages for the village as well as a new Blackmoor House. A majority of the village's surviving buildings were built between 1866 and 1882.

After a fire destroyed the roof of the original school, its premises were converted in the 1990s to Blackmoor Village Hall.

Blackmoor Conservation Area was designated in 1991, with East Hampshire District Council describing Blackmoor as "a textbook example of a Victorian estate village".

In 1870, several Bronze Age artefacts were discovered on the grounds of the Blackmoor Estate. The collection, later known as the Blackmoor Hoard, includes tools and weapons and is now held by Hampshire Cultural Trust.

Earlier, in 1867, during the rebuilding of Blackmoor House, a Roman bronze enamelled cup—referred to as the Selborne Cup—was unearthed on the site in the context of a burial. It dates to between 100 and 400AD and was purchased by Hampshire County Council Museums Service in 1983.

== Geography and demographics ==
Blackmoor is located in the east-central part of Hampshire, within South East England, approximately 1.7 miles (2.7 km) west of the town of Bordon. The village lies within the civil parish of Selborne, which covers an area of approximately 7,915 acres (32.03 km^{2}), including 105 acres (0.42 km^{2}) of water.

The surrounding landscape is characterised by farmland, heath, and patches of woodland, including nearby Shortheath Common, agricultural land around Blackmoor Farm, and portions of Woolmer Forest. The soil in the area is a wet, sandy loam, historically described as "remarkable for trees, but infamous for roads". Blackmoor lies in the southern part of the Selborne parish, with the villages of Oakhanger and Selborne situated to the north and northwest, respectively.

The Oakhanger Stream, a tributary of the River Wey, originates at Shortheath Common and flows southward, eventually passing near Blackmoor on its way to Selborne. The stream has an overall length of approximately 3.9 miles (6.3 km). Blackmoor also has a small café and gift shop, the Chocolate Frog Company, located on the outskirts of nearby Oakhanger Farm.

=== Climate ===
Due to its location in south-central England and proximity to the coast, Blackmoor experiences relatively mild and humid weather. Winds often have a southerly component, resulting in higher humidity and lower cloud bases than areas further inland. According to data from nearby Odiham, the average maximum temperature in January is 7.2 °C (45 °F), with an average minimum of 1.6 °C (35 °F). In July, the average maximum temperature is 21 °C (70 °F), with a minimum of 12.5 °C (55 °F). Annual rainfall is approximately 755 millimetres (29.7 in), with at least 1 millimetre (0.039 in) of precipitation recorded on around 103 days each year.

== Notable landmarks ==
A chapel existed at Blackmoor as early as 1254, when the vicarage of Selborne was endowed with all the small tithes belonging to the mother church and to the chapels of Oakhanger and Blackmoor. The taxation return of 1291 is also understood to have included the chapel at Blackmoor. An agreement made in 1352 between the Prior and Convent of Selborne and the vicar further confirms this, describing them as the impropriators of the parish church of Selborne along with both chapels.

By 1462, a financial assessment of the priory’s revenues and liabilities recorded expenditure on the repair of Blackmoor’s chancel. Synodals (church dues) from the chapel were noted by the Dean of Alton in 1489, amounting to 7½ pence, and were grouped with those of Oakhanger, Selborne, and East Worldham in the Valor Ecclesiasticus of 1535.

The present church, dedicated to St Matthew, stands at the northern end of the village street, near the bend in the road toward Oakhanger. It was built by the first Earl of Selborne and was consecrated on 18 May 1869. A lych gate leads into the churchyard and toward the church itself, which features a square white stone tower topped with red tiles. Inside, a white marble monument on the first pillar of the chancel commemorates Lord Selborne and his wife. The plaque was erected by the people of Blackmoor "in gratitude for all the good that under God has come to this parish through their devotion to their Saviour and their love to their fellow men."

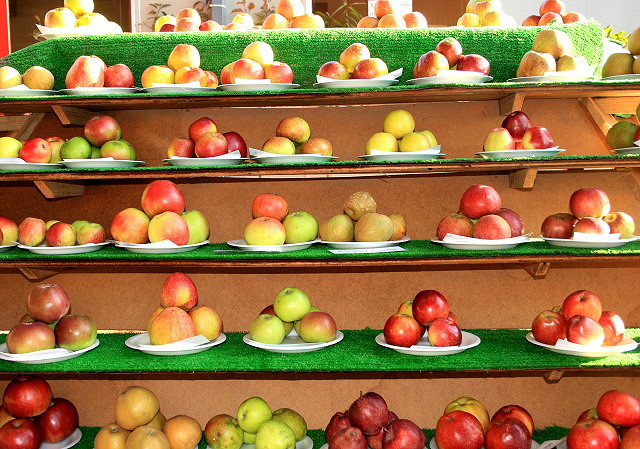
Apples at Blackmoor Fruit Nurseries

The Grade II-listed Old Thatch was built in the early 17th-century.

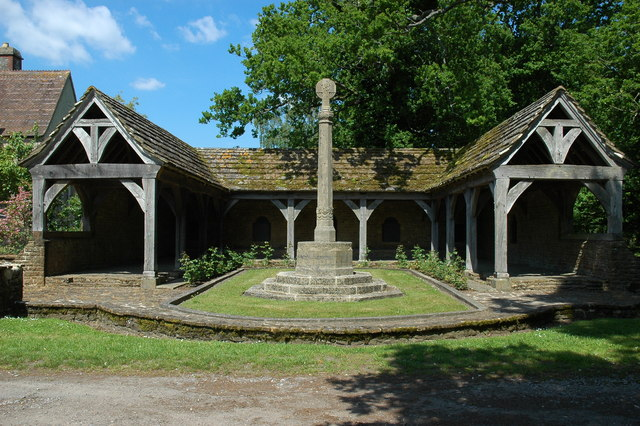
War Memorial

Designed by Herbert Baker, the Blackmoor War Memorial cloister, framed by timber, was added to the church grounds in 1920. It is one of around 130 Grade II* listed war memorials in England.

Blackmoor is home to a specialist fruit nurseries. The Blackmoor Estate, now a farming company, hosts annual apple-tasting events from the estate's groves. On 18 February 2013 two workers were killed at the farm when they entered a controlled atmosphere store with an oxygen level of 1% in order to obtain apples to enter in the Marden fruit show. In 2015 their manager was sentenced to two-and-half years in prison for manslaughter in relation to their deaths.

== Education ==
St Matthew's Church of England Primary School opened in 1962 and teaches over 150 pupils.

== See also ==
- St Matthew's Church, Blackmoor
