= Oakhanger, Hampshire =

Village and parish in Hampshire, England

Coordinates: 51.11508°N 0.90283°W

Oakhanger
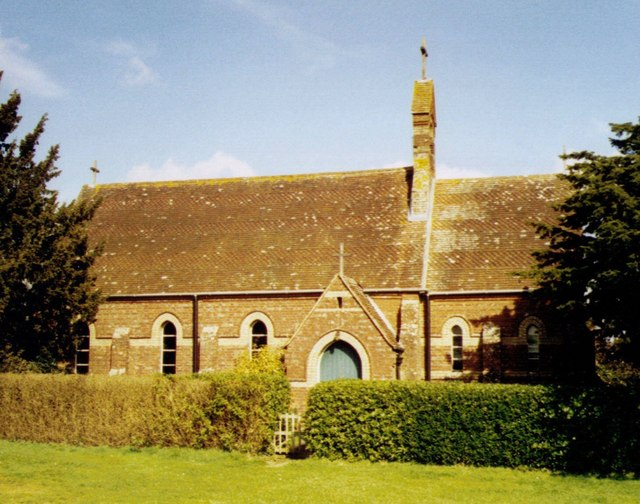
- St Mary Magdalene's in the village centre

- Location within Hampshire
- OS grid reference: SU769359
- Civil parish: Selborne
- District: East Hampshire
- Shire county: Hampshire
- Region: South East
- Country: England
- Sovereign state: United Kingdom
- Post town: BORDON
- Postcode district: GU35
- Dialling code: 01420
- Police: Hampshire and Isle of Wight
- Fire: Hampshire and Isle of Wight
- Ambulance: South Central
- UK Parliament: East Hampshire

Oakhanger is a village in the East Hampshire district of Hampshire, England. Its nearest town is Bordon, 1.7 miles (2.7 km) eastward on the B3004 road. It is part of the parish of Selborne, which covers an area of 7,915 acres (3,203 ha). The nearest railway station is Alton, 3.8 miles (6.1 km) to the northwest; the village had its own Oakhanger Halt railway station on the Longmoor Military Railway until its closure.

A Roman road passed through Oakhanger although no traces of it remain today. Its first known mention is in a charter dated to the early 10th century, and the lands passed through numerous families until the early 20th century. It contains four Grade II listed buildings, including Oakhanger Farmhouse and its three outbuildings, and one pub, The Red Lion. St Mary Magdalene's Church was built in 1873. The former Royal Air Force station, RAF Oakhanger, still retains its satellite domes, although the station is now privately run.

== History ==
A Roman road passed through the village although there are no visible signs of its existence. Both Roman and Mesolithic remains have been found in nearby Shortheath Common, including a large Roman hoard of 11,000 silver pieces. The village name has been spelled in various ways, including Acangre (10th century), Hohangra (early 12th century), Ochangra, Achangre, and Hachangre (late 12th century). Although the area has been settled since the Iron Age, the first mention of Oakhanger itself was in a charter from the early 10th century, which stated the boundaries of lands granted by Edward of Wessex to Frithestan, the Bishop of Winchester. In the reign of Edward the Confessor the lands of Oakhanger were assessed to be worth 40 shillings. At the time of the Domesday Survey in 1086, Oakhanger was held by Edwin, who had purchased it from Richard I. The identity of Edwin is unclear; during the 12th century the manor was evidently held by a family that took the surname of Oakhanger – thus William de Oakhanger was in possession of the village in 1167. In 1250 James de Oakhanger, the grandson of William de Oakhanger, was inheritated the lands of the village until ownership was passed down to his son in 1279. William who died without children in 1317, leaving his brother John Paynel as his heir. Paynel died two years later and his daughter Maud, the wife of Nicholas de Upton, inherited two parts of Oakhanger.

In 1476, Oakhanger was held by Richard West, 7th Baron De La Warr, who then died and left the lands to his son and heir Thomas West, who died in 1525 leaving it to his son, also named Thomas. The latter died without children in 1554 and the manor of Oakhanger was passed to Lady Jane Dudley, Duchess of Northumberland; although it was described as "one acre in Oakhanger held in chief for the hundredth part of a knight's fee". On her death, the lands of Oakhanger were transferred to Ambrose Dudley, 3rd Earl of Warwick. It reverted to the Crown with the rest of his property when he died without heirs in 1590. In the late 16th century, Richard Pescod was forced to sell his lease of Oakhanger Ponds to Richard Springham, a mercer of London, as he knew that Pescod was in debt. Pescod promised to lend him £100 or more for a "reasonable time", as well as a yearly rent of forty carps from the ponds. The lease lasted for around forty years until Pescod's death.

Edward Wilcox gave the manor of Oakhanger to his only daughter and heir Margaret in 1724, who seven years later, sold the lands to John Conduit. By the will of Conduit, Oakhanger was passed on to his only daughter and heir Catherine, who married Viscount Lymington in 1736. By an Act of Parliament of 1748–9 for selling the settled estates of Catherine Lymington, Oakhanger was then sold to Henry Bilson Legge. In 1750, Henry Bilson Legge married Mary, and created the title of Baroness Stawell in 1760. Their son, Henry Bilson-Legge, Lord Stawell, married the daughter of Viscount Curzon, who died without male heirs in 1820. Their only daughter Mary married John Dutton, the only son and heir of James Sherborne, from whom the manor of Oakhanger was passed by inheritance to Henry John Dutton, the last owner as of 1908.

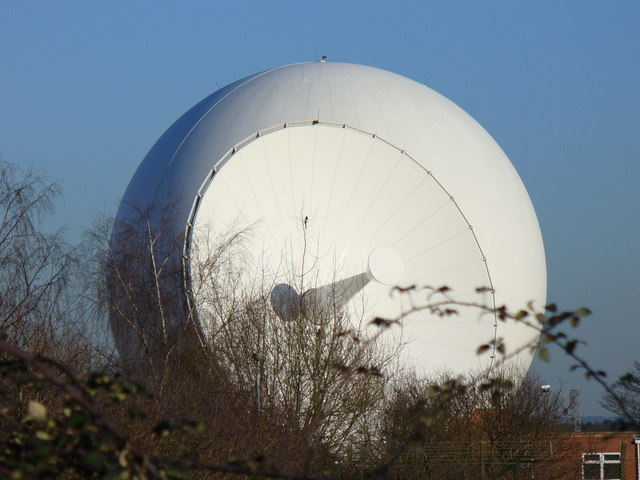
Space receiver at RAF Oakhanger.

In 1905, the War Department decided to commission the Longmoor Military Railway, which ran from the Longmoor Camp near Liphook to Bordon. It was extended south to Liss in 1933, and around this time Oakhanger Halt railway station was built as the main station for the Bordon Garrison, until the line's closure in 1969. RAF Oakhanger was built in 1954 for the use of experimental space communications, when it bounced a voice signal off the moon and received it back. The station was bought out by a private company in 2003 and is now privately run.

== Geography and demographics ==
Oakhanger is located in the eastern central part of Hampshire, in South East England, 1.7 miles (2.7 km) west of Bordon, its nearest town. The village is within the civil parish of Selborne, which covers an area of 7,915 acres (3,203 ha), of which 105 acres (42 ha) is covered by water. The landscape is dominated by farms and heathland such as Shortheath Common, Oakhanger Farm and parts of the Woolmer Forest, which surrounds Bordon. The soil is described as is a wet, sandy loam "remarkable for trees, but infamous for roads". Selborne's parish contains another village, Blackmoor, which lies to the south. The Oakhanger Stream is a tributary of the River Wey and starts at Shortheath Common where it runs down to Selborne, making the overall length approximately 3.9 miles (6.3 km). The village also has a small shop and cafe known as the Chocolate Frog Company, which is situated on the outskirts of Oakhanger Farm.

=== Climate ===
Due to its location in south central England and its proximity to the sea, Oakhanger receives winds with a southerly component, higher humidity and lower cloud bases than settlements further inland. At nearby Odiham the average maximum temperature in January is 7.2 °C (45 °F) with the average minimum being 1.6 °C (35 °F) and the average maximum temperature in July is 21 °C (70 °F), with the average minimum being 12.5 °C (55 °F). The village gets around 755 millimetres (29.7 in) of rain a year, with a minimum of 1 mm (0.04 in) of rain reported on 103 days a year.

== Notable landmarks ==
Listed buildings and landmarks in Oakhanger

The following are the listed buildings in Oakhanger. The listings are graded:

- Stable north of Oakhanger Farmhouse (II)
- Barn east of Oakhanger Farmhouse (II)
- Oakhanger Farmhouse (II)
- Stable east of Oakhanger Farmhouse(II)

Oakhanger contains four Grade II listed buildings. Oakhanger Farmhouse is a two-storey house which dates from 1811 with late 19th century extensions. It consists of walls made of Flemish bond with blue headers, flat arches, and stone cills. The farmhouse became a Grade II listed building 18 July 1986. Two stables which lie both east and north are also Grade II listed buildings: the stable to the east dates from 1814 and has yellow carstone walls, whereas the stable to the north was built in 1820 and has a hipped tiled roof. The final listed building is a barn which lies 20 metres (66 ft) east of Oakhanger Farmhouse. It dates from the 18th century and consists of timber framed walls with sections of boarding, brickwork, and ironstone. St Mary Magdalene's Church was built in 1873 by architect Moreton Glover. It is part of the Diocese of Winchester and has since never been restored nor is it a listed building. On the fifth Sunday every month the church hosts a Benefice Holy Communion.
