= Whitehill & Bordon Leisure Centre =

General information
- Type: Leisure centre
- Location: Budds Lane, Bordon, GU35 0JE, Bordon, United Kingdom
- Coordinates: 51.1122°N 0.8654°W
- Completed: 2020
- Opening: November 2020
- Owner: East Hampshire District Council
- Operator: Everyone Active

Whitehill & Bordon Leisure Centre is a public sports and leisure facility located on Budds Lane in Bordon, Hampshire, England. The facility is owned by the East Hampshire District Council and is operated by the leisure management company Everyone Active.

== History ==
The leisure centre was constructed as a flagship component of the extensive regeneration of Whitehill and Bordon, following the departure of the military from Bordon Camp.The project aimed to transform the former garrison town into a modern, green community with health and wellbeing as a central focus.

The new multi-million pound centre officially opened in November 2020, replacing the town's older Mill Chase Leisure Centre, which was subsequently closed and demolished.

== Facilities ==
The centre features modern sporting and fitness facilities, including:

- A 25-metre, six-lane main swimming pool
- A dedicated teaching pool
- An 80-station fitness suite equipped with cardiovascular and resistance machines
- Two group exercise studios for fitness classes such as yoga and pilates

Further expansion plans have been proposed to add an aquatic adventure zone, including water slides and interactive splash pads, to the existing structure.
