= Kingsley Halt railway station =

Former railway station in England

Coordinates: 51.1454°N 0.8749°W

Kingsley Halt

General information
- Location: Kingsley, East Hampshire, Hampshire; England
- Grid reference: SU788391
- Platforms: 1

Other information
- Status: Disused

History
- Pre-grouping: London and South Western Railway
- Post-grouping: Southern Railway; Southern Region of British Railways

Key dates
- 7 March 1906: Opened
- 16 September 1957: Closed to passenger traffic
- 4 April 1966: Line closed entirely
Location

Kingsley Halt was a railway station on the Bordon Light Railway which served the village of Kingsley, Hampshire, England. The station had been constructed by the London and South Western Railway (LSWR) in the hope that the area would attract residential development, but this did not happen. The LSWR had purchased an area of land far larger than that what was actually used, as they hoped to construct a large station and goods yard. A primitive halt with a single platform opened some months after the line's opening, consisting merely of a nameboard, noticeboard, lamp and seat.

Declining passenger traffic and reduced military activities at Bordon after the Second World War saw the line's closure to regular services in 1957. Kingsley Halt was demolished soon after closure, and nothing now remains except the shape of the trackbed, now used as a farm track.

Preceding station	Disused railways	Following station
Bentley	British Rail; Southern Region; Bordon Light Railway	Bordon

== See also ==
- List of closed railway stations in Britain
