= Blackmoor War Memorial =

War memorial in Blackmoor, Hampshire, England

Coordinates: 51°05′47″N 0°53′15″W

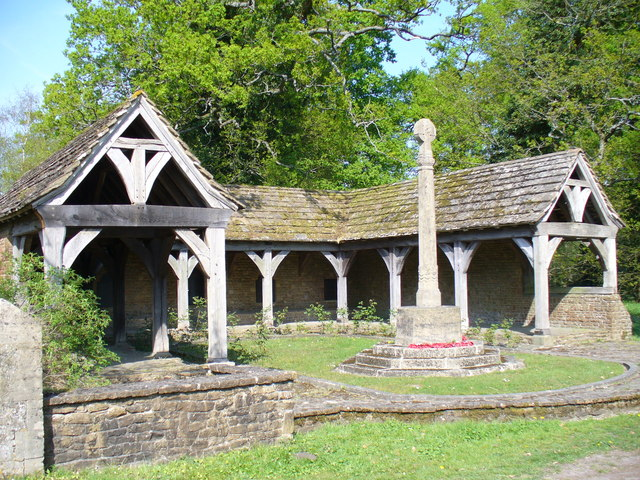
Blackmoor War Memorial, Blackmoor, Hampshire

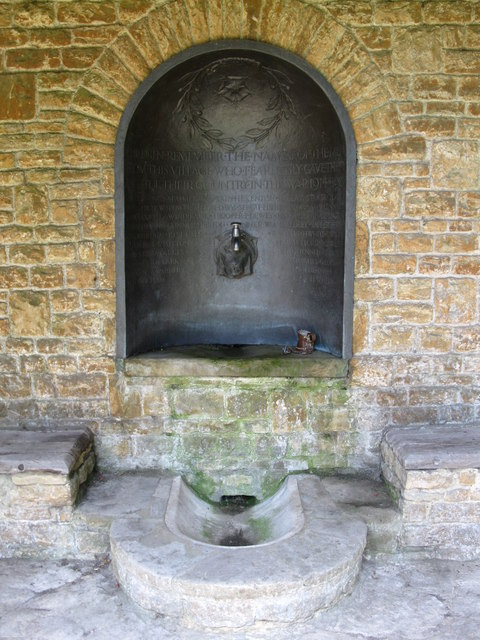
Fountain on the wall at the rear of the cloister

Blackmoor War Memorial is a First World War memorial cloister in Blackmoor, near Liss, in Hampshire. The memorial stands on the north side of the main road, with the Church of St Matthew to the east and the village school to the west. It was designed by Sir Herbert Baker, and comprises a three-sided wood-framed arcade, open to the south, arranged around lawn with a memorial cross. Several memorial plaques and a fountain by Sir Charles Wheeler are mounted on the walls of the arcade. It is one of around 130 Grade II* listed war memorials in England.

== Background ==
The memorial was commissioned by the politician William Palmer, 2nd Earl of Selborne and his wife Maud Palmer, Countess of Selborne to commemorate their second son Captain Robert Stafford Arthur Palmer, who died of wounds in January 1916 aged 27, after the Battle of Umm-el-Hanna, while attached to the 1/4th Battalion of the Hampshire Regiment in Mesopotamia during the First World War. Captain Palmer is also commemorated on the Basra Memorial.

The memorial was unveiled in 1920. The cloister and cross were designed by Sir Herbert Baker. Buoyed by the success of this design, he was later commissioned to design the Winchester College War Cloister; both Robert Palmer and Baker's sons were educated at Winchester College.

== Description ==
The three sides of the memorial cloister stand behind and to either side of lawn, upon which stands a memorial cross. The structure is open on the fourth side, to the south, with steps leading up from the road that passes by. The wood-framed arcade stands on walls of Bargate stone, and is roofed with Horsham stone. The cloister is paved with stone flags, with a bench along the rear (north) wall to either side of the fountain in a central niche on the north wall incorporates a fountain with lion's mouth spout, intended to provide drinking water to refresh the children at the village school nearby, as a deliberate attempt to bring "animation and lively activity" into a memorial to the dead.

Mounted on the walls of the cloister are six bronze memorial plaques by Sir Charles Wheeler, five on the north wall (including the fountain) and one for Robert Palmer on the east wall. To either side of the fountain are round-headed plaques, one dedicated to "War" and one to "Peace", decorated with symbolic trees, and a further plaque is addressed to the children of the village. Each includes inscriptions. Two plaques commemorate casualties of the First World War - one for Palmer, and another listing the names of 35 other war casualties from the villages nearby. Another plaque was added later, listing 8 Second World War casualties, and a further plaque with yet more names in 2009.

The wheel-headed memorial cross is a typical Baker design, with an octagonal cross section, standing on an octagonal plinth and a three-stepped octagonal base. The head of the cross is inscribed "TRULY THERE IS A GOD THAT JUDGETH THE EARTH", a biblical quotation from the end of Psalm 58. Baker had proposed a similar design of memorial cross to the Imperial War Graves Commission (now Commonwealth War Graves Commission), but the Commission selected a different design by Sir Reginald Blomfield: the Cross of Sacrifice familiar at many CWGC cemeteries. The cross stands on a lawn in the centre of the cloister, surrounded by a paved path.

Nearby are the Grade II listed village school and school house, and the Grade II* listed Church of St Matthew. A stone memorial tablet in the church lists 19 names of war dead from the First World War, and a separate wooden board records 8 from the Second World War. The church also houses a carved wooden memorial plaque to Captain Palmer.

== Recent history ==
The memorial was restored and the fountain repaired in 2005, funded by the War Memorials Trust. The Trust funded further work in 2009 to add a new plaque listing the names of casualties from the First and Second World Wars that had been omitted from the earlier plaques. The restored memorial was rededicated in June 2010.

Blackmoor War Memorial was listed at Grade II in 1986. It was upgraded to Grade II* in May 2017, when it was one of 15 memorials by Baker to be listed or upgraded as part of a newly designated "national collection". Others to be included in the collection include the Winchester College War Cloister (upgraded to Grade I); three newly listed at Grade II* (the County of Kent War Memorial Cross in Canterbury, the Hampshire and Isle of Wight War Memorial in Winchester, and the Hatfield War Memorial); three upgraded from Grade II to Grade II* (in addition to Blackmoor, the others were at Overbury and Harrow School), and eight other memorials newly listed at Grade II (the war memorials at Ascot, Chicheley, Etchingham, Kemerton, King's School, Canterbury, Potterne, Richmond, and Rochester.) Other listed war memorials by Baker include those at Thorney Hill, Hertingfordbury, Ramsgate, Wadhurst, Tewin, Haileybury College, and Cobham.

== See also ==
- Grade II* listed war memorials in England
