= Oakmoor School =

Location
- Budds Lane; Bordon, Hampshire, GU35 0JB; England; 51.118°N 0.868°W

Information
- Type: Academy
- Department for Education URN: 140182 Tables
- Ofsted: Reports
- Headteacher: Nigel Wright
- Assistant headteacher: Callie Evans - Safeguarding Lead Rob Riley - Student Engagement Adam Beere - Curriculum
- Staff: 105
- Gender: Coeducational
- Age: 11 to 16
- Enrolment: 882
- Website: https://www.oakmoor.chimat.uk/page/?title=Oakmoor+School+Maps&pid=224

Oakmoor School is a coeducational secondary school in Bordon, Hampshire, England. The school serves students aged 11 to 16 from Bordon, Whitehill, and the surrounding area. The school operates as an academy and occupies a purpose-built campus on Budds Lane, which opened in 2019 as part of the regeneration of Whitehill and Bordon. It is based on a purpose-built campus designed to support a broad range of academic and extracurricular activities.

It was founded in 1958 as Mill Chase County Secondary School. In 2007 the school gained specialist technology College status and was renamed Mill Chase Community Technology College. The school converted to academy status in November 2013 and was renamed Chase Hill Academy. Due to population growth in Bordon, the school relocated to a new campus on Budds Lane in November 2019 and was renamed Oakmoor School.

Today, Oakmoor School is sponsored by the University of Chichester Multi Academy Trust, and offers GCSEs and BTECs as programmes of study for pupils.

Oakmoor School shares a road with Bordon Juniors primary school.

== History ==
Oakmoor School was established following the closure and redevelopment of Mill Chase Community School, which had previously served the Bordon and Whitehill area for 61 years. Mill Chase originally opened on 18 March 1959 as Mill Chase Secondary School and was built to serve the growing local population at the time. Over the years the school expanded its facilities and later became known as Mill Chase Community School, and then Mill Chase Community Technology College.

In the early 2010s, changes to education in the area and declining student numbers led to plans to replace the school. Mill Chase Community School closed on 31 October 2013 and reopened on 1 November 2013 as an academy under a new name, Chase Hill Academy, as part of a wider reorganisation of local secondary education.

Due to continued growth of housing estates in the local area, especially in Bordon, a new school building was planned to replace the older Mill Chase site. In November 2019, the school moved to a newly built campus on Budds Lane and was renamed Oakmoor School. The new site was designed as a modern educational campus, consisting of multiple buildings surrounding a large central courtyard and providing improved facilities for teaching and learning.

Since being rehoused on Budds Lane, Oakmoor School has continued to operate as a coeducational secondary school for students aged 11 to 16. It is part of the University of Chichester Academy Trust and provides a range of subjects and qualifications for students in the local area, continuing the role previously held by Mill Chase Community School.

== Governance ==
Oakmoor School is a member of the University of Chichester Academy Trust, a multi-academy trust responsible for a number of primary and secondary schools across Hampshire, West Sussex and Portsmouth. The trust was established to provide educational oversight, school improvement support and strategic leadership across its academies while allowing individual schools to retain their own identities and local characteristics.

The school joined the trust following its conversion to academy status in November 2013, when Mill Chase Community School closed and reopened as Chase Hill Academy. Since then, governance has been provided through a combination of trust-wide leadership and local governance arrangements. The trust is responsible for matters including finance, estates management, safeguarding oversight and long-term educational strategy, while school leaders are responsible for the day-to-day operation of the academy.

The headteacher of Oakmoor School is Nigel Wright, who has overseen the school's development during a period of significant change, including its relocation to the new Budds Lane campus. Under the leadership of the trust and school management team, Oakmoor has continued to expand in response to rising pupil numbers and the ongoing development of Whitehill and Bordon.

== Admissions ==
Admissions are coordinated through Hampshire County Council in accordance with the school's published admissions arrangements. The school primarily serves pupils transferring from local primary schools, including those located within Whitehill and Bordon, although applications may also be accepted from outside the immediate catchment area where places are available.

The school has experienced increasing demand for places since relocating to its purpose-built campus in 2019, reflecting both population growth and residential development associated with the wider regeneration of Whitehill and Bordon. To accommodate this growth, the school has expanded its capacity and introduced additional teaching accommodation. The school's Published Admission Number (PAN) is reviewed periodically in response to demographic changes and projected pupil numbers within the local area.

As a non-selective academy, Oakmoor School admits pupils without academic selection. Where applications exceed the number of places available, admissions are determined according to the oversubscription criteria published by the school and Hampshire County Council. These criteria include considerations such as looked-after children, medical and social needs, sibling links and distance from the school.

== Curriculum ==
Oakmoor School offers a broad curriculum for students aged 11 to 16, covering a range of core and foundation subjects. Core subjects include English, mathematics and science, which are studied throughout the school and form the national basis for core subjects. Science is typically split into the three disciplines of Biology, Chemistry and Physics as students progress through the school.

Alongside the core subjects, students study a variety of humanities subjects including Geography, History and Religious Education. The curriculum also includes a range of creative and useful subjects such as Art, Photography, Design Technology, Drama, Dance and Music, allowing students to develop skills in both academic and artistic areas.

Students also take part in subjects such as Computing, Food and Nutrition and Modern Foreign Languages. These subjects aim to provide a wider understanding of technology, culture and everyday life skills. Physical Education is also a documented part of the curriculum and is studied by students across all year groups.

At Key Stage 4, students begin to specialise by choosing option subjects alongside the core curriculum. These subjects are studied alongside English, Mathematics and Science, with students working towards qualifications such as GCSEs and, in some cases, vocational courses. The curriculum is designed to provide a balanced education, giving students the opportunity to achieve academically while also developing useful, creative and personal skills.

== Academic performance ==
Oakmoor School prepares pupils for qualifications including GCSEs and vocational courses at Key Stage 4. In 2025, the school recorded its strongest GCSE results since opening, with the proportion of pupils achieving higher grades increasing across a number of subjects.

The school reported that the percentage of pupils achieving grades 5–9 and grades 7–9 across all subjects was the highest in its history.

== Ofsted inspections ==
According to the most recent 2026 Ofsted inspection, the school was praised for its attendance, behaviour and support for pupils. The report found that the school's curriculum was well structured and accurately delivered. It also stated that the school provides appropriate support for pupils with disabilities and additional needs.

The inspection reported that staff act in the best interests of pupils and contribute positively to the school's learning environment. Ofsted also noted that many pupils feel safe at school and understand the importance of respect and kindness within the school community.

However, the report stated that pupils were not achieving as well as they should academically. Despite this, Ofsted recognised that the school was taking steps to improve outcomes and support pupils in reaching national expectations. The report also highlighted the support available for students with additional educational needs.

== Campus ==
=== Architecture ===
Oakmoor School occupies a purpose-built campus on Budds Lane in Bordon, Hampshire. The school relocated to the site in November 2019 following the closure of the former Mill Chase campus. The development formed part of the wider regeneration programme for Whitehill and Bordon and represented a significant investment in educational infrastructure within the town. Constructed at a cost of approximately £23 million, the campus was designed to provide modern teaching facilities capable of supporting a growing pupil population.

The campus consists of several interconnected buildings arranged around a large central courtyard. The buildings are primarily constructed from brick, steel and glass, with the design intended to create clear routes between teaching areas while maximising natural light throughout the site. Architectural publications have noted the school's use of durable materials and its integration into the surrounding landscape.

=== Facilities ===
The campus contains a range of specialist teaching facilities, including science laboratories, design technology workshops, computing suites, art studios and dedicated spaces for music, drama and dance. The school also includes a theatre used for assemblies, performances and community events.

Sporting facilities include a sports hall, changing facilities, outdoor courts and playing fields. Additional facilities include a cafeteria, medical room, student support areas and administrative offices. The campus was designed to provide both indoor and outdoor learning environments and includes landscaped areas surrounding the central courtyard.

=== Expansion ===
The school was designed to accommodate the increasing demand for secondary school places generated by residential development within Whitehill and Bordon. Following continued growth in pupil numbers after the opening of the new campus, additional teaching accommodation was introduced during the 2020s to increase classroom capacity.

In 2024 a temporary teaching block was installed on the campus to provide additional classroom space. Further expansion has been considered as part of ongoing planning for future population growth in the local area.
