= BASE Bordon Inovation Centre =

British co-working building

BASE Bordon Innovation Centre
- Former names: Broxhead House, Officers' Mess of Louisburg Barracks
- Alternative names: The BASE

General information
- Type: Business incubator and co-working space
- Location: Broxhead House, 60 Barbados Road, Bordon, GU35 0FX, Bordon, United Kingdom
- Coordinates: 51.1238774°N 0.8610420°W
- Opening: 2017; 9 years ago (as innovation centre)
- Operator: Oxford Innovation Space

BASE Bordon Innovation Centre, often referred to simply as The BASE, is co-working space located in Bordon, Hampshire, United Kingdom.

The facility is managed by a local business, Oxford Innovation Space, and it provides flexible office space and is tailored towards freelancers and startups.

== History ==
The town of Bordon had a military presence from 1863-2015, when the Ministry of Defence withdrew the garrison. The BASE is housed in Broxhead House, which originally served as the Officers' Mess for the Louisburg Barracks.

After the military departed the area,

Following the departure of the military, the local area became part of a regeneration project and was designated as an Enterprise Zone. One of the early initiatives of this project was to create jobs to replace those lost by the garrison's closure.

== Facilities and services ==
The BASE offers private offices, co-working desks, and high-speed WiFi. Users of the centre can also access mentoring services.
