= Bordon railway station =

Disused railway station in Bordon, East Hampshire

Coordinates: 51.12063°N 0.88120°W

Bordon

General information
- Location: Bordon, East Hampshire; England
- Grid reference: SU784363
- Platforms: 3 (one Longmoor M. Rly platform)

Other information
- Status: Disused

History
- Pre-grouping: London and South Western Railway
- Post-grouping: Southern Railway; Southern Region of British Railways

Key dates
- 11 December 1905: Opened
- 16 September 1957: Closed to passenger traffic
- 4 April 1966: Closed to freight traffic
Location

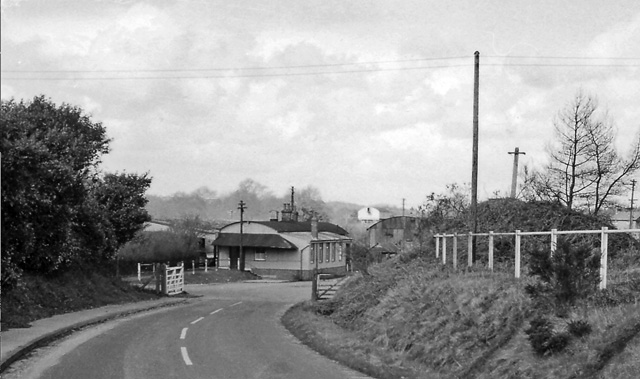
Bordon station approach in 1963

Bordon is a former railway station on the Bordon Light Railway which served the town of Bordon, Hampshire, England and its nearby army camp.

== History ==
The station building was constructed of corrugated iron on steel framing and stood on a short brick wall. Extra traffic during the First World War led to the extension of the station and the addition of a wooden canopy on its platform side. The station also had a small engine shed which was used in the line's early days for overnight stabling of engines. The shed was later to be damaged by an engine running through its rear, and it was left afterwards to become derelict. Eleven railway cottages were constructed by the London and South Western Railway near the station to accommodate staff: all were either semi-detached or terraced except no. 8 which was the stationmaster's residence. A small wooden signalbox located at the approach of the station completed the layout.

It was possible to change at Bordon for services on the Longmoor Military Railway towards Liss, although a physical connection to the main Waterloo-Portsmouth line there was not established until 1942.

== Closure ==
Decreasing use saw the up platform become overgrown in the 1930s, resulting in it being cut back to half its original length. Nevertheless, it still saw very little use and by the late 1950s was very overgrown. Following the closure of the line in 1966, the station buildings were demolished and the land was sold for commercial use. The "Bordon Trading Estate" now stands on the site.

The Association of Train Operating Companies have applied for funding for the reopening of this station, following the publication of its report Connecting Communities: Expanding Access to the Rail Network.

== Services ==
South Western Railway run a coach frequently to Farnham railway station to connect with trains. These formerly ran to Liphook but were amended to run to Farnham by South West Trains, due to the shorter journey time to London Waterloo.

Preceding station	National Rail	Following station
Terminus	South Western Railway; Bordon SWR Coach Link (Bus)	Farnham
	Disused railways	
Terminus	South West Trains; Bordon SWR Coach Link (Bus)	Liphook
Kingsley Halt	British Rail; Southern Region; Bordon Light Railway	Terminus
Terminus	Longmoor Military Railway	Oakhanger Halt

== See also ==
- List of closed railway stations in Britain
