= Kingsley Common =

Protected area in Hampshire, England

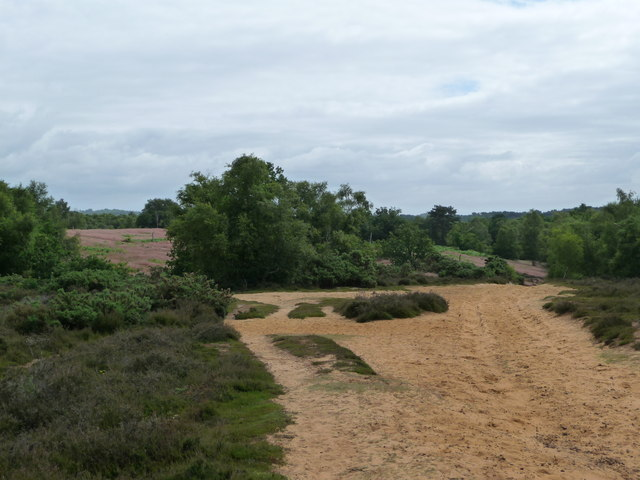

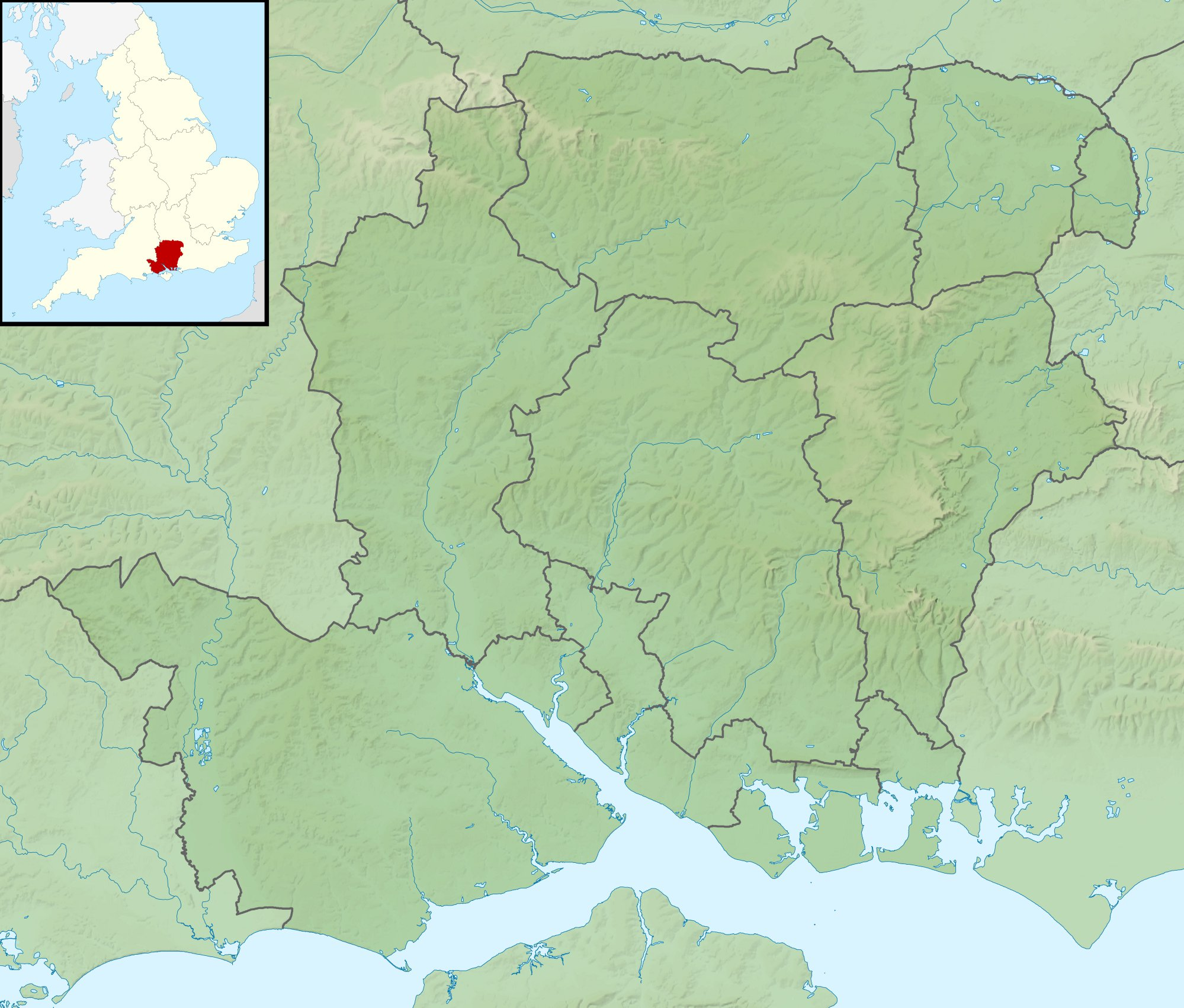
- Location within Hampshire
- Location: Kingsley, Hampshire, England
- Coordinates: 51°08′14″N 0°52′08″W
- Area: 41 ha (100 acres)

Kingsley Common is a 41-hectare (100-acre) protected area in Kingsley, Hampshire, England. The site holds many rare species of animals and birds. Some species of plants and animals may also be subject to special protection under Part I of the Wildlife and Countryside Act 1981, or under the Habitats Regulations 1994. The land is owned by the Ministry of Defence.

== Protected status ==
Protection status National Partial International Partial IBA partly or wholly overlaps with the following national designated areas. Sites of Special Scientific Interest: Kingsley and Broxhead Common. There are 21 commons that still support substantial Dry dwarf shrub heath communities. This habitat covers 292 hectares (720 acres) – 7.5% of the surveyed area. Notable examples of commons with dry heaths are Yateley Common and Kingsley Common.

== The commons ==
Broxhead and Kingsley Commons are situated on the coarse sandy soils of the Folkestone Formation on the western edge of the Weald. The dry heathland vegetation is dominated by common ling and bell heather, with dwarf gorse and wavy hair-grass, although on parts of Kingsley Common the dwarf gorse and bell heather are replaced by sheep's fescue and a ground cover of terrestrial lichens. Elsewhere, acid grassland is dominated by common bent grass associated with small herbs, mosses and lichens. There are at least 25 species of lichen on the common, and the presence of several species of Cladonia indicates the high quality of this ancient heathland. In a few poorly-drained hollows, wet heath has developed with cross-leaved heath and purple moor-grass, heath rush and the sundews, round-leaved sundew and oblong-leaved sundew. Sphagnum compactum grows here, as does the nationally rare moss Hypnum imponens.

Yately Common, and Kingsley Common include several priority bird species such as European nightjar, Dartford warbler, woodlark and song thrush. Chilbolton Common supports important numbers of breeding common redshank, northern lapwings, common snipe and warblers. The nationally rare sand lizard occurs here, and there is a wide range of invertebrates associated with the warm sandy habitat, including the parasitic ant Sifolinia karavajeva, and the grayling and the silver-studded blue butterflies.
