= Oakhanger Halt railway station =

Served Bordon Camp in Hampshire, England, between 1932 and 1969

Oakhanger Halt

General information
- Location: East Hampshire; England
- Coordinates: 51.1188°N 0.8749°W
- Platforms: 1

Other information
- Status: Disused

History
- Original company: Longmoor Military Railway

Key dates
- by 1914: station opened
- 31 October 1969: closed
Location

Oakhanger Halt is a former railway station, on the Longmoor Military Railway which served Bordon Camp, the station was closer to the camp than Bordon on the Bordon Light Railway. The station is likely to have opened with the line in 1905 but the first documented evidence showing it open is on 14 August 1914 when it was used the Officer Commanding Railway Troops to say goodbye to the first mobilised Railway Company departing for France.

The station was situated immediately to the north of the ungated level crossing over Oakenhanger Road. The line through the halt was built as a single track, was doubled during WWII and singled after the war as doubled ungated level crossings were then no longer permitted. The station had one platform, with no facilities, to the west of the running lines. There was a block post, the Army's name for a signal box, between the road and the start of the platform.

At the opposite end of the platform there was a junction with lines going Louisburg Barracks and a set of sidings.

The station was closed along with the rest of the line on 31 October 1969.

Preceding station	Disused railways	Following station
Bordon	Longmoor Military Railway	Whitehill Junction
