= St Matthew's Church, Blackmoor =

Coordinates: 51.0961°N 0.8868°W

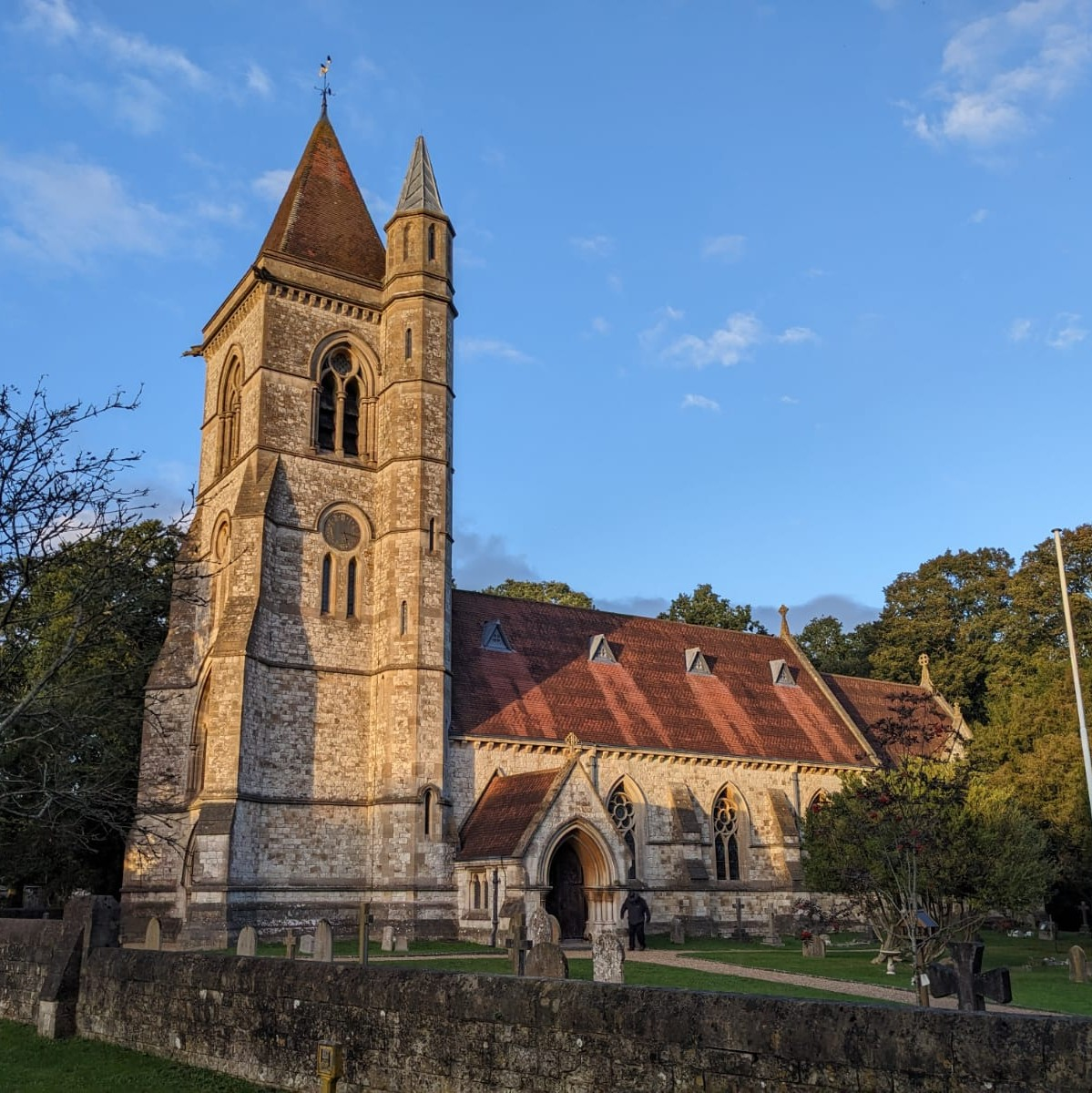

- Location within Hampshire
- OS grid reference: SU 78050 33563
- Location: Blackmoor, Hampshire
- Country: England
- Denomination: Anglican

History
- Status: Parish church
- Dedication: St Matthew
- Consecrated: 18 May 1869

Architecture
- Functional status: Active
- Heritage designation: Listed building – Grade II*
- Architect: Alfred Waterhouse
- Style: Gothic Revival
- Construction cost: £10,749.10s.11d

Specifications
- Materials: Stone, flint

Administration
- Province: Canterbury
- Diocese: Portsmouth

Clergy
- Bishop: Bishop of Portsmouth
- Vicar: Revd Amanda Sim

St Matthew's Church is an Anglican parish church in the village of Blackmoor, Hampshire, England. It is a Grade II* listed building. The church was designed by Alfred Waterhouse for Roundell Palmer, later 1st Earl of Selborne (1882).

== History ==
=== Background ===
The earliest record of a chapel in Blackmoor comes from a tithe return of 1254, which states that the parish of Selborne was owed returns from chapels in both Blackmoor and neighbouring Oakhanger. In 1291, a tax return for the ecclesia de Seleburne cum capella covered the Blackmoor chapel, and the prior and convent of Selborne were said to be "the impropriators of the parish church of Seleborne with the chapels of Oakhanger and Blakemere [sic]" in a 1352 vicarial portion. A century later, repairs to the Blackmoor chapel were paid for by the prior and convent of Selborne in 1462.

=== 19th-century church ===
Sir Roundell Palmer bought the manor of Blackmoor in 1865 and moved there in 1866. At the time there was a chapel of ease in the village, presumably the one mentioned in the Background section above, but the Palmer family would attend Sunday service at St Mary's in Selborne and evensong at the Old Church in Greatham. Following consultation with the pastor at St Mary's, Selborne, Palmer decided to build a new church in the village, as well as a vicarage, cottages and schools, choosing Alfred Waterhouse as architect.

The church is built from pale grey malm stone from a local quarry, with fine-grained Bath stone for the dressings and quoins.

A plaque on a white marble pillar on the north side of the chancel was dedicated by the village to Palmer and his wife, and reads: "In gratitude for all the good that under God has come to this parish through their devotion to their Saviour and their love to their fellow men."

== Gallery ==
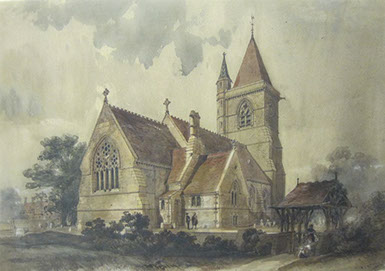
Watercolour by Alfred Waterhouse, 1870
