= Kingsley, Hampshire =

Village and parish in Hampshire, England

Coordinates: 51.13805°N 0.87427°W

Kingsley
- Village
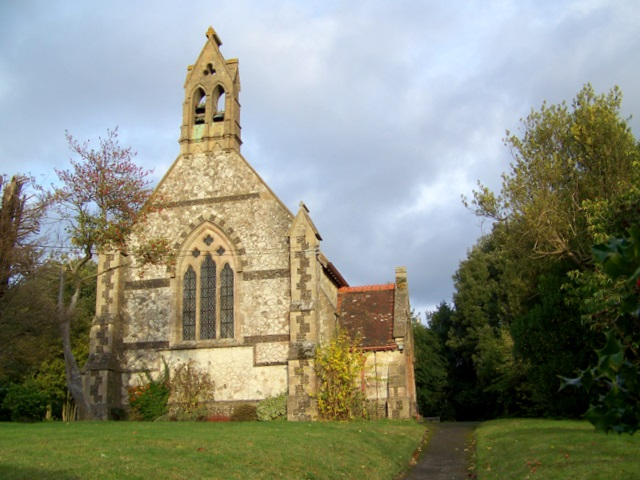
- Parish church of All Saints

- Location within Hampshire
- OS grid reference: SU788382
- Civil parish: Kingsley
- District: East Hampshire
- Shire county: Hampshire
- Region: South East
- Country: England
- Sovereign state: United Kingdom
- Post town: Bordon
- Postcode district: GU35
- Police: Hampshire and Isle of Wight
- Fire: Hampshire and Isle of Wight
- Ambulance: South Central
- UK Parliament: East Hampshire

Kingsley is a village in the East Hampshire district of Hampshire, England. It is 2.1 miles (3.4 km) north of Bordon, on the B3004 road. The village has a community centre and an inn, the Cricketers. The Victorian parish church of All Saints Is a Grade II listed building.

The nearest main railway station is Alton, 4.2 miles (6.7 km) west of the village, although Bentley station is within a similar distance to the north. The village was formerly served by Kingsley Halt on the Bentley to Bordon branch line.

The parish includes Kingsley Common.
