= Whitehill, Hampshire =

Village and parish in Hampshire, England

Coordinates: 51.10181°N 0.86908°W

Whitehill
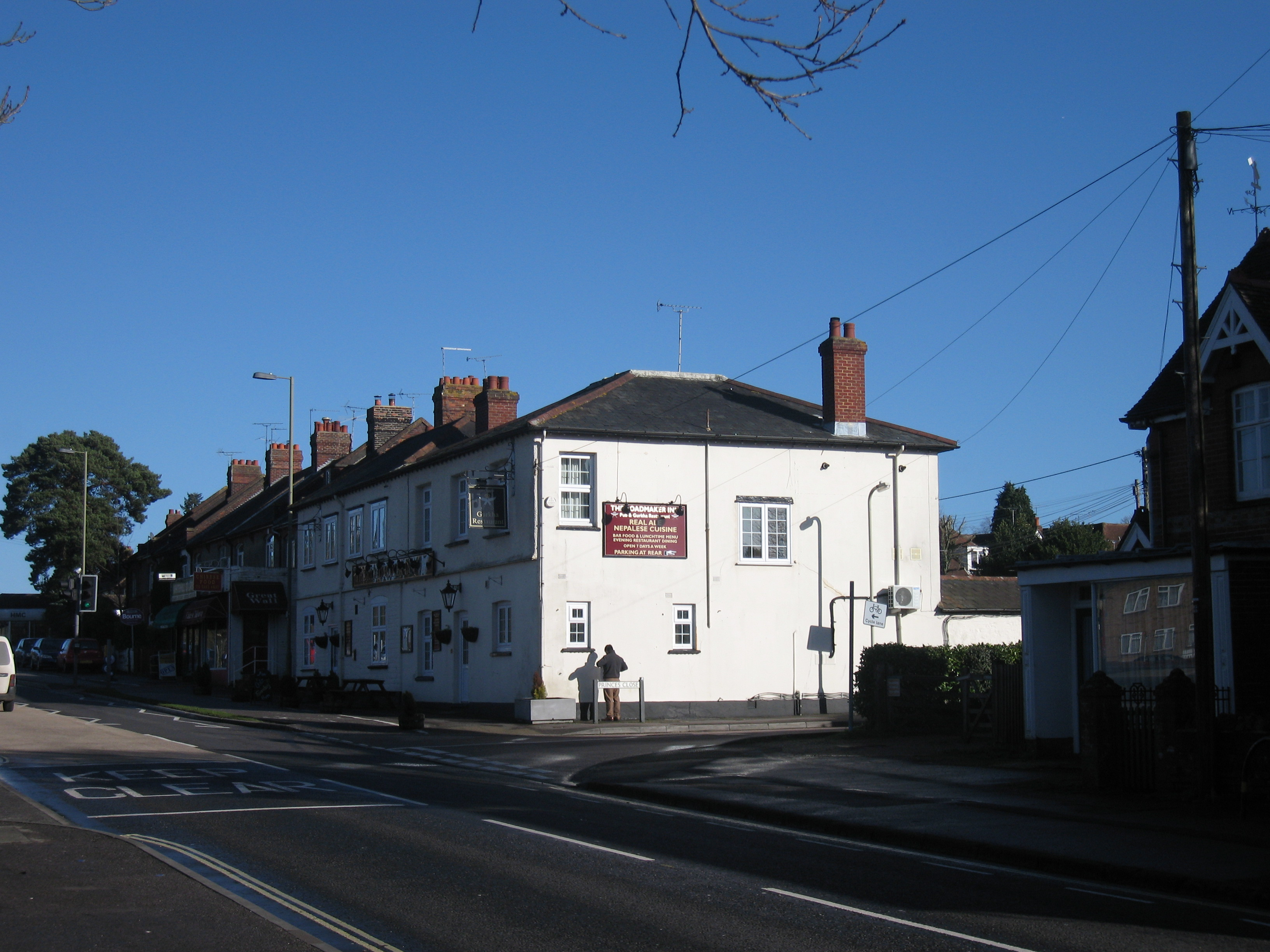
- The Roadmaker, Whitehill

- Location within Hampshire
- Population: 13,259 (2011 Census including Bordon, Hollywater and Sleaford)
- OS grid reference: SU792342
- Civil parish: Whitehill
- District: East Hampshire
- Shire county: Hampshire
- Region: South East
- Country: England
- Sovereign state: United Kingdom
- Post town: BORDON
- Postcode district: GU35
- Dialling code: 01420
- Police: Hampshire and Isle of Wight
- Fire: Hampshire and Isle of Wight
- Ambulance: South Central
- UK Parliament: East Hampshire

Whitehill is a village and civil parish in the East Hampshire district of Hampshire, England, on the historic route (now the A325) between Petersfield and Farnham. It is 0.7 miles (1.1 km) south of Bordon and covers an area of approximately 8 square miles.

The nearest railway station is Liss, 4 miles (6.4 km) south of the village.

For more information on Whitehill-Bordon and the eco-town proposal, see Bordon.

== History ==
Lying on the main road between Petersfield and Farnham, now the A325, there had been a hostelry, the Prince of Wales, at what was to become Whitehill. With the development of Bordon Camp and Longmoor Military Camp between 1899 and 1903, Whitehill, lying between the two, began to develop. Whitehill became a civil parish in 1928, having formerly been part of the parishes of Headley and Selborne. By 1931, the population of the civil parish was 4,661 in 631 households. In 1932 a police station and court house were built, but courts were later held at Alton. The parish council changed its name to Whitehill Town Council in 1991. Its area is approximately 8 square miles.

== Transport ==
Both Bordon and Whitehill straddle the very busy A325 road and the A3 road London to Portsmouth road passes through the parish (though not the village itself). The completion of the Hindhead Tunnel in July 2011 has improved road access to London, while also removing through-traffic taking the A325 through Bordon to avoid frequent delays at traffic lights in Hindhead; including some Guildford and M25-bound traffic from the south diverting via Farnham.

The nearest railway station is 4 miles (6.4 km) southeast of the town, at Liss. The town used to have its own railway station on the Longmoor Military Railway but this closed in 1969. The Rail Delivery Group has proposed that a new railway line serve the town.

There was a bus link to Liphook railway station which was discontinued in May 2009. Stagecoach South bus 18 passes through the town on the way from Haslemere to Farnham and Aldershot. Stagecoach bus 13 passes through as it travels between Liphook and Alton.
