= Woolmer Forest =

Forest in Hampshire and West Sussex, England

Coordinates: 51.079°N 0.857°W

- Site of Special Scientific Interest
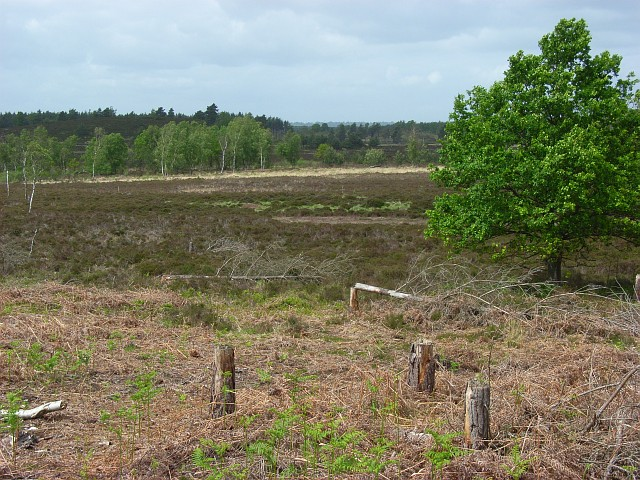
- Location of Woolmer Forest.
- Area of search: Hampshire; West Sussex
- Grid reference: SU 802 317
- Interest: Biological
- Area: 1,298.5 hectares (3,209 acres)
- Notification date: 1994
- Location map: Magic Map

Woolmer Forest is a 1,298.5-hectare (3,209-acre) biological Site of Special Scientific Interest south of Bordon in Hampshire and West Sussex. It is also a Special Area of Conservation and part of the Wealden Heaths Phase II Special Protection Area. Two areas are Nature Conservation Review sites, Grade I.

It is part of the former royal hunting forest of Woolmer. It lies within the western Weald in the South Downs National Park, straddling the border between east Hampshire and West Sussex. Historically a largely treeless heathland on sterile sandy soils, the forest was traditionally managed, like other royal forests, as "wood pasture" in which deer would be kept for hunting by the aristocracy for sport and for venison, and where commoners were permitted to graze their livestock. The forest today consists of both dry and humid lowland heath. It contains the largest and most diverse area of lowland heathland habitats outside the New Forest and is considered to be the most important area of heathland in the Weald of southern England; it is the only site in England known to support all twelve known native species of reptiles and amphibians, and it supports a nationally important heathland flora with associated birds and invertebrate fauna.

Woolmer village lies within the confines of the forest.

== Geology and ecology ==
Woolmer Forest straddles two upland watersheds, that of the River Wey and that of the River Rother. In its sandy soil, streams have cut wide valleys into the gently undulating terrain. On upland sites, dry heath predominates, characterised by heather Calluna vulgaris and bell heather Erica cinerea. The driest sandy patches support some well-adapted (xeric) uncommon plants. Humid heath, which requires less free-draining subsoils, is characterized by cross-leaved heath Erica tetralix and purple moor-grass Molinia caerulea, which are joined in the wettest valley bottoms by sphagnum moss and carnivorous sundews. These moisture-retaining habitats grade into complex acidic boggy wetlands of hummocks and pools, locally called "mires". Here are the largest populations in England of the trailing bog cranberry Vaccinium oxycoccos.

Centuries of forest management have shaped the surrounding belts of woodland, composed notably of beech Fagus sylvatica and pedunculate oak Quercus robur. Repeated pollarding has shaped the growth patterns of centuries-old trees. The discontinuous canopy favours a diverse understory, dominated by holly Ilex aquifolium, whitebeam Sorbus aria and rowan S. aucuparia with birches.

The absence of chemicals in the environment is one aspect that has encouraged an unusual diversity of insects and other invertebrates.

The landscape of Woolmer Forest has been classified by the South Downs National Park Authority, in its integrated landscape character assessment of the park, as falling within the Wealden farmland and heath mosaic, namely a landscape that has developed on the sandstones of the Folkestone Beds (part of the Lower Greensand formation of the Lower Cretaceous). This geology has given rise to a well-drained, sandy lowland landscape supporting a mosaic of oak-birch woodland, conifer plantations, open sandy heaths, and rough grazed pastures. The park authority claims that Woolmer Forest is the best area of lowland heath outside the New Forest, and that it is the largest area of heathland existing on the Folkestone Beds in southern England.

== History ==
Deforestation during the local Bronze Age stripped the natural woodland that had replaced tundra following the retreat of glaciation, and on this light soil the forest cover was replaced with heath. With the settled Roman occupation, the Roman road that was constructed between Chichester and Silchester passed through Woolmer. Traces of Roman villas have been discovered at Blackmoor, Kingsley and Liss, though ordinary people continued to live in roundhouses. Kilns for a pottery industry that apparently supplied Londinium with its cookware must have continued the deforestation to fire the kilns. An extraordinary find, the Blackmoor hoard, consisted of 29,773 coins whose minting dated the hoard to ca 296 CE; in a battle in that year the troops under Emperor Constantius Chlorus defeated the army of the usurper Allectus to retake control of Britain. The hoard may have been the paychest for Allectus's troops secreted and inadvertently abandoned after their defeat.

Following the Roman withdrawal and the collapse of Romano-British culture, the first mention of the present toponym, as Wulfamere, the "wolves' pool", is a token either of reforestation of the landscape or a translation of a previous pre-Roman name.

In the eighteenth century "Wolmer" often appears in Gilbert White's The Natural History and Antiquities of Selborne (1789), as it was included with Selborne parish. White noted that its soil consisted of sand covered with heath and fern, "without having one standing tree in the whole extent." Its bogs had formerly abounded with "subterranean trees", both blackened bog wood, used locally in house construction. In White's day the formerly plentiful Black Grouse were locally extinct, and the red deer, of which the poaching had occasioned the severities of the Black Act, had been rounded up and carted to Windsor.

Only a "narrow range of enclosures" in Gilbert White's day separated the Royal Forest of "Wolmer" from Alice Holt Forest, situated on a loamy soil that – in stark contrast to Woolmer – produced dense stands of oak, and indeed during the late medieval period the two forests were jointly administered.

In 1897 the Guildford Natural History Society presented a petition to the Commissioner of Woods and Forests, to effect "that Wolmer Forest may be reserved as a sanctuary for wild birds." This petition was the result of a lecture by Mr. T. Whitburn, the then president of the Society on Wolmer Forest. The petition asked that the nests and eggs of the birds "may remain unmolested throughout the year; that it may not be let at any time for game preserving, or for any purpose inimical to bird life; and that it may remain in perpetuity as a national memorial to the greatest outdoor naturalist England has produced–Gilbert White, of Selborne."

== Statutory designations ==
The Woolmer Forest Site of Special Scientific Interest (SSSI) was first notified, in respect of Woolmer Forest itself, in 1971; Conford Moor in the east was notified in 1959, and Blackmoor in the west in 1979. These areas were later renotified under the Wildlife and Countryside Act 1981 in 1986, 1984 and 1985 respectively. The SSSI covers 1,293.93 hectares (3,197.4 acres). The SSSI citation notes that Woolmer Forest contains the largest and most diverse area of lowland heathland in Hampshire, outside the New Forest, and that it is considered to be the most important area of heathland in the Weald of southern England.

The Woolmer Forest Special Area of Conservation (SAC) was designated in April 2005 and covers 666.68 hectares (1,647.4 acres). Its main habitats are heath (62%), coniferous woodland (22%) and dry grassland (10%). Its most important features are the dystrophic areas of open water, in particular Cranmer Pond, a shallow 8 hectares (20 acres) pool thought to have been created by peat cutting, and Woolmer Pond; and large extents of European dry heaths. In both cases the area is considered one of the best in the UK. In addition, the SAC supports a significant presence of North Atlantic wet heaths with Erica Tetralix, and transition mires and quaking bogs.

In relation to its dry heaths, Woolmer Forest is the only site in Britain that supports all six native reptiles (including the sand lizard Lacerta agilis and smooth snake Coronella austriaca) and all six native amphibians (including the great crested newt Triturus cristatus). It also supports an outstanding invertebrate fauna and bird assemblage, including European nightjar Caprimulgus europaeus, wood lark Lullula arborea, Dartford warbler Sylvia undata, Eurasian hobby Falco subbuteo, hen harrier Circus cyaneus and merlin Falco columbarius.

Woolmer Forest is also protected by the Wealden Heaths Phase 2 Special Protection Area, covering 2,053.83 hectares (5,075.1 acres), which was designated in March 1993 because of the presence of the rare heathland bird populations noted above such as Dartford warbler and European nightjar.
