= Bentley railway station (Hampshire) =

Railway station in Hampshire, England

Bentley (Hampshire)
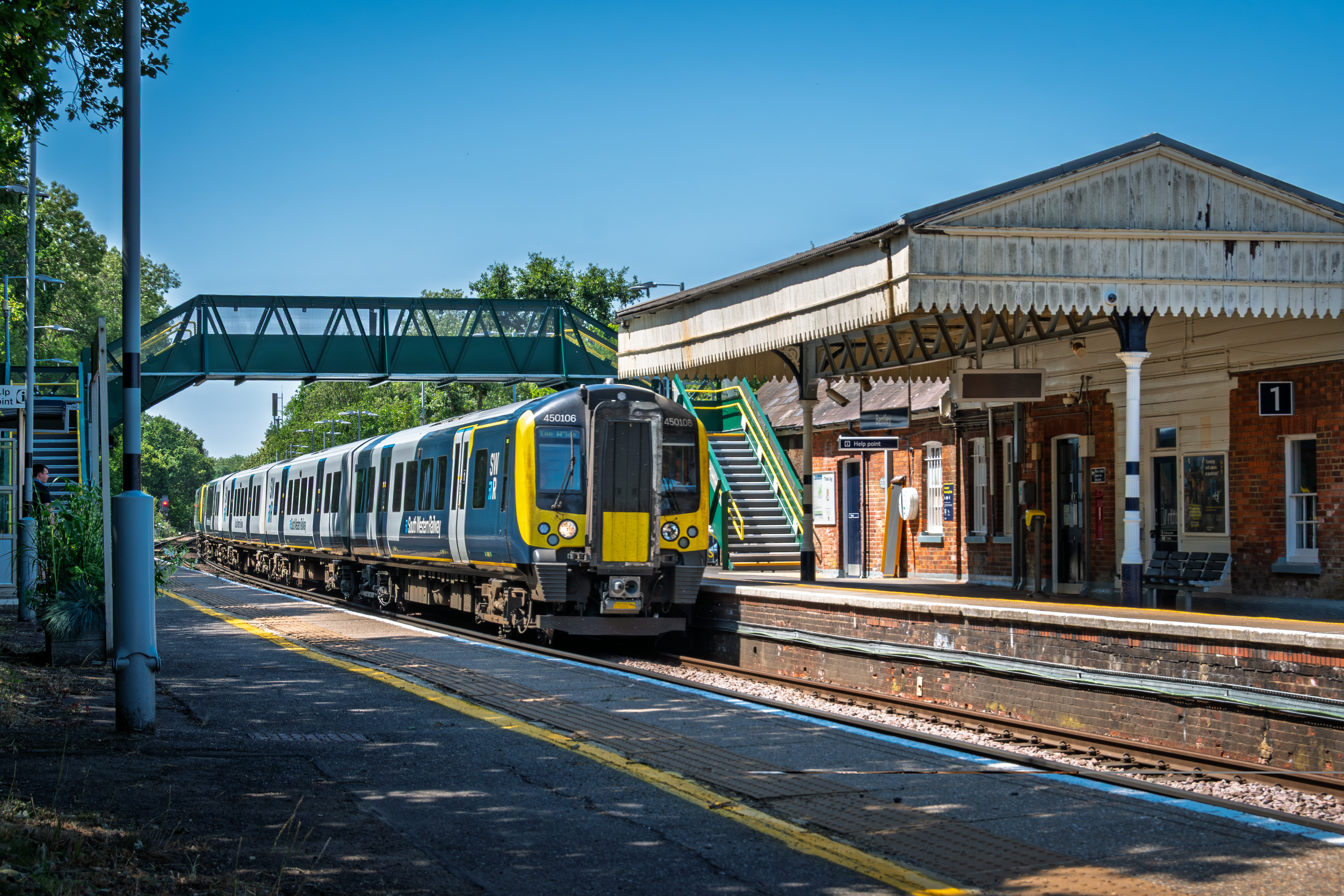
- Bentley railway station in 2026, with a South Western Railway Class 450 entering the platform

General information
- Location: Bentley, East Hampshire; England
- Coordinates: 51.181°N 0.868°W
- Grid reference: SU792430
- Managed by: South Western Railway
- Platforms: 2

Other information
- Station code: BTY
- Classification: DfT category E

History
- Opened: July 1854

Passengers
- 2020/21: ▼20,640
- 2021/22: ▲64,764
- 2022/23: ▲82,486
- 2023/24: ▲98,966
- 2024/25: ▲0.110 million
Location
Notes
- Passenger statistics from the Office of Rail and Road

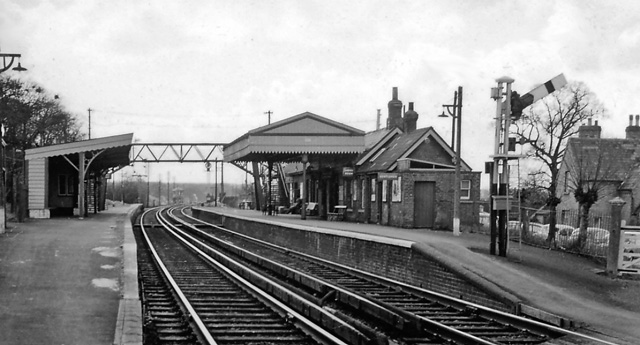
The station in 1963

Bentley railway station serves the village of Bentley in Hampshire, England. It is situated on the Alton Line, between Farnham and Alton. The station and all trains serving it are operated by South Western Railway.

The village of Bentley and the hamlet of Isington are roughly the same distance from the station.

== History ==
Bentley was the northern terminus of the Bentley and Bordon Light Railway, built in 1905 to serve the military camp at Bordon. Built with assistance of the British Army, the line closed to passengers in 1957 (remaining open to serve traffic to the Longmoor Military Railway in times of emergency) and closed to all traffic in 1966; the track was lifted later that same year.

In June 2009, the Association of Train Operating Companies (ATOC) issued a report (Connecting Communities: Expanding Access to the Rail Network), which proposed the reinstatement of the line between Bentley and Bordon, as one of 20 schemes that are recommended for further consultation. 14 of these are reinstatements of lines closed in the Beeching cuts.

== Services ==
Trains operate between Alton and London Waterloo, typically every 30 minutes in each direction, every day of the week. However, as Bentley is the least used station on the line, generally speaking alternate trains omit the stop at Bentley, meaning it has an hourly service. Faster services to London also pass through, but do not stop.

Despite the station having two platforms, the majority of the trains stop at, or pass through platform 1. Platform 2 is only used during peak hours or on Sundays, when the station is used as a passing loop.

| Preceding station | National Rail | Following station |
|---|---|---|
| Farnham | South Western Railway; Alton Line | Alton |
| | Disused railways | |
| Terminus | British Rail; Southern Region; Bordon Light Railway | Kingsley Halt |
