= Shortheath Common =

Nature reserve in Hampshire, England

Coordinates: 51.124°N 0.894°W

- Site of Special Scientific Interest
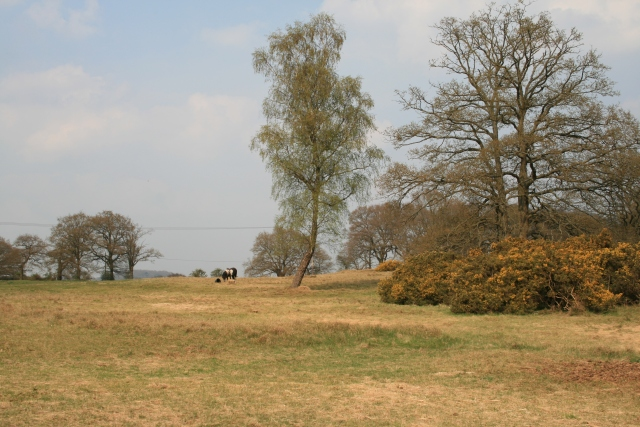
- Location of Shortheath Common.
- Area of search: Hampshire
- Grid reference: SU 775 367
- Interest: Biological
- Area: 59.5 hectares (147 acres)
- Notification date: 1985
- Location map: Magic Map

Shortheath Common is a 59.5-hectare (147-acre) biological Site of Special Scientific Interest west of Bordon in Hampshire. It is also a Local Nature Reserve and a Special Area of Conservation.

The common has areas of bracken, woodland, heath and a pond, but its main ecological interest is a large valley mire. Much of it is covered by Sphagnum mosses, but there are also many vascular plants, such as velvet bent and the insectivorous round-leaved sundew. The invertebrates are also of particular interest, including 23 breeding species of dragonfly.

== Land ownership ==
All land within Shortheath Common SSSI is owned by the local authority.
