= Harris Memorial Garden =

War memorial in Canterbury, England

Coordinates: 51°16′46″N 1°05′07″E

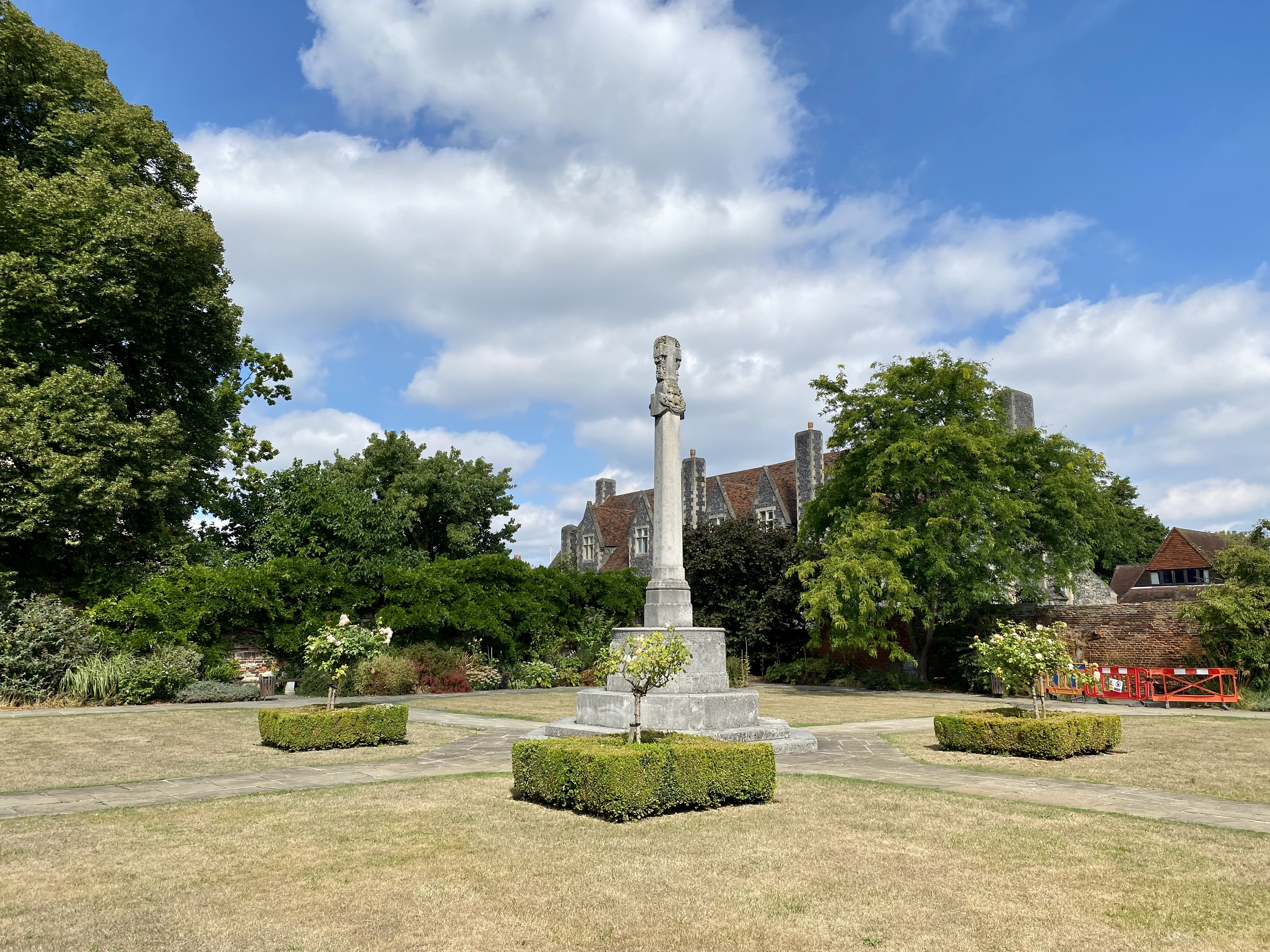
The County of Kent War Memorial Cross in the centre of the garden

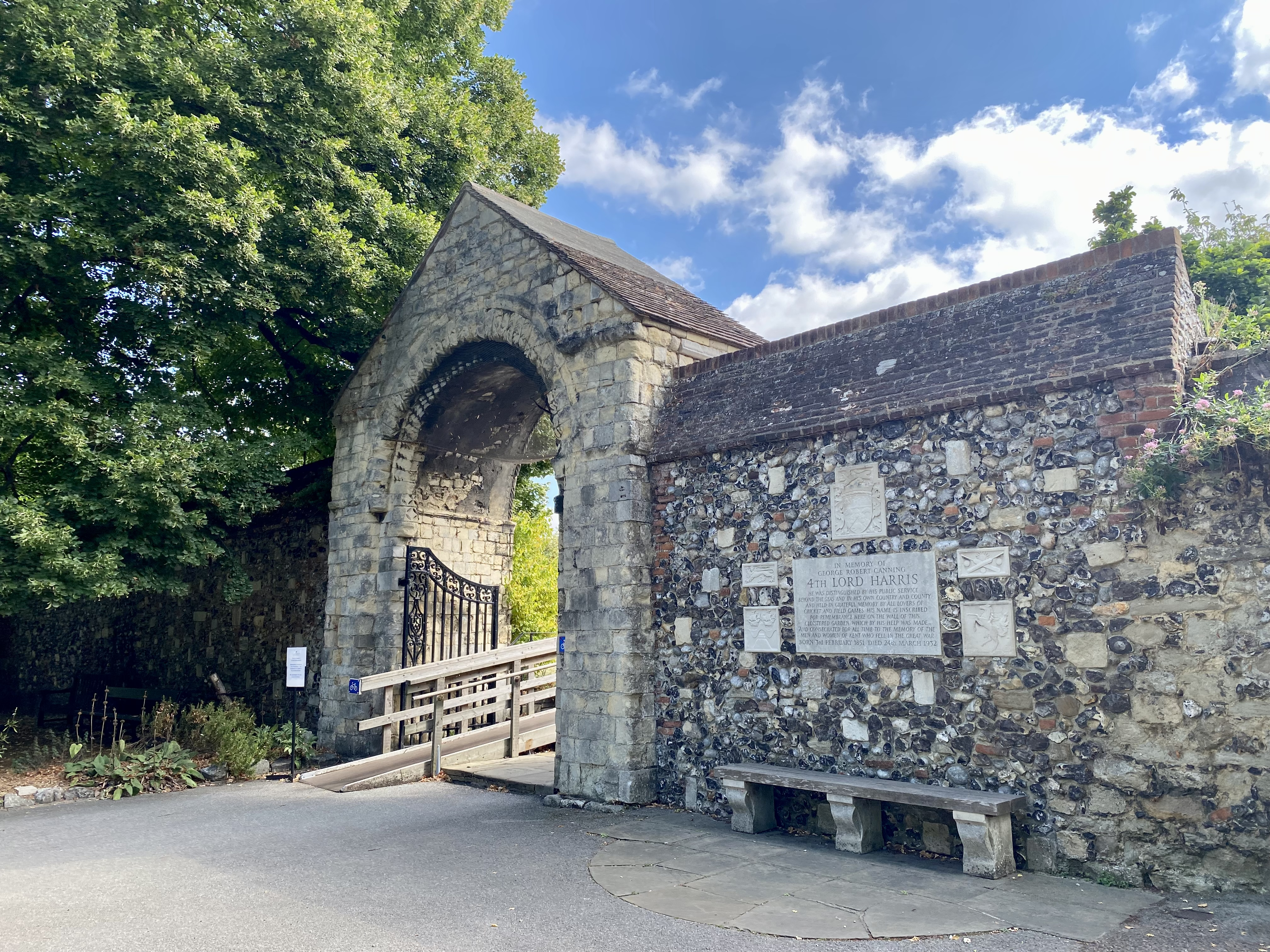
The entrance to the garden in 2022

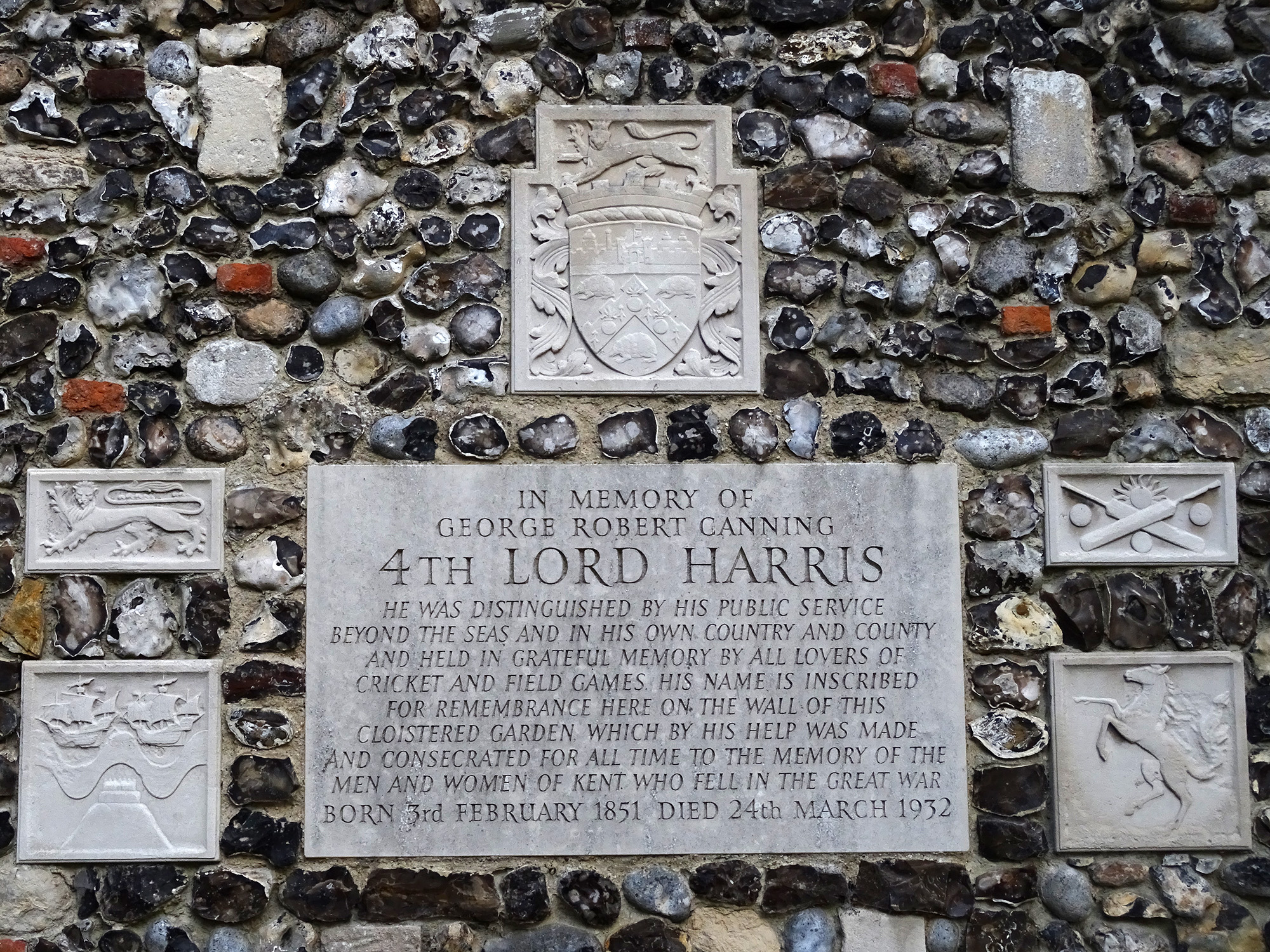
The memorial plaque to George Harris, 4th Baron Harris

The Harris Memorial Garden is a war memorial in The Precincts of Canterbury Cathedral in Canterbury, Kent. The garden is named for George Harris, 4th Baron Harris. The County of Kent War Memorial Cross stands at the centre of the garden. The garden stands as a memorial to the people of Kent killed in the First World War.

The County of Kent War Memorial Cross is listed Grade II* on the National Heritage List for England. It is made from Portland stone and is 6 meters in height. It stands atop a plinth set on three steps and is set in the centre of the garden. The official heritage listing praises the cross as a "carefully-positioned memorial cross providing a striking structural focus at the centre of the Memorial Garden". It was designed by Herbert Baker.

The memorial garden is located to the east of Canterbury Cathedral, in the Cathedral Close, within the Canterbury city walls. The garden stands within the World Heritage Site of Canterbury Cathedral, St Augustine's Abbey, and St Martin's Church. The site occupied by the memorial garden was previously a bowling green. Proposals were raised for the memorial to be located in Maidstone or Rochester, but Canterbury was subsequently chosen in June 1920. The work was funded by public donations and carried out by a Mr George Browning. The memorial cross was unveiled in the garden at a service on 4 August 1921 by Lady Camden, the wife of John Pratt, 4th Marquess Camden, the Lord Lieutenant of Kent. The memorial was dedicated by the Archbishop of Canterbury at the service with an address given by Admiral Hugh Evan-Thomas. Lord Harris presented the garden to Henry Wace, the Dean of Canterbury, at the service. The cross was damaged in the air raids of the Baedeker Blitz in Canterbury, losing pieces of stonework. It was repaired under Harold Anderson, the Surveyor to the Fabric of Canterbury Cathedral.

The garden is cloistered by walls to the south, north and west. The south and north and west walls are individually listed Grade II.
