= Bordon Camp =

British Army camp in Hampshire, England (1863–2015)

- Bordon
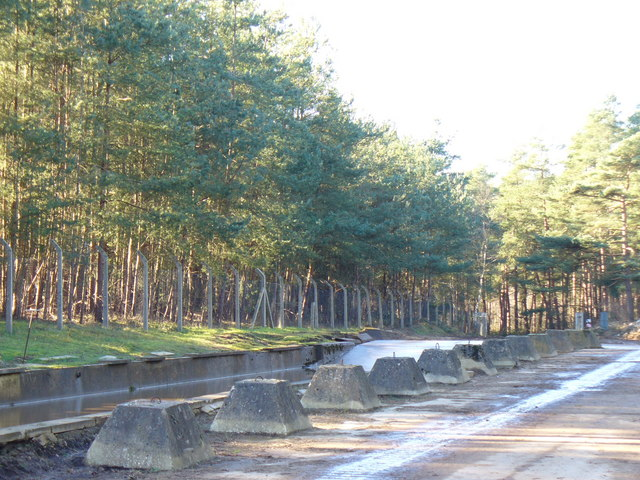
- The tank pit and track, Hogmoor Road at Bordon Training Camp

Site information
- Type: Barracks
- Owner: Ministry of Defence
- Operator: British Army

Location
- Location within Hampshire
- Coordinates: 51.1152°N 0.8735°W

Site history
- Built: 1863
- Built for: War Office
- In use: 1863–2015

Bordon Camp was a British Army camp close to the settlement of Bordon in Hampshire, England. The camp, which was latterly maintained by the Defence Infrastructure Organisation, opened in 1863 and closed in 2015.

== History ==
=== Early history ===
In 1863, the War Department had required additional training grounds for British Army troops. The decision was hence made to build two permanent camps close to Woolmer Forest. The proposal was to construct 140 wooden huts on each site, each 72 feet (22 m) long and 21 feet (6.4 m) wide, giving a combined accommodation for 5,000 men. The first site was laid out in 1899 by the Highland Light Infantry, under the command of the Royal Engineers. This became Bordon Camp, an area of approximately 1 mile (1.6 km) long by .5 miles (0.80 km) wide.

The barracks at Bordon were to be named after successful battles and locations from the North American campaign, during the Seven Years' War against France. The first two camps were thus named St. Lucia and Quebec, starting a long association of the camps with Canada.

Having just returned from the Boer War, the first occupants of Quebec barracks at Bordon Camp were the Somersetshire Light Infantry in April 1903. In June, they were joined at Bordon by the 2nd Battalion Devonshire Regiment. Both set a precedent for the site by marching from Bentley railway station, headed by a marching band.

In May 1903, the 1st Battalion of the Argyll and Sutherland Highlanders and the 2nd Battalion of the Wiltshire Regiment were the first to occupy Longmoor Camp. However it was built on boggy ground and the troops immediately began to complain of problems and the medical officers of ill health. A decision was immediately made by the War Department to move 68 of the Longmoor huts to the Bordon camp site, between 4 miles (6.4 km) and 6 miles (9.7 km) away. The first brick-built barracks were started in 1906, completed in 1907 and named Louisburg Barracks, built to house two regiments of artillery and a riding school, one in Louisburg East and one in Louisburg West. At the northern end of Louisburg Barracks Central Road was a veterinary hospital with 24 loose boxes and 20 stalls, to care for sick artillery horses. This was added to in 1911 by the building of the Royal Engineer lines and associated stables near Bordon crossroads, to accommodate 26th Field Company Royal Engineers. The movement of the huts was completed in May 1905. This move created Gaudaloupe and Martinique barracks on the west side of the A325, enabling the four barracks of Bordon to house a complete infantry brigade.

=== First World War ===
Officers of the 1st Battalion, Queen's Royal Regiment, at Bordon Camp, Hampshire, 11 August 1914. Seated in the centre of the second row is the colonel of the regiment, Major General Sir Edward Hamilton.

Bordon was used by the Canadian Army as a staging post for "under-fire" troop training in the First World War. Troops were shipped into Glasgow and Liverpool Docks, and then transported by train direct to Bordon. The Canadians under Commanding Officer William Mahlon Davis used tents in their first occupation, setting up camps named after the Great Lakes in the Bramshott Camp area: Erie, Huron, Superior and Ontario. The speciality Canadian Forestry Corps set up a steam-powered saw mill near the Deer's Hut Inn, Liphook.

=== Interwar ===
In 1924, 32 acres (13 ha) in Alexandra Park were purchased, added to in 1927 by 916 acres (371 ha) of farmland and common land between Bordon and Oakhanger, for use as additional training areas. The 1930s started with the building of the RASC Lines on the edge of Louisburg Barracks. This brought about the demolition in 1937 of the old wooden huts at both Quebec and St Lucia barracks, with new brick built 100-man barracks in their place.

The 1930s construction ended with the building of the wooden hutted training camp at Oxney Farm, named Martinique barracks.

=== Second World War ===
The British 3rd Infantry Brigade was resident in Bordon in 1939, but was dispatched in its entirety at the start of hostilities of World War II, as part of the British Expeditionary Force. The men left from Liss railway station on specially chartered trains, direct to Southampton Docks.

When the Canadian Army was looking for a European base, the British Army offered them Bordon and Longmoor Military Camps, which they took over entirely from September 1939 under a British officer commanding the local service and civilian personnel. The Canadians built two new sub-camps, using Canadian built and shipped prefabricated wooden huts:

- Oakhanger Camp: After the end of hostilities, taken over by the Ministry of Supply to sell surplus Army vehicles, which covered the whole of Slab Common. Dismantled in about 1950, to make way for present married officers' quarters on Bolley Avenue.
- Lower Oakhanger Camp: located below the level crossing in Station Road, it was used by the Canadians until D-Day, after which it became a German prisoner of war camp. After the end of hostilities and the return home of the Germans, it was used by European Volunteer Workers who left in the mid-1950s. The huts were dismantled, and the concrete bases became used for helicopter practice landing grounds by RAF Odiham. Havannah Officers' Mess was built on the site in 1979.

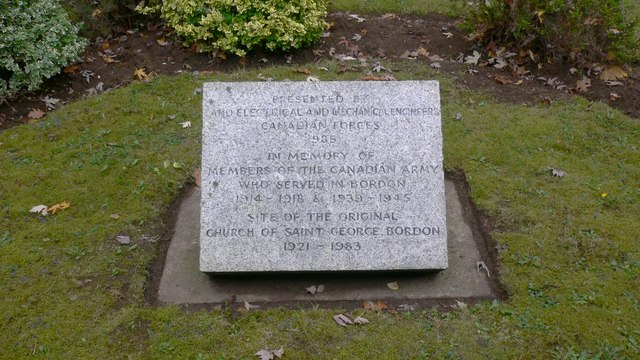
Memorial to those of the Canadian Army who served at Bordon in both world wars

As part of their local security remit, the Canadians built numerous security points and anti-aircraft bases around the town of Bordon, on which tanks and armoured cars were parked, leaving today a patchwork of elderly but still visible concrete slabs. The Canadians had their own fire station, located at the junction of Budds Lane and Station Road, and hence able to access either camp. Canadians also, in part manned the garrison fire station throughout World War II.

=== Post-war ===
With troop training moved to Aldershot, the camps became home to various units of Royal Electrical and Mechanical Engineers, which were eventually consolidated under one unit based at the Bordon barracks from the 1960s onwards. Various motor transport divisions consolidated to the base during the 1960s, only to leave for Shrewsbury in the 1980s. This brought about the consolidation of the camps' facilities, with tracts of land occupied by old buildings and structures sold to the district council for civilian redevelopment, such as that at Pinewood Village.

After the buildings at the RASC Lines were demolished in 1973, the site was redeveloped as married quarters. Then came the building of the new Havannah barracks (renamed Prince Philip Barracks on 27 June 1984), built to what was a standard design known as the "Sandhurst Block", laid out to house a battalion or regiment in one barracks unit. The old wooden hut Martinique barracks were renamed the San Domingo barracks. These were dismantled in 1983 by contractors for erection elsewhere.

Bordon became home to 10 Training Battalion the Royal Electrical and Mechanical Engineers, providing trade training, both basic and supplementary, supported by the School of Electrical and Mechanical Engineers (SEME). In July 2011 the then Defence Secretary, Dr Liam Fox, announced that RAF Lyneham would be the new site of the Defence Technical Training Change Programme (DTTCP) centre. This would coincide with the closures of Arborfield Garrison and the School of Electrical and Mechanical Engineering (SEME) at Bordon, with all posts at both bases moving to Lyneham in 2015.

== Bordon Camp facilities ==
=== Bordon Post Office ===
Post was essential for the morale of all troops, and so a post office was set up in Quebec barracks for the entire Bordon and Longmoor complex. This was moved from the wooden huts to a new brick building in 1908 on the far side of Camp Road, being renamed Bordon Post Office. The site today is still the location of the local Royal Mail depot, and unified army and civilian post office.

=== Church of England Soldiers Institute ===
In August 1904, Princess Alexander of Teck opened the Church of England Soldiers Institute. Built close to Luisburg barracks of corrugated iron structure at a cost of £1,500, it was "open to all soldiers and sailors wearing the King's uniform regardless of religion."

A new large hall was added in September 1906, capable of seating 500. At one end was a stage, while at the other was a chancel: both could be covered by roller shutters, depending on the hall's usage. In 1908 the Brownlow Hall was added and named after Major General Brownlow, who was president of the C. of E. Institutes. Used solely for entertainment, it was used as a cinema until the opening of the Empire Club in 1938.

The building was closed in 1960, and demolished. The site is now occupied by a Tesco, One Stop convenience store.

=== Wesleyan Soldiers Home ===
Opened in 1905, it was located 300 yards (270 m) behind the C. of E. Institute. Its wooden structure covered with a dark green painted corrugated iron roof cost £2,500 to build. Surrounded by a garden, the building enclosed: a games room, a billiard room, a reading and writing room, a devotional room, and a lecture hall seating 300. There were ten bedrooms and three bedrooms, plus a suite for the chaplain. Together with the C. of E. Institute, the building was closed and demolished in 1960.

=== Bordon Officers' Sports Club ===
In 1910, a cricket ground and associated pavilion were placed north of Gibbs Lane. The club house construction in 1922 was paid for by the local officers club, being constructed of wooden frame with wooden sheeting siding, plus concrete tiles, to fit in with the village green feel. The building housed: a smoking room, dining room, gentlemen's cloakroom, ladies' room, ladies cloakroom and a steward's quarters. In 1928 a 21-year rotating lease was drawn up, and the old cricket pavilion became the groundsman's storeroom. The facility was now invested in from 1930 onwards, with: two squash courts, a badminton court, card room and a kitchen was added to the indoors clubhouse facilities. Outside were added: eight grass and two hard tennis courts, a polo field, a hockey pitch and rugby grounds. The result was that the lease was transferred to the United Services Trustees in 1937.

After a lease renewal in 1959 for an additional 21 years, in 1977 after the Army School of Transport left the garrison, the number of serving officers making use of the club dwindled rapidly. With new sporting facilities being built at Havannah barracks, the decision was taken to hand over the management and the lease to a civilian committee, completed in 1980. From this date, it became Bordon and Oakhanger Sports Club.

=== Empire Club ===
The Empire Club was opened by Field Marshal Lord Methuen on 17 December 1913. The club had a full-time gardener, two grass tennis courts and a bowling green. Although it made a profit throughout World War I and just after, by the early 1930s attempts by both the NAAFI and YMCA to operate it commercially failed. Bordon Entertainments Ltd took a 21-year lease on the club in July 1938. In 1946, NAAFI opened a competing garrison club in Louisburg Barracks South. The result was a series of improvements, including: conversion of the dance hall to a cinema, a new ballroom and bar in 1955 and a lido in 1963. In 1977, after the Army School of Transport left the garrison, the Empire Club lease reverted to the district council. In 1987, the club burnt down while still under council control. Proposed to be rebuilt as an arts centre, the site is now civilian domestic housing, and forms part of Pinewood Village.

=== Medical facilities ===
The original joint medical and dental centres were replaced in 1964 by a new building opposite the Empire Club. Known as the "Mississippi Steamboat" due to its shape and huge singular steel chimney, it is being replaced by a new centre to be located on Budds Lane.

=== Schooling ===
In 1906, a junior school was built in Station Road, Bordon and an infant school in Lamerton Road. The infant school was only used in the afternoon for schooling, being used for military instruction in the morning. Prior to the Education Act 1944, these were controlled by the military, after which they came under the control of Hampshire County Council Local Education Authority. In 1965, a new junior school opened in Budds Lane on the site of the former married quarters, while the infants moved to the former junior school. The old infants school was demolished in 1966. In 1979, a new infants school opened in Budds Lane, and the old school leased to the local authority, named Barbados House after the earlier barracks on the site. The building today houses the Phoenix Theatre.

=== Fire station ===
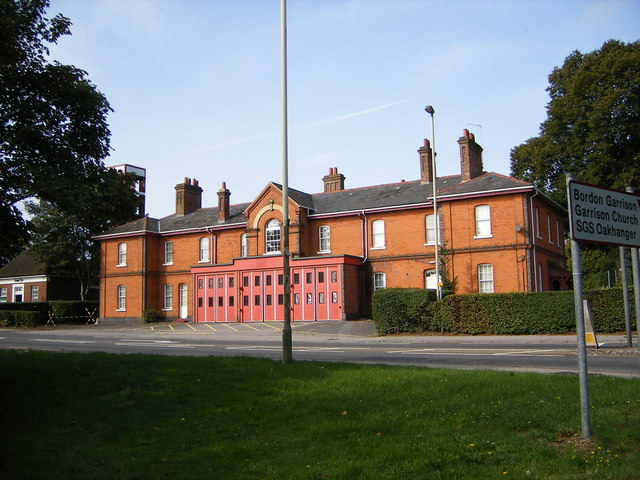
The former fire station, latterly an RAF facility, disused since 2005

There was a fire station on site from 1906, staffed in rotation by trained members of each unit stationed on garrison, under the control of the Army Service Corps. Equipped with a single horse drawn pump, the station had three stables. From 1920 the station was equipped with motorised Thornycroft fire engine, while the building also housed a section of the Royal Military Police.

Although the fire service role was taken over by the civilian station in 1938, it returned to the garrison at the start of World War II, when the officer in charge of the garrison also moved his headquarters to the same building. As a result, in 1940 the fire engines were upgraded to new Leyland Motors lorries.

Post war the station remained in operation, serving both the garrison as well as the local civilian population. From 1958 onwards, the station was civilian staffed, equipped with Green Goddess Bedford 3 tonners. These were replaced in 1973 by Bedford domestic water tenders carrying 450 imperial gallons (2,000 L; 540 US gal) of water.

In 1989, after the completion of a new civilian fire station within Bordon, the Royal Air Force took over the old fire station building. Renamed Oakhanger Fire Station, it was closed in 2005 when the nearby RAF Oakhanger was outsourced.

=== Religious facilities ===
==== Tin Tabernacle ====
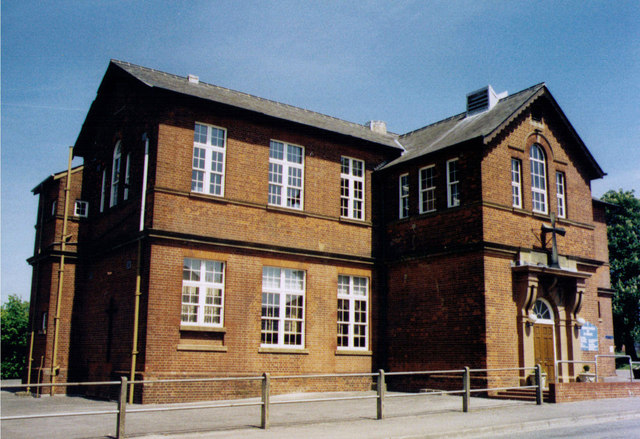
The former RA institute, now the garrison Church of St George

Church of England services were held in the gym on camp opening, then transferred in 1906 to the C. of E. Soldiers Institute when it opened, in a space also used by the Roman Catholic congregation. In February 1921, St. George's Garrison Church was erected in Budds Lane, also known as the Tin Tabernacle due to its corrugated iron shell on wooden framed construction. Its organ and furnishings came from the former Army depot at the Curragh, after the pullout of the British Army post the creation of the Irish Republic. Demolished in 1983, services moved to the former R.A. Institute.

==== Roman Catholic Church ====
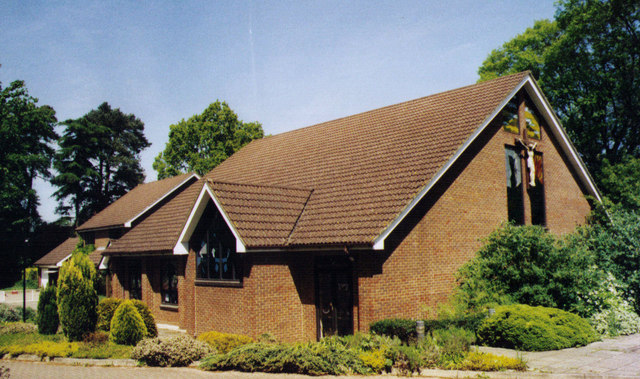
Sacred Heart Roman Catholic Church, Bordon, built 1990

There has been a Roman Catholic place of worship on the garrison site since the opening of Bordon camp. The priest was provided with a portable altar, which could be set up where ever space could be found. Initially this was within a marque set-up on St Lucia barracks square, which then moved to a wooden hut on Kildare Close. The hut was used for living accommodation from the outbreak of World War I, the location again became portable. In 1919, parishioners converted an allocated former wooden canteen opposite Martinique House, which became Sacred Heart Church. This was demolished in 1990, with a new brick church built on the top of Chalet Hill.

==== Reredos ====
The C. of E. church housed the reredos, an altarpiece memorial to all units who have served in Bordon since its creation. In the form of a large painting, it was created by David Shepherd for a cost of £1,000. The scene depicts the central figure of Jesus Christ standing on a mound, with four uniformed men kneeling dressed and armed in the style of soldiers who served in the South African War, the First and Second World Wars and Korean War, with a chaplain standing giving the blessing. In the background are depicted all the arms and corps, who have served in Bordon.

Dedicated on 22 July 1964 by the chaplain general, the reredos is the property of St. George's Garrison Church and the chaplain general. If no garrison church is built in the future, it will become the property of the Royal Army Chaplains Department Depot.

== Bordon Military Cemetery ==
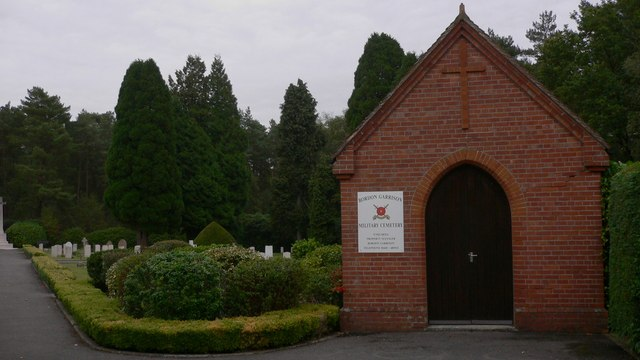
The chapel and graveyard at Bordon Military Cemetery

Land was originally set aside for a cemetery on the west side of the A325. However, there is no evidence that it was used, with burials occurring in the civilian cemeteries in either Headley or Greatham. The site is now the Woolmer trading estate.

In 1908, work started on a new military cemetery on Bolley Avenue. It opened in April 1910, consecrated by the chaplain-general to the forces, the Rt. Rev. Bishop I. Taylor-Smith CVO DD, with music from 3rd Battalion, the Rifle Brigade.

The grounds can be used for burial by any serving member of the armed forces, and their dependants. It hence includes both Canadian and South Africans who were camped in Bordon during the two world wars. It also acted as a temporary cemetery for nine United States Army soldiers, later returned to the United States after the end of hostilities in 1947. Separate areas are set aside for the various denominations, including one member of the Dutch Reformed Church, and one Gurkha. The sole non-military civilian burial is the grave of Mrs Alice Emily Chandler, who lived in the former stable house of the camps fire station, killed with a Canadian officer and two NCOs by a Luftwaffe bomb on 16 August 1940.

The Commonwealth War Graves Commission register and maintain the graves there of 186 Commonwealth service personnel of World War I and 8 of World War II, the nationalities being 68 British, 27 South Africans and 25 Canadians.

== Broxhead House ==
Broxhead House was built by Admiral Thomas Foley, hero of the Battle of the Nile, in 1877. After purchase of the Broxhead estate in November 1902 by the War Department, the house was used by the general officer commanding, and later the brigade commander of the garrison. From the start of World War II, it was used as the local divisional headquarters, until that was moved in November 1940 to Batts Hall, Frensham. It was then made the UK headquarters for the Canadian Army in Europe. At the end of the war, it was initially used as a medical reception facility, and then as an officers' hotel. At the start of 1952 it became the Central Volunteer Headquarters (CVHQ) of the Royal Electrical and Mechanical Engineers, until they moved to Louisburg Barracks in 1979. In 1981 Molex bought Wolfe Lodge and then Broxhead House, with the house demolished in 1983 to make way for new laboratories. The site is now named Lion Court.

== Memorial ==
A commemorative stone was erected by the Land Electrical and Mechanical Engineers of the Canadian Forces in June 1985, on the site of the Tin Tabernacle, in memory of members of the Canadian Army who served in Bordon during both world wars. The maple leaf was even adopted by 4 Battalion REME as a background to the "IV" in their logo.
