= Bordon Light Railway =

Railway line in United Kingdom

Coordinates: 51°7′23.35″N 0°52′7.06″W

The Bordon Light Railway was a short-lived light railway line in Hampshire that connected the Army Camp at Bordon, as well as the villages of Bordon and Kingsley, with the national rail network at Bentley on the main Farnham-Alton line, a distance of 4.5 miles (7.2 km).

== History ==
Following the end of the Boer War, a number of military camps were established to accommodate the returning soldiers. Amongst these featured "Bordon Camp" which was built on agricultural land near the village of Bordon 4 1/2 miles to the south of Bentley station, and "Longmoor Camp" 4½ miles further south near the village of Whitehill. Two battalions were assigned to Longmoor where they were housed in corrugated huts constructed on soft ground. This led to complaints from the soldiers and in 1903 it was decided to move them and the huts to Bordon Camp. To save costs, a temporary primitive railway line with a 18 in (457 mm) gauge was laid to Bordon to facilitate the move.

The increased military presence at Bordon coupled with its proximity to the national rail network at Bentley led to an application being made on 6 October 1902 for a light railway order under the Light Railways Act 1896, the Bentley and Bordon Light Railway Order 1902, authorising a standard gauge connection from Bentley to a point just west of Bordon village. The application received the backing of the War Department which saw the railway as a means of easing troop movements and bringing supplies to both camps. It was also hoped that the local communities along the line would also be able to make use of the new connection. An agreement for the line's operation was reached with the London and South Western Railway (L&SWR), the operator of the Alton line, with whom the War Department had already collaborated in the construction of the Basingstoke and Alton Light Railway in 1901. Under the terms of the agreement, the LSWR would manage, work and maintain the railway, providing the engines, rolling stock and plant.

The necessary land was acquired by the LSWR with the War Department's assistance, and construction was completed within 18 months at a cost of £30,000. The work was overseen by Alfred W. Szlumper of the L&SWR. In total, 155 men using three locomotives, four tip wagons and three horses were involved. The line was officially opened on 11 December 1905 from a bay platform at Bentley station. Eight trains were run from Bentley to Bordon on weekdays, with seven return services (except for Saturday when there were eight). Two trains ran each way on Sundays.

== Kingsley Halt ==
The LSWR managed to acquire sufficient land near the village of Kingsley (3 miles to the south of Bentley) where it decided to site a station in the hope that the area would attract residential development. With fairly basic facilities, the station was only a halt and opened after the rest of the line on 7 March 1906.

In 1905 the War Department began the construction of the Longmoor Military Railway, a standard gauge line which would connect Longmoor Military Camp with the LSWR's terminus at Bordon. This itself was linked to the main Waterloo-Portsmouth line at Liss in 1942. It was possible to travel to Liss from Bordon via Oakhanger Halt on the Longmoor Railway.

== Decline and closure ==
British Rail closure notice (1957)

The fortunes of the Bordon Light Railway were inextricably linked with those of the Army Camp that it served, so that when army traffic began to decline after the Second World War and the line became a financial liability, the decision was made to close the line to passenger services with effect from 16 September 1957, with the line remaining open to freight to meet army requirements. It might have closed completely had the Longmoor Military Railway been able to serve the Bordon Camp's requirements, but in the event the frequency of services at Liss made the exchange of heavy traffic difficult. This was still the case nine years later when it was decided nevertheless to close the Bordon line completely from 4 April 1966. The Longmoor Military Railway itself closed three years later on 31 October 1969.

== Route of the line ==
Departing Bentley from the Bordon bay platform (created by extending the down platform then separated from the main line platform by iron railings), services would proceed on the main down line in the direction of Alton for 17 chains before reaching the junction for Bordon at which stood the Bentley signal box. The line to Bordon branched off to the south here, climbing up towards Kingsley of 1 in 156. After 1 mile 10 chains it reached Blacknest Road level crossing, an ungated crossing which was protected by cattle grids. The line then gradually dropped towards Kingsley Halt (2 miles 57 chains from Bentley), proceeding again over Blacknest Road level crossing, another ungated crossing with cattle grids.

Continuing towards Bordon, the line passed over several bridges (including one over Kingsley-East Worldham Road) before climbing again on 1 in 358 and then descending on 1 in 145, proceeding on a level over White Hill Road level crossing (known locally as "Marsh's Crossing") and reaching Bordon (4 miles 58 chains from Bentley).

== The line today and possible re-opening ==
Following the line's closure in 1966, the track was lifted later the same year. None of the stations now survive except Bentley, while the Bordon station is now buried under an industrial trading estate.

A bus service now provides a link from Bentley to Bordon, and onwards to Liss – effectively replicating the line and the Longmoor Railway. It has been mooted that as this bus service is now so well utilised, that it should be replaced by a railway link. In August 2007 Liberal Democrat Councillor Philip Drury, member for Whitehill (Hogmoor), proposed the re-opening of the line to relieve the pressure on the busy A325 road, particularly as the local population is likely to increase with the construction of 5,500 homes when the Army pulls out of Bordon. A re-opened line would also relieve pressure on the Waterloo-Portsmouth line and enable local students to attend colleges in Alton and Guildford. Due to the redevelopment of the Bordon station site, any plans would have to incorporate a diversion around this area. Councillor Drury's proposal received support from the chairman of the Whitehill Bordon Opportunity, Councillor Cowper who is also the leader of East Hampshire District Council.

In June 2009, the Association of Train Operating Companies (ATOC) issued a report (Connecting Communities: Expanding Access to the Rail Network), which proposes the reinstatement of the line between Bentley and Bordon, as one of 20 schemes that are recommended for further consultation. 14 of these are reinstatements of lines closed in the Beeching cuts.
