= Bordon =

Town in Hampshire, England

Coordinates: 51.11238°N 0.86425°W

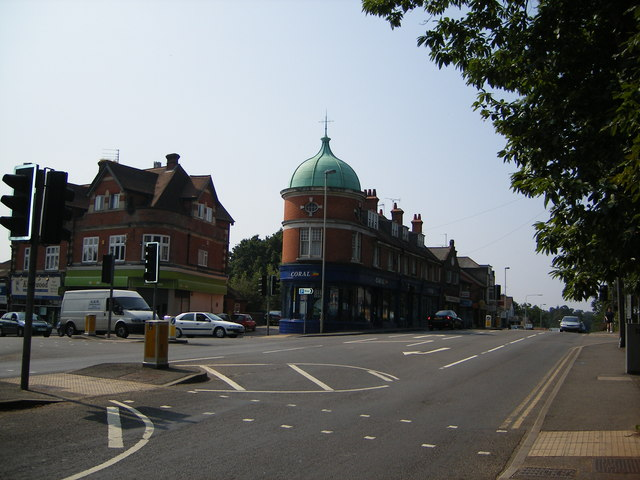
- Looking over Chalet Hill, centre of Bordon.

- Location within Hampshire
- Population: 16,035 (2011 census)
- OS grid reference: SU796354
- Civil parish: Whitehill
- District: East Hampshire
- Shire county: Hampshire
- Region: South East
- Country: England
- Sovereign state: United Kingdom
- Post town: BORDON
- Postcode district: GU35
- Dialling code: 01420
- Police: Hampshire and Isle of Wight
- Fire: Hampshire and Isle of Wight
- Ambulance: South Central
- UK Parliament: Farnham and Bordon

Bordon is a town in the East Hampshire district of Hampshire, England. It lies in the interior of the royal Woolmer Forest, about 5 miles (8.0 km) southeast of Alton. The town forms a part of the civil parish of Whitehill which is one of two contiguous villages, the other being Lindford. The civil parish is on the A325, and near the A3 road between London and Portsmouth, from which it is buffered by the rise of the wooded Woolmer Ranges. Bordon is twinned with Condé-sur-Vire in Normandy, France.

Unlike its nearest towns, Petersfield, Farnham and Alton, Bordon has not been a market town, having developed as a military area. Many of the facilities are near the former A325, a toll road (turnpike) that connected Farnham to the A3 to its south and passed through Bordon and Whitehill; the A325 now by-passes the built-up area. Local facilities include The Phoenix Theatre and Whitehill and Bordon Leisure Centre.

== Education ==
Primary schools in Bordon include Bordon Juniors, Weyford Nursery, Woodlea School and Weyford Primary. Secondary education facilities include Oakmoor School on Budds Lane and Hollywater School, a Special Education establishment. Bordon was also home to the Future Skills Centre, a £3.8 million construction training centre which was part of the Basingstoke College of Technology group until 2024, it has been up for sale since it was initially closed.

In November 2019, Mill Chase Academy closed after 60 years, being replaced by Oakmoor School.

== History ==
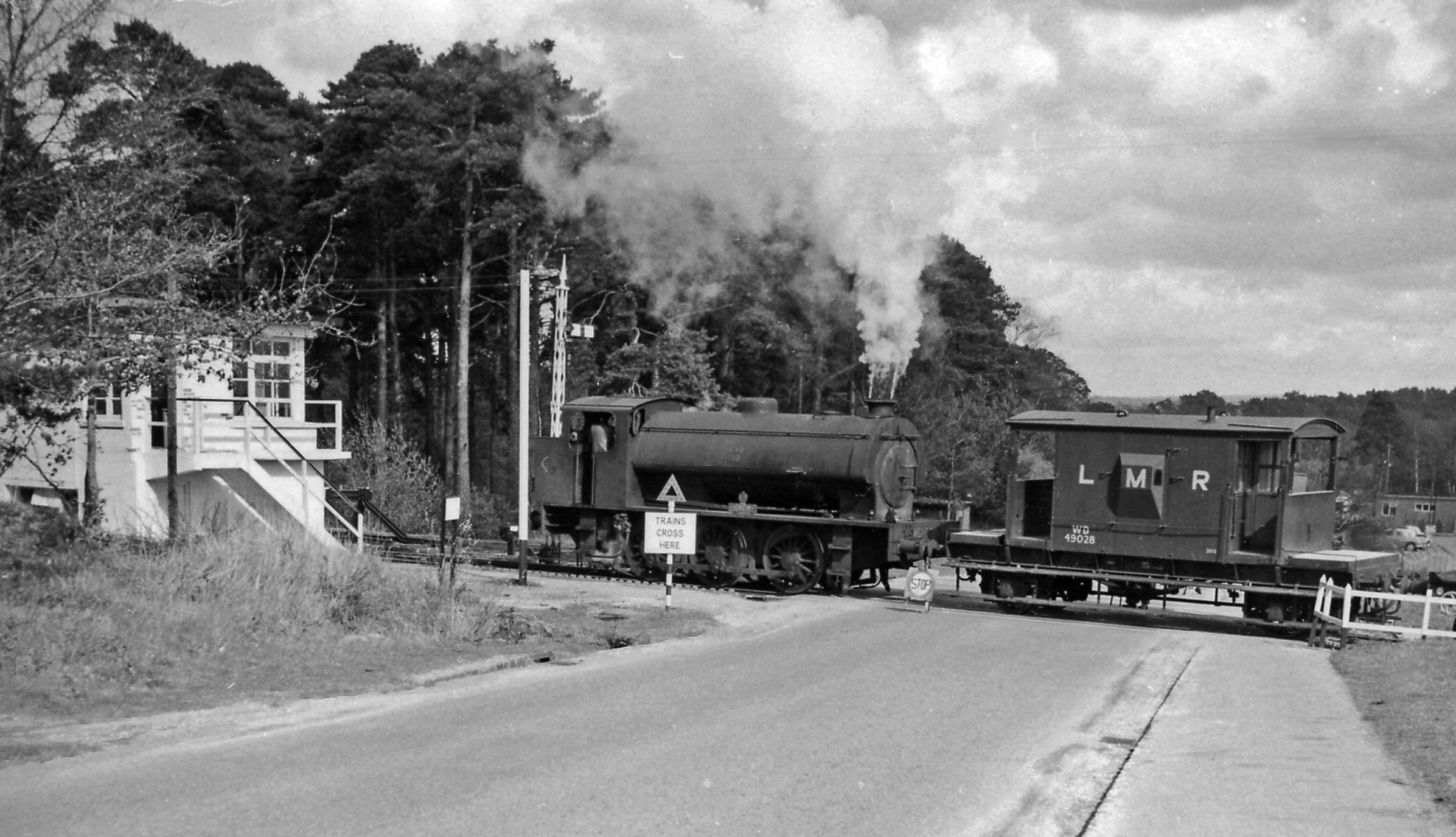
Longmoor Military Railway crossing road at Bordon, 1963

The town has been an army base with a defunct railway station. Bordon Camp was first laid out in 1899 by the Highland Light Infantry, directed by Royal Engineers, and following interruption by the Second Boer War, was occupied by the army from 1903. The first occupants of Quebec barracks were the Somersetshire Light Infantry, returning from South Africa in April, and the 2nd Battalion Devonshire Regiment arrived at St. Lucia Barracks from South Africa in June. Bordon Camp was home to the Canadian Army during both of the world wars and the town is dotted with concrete slabs on which tanks and armoured cars were parked. Until 2016, Bordon was home to the Royal Electrical and Mechanical Engineers (REME), providing trade training, both basic and supplementary, to its soldiers, supported by the School of Electrical and Mechanical Engineers (SEME). The Longmoor Army Ranges, a forest firing range, is south of the town. Bordon railway station was linked to both the main railway network, and by light railway to the Longmoor Military Railway.

== Eco-town proposal ==
In 2009, the governing Labour administration nationally announced Bordon as one of its tentative Eco-towns in consultative, outline plans. This, dovetailed with the Town Council's 'Green Town Vision', would see the development of Whitehill-Bordon as a carbon-neutral town with sustainable housing and business facilities. The existing Green Town Vision aimed to ensure that all new development of the town would by beneficial to the local environment, and the Eco-town would provide support and funding felt necessary to regenerate the few low standard homes and streets. The proposal initially earmarked 5000 new homes, along with supporting infrastructure, which would require extensive use of greenfield land and reallocation of ex-military land following discontinuance of local military bases.

The scheme was generally supported by the local authority. Local residents objected to the plan's scale and features, citing the road-centric transport network, inevitable net loss of visual amenity, forest, few remaining cultivated fields, scale and diversity of habitats for the remnant Woolmer Forest. After the announcement of the Eco-town plan, a group of residents formed the Bordon Area Action Group, and opposed the scheme. They argued that the development failed sustainability tests, and claimed that consultation was rigged. Other residents supported the scheme and consultation continued. During the coalition government of 2010–15 its likelihood waned. Funding was cut by half, government looked more critically and skeptically into certain aspects.

The raft of project proposals continues and those awarded funding, such as free public-amenity internet, have been implemented. The Whitehill & Bordon Masterplan was finalised in 2012.

== Transport ==
=== Rail ===
The nearest railway station is 4 miles (6.4 km) south-east in Liphook, which is on the Portsmouth Direct Line. The town had its own station on the Bordon Light Railway, which was closed in 1966. In 2009, the Association of Train Operating Companies proposed reinstating a rail link with the town, and a feasibility study, concluded in February 2012, was undertaken. The outcome was a plausible link to the existing Alton Line at Bentley, Hampshire, with an estimated cost of £170m.

=== Road ===
Bordon and Whitehill are by-passed by the A325, which links them to the A3 (which passes through the parish) and to Farnham. The town is served by Stagecoach South bus routes to Aldershot, Liphook, Haslemere, Alton and Basingstoke.

== Media ==
Local news and television programmes are provided by BBC South and ITV Meridian. Television signals are received from either the Midhurst or Hannington TV transmitters.

Local radio stations are BBC Radio Surrey, Greatest Hits Radio Surrey & East Hampshire, and Wey Valley Radio, a community based station which broadcasts from Alton.

The town is served by the local newspapers, Bordon Herald and Petersfield Post.

== Places of worship ==
- Sacred Heart Catholic Church, High Street.
- St Mark's Shared Church, Pinehill Road.
