= River Wey =

River in southern England

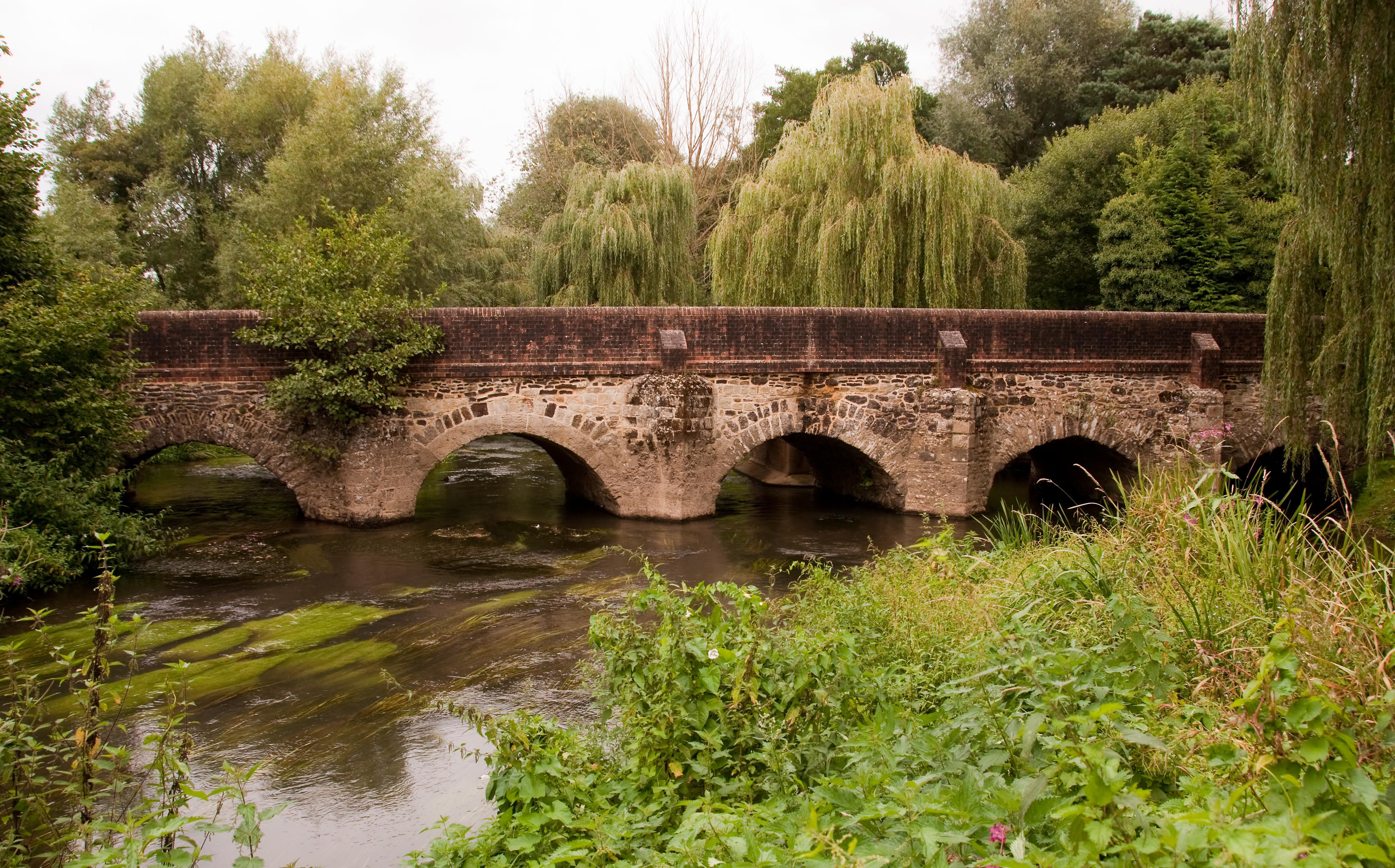
- Elstead Bridge, originally built by the monks of Waverley Abbey

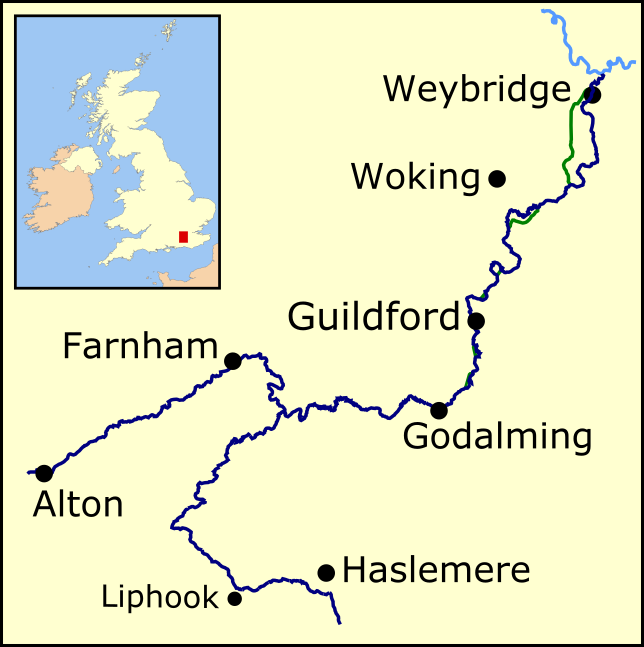
- Map of the River Wey (dark blue), also showing part of the River Thames (light blue) and canal sections of the Wey and Godalming Navigations (green).

Location
- Country: England
- Counties: West Sussex; Hampshire; Surrey
- Districts / Boroughs: Chichester (district), East Hampshire (district), Waverley, Guildford, Woking, Elmbridge, Runnymede
- Towns: Alton, Haslemere, Farnham, Godalming, Guildford, Weybridge

Physical characteristics
- Source: spring
  - location: Alton, East Hampshire, Hampshire
  - coordinates: 51.145°N 0.995°W
  - elevation: 109 metres (358 ft)
- 2nd source: pond
  - location: Black Down, West Sussex, Chichester, West Sussex
  - coordinates: 51.059°N 0.700°W
  - elevation: 199 metres (653 ft)
- Source confluence
  - location: Tilford, Waverley, Surrey
  - coordinates: 51.184°N 0.752°W
  - elevation: 51 metres (167 ft)
- Mouth: River Thames
  - location: Weybridge, Elmbridge, Surrey
  - coordinates: 51.380°N 0.456°W
  - elevation: 12 metres (39 ft)
- Length: 140 km (87 mi)
- Basin size: 904 km^{2} (349 sq mi)
- Discharge
  - location: Weybridge (mouths)
  - average: 6.76 m^{3}/s (239 cu ft/s)
  - minimum: 1.30 m^{3}/s (46 cu ft/s) 12 August 1990
  - maximum: 74.8 m^{3}/s (2,640 cu ft/s) 29 December 1979
- Discharge
  - location: Farnham (north/western branch)
  - average: 0.73 m^{3}/s (26 cu ft/s)
- Discharge
  - location: Tilford (confluence of both branches)
  - average: 3.25 m^{3}/s (115 cu ft/s)
- Discharge
  - location: Guildford
  - average: 5.17 m^{3}/s (183 cu ft/s)

Basin features
- Progression: Wey (north branch), Wey, Thames; Wey (south branch), Wey, Thames
- River system: Thames Basin
- Tributaries
  - left: Nadder Stream, Bentworth Stream, Oakhanger Stream, Kingsley Stream, Oxney Stream, Hell Ditch, Hoe Stream, Hollywater, Deadwater, River Slea
  - right: River Tillingbourne, Cranleigh Waters, River Ock, East Clandon Stream, Guileshill Brook, Royal Brook, Stratford Brook, Truxford Brook

The River Wey is a chalk river and a main tributary of the River Thames in south east England. Its two branches, one of which rises near Alton in Hampshire and the other in West Sussex to the south of Haslemere, (Note: The western and southern county borders of Surrey approximate the watershed of the lower Chertsey Bourne, Wey and Mole.) join at Tilford in Surrey. Once combined, the flow is eastwards then northwards via Godalming and Guildford to meet the Thames at Weybridge. Downstream the river forms the backdrop to Newark Priory and Brooklands. The Wey and Godalming Navigations were built in the 17th and 18th centuries, to create a navigable route from Godalming to the Thames.

The Wey drains much of south west Surrey (as well as parts of east Hampshire and the north of West Sussex) and has a total catchment area of 904 square kilometres (350 sq mi). Although it is the longest tributary of the Thames (if the Medway is excluded), its total average discharge is lower than that of the Kennet and Cherwell. The river morphology and biodiversity of the Wey are well studied, with many places to take samples and record data. The main tributary is the Tillingbourne, which rises on the western slopes of Leith Hill and flows westwards to join the Wey to the south of Guildford, between Shalford and Peasmarsh.

== Toponymy ==
The name is first recorded as Waie in the year 675. The meaning and origin of its name is an unclear one, yet is most likely derived from a Proto-Indo-European (in other words, pre-Iron Age) word uegh or weg meaning water or running water.

== Course ==
=== Wey North ===
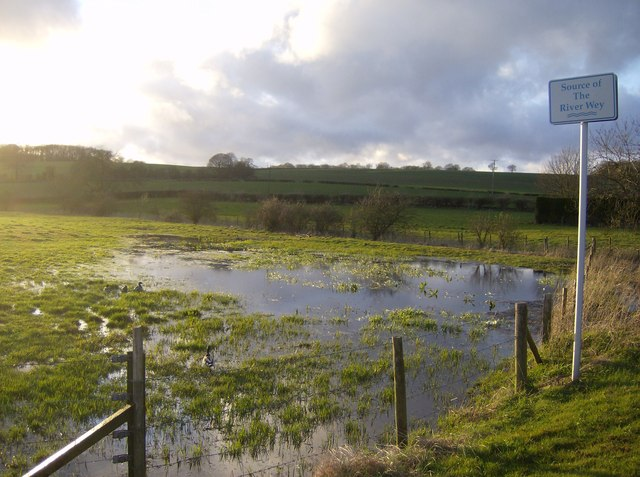
Source of the River Wey

The Wey north branch, sometimes referred to as the Alton Wey, has its official nomenclature source in Alton in Hampshire; however is exceeded by length and, in wet weather, in flow by the nearby Caker Stream rising in dendritic drainage spanning fields of Upper Farringdon and Hartley Mauditt, passing Chawton between these places. After the union in Alton the brook runs quite straight, east north-east through Upper Froyle and Bentley, turning southeast after Farnham's centre to Tilford.

The steep-sided valley accentuates entering Surrey, between vast masses termed the Lower Greensand Group (south), then down the more easterly valley on both sides (east and west). Reflecting the crumbly nature of this material which has readily eroded, the valley falls from about 230 feet (70 m) entering Surrey 1.5 miles (2.4 km) west of Farnham to 60 feet (18 m) lower at Tilford 4 miles (6.4 km) south-east of Farnham and changes from almost v-shaped to a more u-shaped alluvial plain.

The upper parts of the branch were the start of the upper River Blackwater's catchment. The Wey captured this following cumulative flooding and deposition right up to around Aldershot. A vestige of this is that the upper Blackwater valley proper, north of today's wind gap, is not lower than 226 feet (69 m) (Tongham Pool) and of very low gradient. This transported distinctive gravels containing chert, to deposit them north of the gap in the chalky ridge at Farnham. The source rocks of the gravels prove the former extent of the river. Great erosion has occurred in the Wey down to Tilford, along the sinuous, multiple-anabranch Waverley Abbey stretch, through, what Blyth notes as, the "soft strata", of that landscape.

=== Wey South ===
The Wey South branch stems from two main westward brooks, one now followed by the Portsmouth Direct Line, (Note: The branch of east Shottermill, Haslemere) the other – with longer source brooks – following the Surrey/Sussex boundary, (Note: The branch of Camelsdale, Haslemere) which combine at a point, heading west, where the line first comes as close as 318 ft (97 m) to the boundary – in the east end of a park, next to one of its three river footbridges. These brooks are fed by six main streams. The farthest are the southern streams. These drain parallel, north, narrow vales between the northerly "fingers" or "ribs" of:

- Blackdown, the third-highest hill in Southeastern England
- Ridge Hill
- Fridays Hill
- Marley Heights (formerly Moseshill), called Marley Common

The northern streams drain fingers of a single east–west ridge of Greensand, their common names, again from east to west, are:

- Wey Down (High Lane Estate)
- Inval(l)
- Stoatley Rise
- Brownscombe

Of varying size, these are long, sandy hills south-east of the upper tip of the Devil's Punch Bowl: Gibbet Hill, Hindhead. One of the northern streams adjoins strips of woodland named Weydown Common and Weycombe.

The south sources are specifically: a wood-surrounded neighbourhood, Kingsley Green (formerly Marsh) in Fernhurst; Chase Farm marking the furthest point south in Surrey; and upper fishponds at Wades Marsh marking the Fernhurst/Lurgashall boundary (both in West Sussex), next to the summit of Ridge Hill (which is the furthest source).

The Wey drains and passes Haslemere's western suburbs then Liphook, Bramshott (including Passfield), Standford and Lindford, and the large parish of Frensham. It combines with the north branch at Tilford, in which parish all three flows have large meanders.

Notable tributaries of the south branch are Cooper's Stream and the River Slea.

=== Combined river ===
From Tilford, the river runs through Elstead, Eashing, Godalming, Peasmarsh/Shalford, Guildford, Send, Old Woking, Pyrford, Byfleet, New Haw and forms the historically much more meandering border between Addlestone/Weybridge, today doing so most accurately between Hamm Court and Whittet's Ait respectively. From Godalming the river is intertwined with the Wey and Godalming Navigations. The 20 miles (32 km) of the navigations' towpath is open to pedestrians. The river joins the Thames at a cascading channel off its Navigation Canal (above Thames Lock) between Hamm Court and Whittet's Ait and a weir-fed navigation east of the ait facing the main weir stream of Shepperton Lock.

==== Tributaries ====
The River Ock joins at Godalming, Cranleigh Waters and the River Tillingbourne at Shalford and the Hoe Stream at Woking.

== History ==
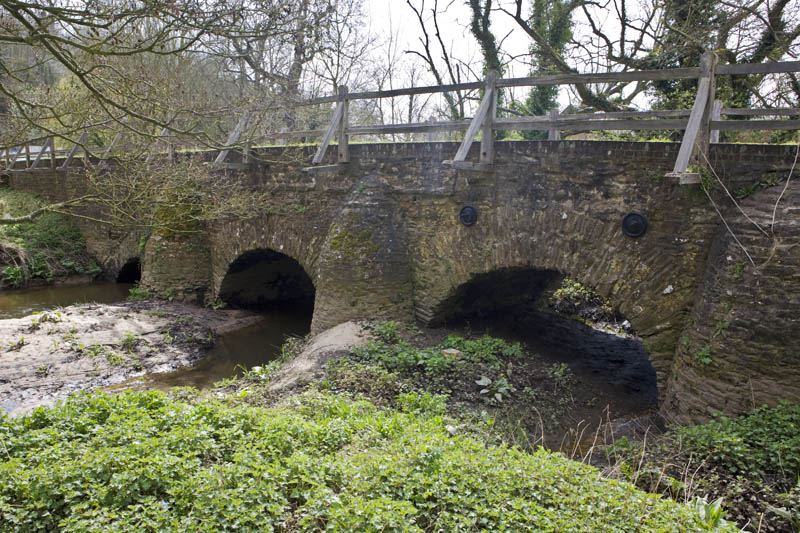
Eashing 13th-century double bridge built by Waverley Abbey monks

The river has long been used as a source of power for mills, and many are recorded in the Domesday Book. Between the 17th and 19th centuries there were over 40 mills on the river and more on its tributaries. At various times they have been used for grinding grain, fulling wool, rolling oats, crushing cattle cake, leather dressing, paper production and gunpowder manufacture. Willey Mill, at Farnham, was still in use in 1953. Headley Mill is still in commercial operation. Guildford Town Mill, though no longer used for milling, still harnesses the power of the river to generate electricity.

During the seventeenth century, the river was made navigable to Guildford and extended in the eighteenth century to Godalming. The Basingstoke Canal and Wey and Arun Junction Canal were later connected to the river. The navigable sections are now owned by the National Trust.

== Natural environment ==
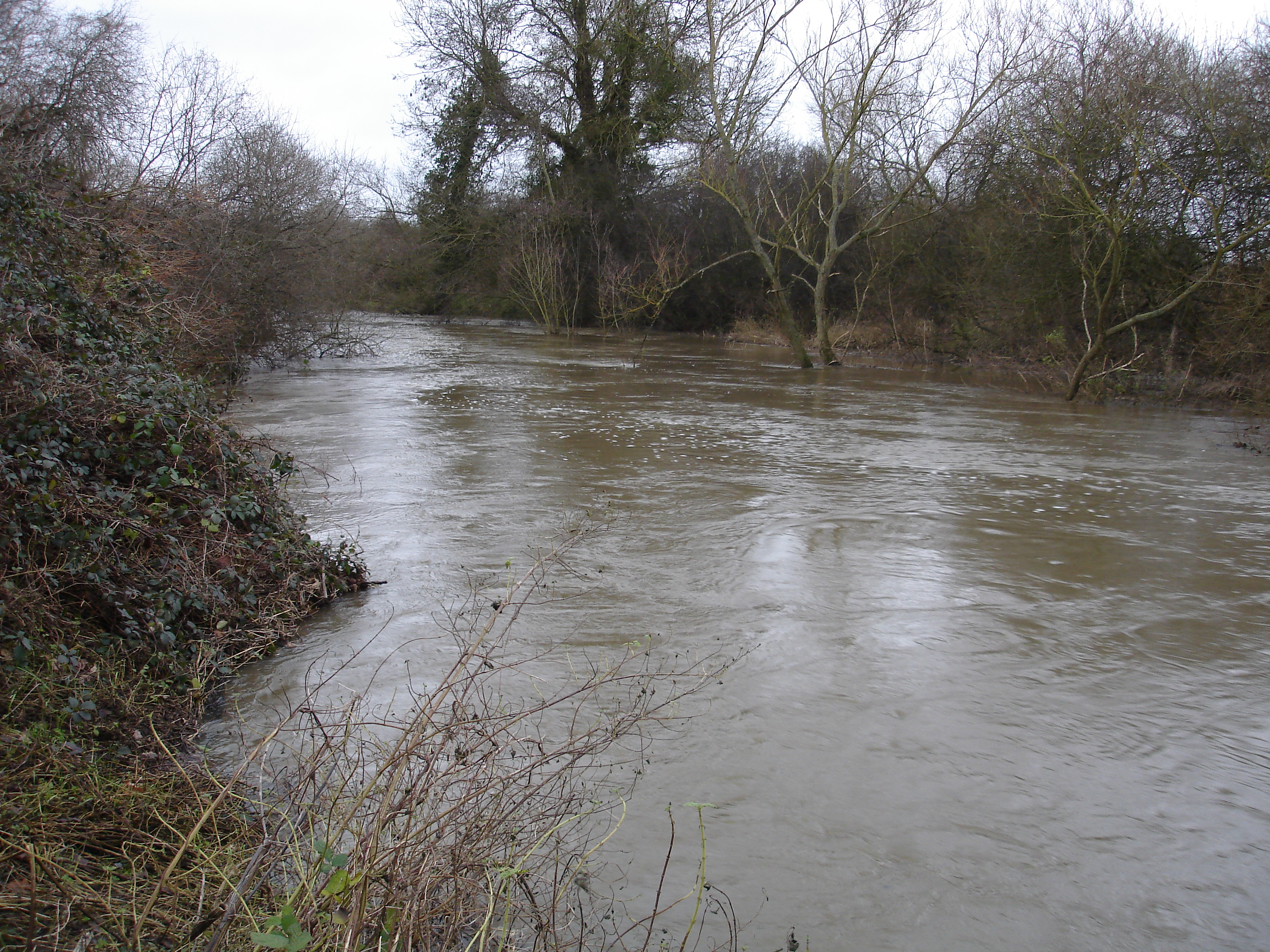
Bank-full state between Pyrford and Wisley where it is separate from the Wey Navigation

Wey Valley is a term for the narrowing basin of the River Wey before it empties into the River Thames.

Much of the upper reaches of the river are within the Surrey Hills Area of Outstanding Natural Beauty. The river passes through a variety of habitats including heathland, woodland and watermeadow, resulting in a diversity of wildlife. There are Sites of Special Scientific Interest (SSSI) and Nature Reserves along the river. In 2026, the National Trust released over 200 water voles into the North Wey.

A broad basin of aquifers drain steeply to the river so, as with the Mole, in its natural state, much of the flood plains were prone to regular flooding. This has been greatly reduced by flood alleviation measures, upstream lakes such as Frensham Great Pond and, inadvertently, the Wey navigations. The lowest urban areas of Godalming, Byfleet and Weybridge saw extensive flooding in the exceptional winter storms of 2013–14.

=== Water quality ===
The Environment Agency measure water quality of the river systems in England. Each is given an overall ecological status, which may be one of five levels: high, good, moderate, poor and bad. There are several components that are used to determine this, including biological status, which looks at the quantity and varieties of invertebrates, angiosperms and fish. Chemical status, which compares the concentrations of various chemicals against known safe concentrations, is rated good or fail.

Water quality of the River Wey in 2019:

Section	Ecological Status	Chemical Status	Overall Status	Length	Catchment	Channel
North Wey at Alton	Moderate	Fail	Moderate	2.802 km (1.741 mi)	54.231 km^{2} (20.939 sq mi)	Heavily modified
North Wey (Alton to Tilford)	Poor	Fail	Poor	31.242 km (19.413 mi)	82.531 km^{2} (31.865 sq mi)	
South Wey (Haslemere to Bordon)	Poor	Fail	Poor	17.234 km (10.709 mi)	40.382 km^{2} (15.592 sq mi)	
South Wey (Bordon to River Slea confluence)	Moderate	Fail	Moderate	5.823 km (3.618 mi)	11.342 km^{2} (4.379 sq mi)	
South Wey (River Slea confluence to Tilford)	Moderate	Fail	Moderate	11.633 km (7.228 mi)	38.999 km^{2} (15.058 sq mi)	
Wey (Tilford to Shalford)	Poor	Fail	Poor	23.332 km (14.498 mi)	63.274 km^{2} (24.430 sq mi)	
Wey (Shalford to River Thames confluence at Weybridge)	Moderate	Fail	Moderate	46.346 km (28.798 mi)	75.772 km^{2} (29.256 sq mi)	Heavily modified

== See also ==
- Tributaries of the River Thames
- Canals of the United Kingdom
- List of rivers of England
- Perseverance IV, last floating River Wey barge.
- Mills on the River Wey and its tributaries

== Notes and references ==
Notes

Next confluence upstream	River Thames	Next confluence downstream
Wey and Godalming Navigations (south)	River Wey	River Ash (north)
