= River Slea, Hampshire =

River in Hampshire, England

River Slea
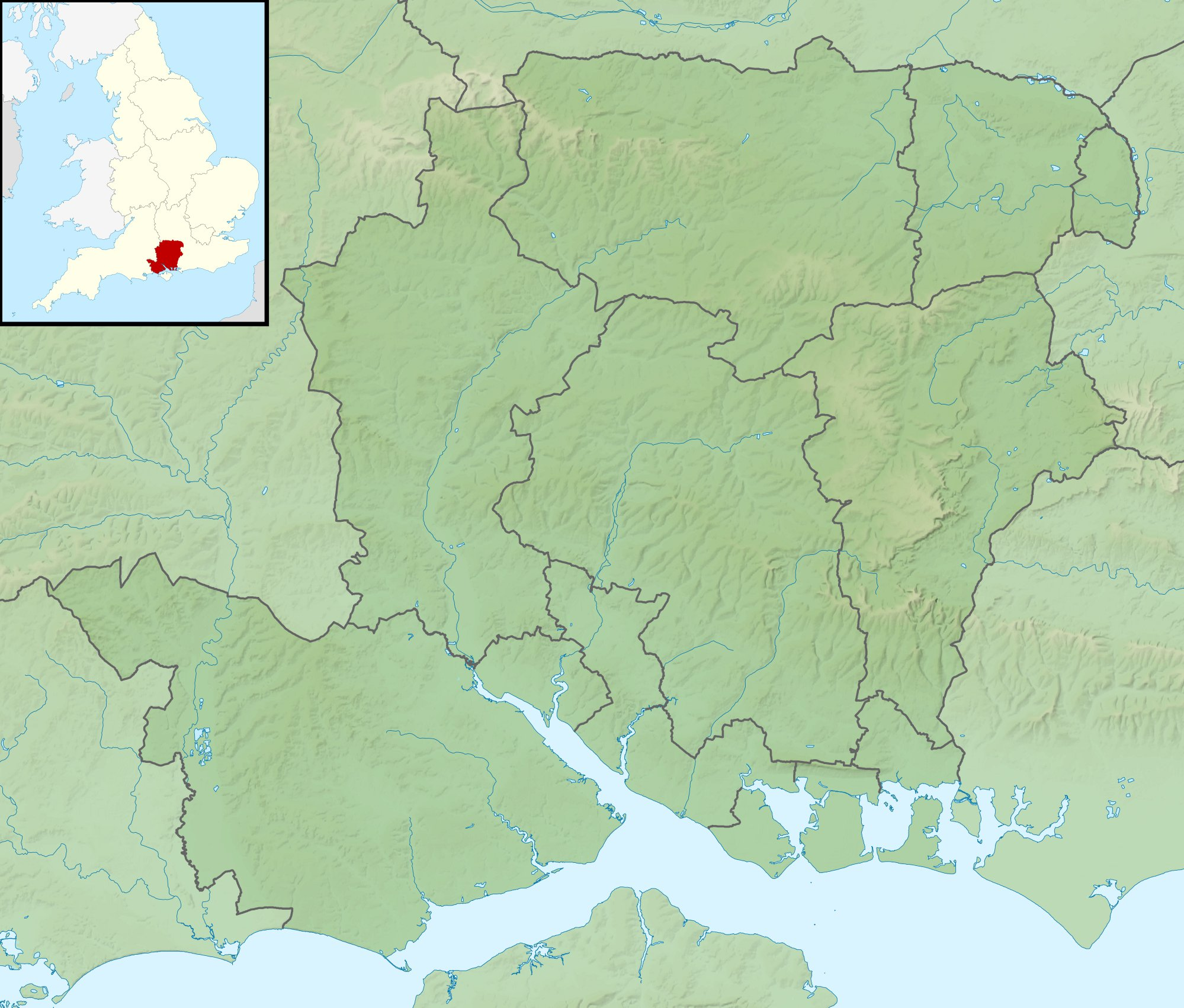
- The small central watercourse is the Slea/Oxney Stream, much larger to the north is the Wey (north branch)

Location
- Country: England
- County: Hampshire
- District: East Hampshire
- Towns: Sleaford, Bordon

Physical characteristics
- Source: Kingsley Stream
  - location: Kingsley Mill, Kingsley
  - coordinates: 51.1325°N 0.8811°W
  - elevation: 72m
- 2nd source: Oakhanger Stream
- Mouth: River Wey
  - location: North of Brockford Bridge, far north fields of parish of Headley, Hampshire
  - coordinates: 51°08′31″N 0°49′52″W
  - elevation: 62m
- Length: 6.2 km (3.9 mi)

Basin features
- Progression: Oxney Stream, River Slea, Wey (south branch), Wey, Thames, North Sea
- River system: Wey catchment
- Tributaries
  - right: Oxney Moss

The River Slea is a tributary of the south branch of the River Wey in Hampshire.

== Course ==
The river flows east from the confluence of the Kingsley and the longer Oakhanger streams at Kingsley Mill, through the village of Sleaford until it meets the Wey just north of Brockford Bridge. The section between Kingsley Mill and Sleaford is also known as the Oxney Stream.

The Slea's main tributary is the Oxney Moss which rises on the west side of Bordon and joins at Sleaford.

== Water quality ==
The Environment Agency measure water quality of the river systems in England. Each is given an overall ecological status, which may be one of five levels: high, good, moderate, poor and bad. There are several components that are used to determine this, including biological status, which looks at the quantity and varieties of invertebrates, angiosperms and fish. Chemical status, which compares the concentrations of various chemicals against known safe concentrations, is rated good or fail.

Water quality of the River Slea in 2019:

| Section | Ecological Status | Chemical Status | Overall Status | Length | Catchment | Channel |
|---|---|---|---|---|---|---|
| Slea (Kingsley to Sleaford) | Moderate | Fail | Moderate | 6.79 km (4.22 mi) | 31.326 km^{2} (12.095 sq mi) | |
