= Mills on the River Wey and its tributaries =

Watermills on the Wey in England

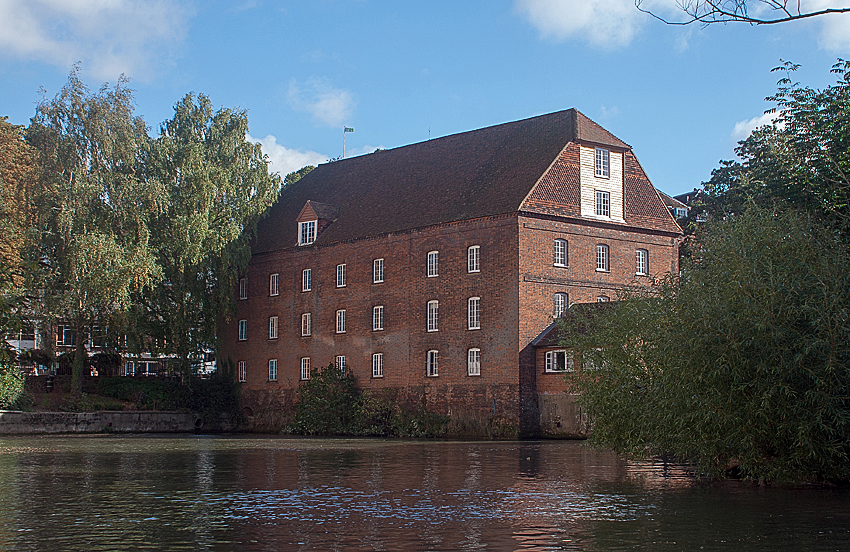
Town Mill, Guildford

Many watermills lined the banks of the River Wey, England, from the 17th century, due to the river's ability to provide a reliable, year-round flow of water. These mills chiefly ground wheat, often referred to as corn, for flour and oats for animal feed though many were used in the production of other goods such as paper, cloth, leather, wire and gunpowder. The river was home to more mills per mile than anywhere else in Great Britain. The mill situated at Coxes Lock near Addlestone, Surrey, is the largest. There are many mills on the river's principal tributaries, such as the Tillingbourne and the Ock, as well as mills on the Whitmore Vale stream, Cranleigh Waters and Hodge Brook. The last commercial mill on the Tillingbourne, Botting's Mill at Albury, closed in 1991. Headley Water Mill, on the Wey South branch is still in business. Town Mill, Guildford still has a water turbine driven generator producing electricity for the town.

Note: The mills are listed from source to mouth for each waterway.

== Wey (North branch) mills ==
Orps Mill, Alton

National Grid Reference: SU 72111 39281. A fulling mill dating back to about the 15th century. The name is thought to come from an early owner, Thomas Thorpe. It became a dwelling by 1720 and later was converted into a number of cottages. They were demolished when the Watercress Line was extended from Alton to Winchester.

King's Mill, Alton

National Grid Reference: SU 72331 39564 Also known as Hyde Mill and Spittle Mill as it was part of the manor of Hyde Abbey before the dissolution of the monasteries. Initially a corn mill, a paper mill was established alongside, which became known as King's Mill after the tenant, William King, who established the King's Pond, around 1780, to provide reliable year-round source of water. It later became known as Spicers Mill after a later owner. The mill finally closed in 1909, after which it was used as industrial premises before being destroyed by fire in 1985.

Anstey Mill, Alton

National Grid Reference: SU 72903 39981. Ruined but with the wheel still in place. It is a Grade II listed building.

Upper Neatham Mill, Holybourne

National Grid Reference: SU 73344 40537. A corn mill formerly belonging to Waverley Abbey. It burnt down in 1934. No trace remains.

Lower Neatham Mill, Alton

National Grid Reference: SU 73966 40750. Originally a fulling mill but later converted to a corn mill. Now a private dwelling. It is a Grade II listed building.

Wyck Mill, Froyle

National Grid Reference: SU 755 417. Fulling mill, later known as Mill Court Mill. No trace remains.

Froyle Mill

National Grid Reference: SU 76837 42778. Fulling mill, no trace remains. The site is now occupied by a residential development.

Isington Mill, Binstead

National Grid Reference: SU 77471 42805. Now a private dwelling, the former home of General Montgomery. It is a Grade II listed building.

Bentley Mill

National Grid Reference: SU 80219 44241. Also known as Groveland Mill, or Turk's Farm Mill, it was built in 1640 as a paper mill, but was a fulling mill and a corn mill for some time. The machinery was dismantled around 1915 and the mill was demolished in 1917. The mill house survives and is now a Grade II listed building.

Willey Mill, Farnham

National Grid Reference: SU 81679 45162. A Domesday site and a Grade II listed building.

Weydon Mill

National Grid Reference: SU 836 462. Also known as La Medmulle. Ceased milling in 1909 and the mill was demolished in 1919. During the demolition, an English Civil War era cannon ball was found embedded in one of the walls. Now a ruin.

Hatch Mill, Farnham

National Grid Reference: SU 84627 47054. Also known as Grovelands Mill. Shown on the 1871 Ordnance Survey map as Woodmeadhatch Mill. After milling ceased it became the Farnham Sanitary Laundry. It was then occupied by the West Surrey College of Art and Design and by 2018 was a residential care home. It is a Grade II listed building.

High Mill, Farnham

National Grid Reference: SU 85742 47192. A corn mill until 1900, it then switched to producing animal feed until its closure in 1950. It is a Grade II listed building.

Waverley Mill

National Grid Reference: SU 871 455. Part of the Abbey estate, it was demolished in 1900. No trace of it remains.

Tilford Mill

National Grid Reference: SU 8678 4437. Also known as Wanford Mill. The brick footings and the remnants of the mill race are all that remains.

=== Nadder Stream mills ===
Bourne Mill, Farnham

National Grid Reference: SU 85233 47429. Dating to the 17th century, the remaining part of the mill now houses a manufacturing and retail business. It is a Grade II listed building.

Little Bourne Mill, Farnham

National Grid Reference: SU 85240 47345 A small corn mill fed by the tail race of Bourne Mill. It had ceased operations by the time the railway was built in 1849 and destroyed in a fire some time later.

Rock Mill, Farnham

National Grid Reference: SU 85714 47333. A corn mill built around 1770 and situated on a stream from Badshot Lea. It ceased operating in 1877, by which time the waterwheel was supplemented by a 10HP Corliss steam engine. A large mill in its time, only the foundations remain.

== Wey (South branch) mills ==
Lowder Mill, Fernhurst

National Grid Reference: SU 89976 31682. Dated to about 1729, it appears to have ceased working by 1881. Now a private dwelling. It is a Grade II listed building.

Sickle Mill, Shottermill

National Grid Reference: SU 88754 32538. Originally a paper mill built alongside an earlier hammer mill used by a firm of sickle makers, hence the name. An 1895 map shows the mill being used for the production of candle wicks and cord. By the 1920s it had ceased to function and was acquired by the Haslemere Urban District Council and used for various purposes. In 1997 the remaining parts were converted to private housing. It is a Grade II listed building.

Shotter Mill, Shottermill

National Grid Reference: SU 88299 32487. Originally a fulling mill, later a corn mill. It gave its name to the hamlet that grew up around it, now a suburb of Haslemere. It is a Grade II listed building.

New Mill, Shottermill

National Grid Reference: SU 885 324. A skin mill or tannery, later a paper mill. It ceased operation in 1903 and became derelict, finally being demolished in 1978. No visible trace of the mill remains.

Pitfold Mill, Shottermill

National Grid Reference: SU 881 326. Skin mill or tannery. It was later used as a saw mill, with its own narrow gauge railway. The mill was demolished and the site redeveloped in the 1980s.

Pophole Mill

National Grid Reference: SU 874 326. One of the oldest mill sites on the Wey, being mentioned in 1200. By 1573 it was a hammer mill with forge and furnace. By 1777 it had ceased operating. No trace now remains.

Bramshott Corn Mill

National Grid Reference: SU 837 332.

Bramshott Mill

National Grid Reference: SU 818 344. Also known as Passfield Mill. Originally a hammer mill, then a paper mill.

Standford Mill

National Grid Reference: SU 813 349. A paper mill built in 1830, now a private dwelling.

Headley Mill

National Grid Reference: SU 81203 35723. A corn mill still in commercial operation. It is a Grade II listed Building.

Headley Park Mill

National Grid Reference: SU 8177 3814. An unusual hexagonal shaped corn mill that operated until the 1890s. In 1904 it was fitted with a dynamo to provide electricity to Headley Park House. A fire in the 1960s left the building derelict.

Frensham Mill

National Grid Reference: SU 837 410. A corn mill built in 1876 to replace an earlier mill on the site. It was demolished in 1922.

=== River Slea mills ===
Old Mill, Selborne

National Grid Reference: SU 74447 33529. A corn mill on the Oakhanger Stream. Now converted to a private dwelling, it is a Grade II listed building.

Dorton Mill, Selborne

National Grid Reference: SU 750 343. A corn mill on the Oakhanger Stream.

Kingsley Mill

National Grid Reference: SU 78412 37673. A corn mill situated at the confluence of the Kingsley and Oakhanger Streams. Along with the adjacent mill house it has been converted to a private dwelling. It is a Grade II listed building.

=== Whitmore Vale Stream mills ===
Barford Upper Mill

National Grid Reference: SU 85389 37791. Originally a paper mill and later a flock mill, it is now a private dwelling. It is a Grade II listed building.

Barford Middle Mill

National Grid Reference: SU 854 379. A corn mill. Demolished and replaced by a private dwelling.

Barford Lower Mill

National Grid Reference: SU 853 380. Also known as the Old Mill, Churt. A paper mill, then a flock mill, dating from about 1800–1835. It closed in 1884 and was subsequently demolished. Parts of the building are incorporated into a modern house.

== Wey River mills ==
Elstead Mill
National Grid Reference: SU 90356 43832. Corn mill, later used by a company producing worsted braid. It was used as a hospital in World War I. In the late twentieth century it started use as a pub. It is a Grade II* listed building.

Cutt Mill
National Grid Reference: SU 914 456. In the grounds of Cutt Mill House, little remains of the mill, which ceased working in the 1930s.

Cosford Mill, Thursley
National Grid Reference: SU 91358 39606. Built about 1580. The first recorded owner was Richard Shudd in 1536. Now converted to a domestic accommodation, it is a Grade II listed building.

Silk Mill, Thursley
National Grid Reference: SU 919 409. Operating between 1794 and 1849, it was demolished by 1871.

Eashing Mill
National Grid Reference: SU 946 438. Both a paper mill and corn mill until 1835, after which it was used solely for papermaking. The wheel was replaced by a water turbine in the late 19th century. It is now used for light engineering.

Salgasson Mill
National Grid Reference: SU 965 442. Originally a corn mill, later used as a fibre mill and tannery. The building has been completely demolished.

Westbrook Mill
National Grid Reference: SU 966 442. Former tannery, fulling mill, and paper mill. In 1881 the waterwheel was used to drive a Siemans generator making Godalming the first town in Britain to be lit by electricity.

Catteshall Mill
National Grid Reference: SU 983 443. Originally a paper mill, later a fulling mill, corn mill, and foundry. In 1869 the wheel was replaced by a Fourneyron water turbine, thought to be the largest ever produced. Catteshall was the last working mill in Godalming, surviving until the 1970s. When part of the mill was demolished in 1981 the turbine was rescued for possible future display.

Unstead Mill
National Grid Reference: SU 991 460. A roller corn mill alongside Unstead Lock, it ceased operation in 1906 and was subsequently completely demolished.

Town Mill, Guildford

National Grid Reference: SU 99596 49263. 18th century mill used for corn and pumping water. It is Grade II listed.

Artington Mill
National Grid Reference: SU 994 493. A corn mill that ceased operation in the late 17th century. Situated on the west bank of the river, just upstream of Guildford Bridge. The site is now occupied by a pub. The course of the mill stream is now Millmead Road.

Stoke Mill

National Grid Reference: SU 998 510. 19th-century corn mill now used as offices.

Bower's Mill, Burpham
National Grid Reference: TQ 001 529. A paper mill was on this site in 1733 and a corn mill added around 1879. After paper making ceased it became a corn mill and later it was used to produce linseed oil. All milling ceased by 1910 and the mill was demolished in 1945. The building currently on the site, known as Bowers Mill, was built as a laundry for Sutton Place by the Duke of Sutherland.

Gresham Mill, Old Woking
National Grid Reference: TQ 015 564. Also known as Woking Mill, it was a paper mill and printing works, now converted into private apartments.

Newark Mill
National Grid Reference: TQ 040 574. A mid-17th-century corn mill, it was used as a paper mill between 1855 and 1859. It closed in 1943 after being bombed in an air raid. It was destroyed by fire in 1966.

Byfleet Mill
National Grid Reference: TQ 07288 60684. An early 19th-century corn mill. It ceased working in 1950 and the machinery was scrapped. The mill building has been restored and is now a Grade II* listed building.

Coxes Lock Mills

National Grid Reference: TQ 061 641. The original mill was built in 1776 for working iron. Replaced by a corn and silk mill in 1829, part of which is still extant. This was, in turn, replaced with a large corn mill in 1900 which ground flour for Allied Mills until 1983. The latter has been converted to private dwellings. The two mill buildings are now Grade II listed.

Liberty Mill
National Grid Reference: TQ063 646 A sawmill built in 1843. It drew water from the navigation and discharged it into the Bourne Stream. It continued working well into the 20th century. At one time the Airscrew Company made wooden propellers here and later Weyroc used it for the manufacture of chipboard. The site is now a small industrial estate.

Ham Haw Mill
National Grid Reference: TQ 072 654. Also known as Whittets Mill. Originally a paper mill built in 1691. It was used as a corn mill until 1817 when it ceased to operate. From 1842 it was used as a linseed oil mill with a second wheel added. The mill was in operation until the 1960s when it was largely destroyed by fire. No trace of the mill remains. The site is now occupied by a residential development.

=== River Ock mills ===
Enton Mill

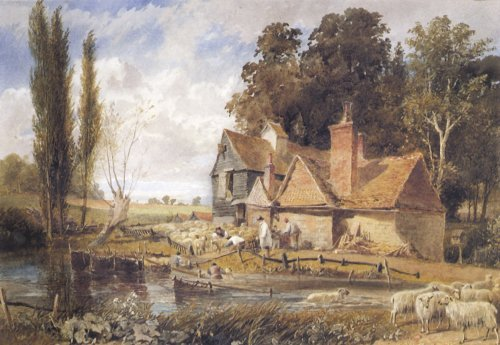
Sheep washing - Enton Mill Surrey

National Grid Reference: SU 950 400. A corn mill built c.1621. It is now a private dwelling and incorporates the mast of a 19th-century tea clipper as the newel post of a spiral staircase. The mill features in a painting, Sheep Washing, by the 19th century artist, William Hull. It a Grade II listed building.

Rake Mill, Witley

National Grid Reference: SU 951 412. Originally a fulling mill dating from 1577. The mill was used by the artist Neville Lytton as a studio, but it, along with the bulk of Lytton's sketches and paintings, was destroyed by a fire in 1902.

Ockford Mill

National Grid Reference: SU 962 433. A 19th-century corn mill, it ceased working in 1934. It is currently used as a light industrial unit.

Hatch Mill, Godalming

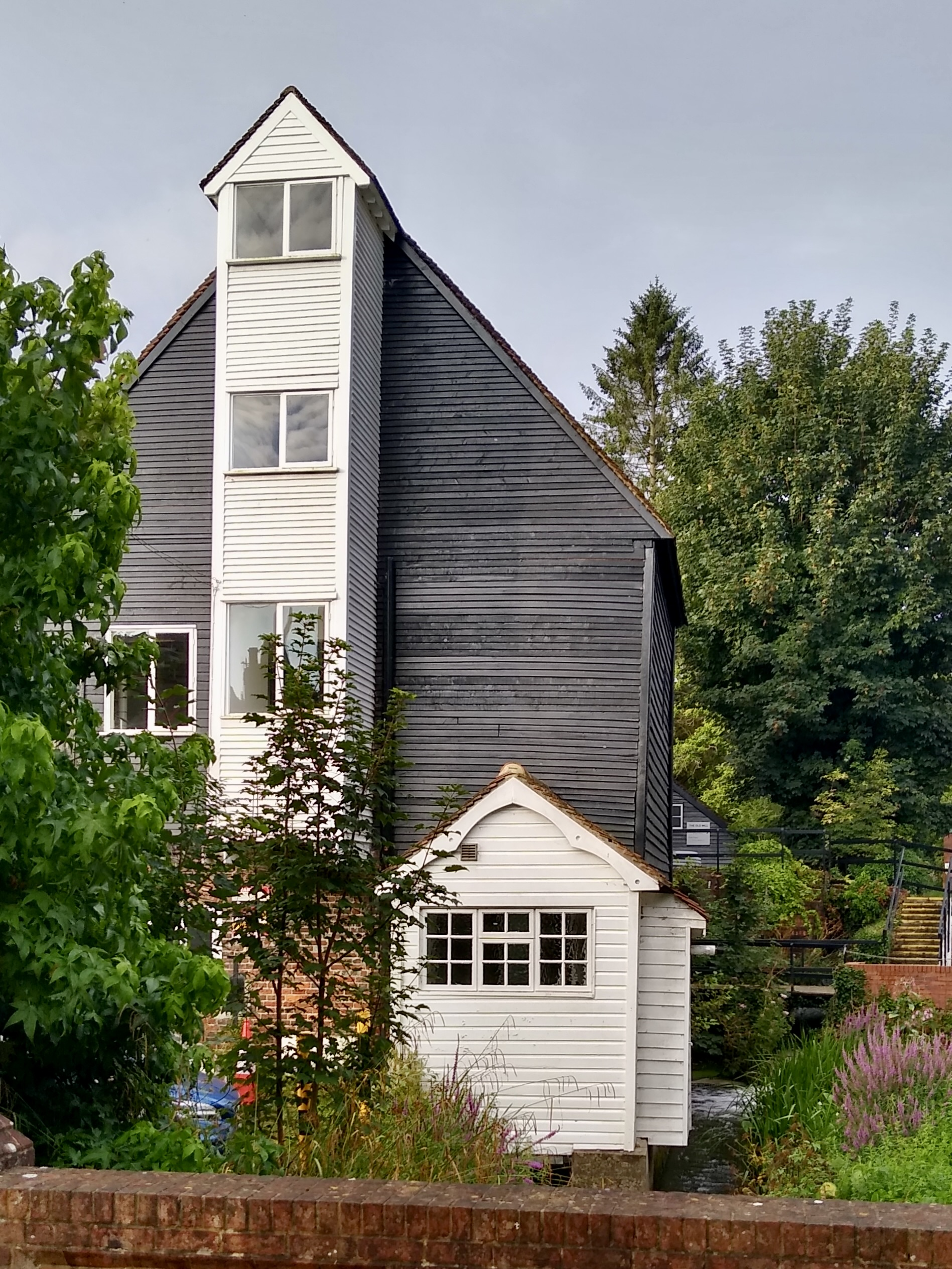
Hatch Mill, Godalming

National Grid Reference: SU 966 438. A flour mill. Sections of the building date back to the 17th century. It ceased milling in 1950 but continued in use as a warehouse. Now known as the Old Mill, it houses a light industrial firm.

Mill Lane leather mill

National Grid Reference: SU 966 439. A 17th-century mill serving the tanneries of Godalming. It burnt down twice in the 19th century but survived in use until it finally closed in 1953.

=== Cranleigh Waters mills ===
Cranleigh Mill
National Grid Reference: TQ 04745 39601. A corn mill dating, in parts, to the 16th-century. It is a Grade II listed building.

Upper Lostiford Mill
National Grid Reference: TQ 037 451 On a small stream, known as Darbyn's Brook. A fulling mill and oil leather factory involved in the production of chamois and other leathers. It operated from 1845 to 1899 when it was acquired by a member of the Courage brewing family and subsequently demolished.

Wonersh Mill
National Grid Reference: TQ 022 446. Also on Darbyn's Brook. An 18th-century corn mill, it was modernized in 1885 with a water turbine replacing the wheel. It ceased milling in 1910 and is now used as storage. It is Grade II listed.

Hascombe Mill
National Grid Reference: TQ 000 400. Dating back to 1690, the mill ceased working in the late 1890s. Only a few ruins remain.

Snowdenham Mill
National Grid Reference: TQ001 441. Built around 1792, it was a corn mill and later a feed mill. Now abandoned but with its machinery still in situ. It was proposed as a candidate for restoration in 1979, but permission was not obtained and the building continues to deteriorate.

Bramley Mill
National Grid Reference: TQ 006 447. A 17th-century corn mill on the site of an earlier fulling mill. Ceased working in 1931 and converted to domestic accommodation in 1935.

=== Tillingbourne mills ===
The Tillingbourne is the main tributary of the Wey and 24 mill sites have been identified along its course.

I do not remember to have seen such Variety of Mills and Works upon so narrow a Brook, and in so little a compass, there being Mills for Corn, Cloth, Brass, Iron, Powder etc.

— John Evelyn, 1676.

Brookmill
National Grid Reference: TQ 13978 45148. Established in the 16th century, possibly as a gunpowder mill

Friday Street Upper Mill
National Grid Reference: TQ 127 450. On the Friday Street stream tributary.

Friday Street Mill
National Grid Reference: TQ 12790 45804. On the Friday Street Stream tributary. Both corn and malt mills existed here from about 1579 until closed in 1736. There is speculation that it may have also been used for iron working.

Wotton House Mill
National Grid Reference: TQ 11885 46946 No trace remains.

Crane's Mill
National Grid Reference: TQ 110 471. Also called Abinger Mill.

Paddington Mill
National Grid Reference: TQ 100 472. A corn mill until 1915, it was subsequently used as a watercress store. Converted to private housing by 2017 at latest.

Abinger Hammer Mill
National Grid Reference: TQ 097 474. A hammer mill constructed by 1557 on the site of an earlier corn mill. Production ceased in 1787 and, despite attempts to establish a gunpowder mill on the site, the mill fell out of use.

Sutton Mill
National Grid Reference: TQ 10143 46105. On the Holbury St Mary Stream tributary. Possibly a 14th-century fulling mill and corn mill.

Gomshall Mill
National Grid Reference: TQ 085 478. A corn mill that ceased milling in 1953. In 1964 it was converted into a pub and restaurant. The machinery is still in situ having been refurbished and forms a "feature" of the bar.

Gomshall Tannery
National Grid Reference: TQ 083 479. Still in operation into the 1980s. Destroyed by fire in 1992.

Netley Mill
National Grid Reference: TQ 079 479. Also known as Shere Mill, it operated as a corn mill until 1907. It was used as a pumping station from 1970. Since converted to private accommodation.

Shere Lower Mill
National Grid Reference: TQ 076 479. No trace remains.

Shere West Mill
National Grid Reference: TQ 066 477. A corn mill.

Albury Park Mill
National Grid Reference: TQ 062 479. Originally a corn mill, it was converted to a paper mill in 1793. It ceased working by 1810 and was then used as a laundry.

Albury Mill
National Grid Reference: TQ 05206 47933. A medieval corn mill that was burnt down in an arson attack in 1830. The arsonist was executed for the attempted murder of the miller. Rebuilt in brick and fitted with water turbines to provide power to Albury Park. It has recently been converted for use as offices and private accommodation.

Postford Upper Mill
National Grid Reference: TQ 039 479. Built in 1809 as a paper mill producing paper for bank-notes. Closed by 1875.

Postford Lower Mill
National Grid Reference: TQ 039480. Built in 1809 as a paper mill producing paper for bank-notes. After paper production ceased in the 1870s it was converted for use as a corn mill. it was renamed Albury Mill in the 20th Century. Also known as Bottings Mill, after its last owners. The last working commercial mill on the river, it ceased milling in 1991. It was demolished in 1996 and the site redeveloped.

Postford House Mill
National Grid Reference: TQ039 477. Built in the 1830s after the conversion of the upper and lower mills to paper making. Closed in 1865.

Chilworth Gunpowder Mills
National Grid References: TQ 02899 47519, TQ 03509 47900. The gunpowder mills were originally developed by the East India Company from 1625. Divided between the Lower, Middle and Upper Works, it was a complex of up to 14 mills, later including steam-powered mills, and continued in use until 1920. The site of the middle and upper works is now a scheduled monument administered by Guildford Borough Council.

In 1677, a survey by Sir Jonas Moore established the existence of the following individual mills:

- Lower Works: Chilworth Mill, Copps Mill, coal and brimstone mill, Wood Pile Mill, Dust Mill, Doubling Mill, Chattering Mill and Shifford Mill. (Note: probably a misspelling of Shalford)
- Middle Works: Lower Mill, Cole and Brimstone Mill, Midle Mill (sic), Randill's Mill, and the Upper Mill.
- Upper Works:Twist Mill, Lower Mill, 1st parson's mill, 2nd parson's mill, 3rd parson's mill (Note: the 3 mills stood on the parson of Albury's land) and the Upper Mill.

Chilworth Great Mill
National Grid Reference: TQ 025 475. Built as a paper mill producing paper for bank-notes. Ceased production and closed in the 1870s.

Chilworth Little Mill
Built as a paper mill producing paper for bank-notes. Ceased production and closed in the 1870s.

East Shalford Mill
National Grid Reference: TQ015 474.

Shalford Mill

National Grid Reference: TQ 00106 47635. A corn mill and grist mill, listed Grade II*, It finally ceased production in 1914. It was rescued from dereliction by Ferguson's Gang in 1932 and donated to the National Trust.

=== Hodge Brook mills ===
Pirbright Mill
National Grid Reference: SU 942 554. A corn mill and timber mill from the early 19th century. Now converted to a private dwelling but with much of the machinery still in situ.

Heath Mill, Worplesdon
National Grid Reference: SU 960 549. Built in 1902 to replace an earlier mill destroyed by fire. Now a private dwelling.

Rickford's Mill, Worplesdon
National Grid Reference: SU 965 546. An 18th century corn mill now converted to a private dwelling.

=== East Clandon Stream mills ===
Ockham Mill
National Grid Reference: TQ 056 579. Built in 1862 to replace a previous mill destroyed by fire. The building is in the style of those owned by the Earl of Lovelace and is a Grade II listed building. It ceased milling in 1927 and remained derelict until 1958 when it was converted into a private dwelling. The owner has subsequently had the machinery professionally restored.

Clandon Mill
National Grid Reference: TQ 040 519. No trace remains.

== See also ==
- Watermill for the different types of mill and their uses.
- Hammer mill
- Fulling mill
- Corn, grist and feed mills
- List of watermills in the United Kingdom
