= Headley Water Mill =

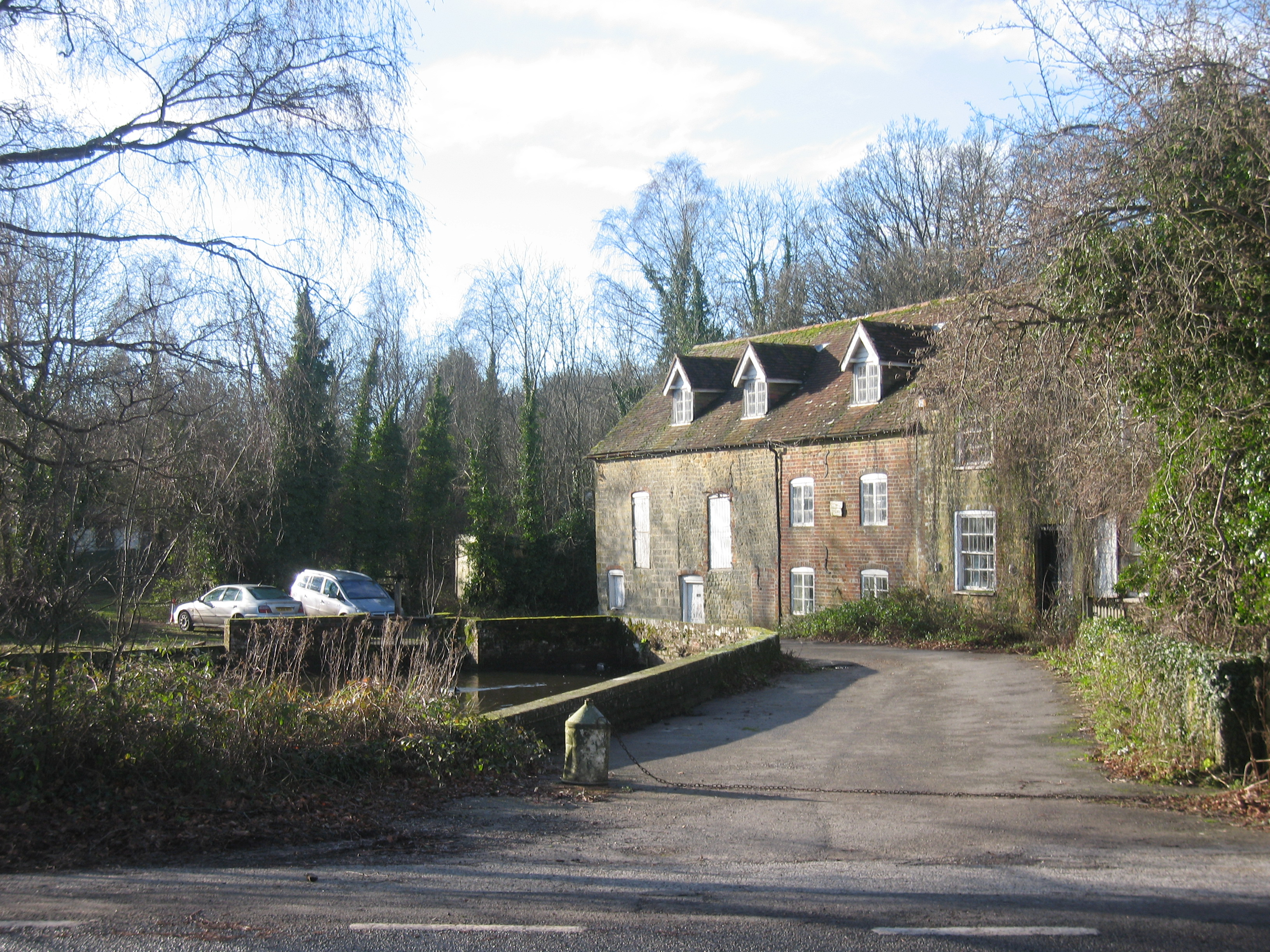
- Headley Mill

- Location within Hampshire
- 51°06′54″N 0°50′29″W
- Type: Watermill
- Location: Headley
- OS grid reference: SU 81203 35723

History
- Built: 16th century

Site notes
- Area: Hampshire

Listed Building – Grade II
- Official name: Headley mill and adjoining house
- Designated: 15 August 1985
- Reference no.: 1093994

Headley Water Mill is a water mill used for the milling of flour and situated near the village of Headley on the outskirts of the village of Lindford in the east of the English county of Hampshire. It is likely that there was a mill on this site in 1086 at the time of the Domesday Book. The west end of the current mill is considered to date from the 16th Century, whilst the central section is older. The mill is powered by the south branch of upper reaches of the River Wey and is the last commercially productive water mill in Hampshire. The mill with its adjoining house is a Grade II listed building.

The mill has four pairs of stones, three for grinding flour and one for grinding barley or oats for animal feed. Two pairs of stones can be driven by the breast shot wheel at any one time.

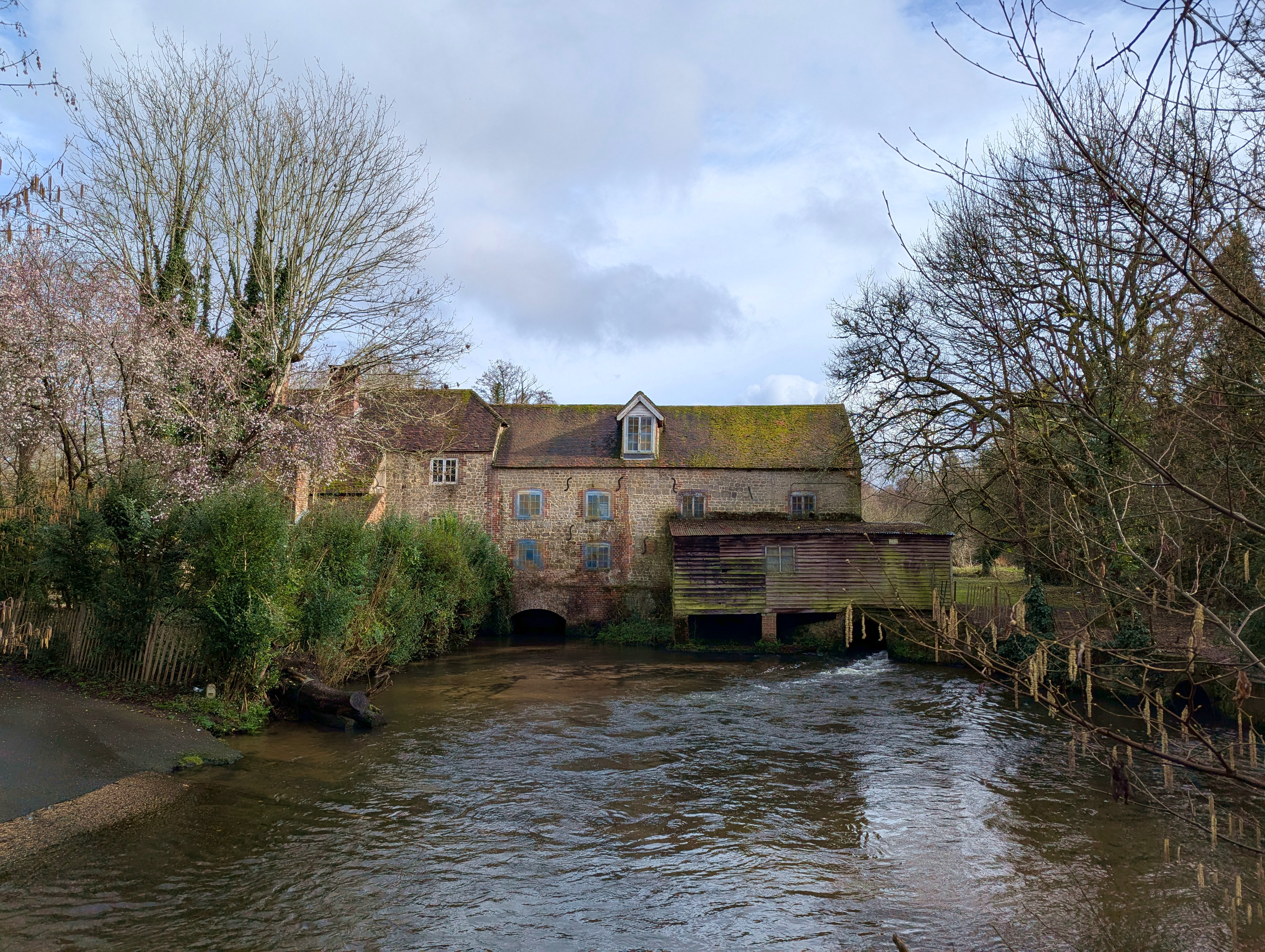
The mill from the footbridge beside the ford over the River Wey.

== See also ==
- List of watermills in the United Kingdom
- Mills on the River Wey and its tributaries
