= Arford =

Village in Hampshire, England

Coordinates: 51°07′28″N 0°48′40″W

- Hamlet
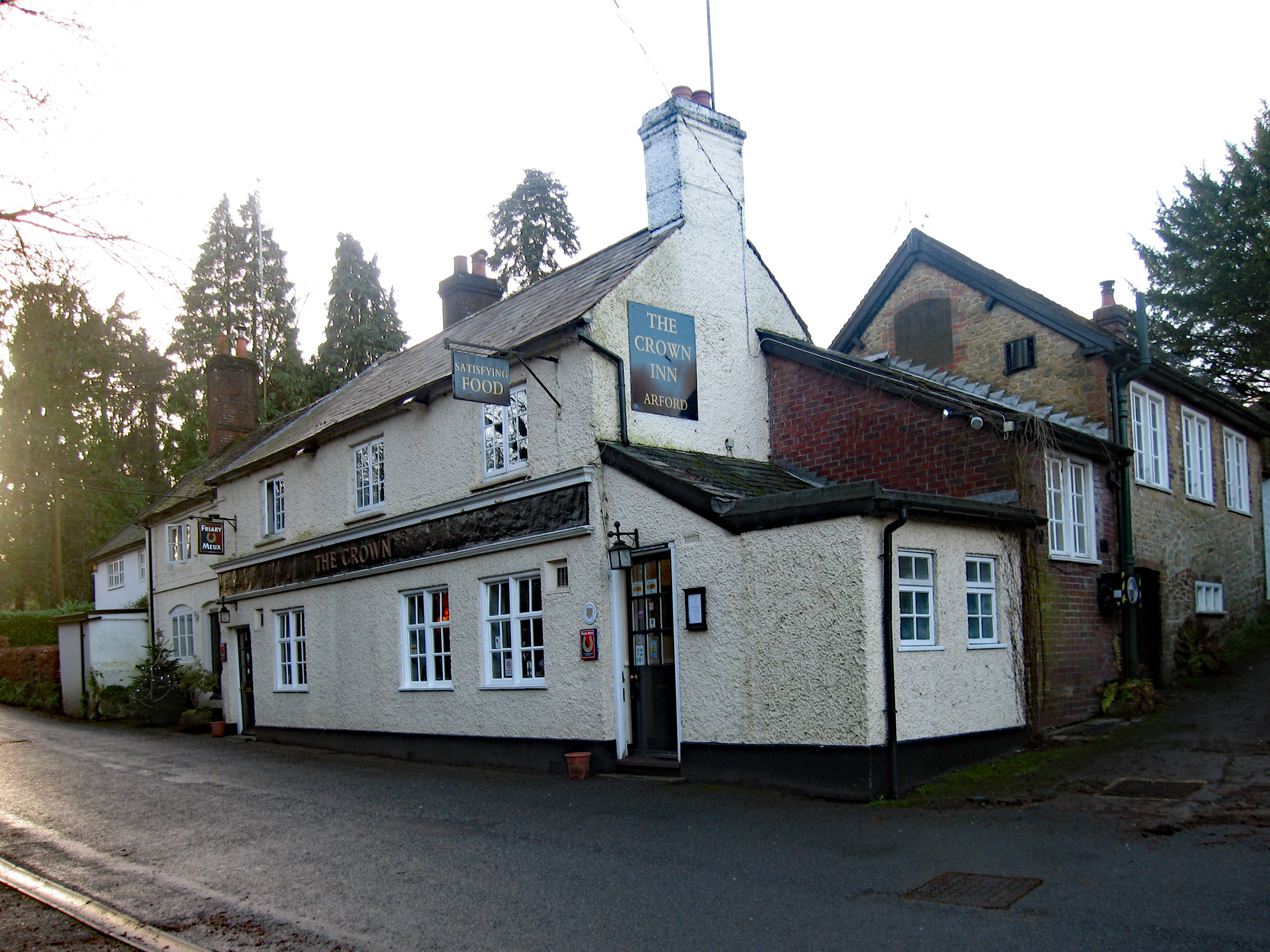
- The Crown at Arford

- Location within Hampshire
- OS grid reference: SU832637
- Civil parish: Headley
- District: East Hampshire
- Shire county: Hampshire
- Region: South East
- Country: England
- Sovereign state: United Kingdom
- Post town: BORDON
- Postcode district: GU35
- Dialling code: 01428
- Police: Hampshire and Isle of Wight
- Fire: Hampshire and Isle of Wight
- Ambulance: South Central
- UK Parliament: East Hampshire

Arford is a hamlet in the East Hampshire district of Hampshire, England, just north of the B3002 road, and is part of the civil parish of Headley. It was designated a conservation area in 1977, the area was extended in 1993.

The hamlet is about half a mile from Headley village centre and 3.5 miles (5.6 km) north of Liphook, which has the nearest railway station. It is set in a tree lined valley on a tributary of the River Wey.

Arford House is an early 19th century Grade II listed building, as is the adjacent Arford Lodge. There are two pubs in the hamlet, The Crown and The Wheatsheaf.

== In popular culture ==
Fleetwood Mac wrote a song about the Crown: "Down at the Crown"
