= Barford, Hampshire =

Village in Hampshire, England

Coordinates: 51.128953°N 0.782433°W

Barford
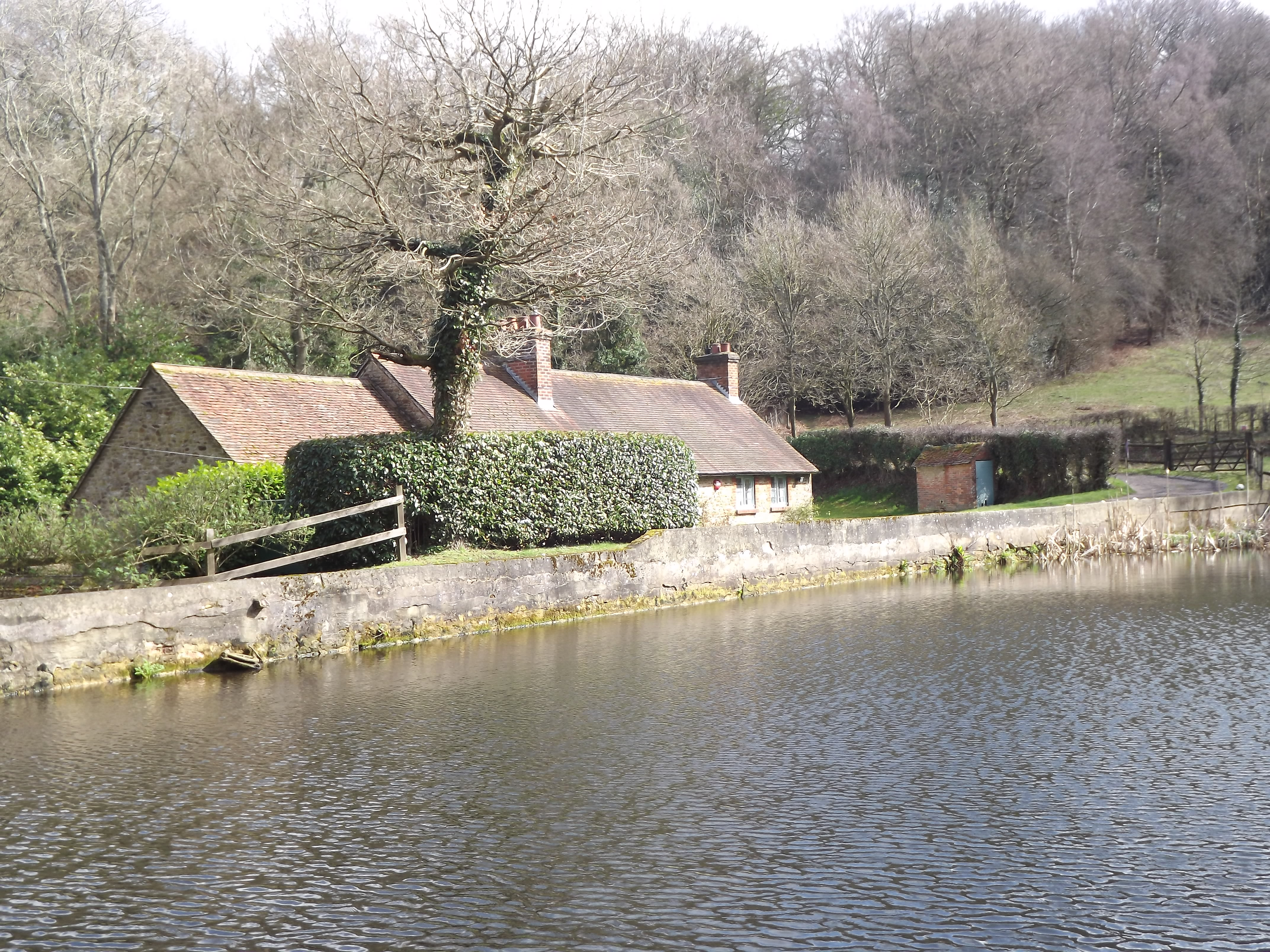
- Mill Pond Dam

- Location within Hampshire
- OS grid reference: SU8529737335
- Civil parish: Headley
- District: East Hampshire
- Shire county: Hampshire
- Region: South East
- Country: England
- Sovereign state: United Kingdom
- Post town: GUILDFORD
- Postcode district: GU26 6
- Dialling code: 01428
- Police: Hampshire and Isle of Wight
- Fire: Hampshire and Isle of Wight
- Ambulance: South Central
- UK Parliament: East Hampshire

Barford is a scattered hamlet in the civil parish of Headley in the East Hampshire district of Hampshire, England. The village lies on the Hampshire-Surrey border, approximately 2 miles (3.2 km) from Hindhead. Its nearest town is Bordon, which lies approximately 3.6 miles (5.8 km) south-west from the village.

The stream which marks the parish and county boundary once had three mills, all now private dwellings. Two were involved in paper-making, and one corn-grinding. The oldest is mentioned in a pipe-roll of 1264 while the others date from the 18th century. One of the paper mills was subsequently used for flock, and one housed French prisoners of war during the Napoleonic Wars.

Barford bridge, formerly a dangerous ford, was built across the stream in the early 1900s.
