= Town Mill, Guildford =

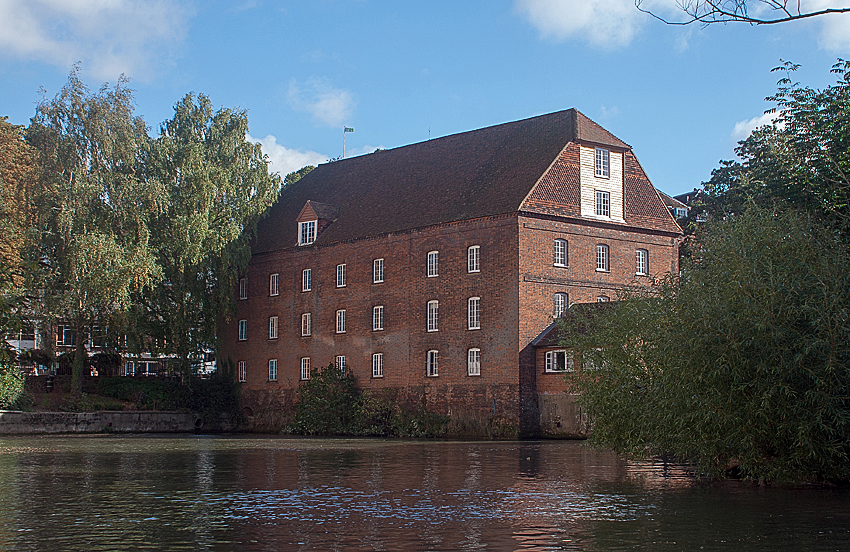

- Location within Surrey
- 51°14′02″N 0°34′29″W
- Type: Watermill
- Location: Guildford, Surrey
- OS grid reference: SU 99596 49263

History
- Built: 1768, extended 1852

Site notes
- Governing body: Yvonne Arnaud Theatre
- Owner: Guildford Borough Council

Listed Building – Grade II
- Official name: Town Mill
- Designated: 1 May 1953
- Reference no.: 1188091

The Town Mill is a Grade II listed 18th-century watermill located in the centre of Guildford on the River Wey.

== History ==
The earliest recorded mill on the site was one constructed by Walter de la Poyle in 1295. This was a fulling mill as Guildford was an important location in the wool trade. This was probably the mill known as Kings Mill. By the late 17th century the mill had been extended to include corn milling with 4 pairs of stones, two for flour and two for animal feed. The whole assembly was driven by three external water wheels. The construction of the Wey Navigation was a boon for the mill, enabling grain to be delivered to the mill by barge and the resulting sacks of flour to be taken, again by barge, to London.

By 1768, the buildings had become rather dilapidated and the eastern range was demolished and replaced by a three-storey red brick edifice with dentil moulding under the eaves of a tiled roof. The western range was simply repaired and continued in use. This section was known as the Hogsmeat Mill. At the same time the old undershot wheels were replaced with more efficient breast shot wheels. In 1827, it was reported that an extension to the Hogsmeat Mill was attached to the Guildford foundry, on the site now occupied by the Yvonne Arnaud Theatre, but this building was demolished by 1852. In 1852, the western section was replaced with an identical brick building styled to match the 1768 building.

From 1770, an additional water wheel was being used to pump water to the town reservoir on Pewley Down. This was replaced by two water turbines in 1896, then a single turbine in 1930, in use until 1952 when it was itself replaced by electric pumps nearby. In 2003, Guildford Borough Council arranged for the refurbishment and installation of an identical turbine as an example of renewable energy. Rather than pumping water, this turbine drives a generator to supply up to 260,000 kWH of electricity into the National Grid, annually. The turbine came on-line in 2006. The 1930 turbine has since been preserved, and is on display at Dapdune Wharf.

The Mill is now used by the adjacent Yvonne Arnaud Theatre as a scenery workshop and studio theatre.

== See also ==
- Mills on the River Wey and its tributaries
- List of watermills in the United Kingdom
