= Sleaford, Hampshire =

Hamlet in Hampshire, England

Coordinates: 51.13484°N 0.8549°W

Sleaford
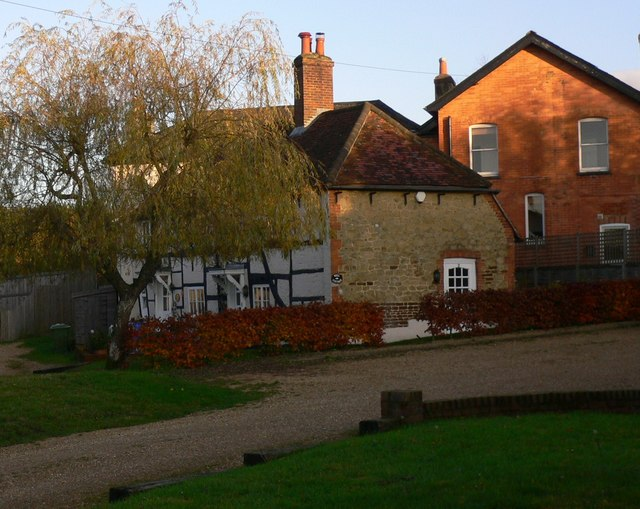
- Cottage

- Location within Hampshire
- OS grid reference: SU802381
- District: East Hampshire
- Shire county: Hampshire
- Region: South East
- Country: England
- Sovereign state: United Kingdom
- Post town: BORDON
- Postcode district: GU35
- Police: Hampshire and Isle of Wight
- Fire: Hampshire and Isle of Wight
- Ambulance: South Central
- UK Parliament: East Hampshire

Sleaford in Hampshire, England is a hamlet of Headley Civil Parish, in Hampshire, England, and the Northanger Ecclesiastical Benefice.

It lies on the A325 and B3004 roads where they cross the small River Slea, a tributary of the Wey. Since the road junction has been re-aligned, there are now three bridges across the river.

Sleaford is at the edge of Broxhead Common, a part of the belt of heathland on the Surrey-Hampshire border from Berkshire to West Sussex, which the British Army found attractive for training. There are numerous military colleges, camps and training grounds in the region which extends in a zone southwards from Windsor, through Camberley, Frimley and Aldershot to Bordon (near Sleaford), Woolmer and Longmoor Military Camp (grid reference SU795310). The last two were set up to train engineers to run railways, a very important skill in the Great War period.
