= Lindford, Hampshire =

Village and parish in Hampshire, England

Coordinates: 51.11803°N 0.84489°W

Lindford
- Location within Hampshire
- Population: 2,791 (2011 Census)
- OS grid reference: SU809360
- Civil parish: Lindford
- District: East Hampshire
- Shire county: Hampshire
- Region: South East
- Country: England
- Sovereign state: United Kingdom
- Post town: BORDON
- Postcode district: GU35
- Dialling code: 01420
- Police: Hampshire and Isle of Wight
- Fire: Hampshire and Isle of Wight
- Ambulance: South Central
- UK Parliament: East Hampshire

Lindford is a village and civil parish in the East Hampshire district of Hampshire, England. It is approximately 1 mile (1.6 km) northeast of Bordon, and west of Headley, East Hampshire on the B3004 road.

The nearest railway station is Liphook, 4 miles (6.4 km) southeast of the village.

With a population of around 2,700, Lindford has a village shop, post office, private dental practice, hair dresser, as well as a Methodist church, a village hall, a pub, The Royal Exchange, and a club.

== Lindford Village Hall ==
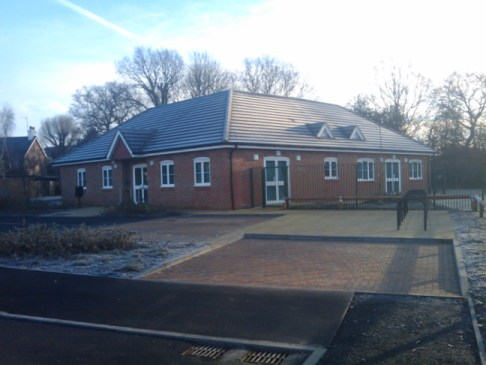
Lindford Village Hall

As part of the permission granted on The Chase development, a new village hall was built. This hall is used for a number of activities including, a nursery school, Brownies, and dance classes.

== Headley Water Mill ==
At the southeast end of the village is Headley Water Mill, dating in part from the 16th century, or earlier.

== Worship ==
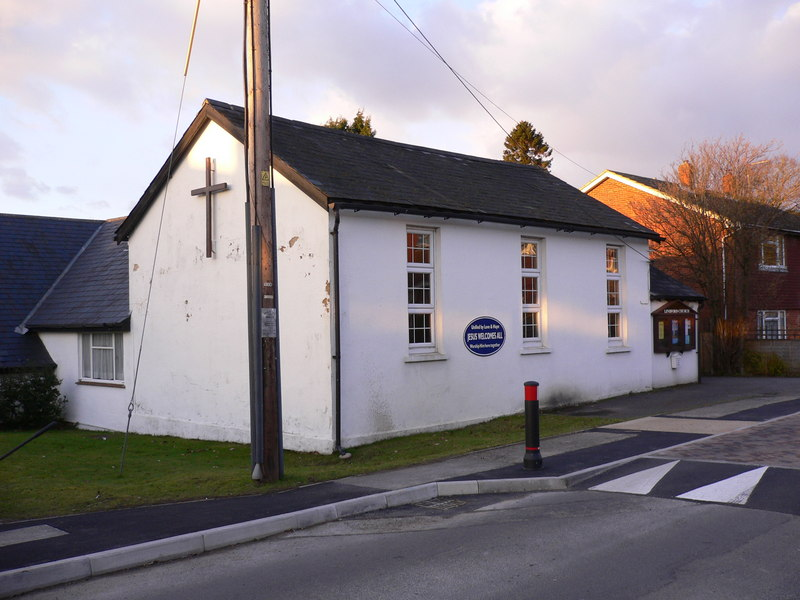
Lindford Methodist Church

Lindford Methodist Church is the only church in the village. The Anglican parish church is All Saints' Church in Headley.

There is also a Church Centre on the outskirts of Lindford in Headley. It hosts groups and clubs, guides, Brownies, rainbows, Cub Scout, Scouts, a Sunday school and holds fetes and charity sales.
