= Standford =

Village in Hampshire, England

Coordinates: 51.10438°N 0.83766°W

- Location within Hampshire
- OS grid reference: SU814345
- Civil parish: Headley
- District: East Hampshire
- Shire county: Hampshire
- Region: South East
- Country: England
- Sovereign state: United Kingdom
- Police: Hampshire and Isle of Wight
- Fire: Hampshire and Isle of Wight
- Ambulance: South Central
- UK Parliament: North East Hampshire

Standford is a village in the East Hampshire district of Hampshire, England. It is 1.3 miles (2.1 km) east of Bordon, on the B3004 road. It is in the civil parish of Headley.

The nearest railway station is Liphook, 2.8 miles (4.5 km) southeast of the village.

== Worship ==
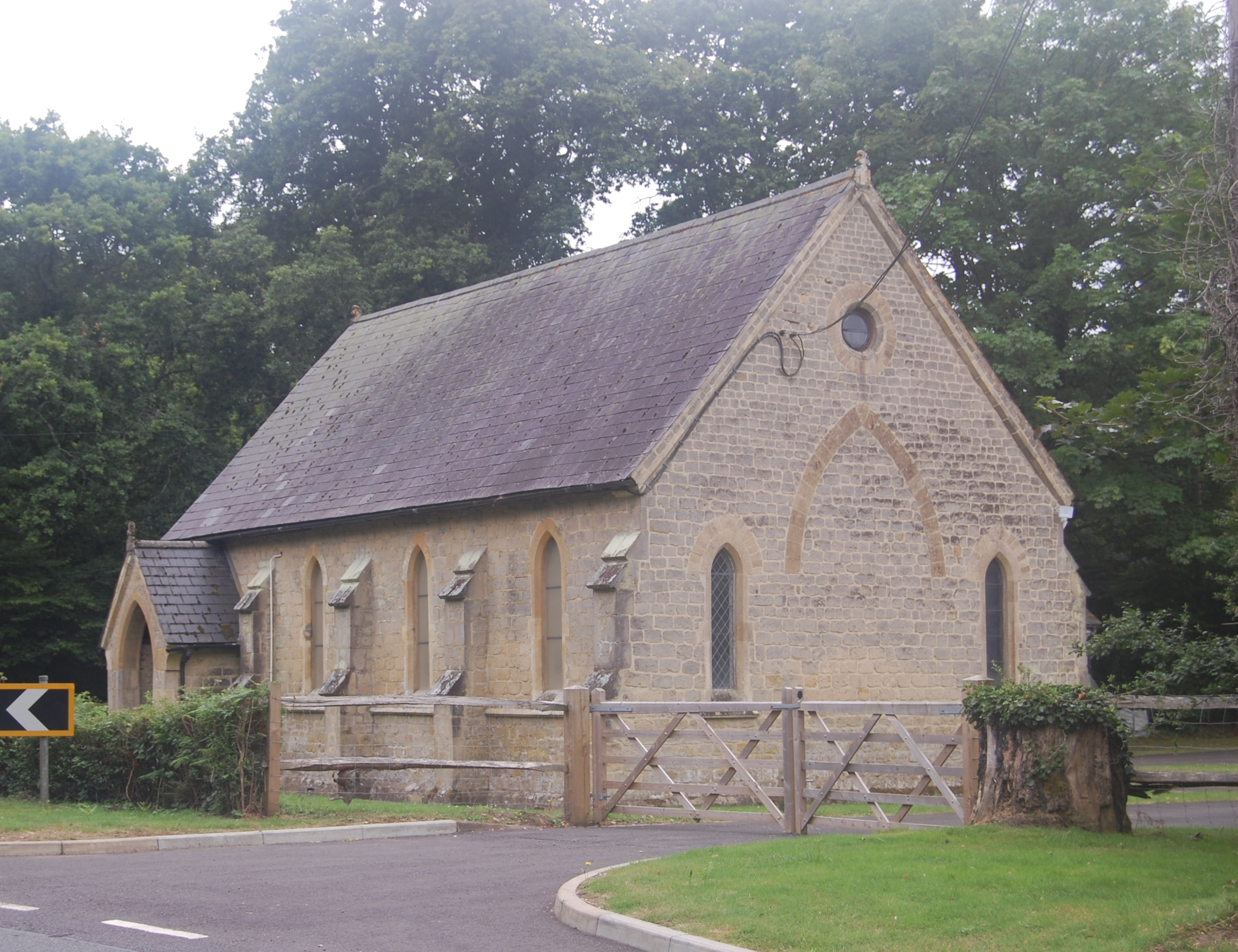
Gospel Hall 2019

Standford Methodist Church was built in 1861 and was in use until 2010; it was renamed as Standford Gospel Hall in 2012 for the Plymouth Brethren Christian Church to use from 2013.
