= Headley, East Hampshire =

Village and parish in Hampshire, England

Coordinates: 51°07′09″N 0°49′38″W

Headley
- Village and civil parish
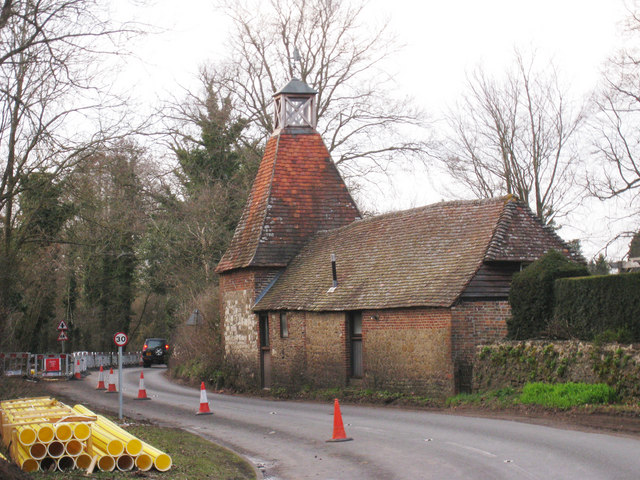
- Oast House at Wey House, Standford Lane

- Location within Hampshire
- Population: 5,613 (2011 Census)
- OS grid reference: SU821362
- Civil parish: Headley
- District: East Hampshire
- Shire county: Hampshire
- Region: South East
- Country: England
- Sovereign state: United Kingdom
- Post town: Bordon
- Postcode district: GU35
- Dialling code: 01428
- Police: Hampshire and Isle of Wight
- Fire: Hampshire and Isle of Wight
- Ambulance: South Central
- UK Parliament: East Hampshire

Headley is a village, civil parish and Anglican parish in the East Hampshire district of Hampshire, England. It is 1.8 miles (2.9 km) east of Bordon on the B3002 road.

The nearest railway station is 3.6 miles (5.8 km) south of the village at Liphook.

The civil parish of Headley has a population of over 5,500. The parish comprises a number of settlements as well as the village of Headley itself. Its area is 4,862 acres (19.68 km^{2}). The original parish included Grayshott (until 1902), Lindford, and a considerable portion of Bordon (until 1929). The ecclesiastical parish of All Saints, Headley served Lindford and Bordon, although not Grayshott, until March 2002; since then, Bordon has become a separate ecclesiastical parish.

== History ==
Headley is the oldest of three villages in the south of England of that name and has gone through a number of name spellings, but was first noted (no households were recorded) in the Domesday Book of 1086 in the ancient hundred of Neatham, at which time Eustace II, Count of Boulogne was tenant-in-chief and Lord. In 1066, Earl Godwin held it. In the 1908 History of the County of Hampshire, Headley is described in detail. There were two manors associated with Headley: Broxhead and Wishanger; the former was broken up by around 1900; the latter's manorial rights had lapsed by about 1700 and part of the former manor now lies within the separate settlement of Headley Down, and passed into the hands of the Whitaker family.

There was a Poor Law Union workhouse built in the parish in 1795, now known as Headley Grange.

In the late 1800s, the Anglican parish of Headley, in the hundred of Alton, covered some 7,000 acres (2,800 ha), of which about half was waste land, but which was in the process of being reclaimed.

== Demographics ==
=== Civil parish ===
The population of the civil parish of Headley was 5,613 at the 2011 census, and comprises a number of surrounding settlements including Standford, Arford, Headley Down, Barford, Sleaford and part of Hollywater.

=== Anglican parish ===
The ecclesiastical parish of All Saints, Headley served Lindford and Bordon, although not Grayshott, until March 2002; since then, Bordon has become a separate, ecumenical parish.

== Amenities ==
Headley Cricket Club is to the west of the village centre, their grounds also accommodating bowls and soccer clubs. Headley CC play in the I'Anson league (2015) and have 3 senior men's teams, as well as ladies' and youth teams.

The Holly Bush is a public house in the centre of the village. The current building dates from the 19th century. Its predecessor of the same name is believed to have been on the other side of the road when William Cobbett visited Headley in 1822 as part of his Rural Rides.

Headley Theatre Club was founded in 1952, building on the success of a pageant held to celebrate the Festival of Britain the previous year. It was felt that an organisation should be formed in the Village to encourage such enthusiasm and talent on a more permanent basis. The Club puts on a pantomime, a 3-act play and a musical event each year.

== Notable people ==
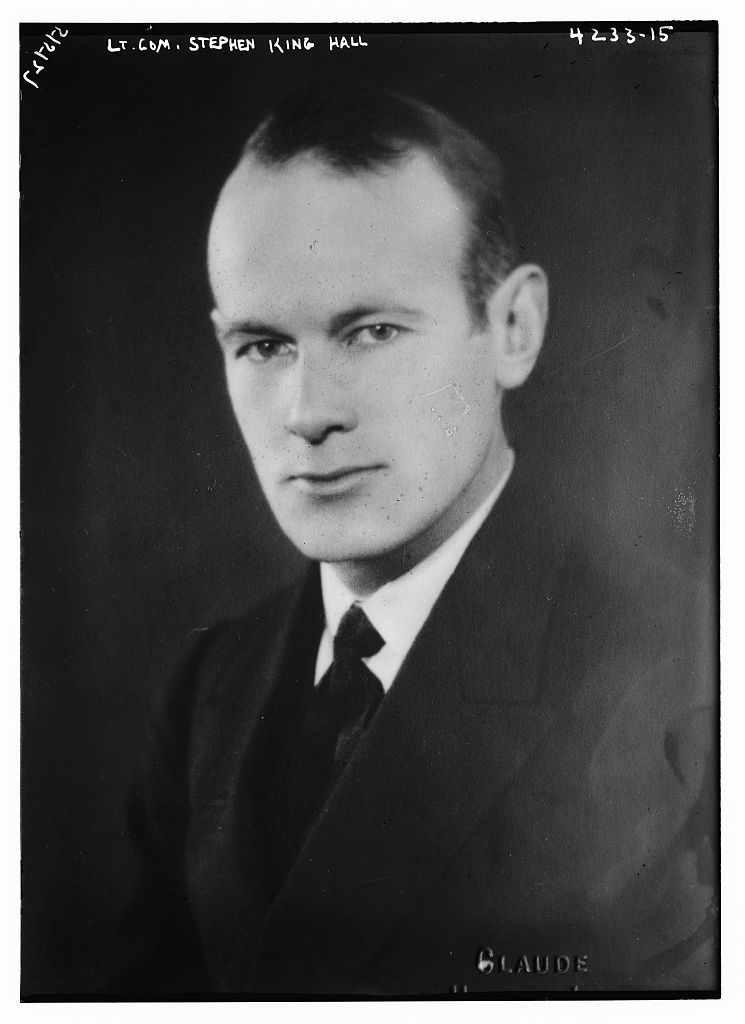
Lord King-Hall, 1917

- Sir Robert Samuel Wright (1839-1904), British judge and author
- Lord King-Hall of Headley (1893-1966), journalist, playwright and politician
- Jessica Hawkins (born 1995), racing driver

=== Music Industry ===
- Headley Grange was used as a recording studio by several famous pop groups in the 1970s including: Genesis, Bad Company, The Pretty Things, Ian Dury (1976) and Clover (1977) – notably in 1971 Led Zeppelin recorded their fourth album there, Led Zeppelin IV, containing Stairway to Heaven.
- Benifold, in Headley Hill Road, was bought by the group Fleetwood Mac in 1970 and used to record their Penguin and Mystery to Me albums with the Rolling Stones Mobile Studio. They sold the property around 1974 after permanently relocating to Los Angeles, California.

== Worship ==
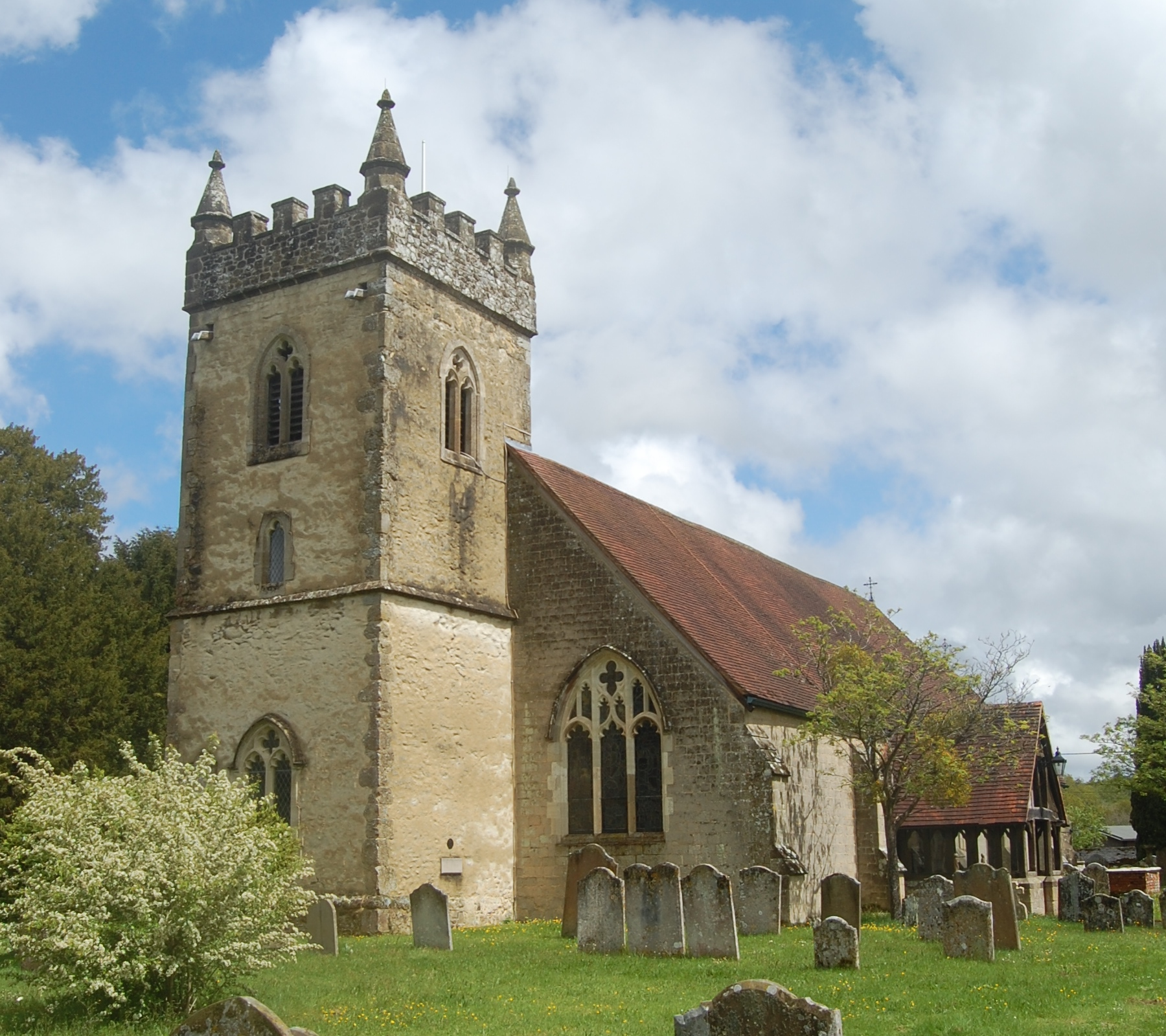
All Saints Church

All Saints Anglican Church is in the centre of the village, and is in the Diocese of Guildford. The church predates 1836 when the wooden-shingled spire burnt down. The church was subsequently rebuilt (without the spire) in 1859. Features in the rebuilt church date its existence back at least to the 13th century. Nikolaus Pevsner noted that the oblong piece of 13th century stained glass of a female saint being decapitated was ”exquisite”.

There are several other places of worship in the parish, including Baptist and Methodist churches.

== Listed buildings ==
There are 69 listed buildings and other structures in and around the civil parish, including the parish church, war memorial and a telephone kiosk.
