= Oakhanger Stream =

River in Hampshire, England

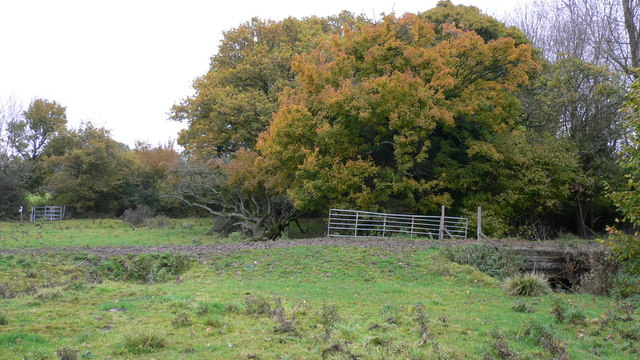
- Footbridge over the Oakhanger Stream near the village of Oakhanger

Location
- Country: England
- Counties: Hampshire
- Districts / Boroughs: East Hampshire
- Towns: Selborne

Physical characteristics
- Source: Well Head
  - location: Noar Hill, Selborne
  - coordinates: 51°05′21″N 0°56′24″W
  - elevation: 126 m (415 ft)
- Mouth: River Slea
  - location: Kingsley
  - coordinates: 51°07′57″N 0°52′52″W
  - elevation: 72 m (235 ft)
- Length: 8.343 km (5.184 mi)
- Basin size: 18.703 km^{2} (7.221 sq mi)

Basin features
- River system: Wey catchment
- Tributaries
  - left: Gracious Street Stream

Oakhanger Stream is a tributary of the River Slea that lies in Hampshire, England.

== Course ==
The source is at Well Head, at the foot of Noar Hill, to the south of Selborne. The initial section towards Selborne is known as the Well Head Stream, the route was diverted in 1894 to provide a supply of water to the village in memory of Gilbert White. At Dorton, on the north side of Selborne, it is joined by the Gracious Street Stream. From Selborne, now known as the Oakhanger Stream, it passes through the village of Oakhanger then skirts the east side of Shortheath Common and on towards Kingsley Mill where it joins with the Kingsley Stream to form the River Slea.

== Watermills ==
There were, at least, two corn mills on the Oakhanger Stream, the Old Mill in Selborne, a Grade II listed building now used as a private residence, and Dorton Mill, midway between Selborne and Oakhanger, of which no trace is now visible.

== Water quality ==
The Environment Agency measure water quality of the river systems in England. Each is given an overall ecological status, which may be one of five levels: high, good, moderate, poor and bad. There are several components that are used to determine this, including biological status, which looks at the quantity and varieties of invertebrates, angiosperms and fish. Chemical status, which compares the concentrations of various chemicals against known safe concentrations, is rated good or fail.

The water quality of the Oakhanger Stream was as follows in 2019:

Section	Ecological Status	Chemical Status	Overall Status	Length	Catchment	Channel
Oakhanger Stream	Poor	Fail	Poor	8.343 km (5.184 mi)	18.703 km^{2} (7.221 sq mi)	

The reasons for not reaching good status is due to agricultural and waste water pollution.
