= Kingsley Stream =

River in Hampshire, England

Location
- Country: England
- Counties: Hampshire
- Districts / Boroughs: East Hampshire
- Towns: Alton, Bordon

Physical characteristics
- Source
  - location: Kingsley, Alton / Bordon, Hampshire, United Kingdom
- Mouth: River Slea
  - location: Alton, East Hampshire, Hampshire
  - coordinates: 51°07′57″N 0°52′52″W
- Length: 6.2 km (3.9 mi)

Basin features
- Tributaries
  - right: Oakhanger Stream, Oxney Stream

Kingsley Stream is a tributary of the River Slea that lies in Hampshire, England. It joins the Oakhanger Stream by Kingsley Mill, south of the village. It is regarded by the Environment Agency as the headwaters of the Slea.
