= Grade II* listed buildings in East Hampshire =

There are over 20,000 Grade II* listed buildings in England. This page is a list of these buildings in the district of East Hampshire in Hampshire.

== East Hampshire ==
Name	Location	Type	Completed (Note: The date given is the date used by Historic England as significant for the initial building or that of an important part in the structure's description.)	Date designated	Grid ref. (Note: Sometimes known as OSGB36, the grid reference is based on the British national grid reference system used by the Ordnance Survey.) Geo-coordinates	Entry number (Note: The "List Entry Number" is a unique number assigned to each listed building and scheduled monument by Historic England.)	Image
Andrews Endowed C of E Primary School	Holybourne, Alton, East Hampshire	School	Modern	13 March 1951	SU7321040820; 51°09′43″N 0°57′16″W	1338937	Andrews Endowed C of E Primary School More images
Bonham's Farm House	Holybourne, Alton	House	Late 17th century	31 March 1977	SU7421841758; 51°10′13″N 0°56′23″W	1094173	Upload Photo
Holy Rood Church	Holybourne, Alton	Church	Norman	13 March 1951	SU7324941244; 51°09′57″N 0°57′14″W	1179586	Holy Rood Church More images
Westbrooke House	Alton	House	Circa early 18th century	13 March 1951	SU7161839211; 51°08′52″N 0°58′39″W	1094199	Upload Photo
Wyards Farm House	Beech	House	1691	13 March 1951	SU6982638894; 51°08′42″N 1°00′11″W	1179568	Upload Photo
Church of St Mary	Bentley	Parish Church	12th century	31 July 1963	SU7840844694; 51°11′46″N 0°52′45″W	1094090	Church of St Mary More images
Coldrey	Lower Froyle, Bentley	Timber Framed House	Mid 16th century	31 July 1963	SU7710743697; 51°11′14″N 0°53′53″W	1302259	Coldrey More images
Marelands	Bentley	House	16th century	31 July 1963	SU7936243863; 51°11′19″N 0°51′57″W	1094060	Marelands More images
Former chapel immediately west of Hall Farmhouse	Bentworth	Boiler House	1985	31 May 1985	SU6630839977; 51°09′19″N 1°03′12″W	1094156	Former chapel immediately west of Hall Farmhouse
Church of St Mary	Bentworth	Parish Church	Late 12th century	31 July 1963	SU6654040289; 51°09′29″N 1°03′00″W	1094149	Church of St Mary More images
Hall Farmhouse	Bentworth	Farmhouse	17th century	31 July 1963	SU6632839982; 51°09′19″N 1°03′11″W	1338928	Hall Farmhouse More images
Barn 30m north of West Court	Binsted	Barn	15th century	15 August 1985	SU7658141140; 51°09′52″N 0°54′22″W	1338987	Upload Photo
Bramshott Manor	Bramshott, Bramshott and Liphook	House	c. 1300	16 March 1954	SU8422632851; 51°05′20″N 0°47′56″W	1094484	Bramshott Manor
Bramshott Vale	Bramshott, Bramshott and Liphook	House	Early 18th century	16 March 1954	SU8371132899; 51°05′22″N 0°48′22″W	1094496	Bramshott Vale More images
Church of St Mary	Bramshott, Bramshott and Liphook	Parish Church	c. 1220	16 March 1954	SU8426632896; 51°05′21″N 0°47′54″W	1094480	Church of St Mary More images
Passfield House	Passfield, Bramshott and Liphook	House	16th century	16 March 1954	SU8244034507; 51°06′14″N 0°49′26″W	1351147	Upload Photo
Tudor Gatehouse at Bramshott Place (King George's Hospital)	Bramshott and Liphook	Gatehouse	Early 16th century	23 January 1986	SU8450832219; 51°04′59″N 0°47′42″W	1236791	Tudor Gatehouse at Bramshott Place (King George's Hospital) More images
Barn at Old Ditcham Farm	Buriton	Barn	17th century	16 March 1954	SU7603620324; 50°58′38″N 0°55′06″W	1094618	Barn at Old Ditcham Farm More images
Church of St Mary	Buriton	Parish Church	12th century	16 March 1954	SU7401520016; 50°58′29″N 0°56′50″W	1302500	Church of St Mary More images
The Manor House	Buriton	Country House	16th century	16 March 1954	SU7403620082; 50°58′31″N 0°56′49″W	1094597	The Manor House More images
The Old Rectory	Buriton	House	1986	16 March 1954	SU7388820049; 50°58′30″N 0°56′56″W	1094622	The Old Rectory More images
Chawton House	Chawton	Country House	c. 1580	31 July 1963	SU7087937026; 51°07′41″N 0°59′19″W	1093975	Chawton House More images
Church of St Nicholas	Chawton	Parish Church	Medieval	31 July 1963	SU7079137033; 51°07′42″N 0°59′23″W	1093974	Church of St Nicholas More images
The Manor House	Chawton	House	Late C20	31 July 1963	SU7081337079; 51°07′43″N 0°59′22″W	1093971	The Manor House More images
Church of St Michael	Chalton, Clanfield	Parish Church	late 12th century or 13th century	16 March 1954	SU7320015945; 50°56′18″N 0°57′35″W	1302399	Church of St Michael More images
Manor Farmhouse	Chalton, Clanfield	Farmhouse	15th century	12 March 1986	SU7328715978; 50°56′19″N 0°57′30″W	1351091	Manor Farmhouse
The Priory	Chalton, Clanfield	House	post 1540	12 March 1986	SU7317515928; 50°56′17″N 0°57′36″W	1178520	The Priory
Church of St Peter Ad Vincula	Colemore, Colemore and Priors Dean	Parish Church	11th century	16 March 1954	SU7060030762; 51°04′19″N 0°59′37″W	1237037	Church of St Peter Ad Vincula More images
Priors Dean Church	Priors Dean, Colemore and Priors Dean	Church	1634	16 March 1954	SU7278329601; 51°03′40″N 0°57′46″W	1237077	Priors Dean Church More images
Forge Sound	East Meon	House	c. 1600	29 January 1982	SU6817522107; 50°59′40″N 1°01′48″W	1302212	Upload Photo
Glenthorne and Forecourt Rail	East Meon	House	C20	16 March 1954	SU6807622133; 50°59′40″N 1°01′53″W	1094591	Upload Photo
Peak Farmhouse	East Meon	Farmhouse	1728	16 March 1954	SU6664325413; 51°01′27″N 1°03′04″W	1302347	Upload Photo
Church of St James	East Tisted	Parish Church	Medieval	31 July 1963	SU7013032281; 51°05′08″N 1°00′00″W	1351138	Church of St James More images
Church of All Saints	Farringdon	Parish Church	12th century	31 July 1963	SU7123735443; 51°06′50″N 0°59′01″W	1179147	Church of All Saints More images
Cruck Cottage	Farringdon	House	15th century	11 October 1985	SU7115635326; 51°06′46″N 0°59′06″W	1093984	Cruck Cottage More images
Manor House Farmhouse	Farringdon	House	16th century	16 December 1982	SU7116135502; 51°06′52″N 0°59′05″W	1302182	Manor House Farmhouse
Church of the Holy Trinity	Privett, Froxfield and Privett	Parish Church	1876 to 1878	15 May 1978	SU6767226966; 51°02′17″N 1°02′10″W	1237168	Church of the Holy Trinity More images
Trees Cottage	Bydean Farm, Froxfield	Cruck house	Mid 14th century	23 January 1986	SU7055026079; 51°01′47″N 0°59′43″W	1094460	Upload Photo
Froyle Place	Upper Froyle, Froyle	Country House	of medieval origin	31 July 1963	SU7555442817; 51°10′47″N 0°55′14″W	1179185	Froyle Place
Hodges Farmhouse	Lower Froyle, Froyle	Farmhouse	Later	31 July 1963	SU7577944407; 51°11′38″N 0°55′01″W	1302202	Hodges Farmhouse
Husseys	Lower Froyle, Froyle	House	18th century	31 July 1963	SU7650544332; 51°11′35″N 0°54′24″W	1302242	Upload Photo
Manor House	Upper Froyle, Froyle	House	17th century	31 July 1963	SU7546442630; 51°10′41″N 0°55′19″W	1094104	Upload Photo
Silvester's Farmhouse	Lower Froyle, Froyle	Farmhouse	Elizabethan	31 July 1963	SU7620244176; 51°11′30″N 0°54′39″W	1178980	Upload Photo
Church of St Peter and St Paul	Upper Green, Hawkley	Church	On site of medieval church	23 January 1986	SU7458629162; 51°03′25″N 0°56′14″W	1094438	Church of St Peter and St Paul More images
Hill Place	Empshott, Hawkley	House	c. 1670	16 March 1954	SU7548531242; 51°04′32″N 0°55′26″W	1351181	Upload Photo
Suters	Headley	House	15th century	15 August 1985	SU8216836235; 51°07′10″N 0°49′39″W	1093985	Upload Photo
Church of All Saints	Catherington, Horndean	Parish Church	Late 12th century	16 March 1954	SU6964914516; 50°55′33″N 1°00′37″W	1094569	Church of All Saints More images
Church of St Nicholas	Kingsley	Chapel	1778	31 May 1963	SU7785437852; 51°08′05″N 0°53′19″W	1157331	Church of St Nicholas More images
Lasham House	Lasham	House	Early 18th century	31 July 1963	SU6756242347; 51°10′35″N 1°02′06″W	1094109	Upload Photo
Church of St Peter	West Liss, Liss	Parish Church	Circa early 13th century	16 March 1954	SU7705128679; 51°03′08″N 0°54′08″W	1351203	Church of St Peter More images
Dragon House	Petersfield	House	Early 18th century	29 July 1949	SU7482123064; 51°00′08″N 0°56′06″W	1179494	Dragon House More images
Goodyers	Petersfield	House	16th century	19 July 1949	SU7446823172; 51°00′11″N 0°56′24″W	1339220	Goodyers More images
Heath Lodge	Petersfield	House	Late 18th century	19 July 1949	SU7497322857; 51°00′01″N 0°55′59″W	1093531	Upload Photo
The Old College (Register Office)	Petersfield	House	1729	29 July 1949	SU7491523619; 51°00′26″N 0°56′01″W	1301953	The Old College (Register Office) More images
9 and 11 Dragon Street	Petersfield	House	Early 18th century	29 July 1949	SU7480823104; 51°00′09″N 0°56′07″W	1339229	Upload Photo
1 The Square	Petersfield	House	Early 16th century	29 July 1949	SU7459723298; 51°00′15″N 0°56′18″W	1093564	1 The Square More images
Ropley House	Ropley	House	Mid 18th century	31 July 1963	SU6361031968; 51°05′01″N 1°05′36″W	1157351	Upload Photo
Soames Place	Ropley	House	15th century	31 July 1963	SU6545330696; 51°04′19″N 1°04′02″W	1339059	Upload Photo
Blackmoor House	Blackmoor, Selborne	Flats	1869	2 August 1973	SU7798732870; 51°05′23″N 0°53′16″W	1094553	Upload Photo
Church of St Matthew	Blackmoor, Selborne	Parish Church	1868	31 July 1963	SU7805033563; 51°05′46″N 0°53′12″W	1351142	Church of St Matthew More images
Blackmoor War Memorial	Blackmoor, Selborne	War memorial	1920	18 July 1986	SU7800733588; 51°05′47″N 0°53′15″W	1174603	Blackmoor War Memorial More images
Manor Farmhouse	Shalden	Farmhouse	16th century	31 May 1985	SU6959742049; 51°10′24″N 1°00′21″W	1179466	Manor Farmhouse
Church of All Saints	Steep	Parish Church	12th century	16 March 1954	SU7458825298; 51°01′20″N 0°56′17″W	1351171	Church of All Saints More images
Coldhayes	Steep Marsh, Steep	Country House	1869	23 January 1986	SU7564826943; 51°02′13″N 0°55′21″W	1351190	Upload Photo
Church of St Mary Magdalene	West Tisted	Parish Church	11th century	31 July 1963	SU6501929211; 51°03′31″N 1°04′25″W	1351153	Church of St Mary Magdalene More images
Church of St Leonard	Hartley Mauditt, Worldham	Parish Church	Early 12th century	31 July 1963	SU7429736105; 51°07′10″N 0°56′23″W	1094509	Church of St Leonard More images
Church of St Mary	East Worldham, Worldham	Parish Church	13th century	31 July 1963	SU7506038128; 51°08′15″N 0°55′43″W	1351156	Church of St Mary More images
Hartley Mauditt House	Hartley Mauditt, Worldham, East Hampshire	House	after 1820	18 July 1986	SU7424036540; 51°07′24″N 0°56′26″W	1351158	Upload Photo
