= Nicholas Greaves =

English churchman

Nicholas Greaves, D.D. (1605?–1673) was an English churchman who was Dean of Dromore cathedral, County Down.

== Life ==
He was the second son of John Greaves, rector of Colemore, near Alresford, Hampshire. His brothers were John Greaves, Sir Edward Greaves and Thomas Greaves.

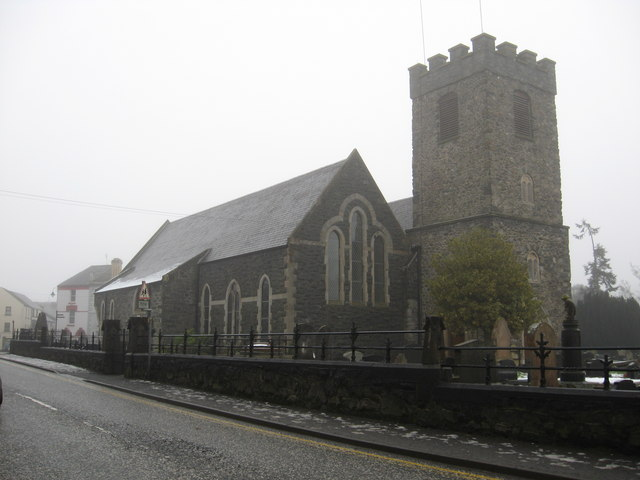
Dromore cathedral (Church of Ireland)

He studied as a commoner at St. Mary Hall, Oxford. He was elected fellow of All Souls' College in 1627, and junior Proctor of the university in 1640 (a position also held by his brother John's nemesis, Nathaniel Brent in 1607) In 1642 he became the rector of Tullylish, Co. Down. The parish, in the Church of Ireland diocese of Dromore, is part of the original endowment of the Dromore deanery. The church had been partially destroyed during the Irish rebellion the previous year. Greaves held the living until 1673.

On 1 November 1642 he took his Bachelor of Divinity degree, and D.D. on 6 July 1643. He was presented as Dean of Dromore Cathedral on 21 March 1643, but not necessarily installed. The Bishop of Dromore was Theophilus Buckworth, the brother-in-law of archbishop James Ussher. Ussher was a friend and correspondent of Greaves' oldest brother, John Greaves. Buckworth had restored the old Dromore cathedral between 1613–1622 and begun to build a new bishop's palace; but they had been burned down along with the rest of the town on 15 November 1641 during the rebellion of that year. Buckworth was forced to flee to England, and returned to his place of birth at White Hall manor near Wisbech, Cambridgeshire. This is probably connected with Greaves' time at St. John's College, Cambridge.

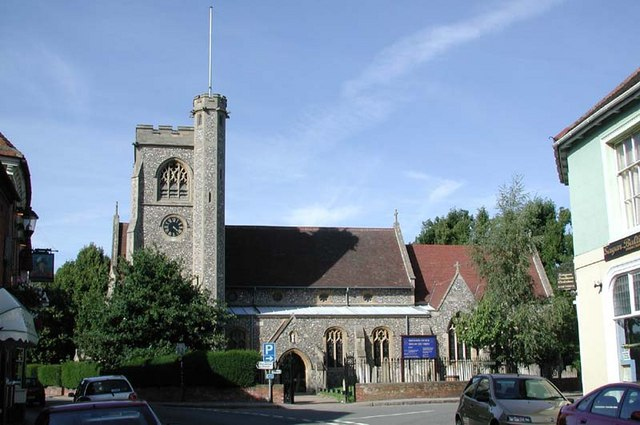
St Mary the Virgin, Welwyn

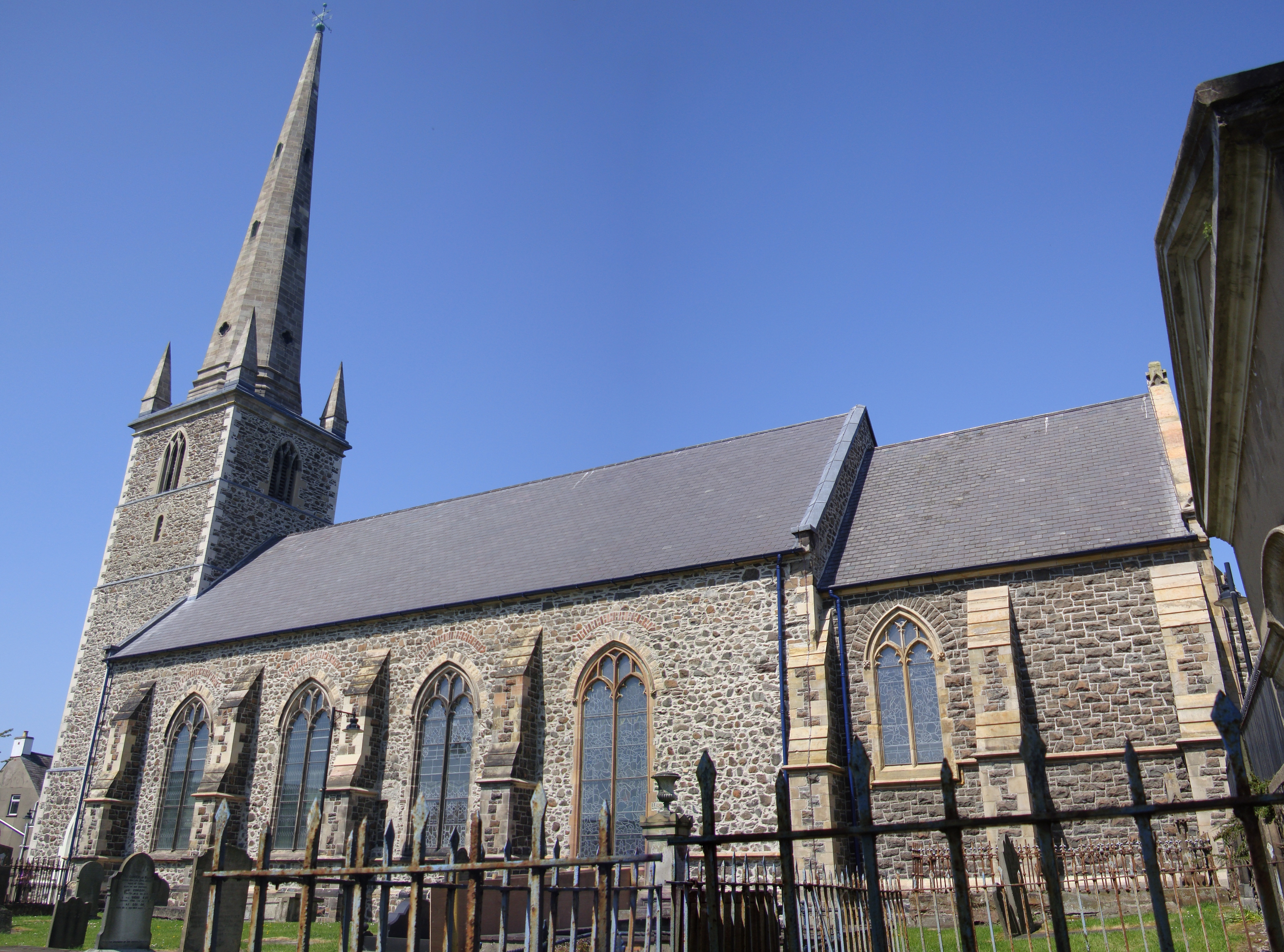
Lisburn cathedral

He was the rector of the valuable living of Welwyn, Hertfordshire (the advowson of All Souls' College), from 1651 until he was deprived of it by the Act of Uniformity 1662. This act only applied to the Church of England, so his position within the Church of Ireland was not affected. His successor at Welwyn was Gabriel Towerson.

When his brother John Greaves died in 1652, Nicholas was the executor of his will. John had left his astronomical instruments (including an astrolabe belonging to Elizabeth I) to Oxford University, for the use of the Savilian Professors of Astronomy. Nicholas kept hold of the instruments until the end of the Commonwealth and didn't present them to the university until 1659, with suitable inscriptions.

After Bishop Buckworth died (also in 1652), the diocese of Dromore remained vacant until the Restoration. In 1653 Greaves was involved in a dispute over "money matters in Oxfordshire" with Francis and Henry Babington. The new bishop of Dromore, Robert Leslie, was consecrated in January 1661, and Greaves was finally installed as Dean on 26 March 1661. The rebuilding of the new cathedral took place between 1661–1667 under the caretaker bishop Jeremy Taylor; it has been enlarged several times since.

Greaves became the Treasurer of the Chapter of Lisburn Cathedral in 1668. Lisburn, like so many other places in Ulster, was burned down in 1641, and its replacement was constituted as the cathedral church of the newly created Church of Ireland diocese of Down and Connor.

Greaves probably died in 1673.

== See also ==
- Diocese of Down and Dromore
