= King John's Hill =

Iron Age hillfort in Hampshire, England

Coordinates: 51.133522°N 0.92102°W

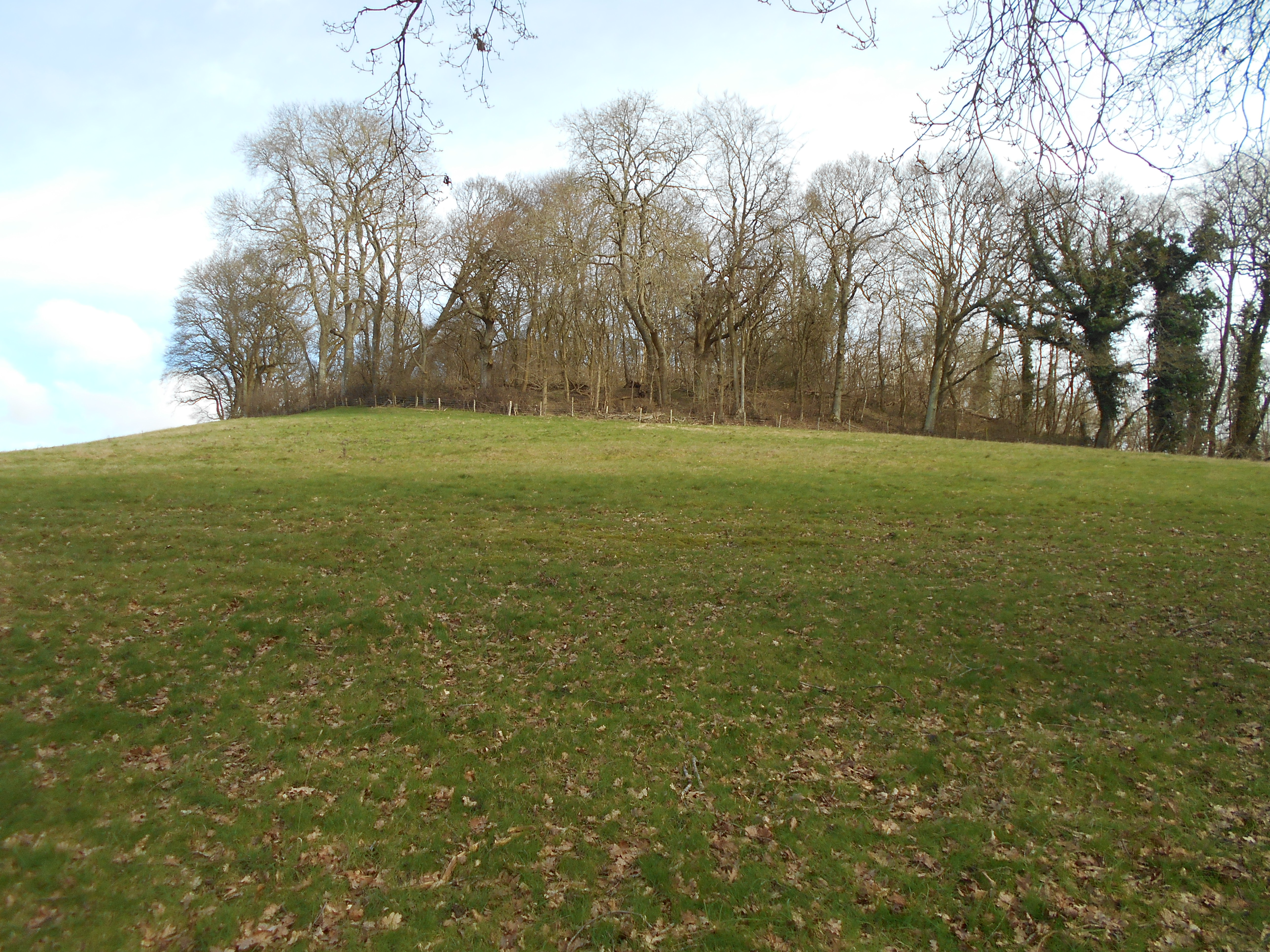
Summit of King John's Hill

King John's Hill is the site of an Iron Age hillfort located in Hampshire, in southeast England. The hill is situated in the parish of Worldham, in East Hampshire District. It is a Scheduled Ancient Monument with a list entry identification number of 1020314, and a Monument Number of 243207.

King John's Hill is a small multivallate hillfort, a fort with multiple defensive rings, and has been dated on ceramic evidence to approximately 100 BC. It was later reoccupied during the medieval period, with 13th–14th century AD building traces and pottery fragments. These have been identified as the potential remains of a hunting lodge traditionally said to have been built by King John.

== Location and geology ==
The hill rises 129 metres (423 ft) above mean sea level and is just over 0.5 kilometres (0.31 mi) southeast of the village of East Worldham, and approximately 4 kilometres (2.5 mi) east of the town of Alton. The hill falls within the boundaries of the South Downs National Park. It is a greensand tor, with a flat top and steep sides; it is heavily wooded, with dense undergrowth.

== Description ==
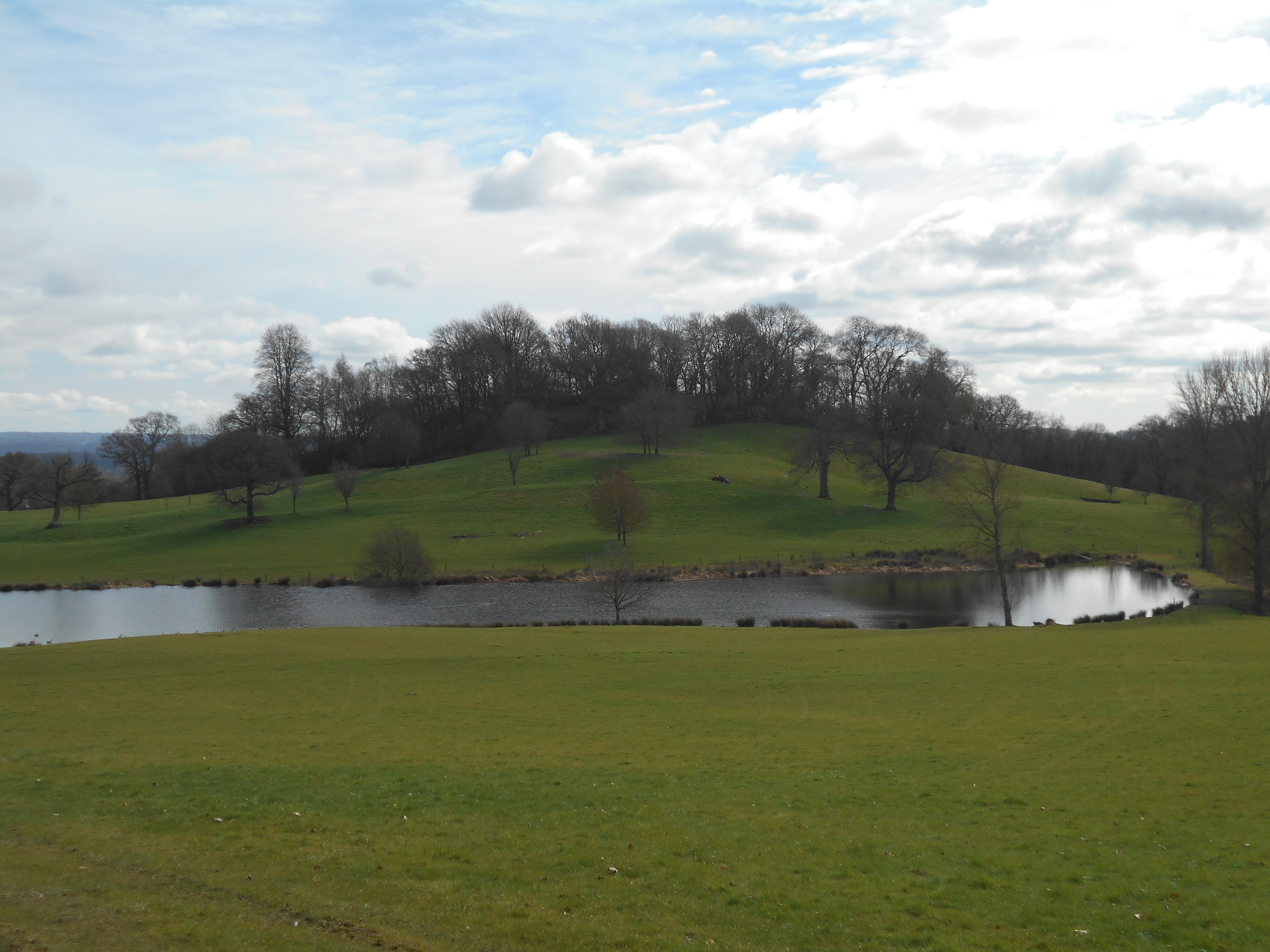
King John's Hill from the west

The hillfort is unusually small, and its defences were weak; the site falls in a borderline category between larger hillforts and smaller defended settlements. It is oval in shape and encloses an area of approximately 0.8 hectares (86,000 sq ft). Although it has suffered some damage by malm quarrying, it is still well preserved. Limited archaeological excavation revealed plentiful evidence of the hill's Iron Age occupation, later medieval remains, and post-medieval activity.

The quarrying has destroyed the fort's defences on the north side of the hill, but they are elsewhere evidenced by two concentric scarps separated by a wide shelf. On the northeast side, a ridge line meets the fort, and was cut by a shallow ditch, which meets with a later boundary that runs around the base of the hill on the east side, and encloses a number of terraces on the lower slopes of the hill.

== Investigation ==
The hill was partially excavated in 1939 and 1947. Ceramic fragments dating to the Iron Age were recovered, and two infilled storage pits were discovered. Evidence of the medieval occupation of the site was also revealed, including stonework and ceramics. Further remains date from the Tudor period, and include short lengths of wall, packed floors, bricks, tiles, and ovens. A ring-headed pin, fashioned from wire, was recovered from one of the Iron Age storage pits. The traditional association of the hill as a site of a medieval hunting lodge attributed to King John is supported by documentary evidence that a deer park existed at East Worldham at least as far back as 1372.
