= Towerson =

Towerson is a surname. Notable people with the surname include:

- Gabriel Towerson (1635?–1697), English clergyman
- Gabriel Towerson (East India Company) (1576–1623), captain and agent for the East India Company
- William Towerson (died c. 1631), English merchant
