= West Worldham =

Village and parish in Hampshire, England

Coordinates: 51.12717°N 0.94205°W

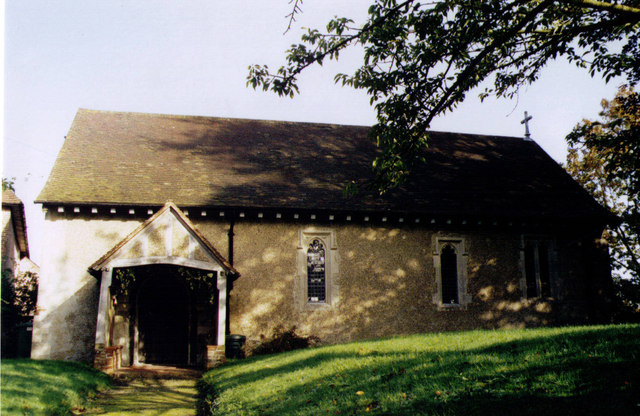
- St Nicholas Church

- Location within Hampshire
- OS grid reference: SU741369
- Civil parish: Worldham
- District: East Hampshire
- Shire county: Hampshire
- Region: South East
- Country: England
- Sovereign state: United Kingdom
- Post town: Alton
- Postcode district: GU34
- Police: Hampshire and Isle of Wight
- Fire: Hampshire and Isle of Wight
- Ambulance: South Central
- UK Parliament: East Hampshire

West Worldham is a small village and former civil parish, now in the parish of Worldham, in the East Hampshire district of Hampshire, England. It is 2.1 miles (3.4 km) southeast of the town of Alton. The village of East Worldham is to the East and Hartley Mauditt is to the South, which along with West Worldham form the current Parish of Worldham.

West Worldham contains some eighteen houses with a population of about 50; about half the population of 1851, when it was 98.

Manor Farm and cottage and the late 12th century St Nicholas Church are both Grade II listed buildings.

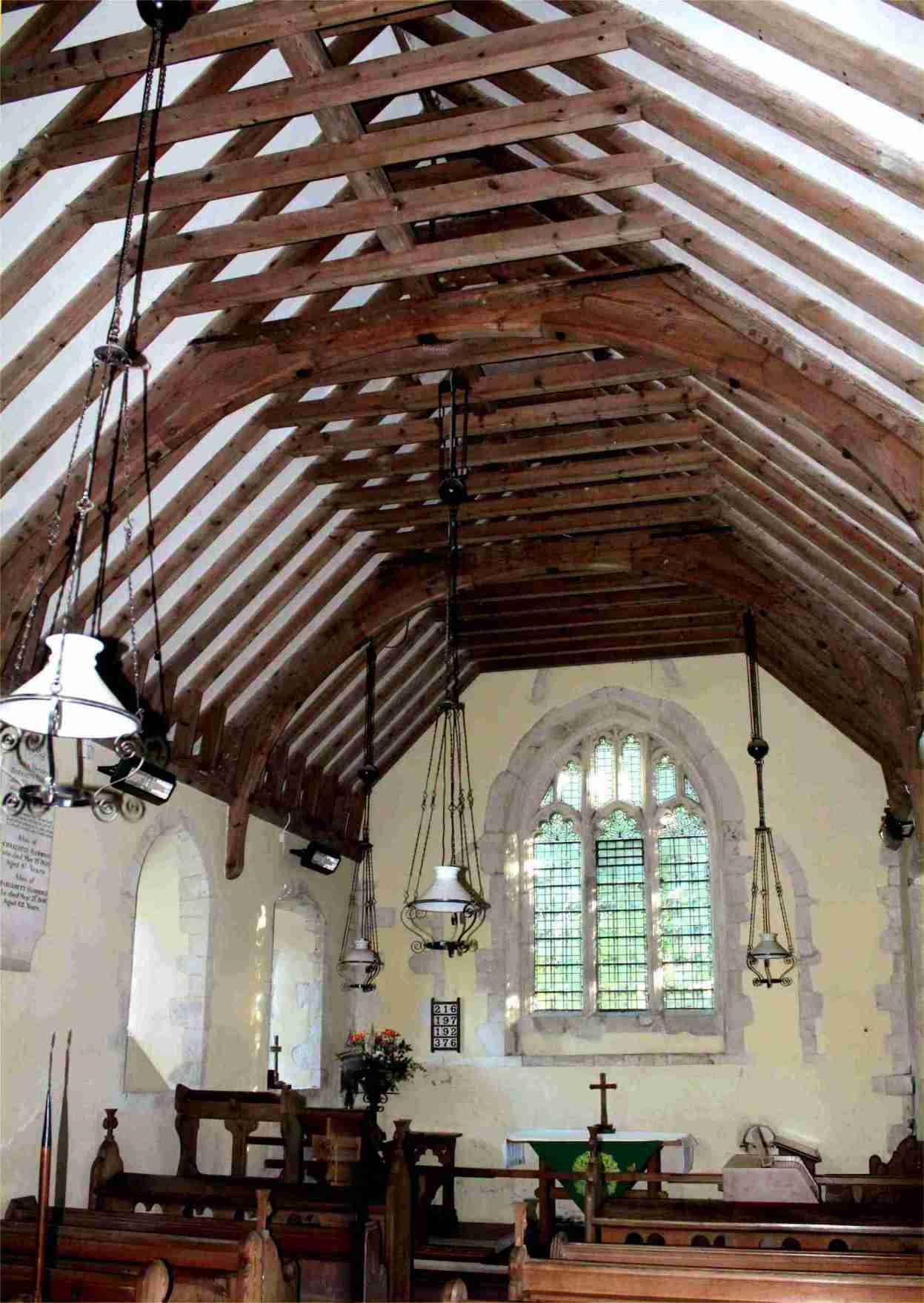
West Worldham St Nicholas church inside

== History ==
Archeological findings in the fields between West and East Worldham reveal that the area has been inhabited since at least the Palaeolithic era.

An Iron Age hillfort, dated to around 100 BC, lay on the summit of King John's Hill, to the east of East Worldham.

The Romans built a road from Chichester to Silchester that passed below the hill over what is now Green Street and Pookles Lane.

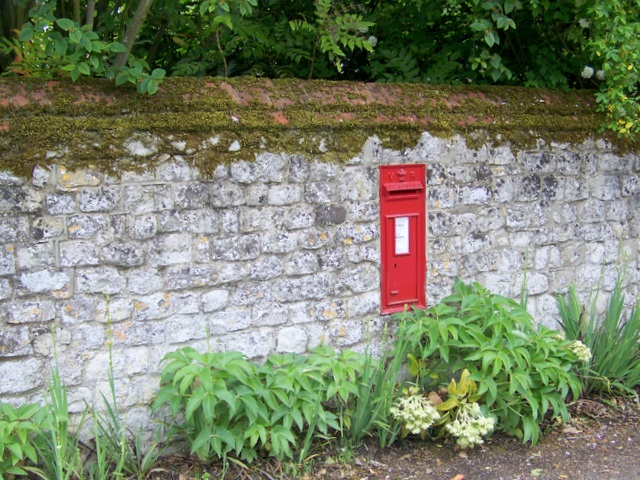
A Victorian postbox on the wall of Pullens Farm

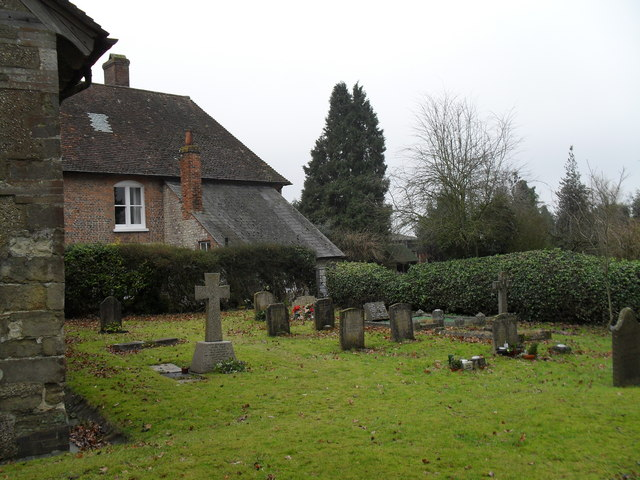
Looking from the churchyard at St Nicholas, towards Manor Farm

The village is believed to have been part of "Werildeham", mentioned in the Domesday Book. At this time, Worldham manor was held by Marshal Geoffrey de Venuz.

The first mention of West Worldham as a village is in a document dated October 1277. In the late 12th century, Richard de Annecy granted the newly built church of St Nicholas of Worldeham to Hamble Priory.

During its history, Worldham has been spelled in many different ways, including Verilham, Worldham and Werldham in the 14th century and Wardelham in the 16th century. An early occupant was Thomas Paynil, who "died possessed of West Worlddham lands and tenements". During the reign of Edward II, "John Paynel was seized in his demesne as of fee of certain tenements and lands afterwards called the manor of West Worldham and Matilda". Godwin held Worldham during this period, and the land was assessed at 1 hide and 1 yardland. In 1428, the village had "not ten domicilia tenantes". During the medieval period, the area was a noted hunting ground, and the descendants of Geoffrey de Venuz established a private deer park and hunting lodge near here.

The naturalist and ornithologist Gilbert White immortalised the localities of the region, including West Worldham, in his The Natural History and Antiquities of Selborne (1789).

In 1846, Henry Moody, curator of the Winchester Museum, wrote about West Worldham, "a perpetual curacy in the gift of Winchester College, worth according to the Parliamentary returns £38; but has since received two additional endowments of £200 from Queen Anne's Bounty, and £200 from the warden and fellows of Winchester College, who are the appropriators of the tythes, and patrons of the living."

In the next decade, John Dutton, 2nd Baron Sherborne was lord of the manor and his son, James Dutton, 3rd Baron Sherborne, was noted to be its owner in the 1870s.

In the late 1800s, William Wickham, MP, was the Guardian of West Worldham.

By the early 20th century, the parish of Worldham remained under ownership of Winchester College and the Dutton Estate.

In May 1944, a Junkers Ju 188 was shot down by a Mosquito nearby and its debris was scattered across the village, including the church wall. Later, the inhabitants had to be evacuated when a bomb fell into the field opposite Manor Farm, and had to be defused and removed by the Royal Engineers. In 1962, the Dutton Estate holdings were sold to seven tenant farmers who retained the land they farmed but sold the remaining woodlands and properties.

== Geography ==
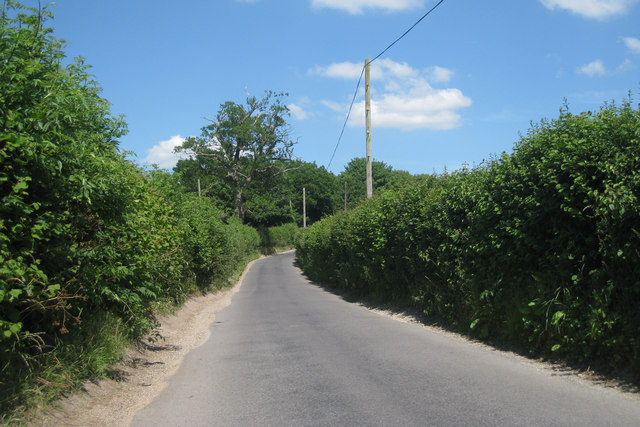
Blanket Street Lane, West Worldham

West Worldham is in the eastern central part of Hampshire, in the southeast of England, 2.1 miles (3.4 km) southeast of Alton and 5.1 miles (8.2 km) by road northwest of Bordon.

In 1862, West Worldham reportedly had an area of 447 acres. The landscape is dominated by farmland and several woods such as Hamble Pits Copse, Wild Duck Copse, Little Wood Copse, Warner's Wood and Pheasant Wood are in the vicinity. There are also rich and dry meadows, as well as greensand. Beyond some slopes is the junction of Oakhanger Stream with River Wey, while the extreme western end of the Weald is situated nearby. Chloritic Marl, characterised as a narrow band at the base of the Chalk Marl, is seen in the lane leading from Alton to West Worldham, and also north-west of Selbourne.

Blanket Street connects the village to Hartley Mauditt just to the southwest and East Worldham, a mile to the northeast. At East Worldham this road meets the B3004 road (Caker's Lane) near The Three Horseshoes. The other road leads to the southwest beyond Little Wood Copse and joins the B3006 road (Selbourne Road). The nearest railway station is Alton, 2.1 miles (3.4 km) northwest of the village.

== Economy ==
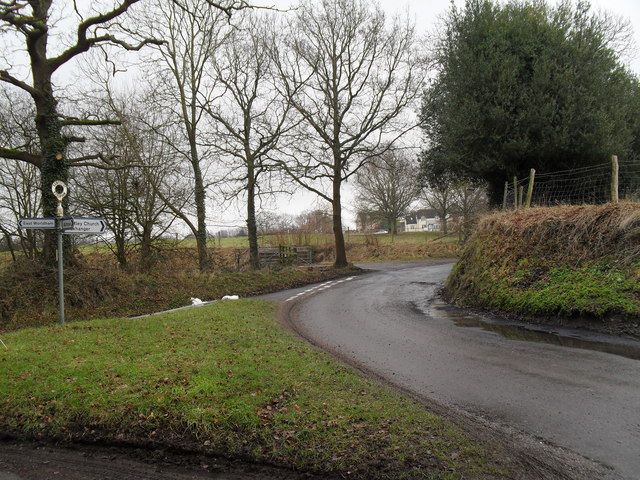
Road from West Worldham to Hartley Mauditt

In 2001 West Worldham had a population of about 50 people, out of 336 people who lived in the Parish of Worldham. Most houses in the area date to the pre-20th century; however in recent times numerous farm buildings have been converted to housing and for industrial purposes. According to the parish website, there are now "two significant industrial developments within the parish".

The local economy is based around agriculture, particularly cattle farming. Beef cattle, sheep, grain crops, and hops are the main sources of income, Farmers from West Worldham traded in Southampton and Alton throughout its history.

Nowadays, most inhabitants are either retired or commute to nearby towns to work. Worldham Golf Course is located just to the north of West Worldham. The Jalsa Salana, an annual Islamic convention held at Oaklands Farm in East Worldham, attracts numerous people from surrounding areas.

== Notable landmarks ==
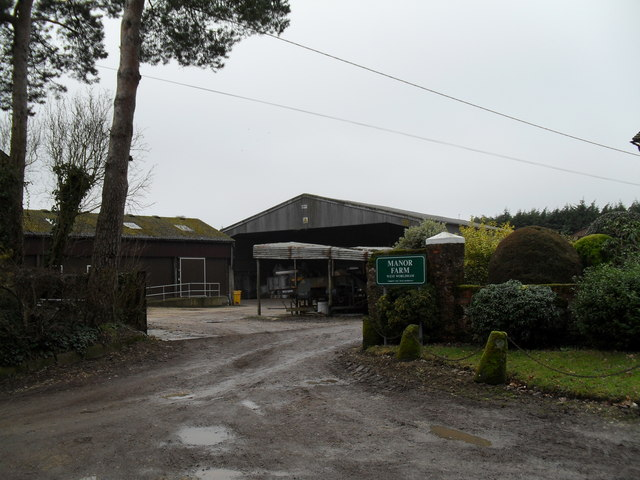
Manor Farm, West Worldham

Manor Farm House is a Grade II listed building and the farm and its cottages are the main feature in West Worldham. It was owned for some time by the Brock family. Manor Farm is one of the UK's twenty-three Feather Down Farms. Pullens Farmhouse is also a Grade II listed building, and although its inscription dates to 1652, it shows medieval characteristics.

Adjacent to Manor Farm is St Nicholas Church, small church dated to the late 12th century, which forms one of eleven churches in the Northanger benefice. It fell into ruin and lost its roof before it was restored in the late Victorian period in 1888. It is a single-cell building, with 2 small lancets on the north side, and contains windows dated to the 15th and 16th century. The two doorways date to the 13th century, and the timber-framed porch on the south side to the 15th century. The interior is described as "plain, with a piscina in the east wall and 2 in the nave, an octagonal font, and 3 wall monuments of the late 18th century." The church became a listed building on 31 July 1963.

== Civil parish ==
In 1931 the parish had a population of 74. On 1 April 1932 the parish was abolished to form "Worldham".
