= Sir Edward Greaves, 1st Baronet =

English physician

Sir Edward Greaves, 1st Baronet (1608 – 11 November 1680), was an English physician.

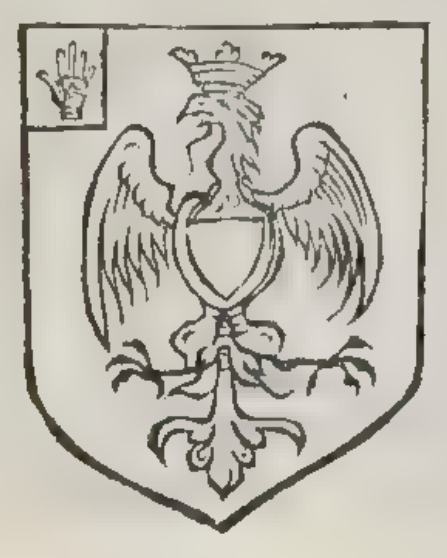
The Coat Armour of Sir Edward Greaves, 1st Baronet, bearing a crowned eagle and the arms of Ulster.

Greaves was the son of John Greaves, rector of Colemore, Hampshire. He was born at Croydon, Surrey, in 1608. His brothers were John Greaves, Nicholas Greaves and Thomas Greaves. He studied at Oxford University, and was elected a fellow of All Souls' College in 1634. After this he studied medicine at Padua University, where in 1636 he wrote some complimentary Latin verses to Sir George Ent on his graduation, and returning to Oxford graduated M.B. 18 July 1640, M.D. 8 July 1641. In 1642, he continued his medical studies at the university of Leyden, and on his return practised physic at Oxford, where, on 14 November 1643, he was appointed Linacre superior reader of physic. In the same year he published Morbus epidemicus Anni 1643, or the New Disease with the Signes, Causes, Remedies &c, an account of a mild form of typhus fever, of which there was an epidemic at Oxford that year, especially in the houses where sick and wounded soldiers were quartered.

Charles I is believed to have created him a baronet on 4 May 1645. Of this creation, the first of a physician to that rank, no record exists, but the accurate Le Neve did not doubt the fact, and explained the absence of enrolment. It has been said that he could have been "a pretend baronet"; he is not mentioned in all the printed books documenting the lists of Baronets, except in the 5th edition of Guillim's Heraldry. He claimed to have been Physician-General to the army of Charles I. With his friend Walter Charleton, Greaves became travelling physician to Charles II, but settled in London in 1653, and was admitted a fellow of the College of Physicians 18 October 1657. Despite the uncertainty surrounding the awarding of his baronetcy, a 1677 official list of the fellows of the college acknowledges his title. He delivered the Harveian oration at the College of Physicians 25 July 1661 (London, 1667, 4to), of which the original manuscript is in the British Library (Sloane MS 302). He says that before Harvey the source of the circulation was as unknown as that of the Nile, and compares England to a heart, whence the knowledge of the circulation was driven forth to other lands. He became physician in ordinary to Charles II, and owned the lands of St Leonard's Forest in Sussex, including that part which became Leonardslee. He married Alicia Nevett (1624–1684), widow of Peter Calf (d. 1668). Greaves lived in Covent Garden, died there on 11 November 1680, and was buried in the church of St. Paul's, Covent Garden. It is unknown if there was a successor to the baronetcy due to the lack of letters patent; that may have indicated if there were any special remainder, it is possible a rightful claimant may be alive.

Baronetage of England
New creation	Baronet (of St Leonard's Forest); 1645–1680	Extinct
