= Thomas Greaves (orientalist) =

English orientalist

Thomas Greaves (1612–1676) was an English orientalist, a contributor to the London Polyglot of Brian Walton.

== Life ==
He was a son of the Rev. John Greaves of Colemore, Hampshire, and brother of John Greaves, Nicholas Greaves and of Sir Edward Greaves. He was educated at Charterhouse School, and was admitted scholar of Corpus Christi College, Oxford, 1627, becoming fellow in 1636, and deputy-reader of Arabic 1637. He stood in for Edward Pocock who was out of the country from 1637 to 1640.

He proceeded B.D. in 1641, and was appointed rector of Dunsby, near Sleaford, in Lincolnshire. He also held another living near London. He made a deposition in 1648 on behalf of his brother, John Greaves, who was ejected from his professorship at Merton College.

He proceeded D.D. in 1661. He was Professor of Sacred Theology (S.T.P., 'Sanctae Theologiae Professor') by the time he was admitted to a prebend in Peterborough Cathedral 23 October 1666, being then rector of Benefield in Northamptonshire. He was obliged to resign this rectory some years before his death on account of an impediment in his speech. The rest of his life was spent at Weldon, Northamptonshire, where he had purchased an estate, and dying there in 1676, he was buried in the chancel of Weldon Church.

== Works ==
His works are:

- De linguae Arabicae utilitate et praestantia (oration held July 19, 1637, but published in 1639).
- Observationes quaedam in Persicam Pentateuchi versionem and Annotationes quaedam in Persicam Interpretationem Evangeliorum, both printed in vol. vi. of the Polyglot Bible, 1647.

He was probably also the author of A Sermon at Rotterdam, 1763, and A brief Summary of Christian Religion. He contemplated a Treatise against Mahometanism, as appears from a letter to his friend Richard Baxter.
