= John Greaves =

English mathematician, astronomer and antiquarian (1602–1652)

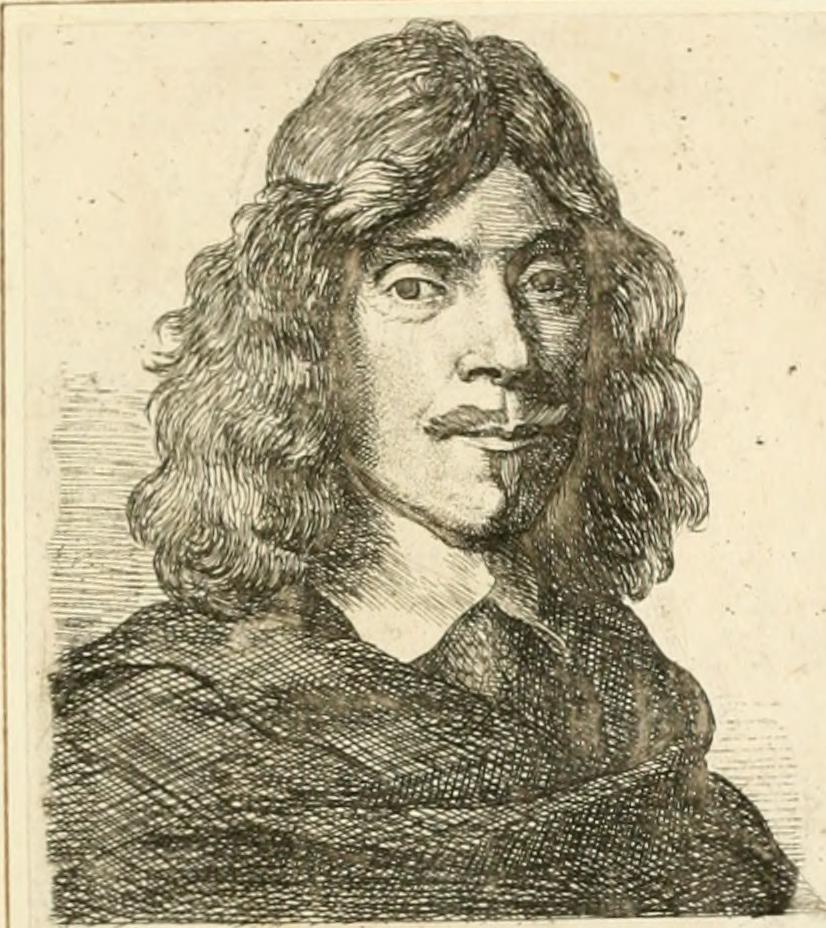
- Greaves in 1650
- Born: 1602 – 8 October 1652
- Occupations: Mathematician, Astronomer & antiquarian

Academic background
- Education: Gresham Professor of Geometry
- Alma mater: Balliol College, Oxford

John Greaves (1602 – 8 October 1652) was an English mathematician, astronomer and antiquarian.

== Education ==
Educated at Balliol College, Oxford, he was elected a Fellow of Merton College in 1624. He studied Persian and Arabic, acquired a number of old books and manuscripts for archbishop William Laud (some still in Merton College Library), and wrote a treatise (in Latin) on the Persian language. He travelled in Italy and the Levant from 1636 to 1640 and made a survey of the Great Pyramid of Giza.

He was Gresham Professor of Geometry at Gresham College, London, and Savilian professor of astronomy at Oxford University, and collected astrolabes and astronomical measuring devices (now in the Museum of the History of Science, Oxford). He was particularly interested in the study of weights and measures, and wrote a treatise on the Roman foot and denarius, and was a keen numismatist. In 1645 he attempted a reform of the Julian calendar, which was not adopted.

During the English Civil War he supported Charles I, who stayed at Merton College while in Oxford, but lost his academic positions at Oxford in 1647 through the animosity of Nathaniel Brent, Warden of Merton College and a Parliamentarian.

== Biography ==
=== Early life ===
He was born in Colemore, near Alresford, Hampshire. He was the eldest son of John Greaves, rector of Colemore, and Sarah Greaves. His brothers were Nicholas Greaves, Thomas Greaves and Sir Edward Greaves, physician to Charles II.

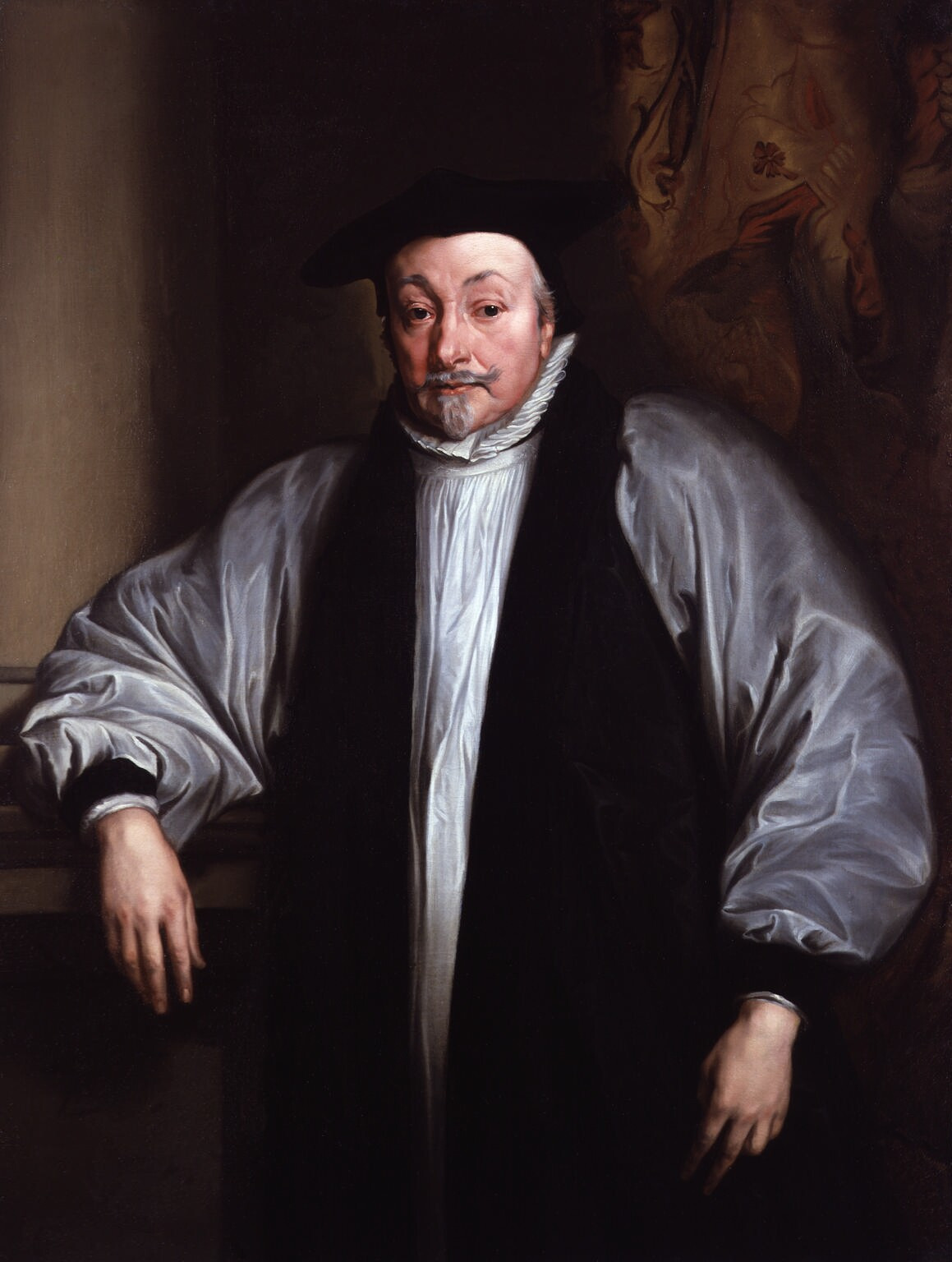
William Laud, patron of Merton College

His father ran a school for sons of the neighbouring gentry, where Greaves began his education. Aged 15, he went to Balliol College, Oxford between 1617–1621, gaining a B.A. degree. In 1624 he was the first of five newly elected Fellows of Merton College, becoming M.A. in 1628. He began to study astronomy and oriental languages, and especially the works of the ancient eastern astronomers. In 1630 Greaves was chosen Gresham Professor of Geometry at Gresham College, London. Through his predecessor, Peter Turner, he later met archbishop William Laud, the chancellor of Oxford University and Visitor (patron) of Merton College. Laud was keen to make English editions of Greek and Arabic authors, and Greaves' later travels abroad involved collecting manuscripts and books for presentation to his new patron.

=== Travels in Italy ===
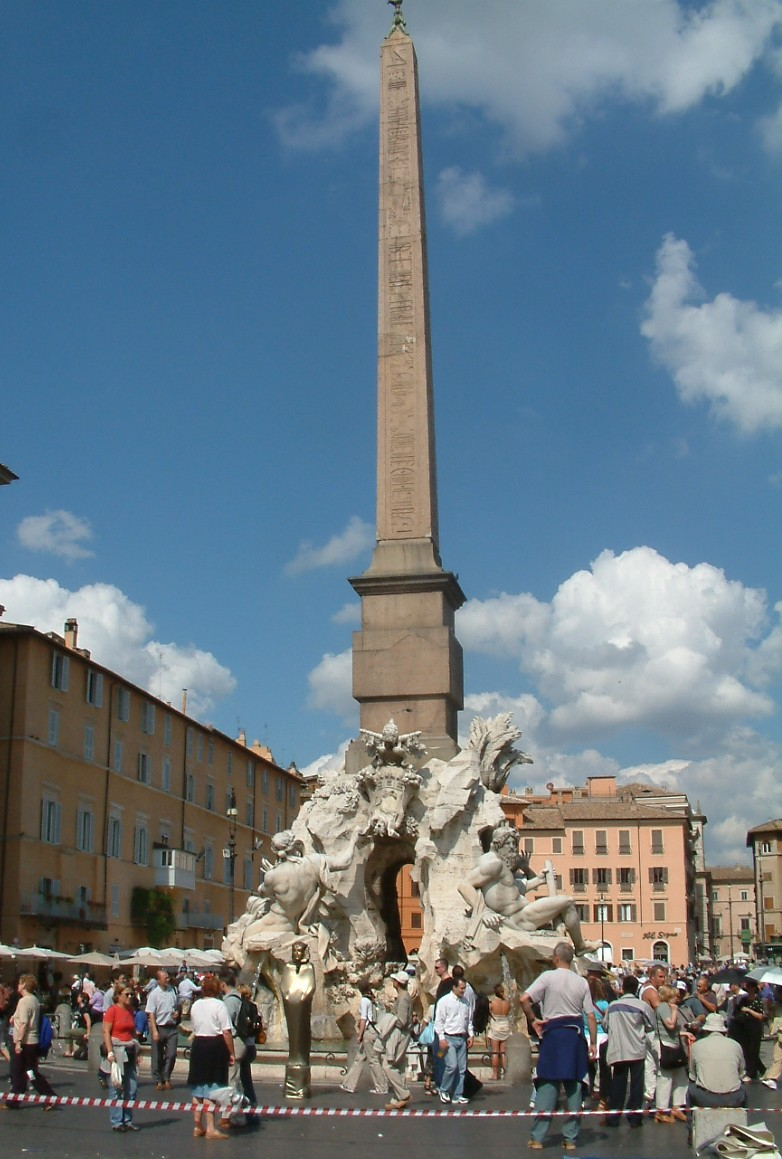
The Obelisk of Domitian, now restored in the Piazza Navona

Greaves enrolled at University of Leyden in 1633, where he became friends with Jacob Golius, professor of Arabic at Leyden. He enrolled at the University of Padua in 1635 along with George Ent, meeting the Dane Johan Rode (John Rhodius), an expert on ancient weights and measures, who also made a commentary on Celsus. A brief return to England was followed by a second European journey; in 1636 he sailed via Livorno (Leghorn) to Rome, dining with Ent on 5 October at the English College, Rome; he also met William Harvey, who was entertained at the college on the 12th, Gasparo Berti, Lucas Holstenius and Athanasius Kircher.

Probably in the same month he met and consulted with the Earl of Arundel's art-collecting agent, William Petty (who dined at the college on 14 October), on the Earl's attempted acquisition of the Obelisk of Domitian, then still lying broken in the Circus of Maxentius. Though "now it is broken into 5 stones", he measured these and including a sketch of the obelisk as hypothetically repaired in his almanac-notebook (Bodleian Library Savile MS 49,1). Though Arundel paid a 60 crown deposit for the obelisk, pope Urban VIII vetoed its export and it was erected by his successor Innocent X above Bernini's Fountain of the Four Rivers in the Piazza Navona.

Greaves toured the Catacombs and made drawings of the Pantheon and Pyramid of Cestius. During his stay in Rome he instituted inquiries into the ancient weights and measures that are among the early classics of metrology.

=== Travels in the Levant ===
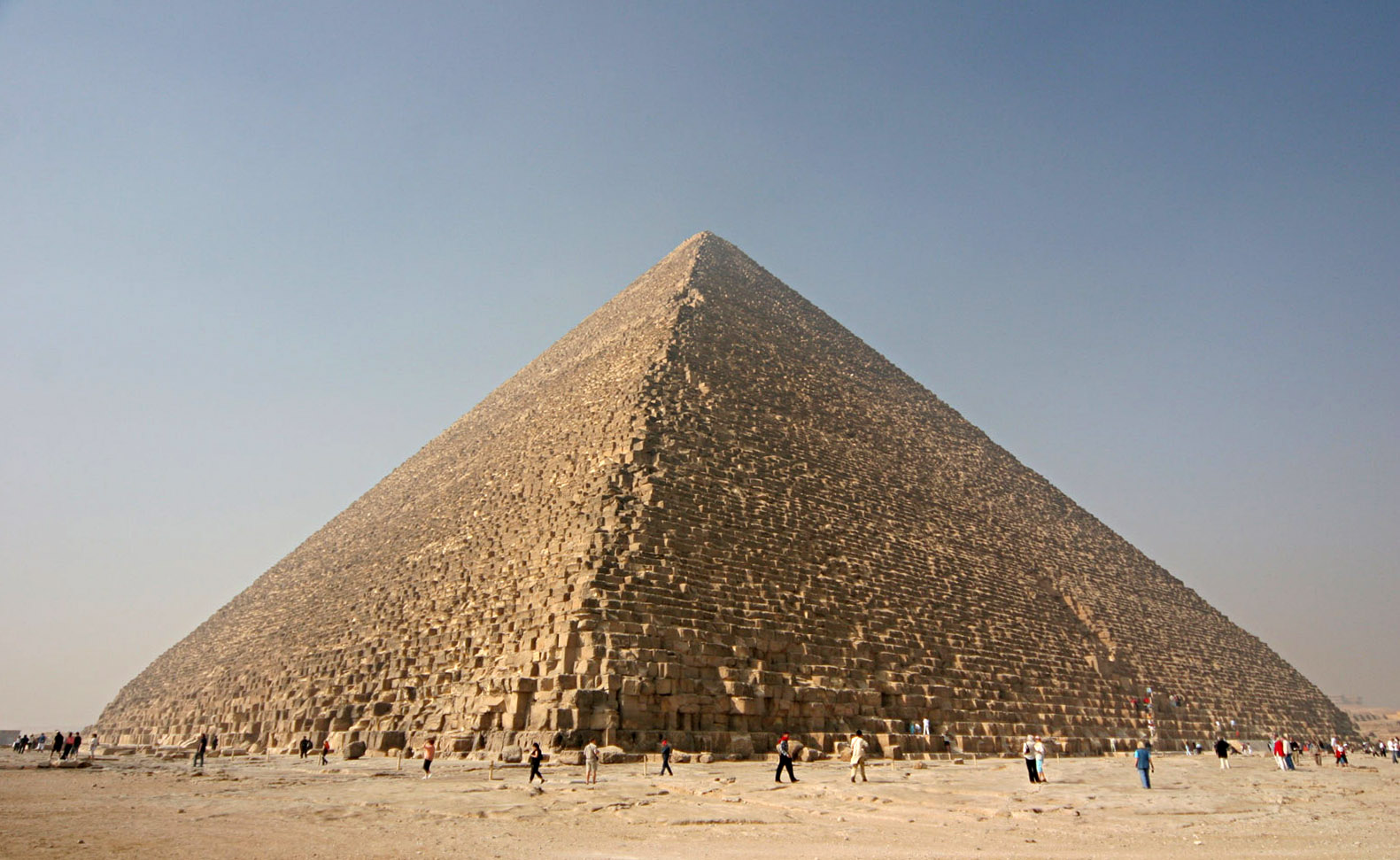
The Great Pyramid of Khufu, surveyed by Greaves in around 1639

In 1637 he made a journey to the Levant, one intention being to fix the latitude of Alexandria where Ptolemy had made his astronomical observations. He sailed from England to Livorno in the company of Edward Pococke; after a brief visit to Rome, he arrived in Istanbul (Constantinople) around April 1638. There he made the acquaintance of the English ambassador Sir Peter Wyche. He procured various manuscripts there, including a copy of Ptolemy's Almagest ("the fairest work I ever saw"). Greaves ended up owning two copies of the Almagest. He was going to have visited the many monastic libraries at Mount Athos, in order to make a catalogue of their MSS and unprinted books. Athos was normally open only to members of the Orthodox church, but thanks to a special dispensation from the Patriarch of Constantinople Cyril Lucaris, Greaves would have had access; but the execution of the patriarch by strangulation in June 1638 for treason against Sultan Murad IV prevented his journey.

Instead, Greaves continued on to Alexandria, where he collected a number of Arabic, Persian and Greek manuscripts. He was an inveterate note-taker, making countless observations in notebooks and on blank pages of other books he bought; he also visited Cairo twice, and made a more accurate survey of the pyramids of Egypt than any traveller who had preceded him. He returned to England in 1640.

=== Calendar reform ===
On the death of John Bainbridge in 1643, Greaves was appointed as Savilian professor of astronomy and senior reader of the Linacre lecture at Oxford, but he was deprived of his Gresham professorship for having neglected its duties. In 1645 he essayed a reformation of the Julian calendar; but although his plan of omitting the bissextile day (29 February) for the next 40 years was approved by the king, the matter was dropped owing to the turbulent times. The Gregorian calendar was not adopted in Britain until 1752.

=== Ejection from Oxford ===
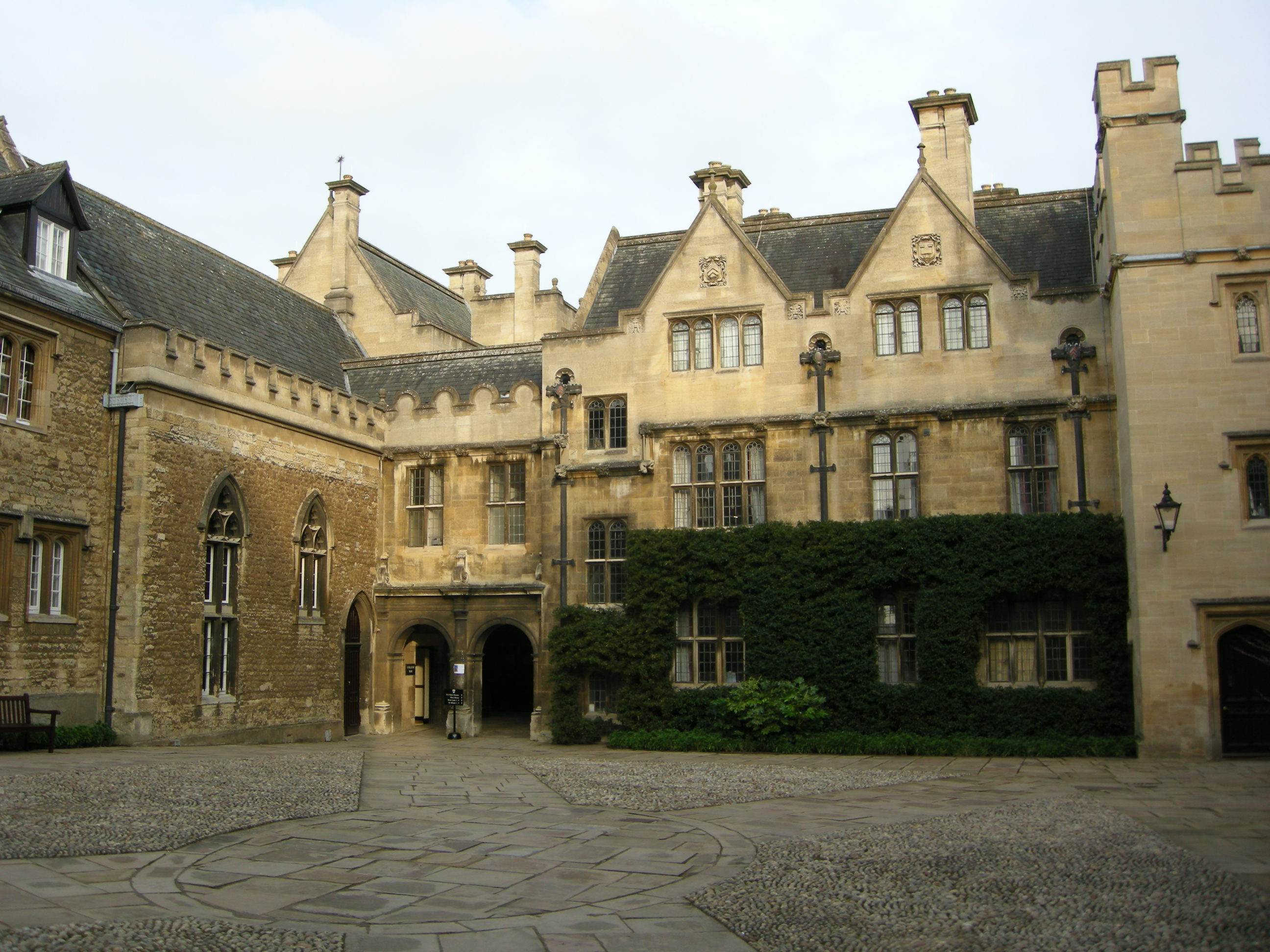
The front quadrangle of Merton College

In 1642 Greaves had been elected subwarden of Merton College. Merton was the only Oxford college to side with the Parliamentarians in the English Civil War, through an earlier dispute in 1638 between Nathaniel Brent, the Warden of Merton, and Greaves' patron William Laud. Brent had been a witness for the prosecution at Laud's 1644 trial. After Laud was executed on 10 January 1645, Greaves drew up a petition for Brent's removal from office; Brent was deposed by Charles I on 27 January.

However, in 1647 a Parliamentary commission (or visitation) was set up "for the correction of offences, abuses, and disorders" in the University of Oxford. Nathaniel Brent was the president of the visitors. After Thomas Fairfax had captured Oxford for the Parliamentarians in 1648 and Brent had returned from London, Greaves was accused of sequestrating the college's plate and funds for king Charles. Despite a deposition from his brother Thomas, Greaves had lost both his Merton fellowship and his Savilian chair by 9 November 1648. Many of his books and MSS disappeared after his rooms were rifled by soldiers, although his friend John Selden managed to recover some of them. However, Greaves was not actually deprived of the professorship until August 1649.

He was succeeded as Savilian Professor of Astronomy in that year by Seth Ward, who ensured that Greaves was paid the arrears (£500) of his salary; Greaves was unlikely to have got his money, since the Savilian professors were paid from the income of lands held in Kent and Essex, which were under control of Parliament (rather than the king). Ward also gave over a considerable amount of his own salary to Greaves.

=== Later life and death ===
But Greaves' private fortune more than sufficed for all his wants until his death; he retired to London, married and occupied his leisure writing and editing books and manuscripts. He died in London aged 50, and was buried in the church of St Benet Sherehog, which was destroyed during the Great Fire of London.

His brother Nicholas Greaves was his executor. He left his cabinet containing his coin collection to Sir John Marsham, and his astronomical instruments to the university, for the use of the Savilian professors. Two of his astrolabes (inscribed by his brother Nicholas) are in the Museum of the History of Science, Oxford. (see External links)

== Greaves' astronomical instruments ==
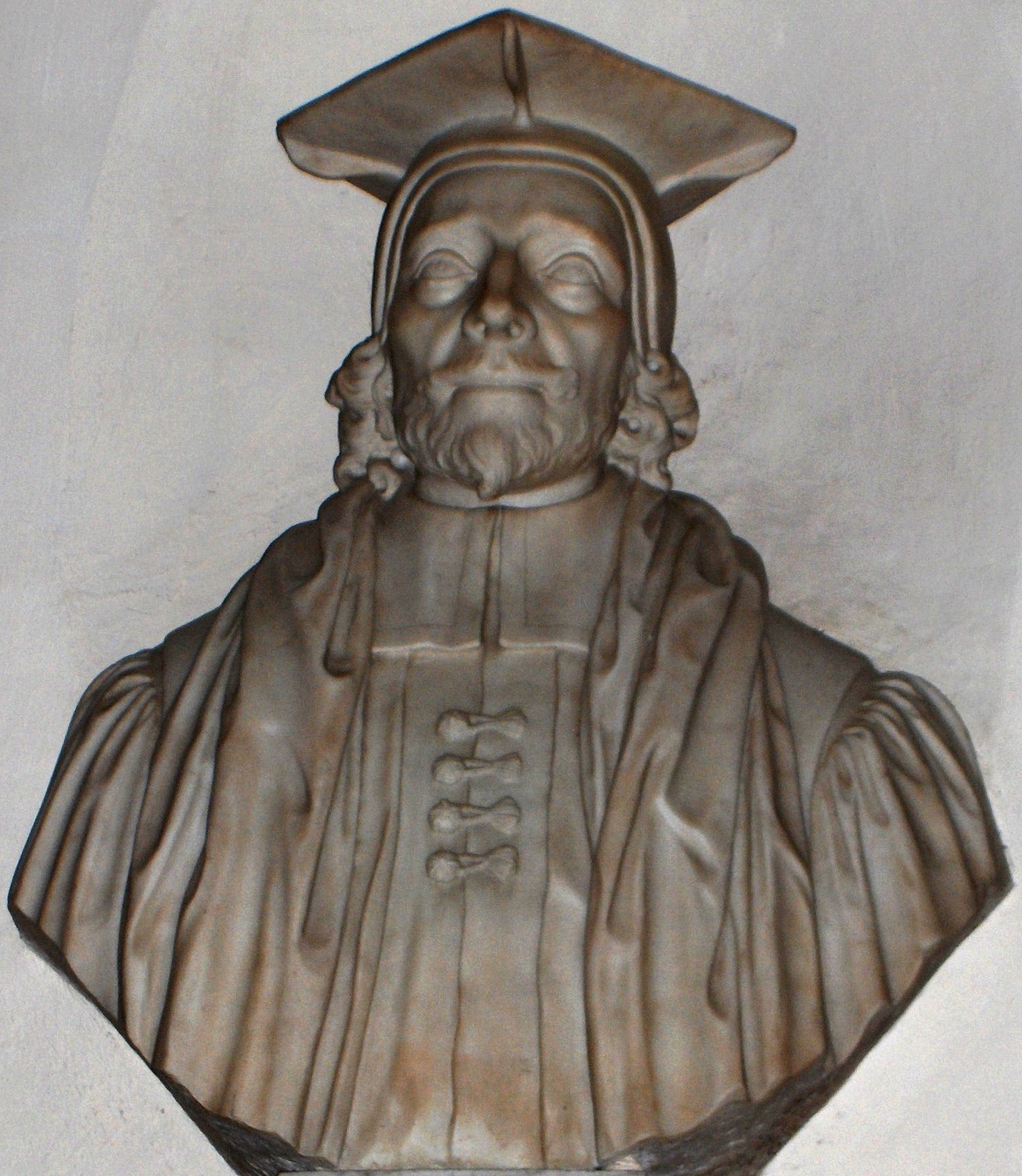
Bust of Edward Pococke in Christ Church Cathedral, Oxford

Greaves had entrusted his will to his friend and fellow-traveller in the Levant, the scholar of Arabic Edward Pococke. The will had originally stipulated that Greaves' collection of astronomical instruments (astrolabes, quadrants, telescopes etc.) was to be left to Oxford university. But by 1649 Greaves (who was staying at Sir John Marsham's house in Rochester, Kent) had become increasingly exasperated with the academic situation at Oxford since the civil war. He wrote to Pococke asking to him to send the will to blot out his gift of his instruments to the university (which had cost him more than a hundred pounds), because he "so far despaired of any future encouragement to learning and ingenuity in Oxford." Greaves repeated his request a few months later, asking Pococke to open the will and strike the words out himself. Pococke seems to have eventually complied with Greaves' wishes, since after Greaves' death in 1652 his executor and brother Nicholas Greaves kept hold of his late brother's collection.

However, when the Commonwealth ended with the resignation of Richard Cromwell in 1659, Nicholas Greaves (in accordance with his late brother's original intent) presented the instruments - suitably inscribed - for the use of the Savilian Professors of Astronomy. They were kept in the professor's room at the top of the Eastern Tower of the Oxford Schools, now the Bodleian Library. A list of them appears in the 1697 Catalogue' of Bodleian manuscripts In 1710 the collection was held in the Museum Savilianum.

The instruments had disappeared by the 1920s when R. T. Gunther, the first curator of the Oxford Museum of the History of Science, made inquiries into their whereabouts. Gunther listed them in his Early Science in Oxford, Vol. 2: Astronomy as "not extant". But in 1936 during the refurbishment of the university Radcliffe Observatory, he was alerted by the Savilian professor of astronomy, H. H. Plaskett, to a chance discovery of "certain old metal bars and plates behind some cases." These turned out to be part of the missing Savilian collection, including a 6 ft 9 in (2.06 m) mural quadrant, and an astrolabe of Queen Elizabeth I which Greaves took on his 1637-40 expedition to the Middle East. Gunther wrote two articles in The Observatory on his findings, one shorter preliminary report (Note: "1937: April 9 meeting of the Royal Astronomical Society". The Observatory. 60 (756): 130–131. 1937. Bibcode:1937Obs....60..117.. (NB Also refers to Gunther's article "The Astrolabe of Queen Elizabeth".) In the first report Gunther seems mystified as to why Nicholas Greaves (who had the living of Welwyn, Hertfordshire) should have had the instruments engraved as a gift from himself: but he was probably unaware of the letters from John Greaves to Pococke mentioned above. Gunther felt it significant that the presentation of the instruments synchronised with the appointment of Christopher Wren to the Savilian chair. Wren didn't in fact get the chair until 1661. Gunther also originally thought that the date 1637 on the quadrant indicated that it had originally belonged to Bainbridge, and Greaves had inherited them: but this is the year when Greaves travelled to the Middle East.) with a fuller appreciation a few months later.

The inscriptions on four of the instruments (including Elizabeth I's astrolabe) read:

1659 Acad. Oxon. in usum praecipue Prof. Savilianorum:
Ex dono Nic Greaves S.T.D.
In memoriam Tho. Bainbridge M.D. Jo Greaves A.M. N. fra: olim Astronomiae Prof. Savil.

Greaves' other, smaller astrolabe didn't surface until 1971, when it was discovered by Gunther's son A. E. Gunther at his mother's house. The cataloguer of the OMHS attributes this to an oversight on Gunther's part. The inscription around the edge of the limb reads: '1659 . Acad. Oxon. Ex dono Nic Greaves. S.T.D.' It doesn't appear in Gunther's 1932 magnum opus, Astrolabes of the World.

== Works ==
Besides his papers in the Philosophical Transactions of the Royal Society, the principal works of Greaves are:

- Pyramidographia, or a Description of the Pyramids in Ægypt (1646)
- A Discourse on the Roman Foot and Denarius (1647)

These were reprinted (together with a biographical notice of the author) as part of

- Greaves, John (1737) Miscellaneous works of Mr. John Greaves Vol. I and Vol. II. London: Published by Dr Thomas Birch, printed by J. Hughes for J. Brindley and C. Corbett. This also contains a reprint of
- Withers, Robert (ed. John Greaves) A Description of the Grand Signour’s Seraglio; or Turkish Emperours Court (1653) London: Printed for Jo. Ridley, at the Castle in Fleet-street by Ram-Alley.

- Pyramidographia was translated into French and published in Relations de divers voyages curieux, qui n'ont point esté publiees... (1664) Paris: Jacques Langlois, imprimeur ordinaire du Roy, pp. i-xxv [pdf 20-52], including Greaves' detailed drawings of the pyramids and mummies.
- Elementa linguae Persicae, authore Johanne Gravio: item anonymus Persa de siglis Arabum & Persarum astronomicis (1649) (Elements of the Persian language)

Translations into Latin:

- Chorasmiae et Mawaralnahrae hoc est Regionum extra fluvium Oxum. (1650). A description of Khwarezm and Mawarannahr (Transoxiana) translated from the Arabic MS of Abu'l-Fida, with tables of latitude and longitude for the principal towns. Dedicated to Bishop Ussher. A copy is in Merton College Library.
- Abulfedae Peninsulam Arabum. This is an edited translation of part of Abu'l-Fida's History.
- Binae Tabulae Geographicae, two tables of geographical latitudes and longitudes translated from the Persian of Nasir al-Din al-Tusi and Ulugh Beg

The above three works appeared in Hudson, John (1712): Geographiae Veteris Scriptores Graeci Minores Vol. III, Oxon. (in Latin)

- Lemmata Archimedis, apud Graecos et Latinos iam pridem desiderata, e vetusto codice manuscripto Arabico. This is a translation of part of Nasir al-Din al-Tusi's edition of the so-called Middle Books. Greaves' unpublished MS was revised and amended after his death by Samuel Foster:
- Foster, Samuel (1659). Miscellanea sive lucubrationes mathematicae. London: printed by R. & W. Leybourn, published by John Twysden.

The following book may not be by John Greaves, although his name appears on the title-page. First printed (posthumously) in 1706 for G. Sawbridge, and again in 1727, with a second edition in 1745, it discusses Greaves' findings and measurements of the Roman foot and denarius.

- Greaves, John (1745) [1706]. The origin and antiquity of our English weights and measures discover'd... 2nd edition. London: Printed for W. Payne and W. Bathoe.

== See also ==
- List of Gresham Professors of Geometry
- Pyramid inch
