= Pyramidographia =

1646 book by John Greaves

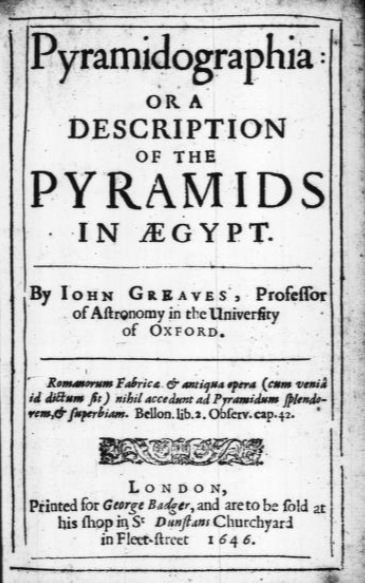
- Title page for Pyramidographia (1646)
- Author: John Greaves
- Language: English
- Subject: History
- Publisher: George Badger
- Publication date: 1646
- Publication place: Kingdom of England
- Media type: Print (Hardcover and Paperback)

The Pyramidographia was a seminal historical book written by the English author John Greaves in the year 1646 about the Pyramids of Giza.

== See also ==
- John Greaves
- Pyramid of Khafre
