= Church of St Peter ad Vincula, Colemore =

Coordinates: 51.0719°N 0.9937°W

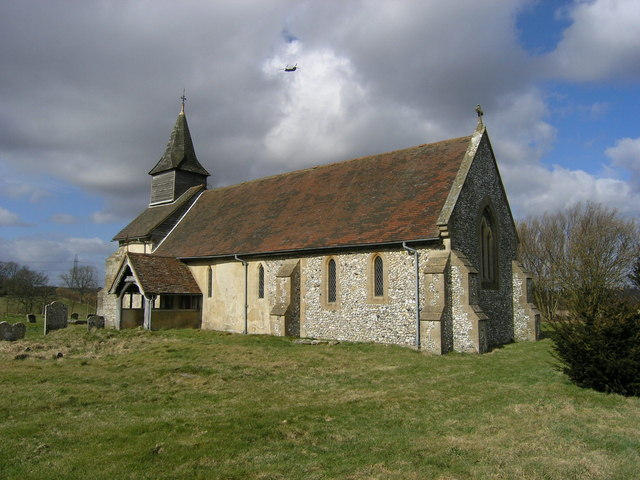
- Church of St Peter ad Vincula, Colemore, from the southeast

- Location in Hampshire
- OS grid reference: SU 706 308
- Location: Colemore, Hampshire
- Country: England
- Denomination: Anglican
- Website: Churches Conservation Trust

Architecture
- Functional status: Redundant
- Heritage designation: Grade II*
- Designated: 16 March 1952
- Architectural type: Church
- Style: Norman, Gothic

Specifications
- Length: 60 feet (18 m)
- Width: 15 feet (5 m)
- Materials: Rendered rubble and flint Sandstone dressings Tiled roof

The Church of St Peter ad Vincula is a redundant Anglican church in the village of Colemore, Hampshire, England. It is recorded in the National Heritage List for England as a designated Grade II* listed building, and is under the care of the Churches Conservation Trust. Colemore is located some 6 miles (10 km) south of Alton to the east of the A32 road.

== History ==
Colemore is mentioned in the Domesday Book of 1086, and a church has been on the site since the 10th century. The present church dates from the 12th century. However, by 1308 its fabric was "in a ruinous" condition" and the bishop ordered that repairs should be undertaken. By the end of the century the church was under the control of Waverley Abbey in Surrey. By 1463 it was again in a ruinous condition, and again the bishop had to intervene; the church was put in good order again by July 1464. But its condition had deteriorated again by 1612; a new roof was built and a bellcote added. At this time the church had a cruciform plan, but in 1669 the parishioners considered that the interior was too dark, and they petitioned the bishop for the disused and ruinous south transept to be removed. The petition was granted, and during the following year the transept was demolished.

Again by 1845 the church was in a bad condition and Owen Carter, a Winchester architect, was commissioned to carry out repairs and improvements; the latter included inserting new windows, paving the nave and replacing the pews. By 1866 the bellcote was insecure and it was replaced by a new one with a spirelet, the architect being John Colson, also of Winchester. Further improvements and repairs were carried out in the 1870s. In the 20th century, the church had deteriorated yet again. The parish was united with that of East Tisted. The church was declared redundant on 17 November 1972 and was vested in the Churches Conservation Trust on 6 September 1974. Further repairs have since been carried out. The church remains consecrated and occasional services are held in it.

== Architecture ==
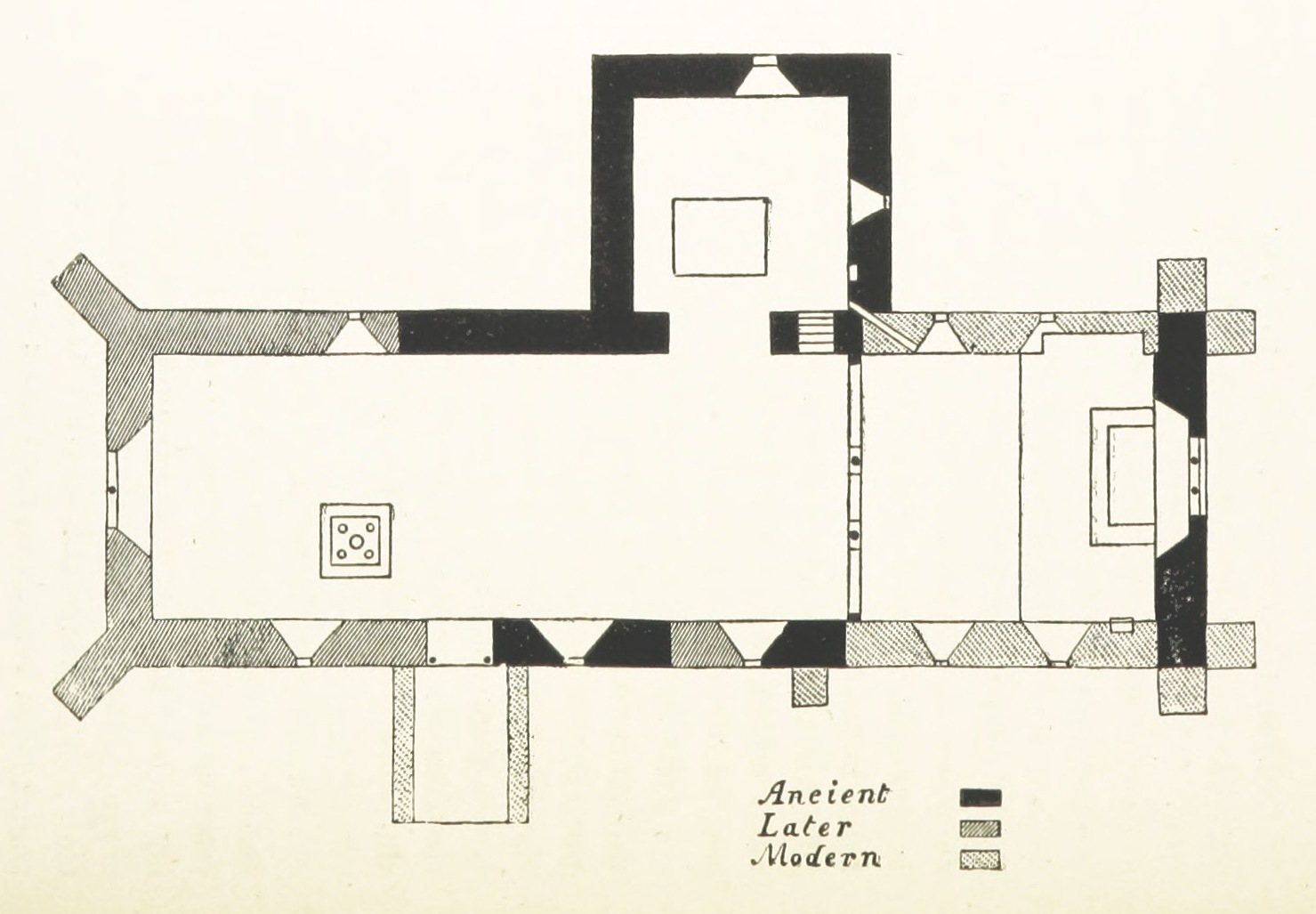
Floor Plan

=== Exterior ===
The plan of the church consists of a nave with a south porch and a north transept, a chancel, and a west bellcote. The walls of the nave are constructed in rendered rubble, and the chancel and buttresses are in flint. The dressings are in sandstone and the roofs are tiled. The bellcote is shingled and it has a broach spire. The windows in the west and south walls of the nave date from the 14th century, and the north wall contains a 12th-century lancet window. The transept has a 12th-century doorway in its west wall, a 12th-century window in the north wall, and an 11th-century window in the east wall. In the north wall of the chancel is a Norman window and a new window that was added in 1845. The east window has three lights; it was inserted in the 15th century and altered in the 19th century.

=== Interior ===
The transept arch is Norman. Between the nave and chancel is a 16th-century wooden screen. In the east wall of the transept is a piscina and a squint, and in the south wall are the remains of a rood staircase. There is another piscina in the south wall of the chancel. In the north wall of the chancel is a recess that originally contained an Easter Sepulchre. The floor of the chancel contains ledger stones commemorating former rectors of the parish, and from its ceiling hang two chandeliers. The font dates from the 12th century. It is made from Purbeck marble and consists of a square bowl supported by a central drum and columns at the corners. The drum is carved on two sides with arcades, on one side with scallops, and on the other side with an interlocking pattern. The oak lectern dates from 1874.The stained glass in the east window is by Kempe, and depicts Saint Peter in chains, the Resurrection, and Saint John. Two bells hang from beneath the bellcote at the west end, one cast in about 1380 at Wokingham, and the other in 1627 by Ellis Knight of Reading. On the walls are memorials dated 1692, 1748 and 1814.

== See also ==
- List of churches preserved by the Churches Conservation Trust in South East England
