= Priors Dean =

Hamlet in Hampshire, England

Coordinates: 51.06149°N 0.96246°W

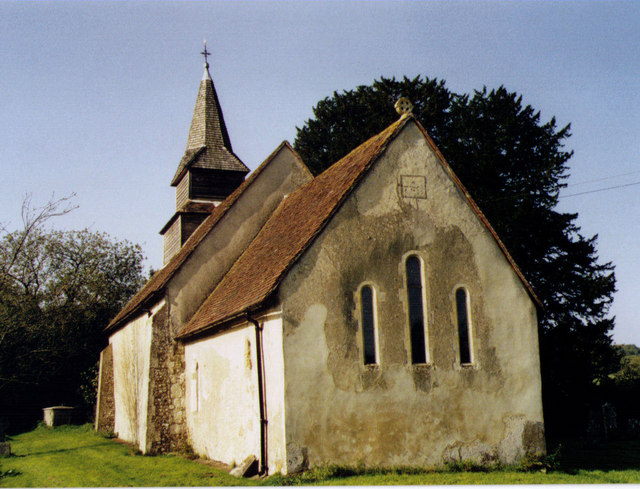
- Priors Dean Church

- Location within Hampshire
- OS grid reference: SU727296
- Civil parish: Colemore and Priors Dean
- District: East Hampshire
- Shire county: Hampshire
- Region: South East
- Country: England
- Sovereign state: United Kingdom
- Post town: Petersfield
- Postcode district: GU32
- Police: Hampshire and Isle of Wight
- Fire: Hampshire and Isle of Wight
- Ambulance: South Central
- UK Parliament: East Hampshire

Priors Dean is a hamlet in the civil parish of Colemore and Priors Dean, in the East Hampshire district, in the county of Hampshire, England. It is in the Hampshire Downs about 3 miles (5 km) west of Liss and about 4 miles (6.4 km) north of Petersfield. It is a deserted medieval village first mentioned in the 1100s. Until 1932 it was a separate parish. The nearest railway station is at Liss.

== History ==
The village first shows some signs of settlement in the Neolithic with flint tools and pottery found in the vicinity of the village. Bronze Age Burial mounds also lie to the northeast of the Church.

Roman pottery and other finds were also whilst field walking in the 1970s and 1980s although not in a large enough quantity to suggest settlement.

The village is first mentioned during the reign of Henry 2 in 1154–1189 as ‘Dene’ deriving from the Old English ‘denu’ meaning valley.

The village came under the possession of the Southwick Priory in 1203 giving it its prefix.

The Black Death arrived in the village in 1348 after three consecutive years of reduced harvest, and devastated the population.The main site of archaeological importance in the village is the deserted medieval village whose extent is not completely known, but likely covers the immediate area around the Church. No full investigation of the site has been done as to date and hence the reason for desertion is unknown. East Hampshire has a large number of abandoned villages, some abandoned during the 1300s thanks to the plague, and others due to more peaceful means like water access difficulties like Abbotstone. Neighbouring Colemore was also abandoned and hasn't seen archaeological investigation either.

In 1931 the civil parish had a population of 97. On 1 April 1932 the parish was abolished and merged with Colemore to form "Colemore and Priors Dean".

== Church ==
The small church which now stands alone is all that is left of the medieval village. Its origins are in the early Norman period around 1120–30 or potentially 11th-century; either late Saxon or early Norman of which some architectural details still remain. For example, the sandstone entrance has a typical 12th Century zig-zag decoration. A Yew Tree in the church ground is estimated at about a thousand years of age.

The church has no known dedication.

Medieval details are well preserved like the 13th and 14th century windows on the south wall the first of which has been long since filled in.

The church was restored in 1856, when the Norman revival chancel arch was built and the bell turret and spire were added. Inside the church are several 17th-century monuments.

It is a Grade II* listed building.

== Manor Houses ==
There are two manor houses in the Priors Dean area.

=== Priors Dean Manor House ===
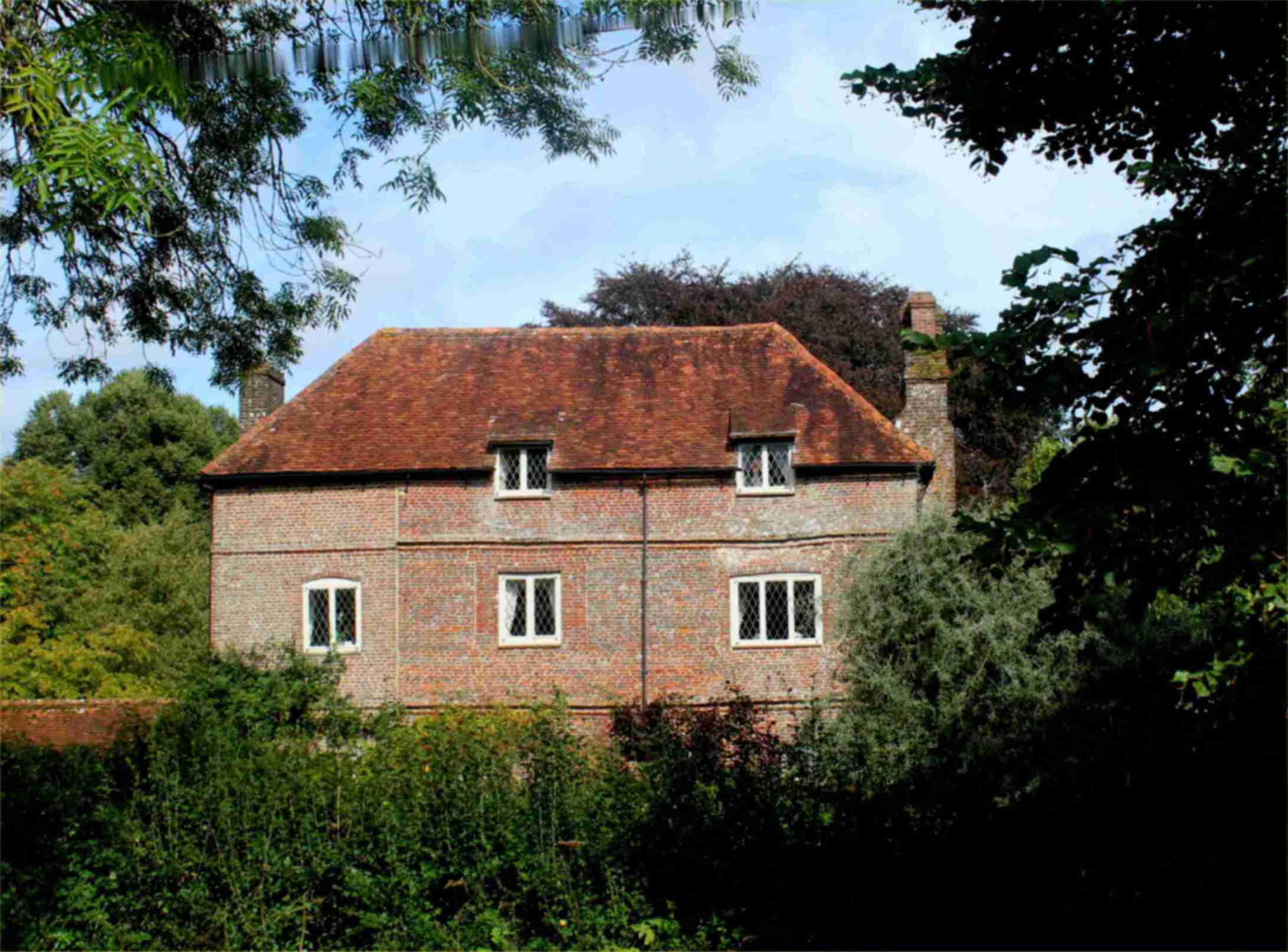
Priors Dean Manor House from the churchyard

This is just north of Priors Dean church, and is a 17th-century brick building with 18th-, late 19th- and early 20th-century alterations.

=== Goleigh Manor House ===
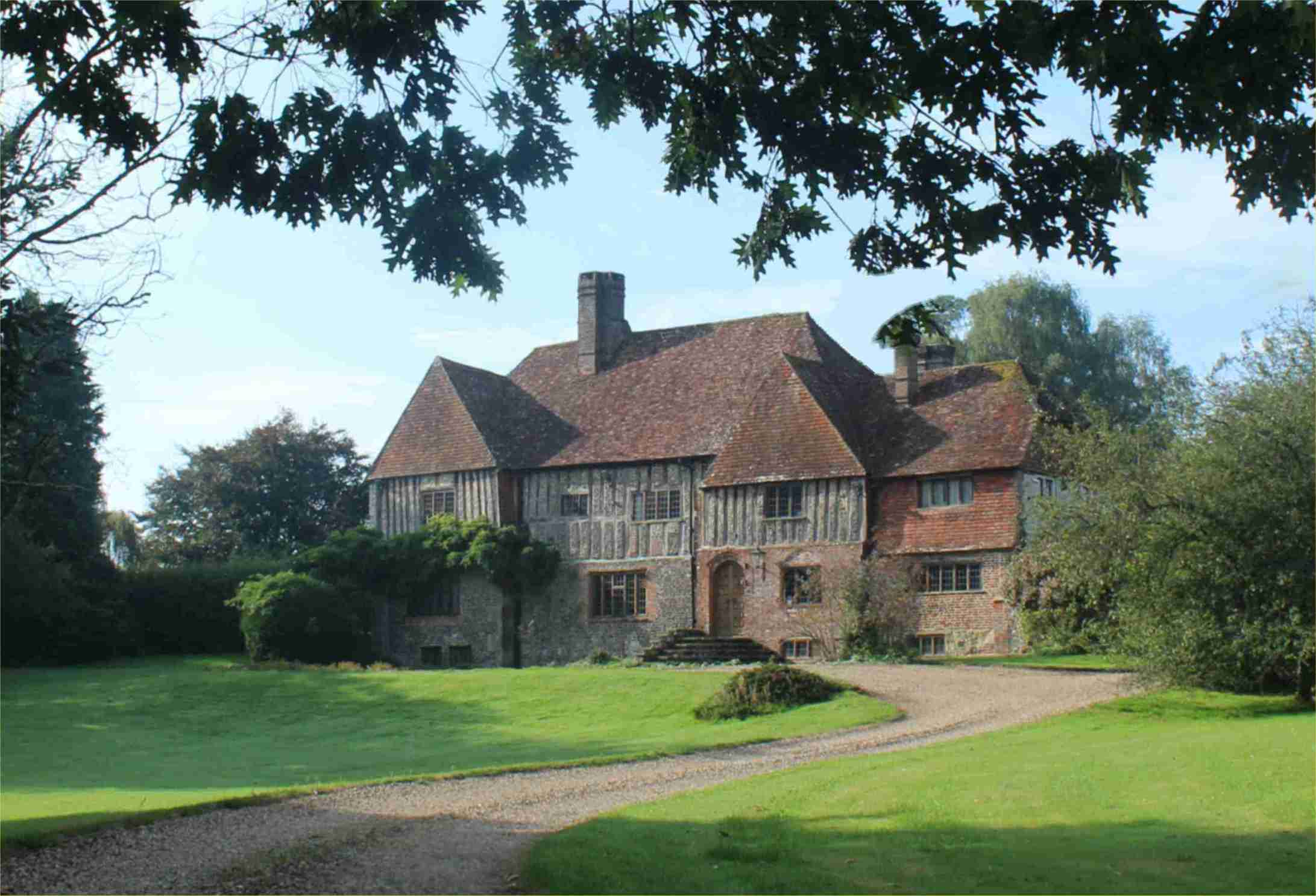
Goleigh Manor House, view from the road

This is about 2 miles (3.2 km) north of Priors Dean, south of the road to Newton Valence, and was built in 1479.
