= Hartley Mauditt =

Village in Hampshire, England

Coordinates: 51.11983°N 0.94051°W

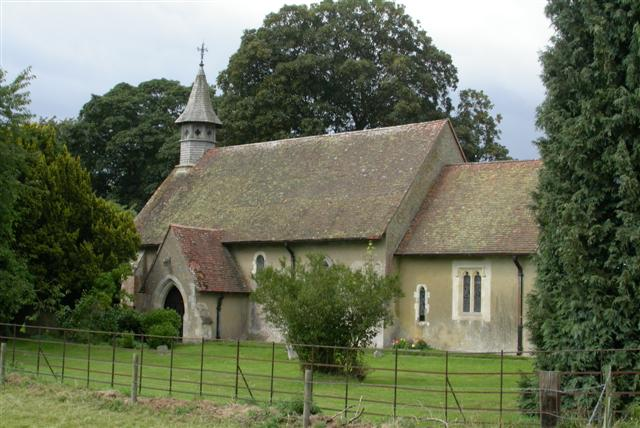
- St Leonard's church

- Location within Hampshire
- OS grid reference: SU742361
- Civil parish: Worldham
- District: East Hampshire
- Shire county: Hampshire
- Region: South East
- Country: England
- Sovereign state: United Kingdom
- Post town: Alton
- Postcode district: GU34
- Police: Hampshire and Isle of Wight
- Fire: Hampshire and Isle of Wight
- Ambulance: South Central
- UK Parliament: East Hampshire

Hartley Mauditt is an abandoned village in the East Hampshire district of Hampshire, England. It is 1.2 miles (1.9 km) south of the village of East Worldham, and 2.6 miles (4.2 km) southeast of Alton, just east of the B3006 road. It is in the civil parish of Worldham. The nearest railway station is 2.5 miles (4.0 km) northwest of the village, at Alton.

The settlement appears to have been uninhabited since the 18th century, save for a couple of scattered cottages. Dating from the 12th century, St Leonard's church stands as the only remaining building of the former village.

== Geography ==
Hartley Mauditt is mainly agricultural of some 1,400 acres (570 ha) with several farms.

The medieval village was larger than present housing which now consists of the parish church of St Leonard and a few houses to the north of the church. These include a 17th-century thatched cottage, a rectory, and a house which was the village school on the parish boundary adjoining West Worldham.

== History ==
Hartley Mauditt was first documented in the Domesday Book (1086) as "Herlege" (meaning hartland or woodland); "Hartley" signifies a pasture for deer. The manor had been granted to William de Maldoit (by corruption rendered Mauditt) by William the Conqueror.

In the late 1300s it was in the possession of John of Gaunt, the Duchy of Lancaster, then the Crown.

In 1603 it was owned by Nicholas Steward (1547-1633) the MP for Cambridge University.

In 1790, the 4th Baronet of Hartley Mauditt, Sir Simeon Henry Stuart, sold the manor to Henry Bilson-Legge. Bilson-Lagge's son son pulled down the manor house in 1798, possibly because it was in a poor state and would have been expensive to re-furbish. After the demolition of the manor house, the village declined.

Today, the church is one of the few remaining buildings.

On 1 April 1932 the parish was incorporated into the larger parish of Worldham.

== Parish church ==
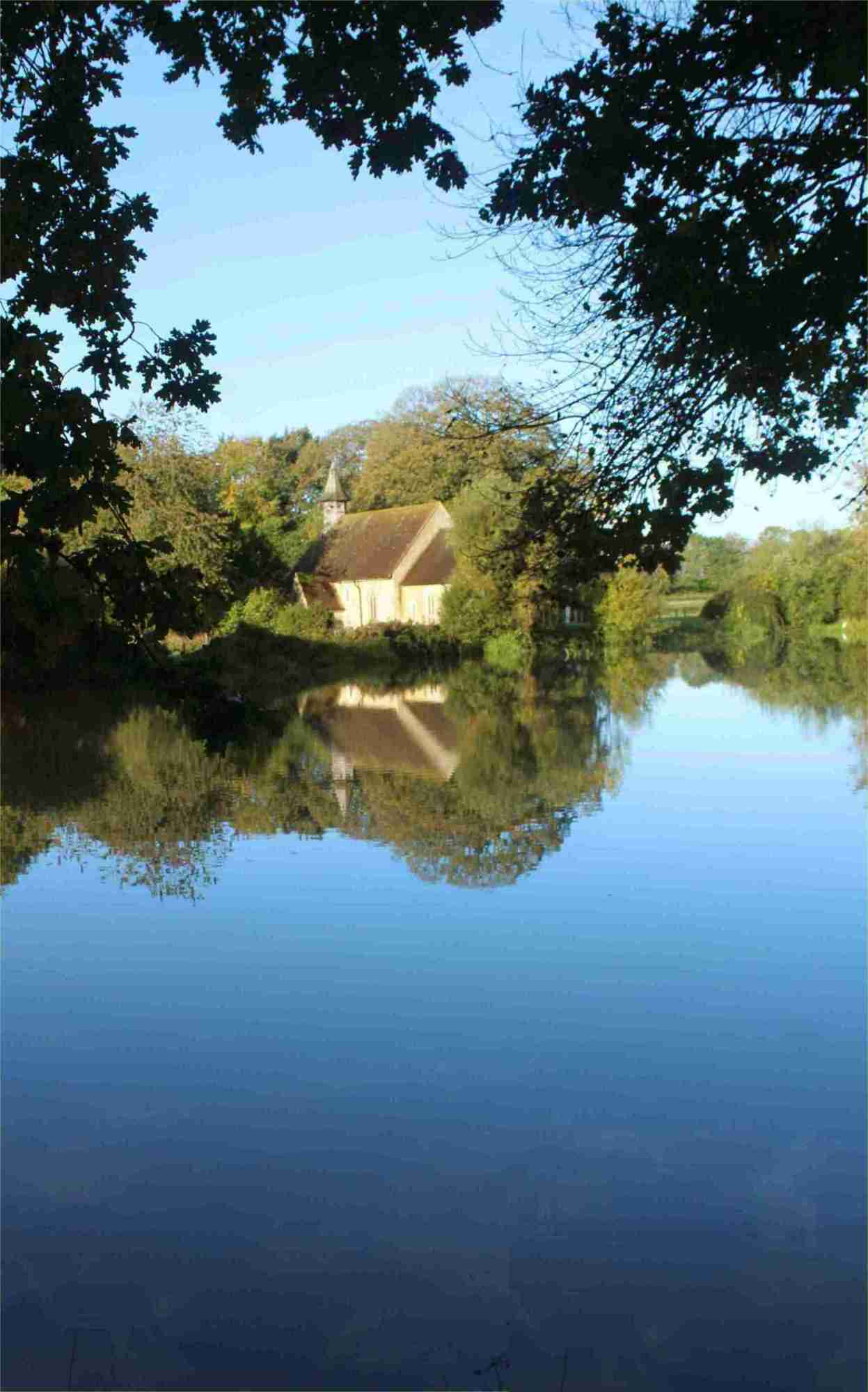
St Leonards church from the S

St Leonard's church is a remaining building from the pre-18th century village. It is on the West side of a lake, as seen in the picture.
