= St Leonard's Church, Hartley Mauditt =

Coordinates: 51.119294°N 0.940381°W

St Leonard's Church
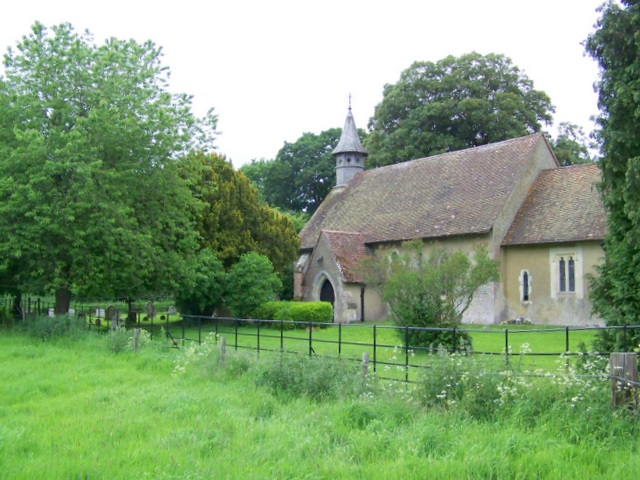
- St Leonard's Church

- Location within Hampshire
- OS grid reference: SU 74297 36105
- Location: Hartley Mauditt,
- Country: England
- Denomination: Anglican

History
- Founded: Early 12th century

Architecture
- Functional status: Active
- Architectural type: Church
- Style: Gothic

Specifications
- Materials: Stone

Administration
- Province: Canterbury
- Diocese: Winchester

Clergy
- Bishop: Bishop of Winchester

St Leonard's Church is a Church of England parish church in the hamlet of Hartley Mauditt, East Hampshire district of Hampshire, England. All that is left of the hamlet is the 12th-century church, the foundations of a manor house, and a large pond, Hartley Pond, which lies opposite the church on the other side of the road. The church is dedicated to St Leonard.

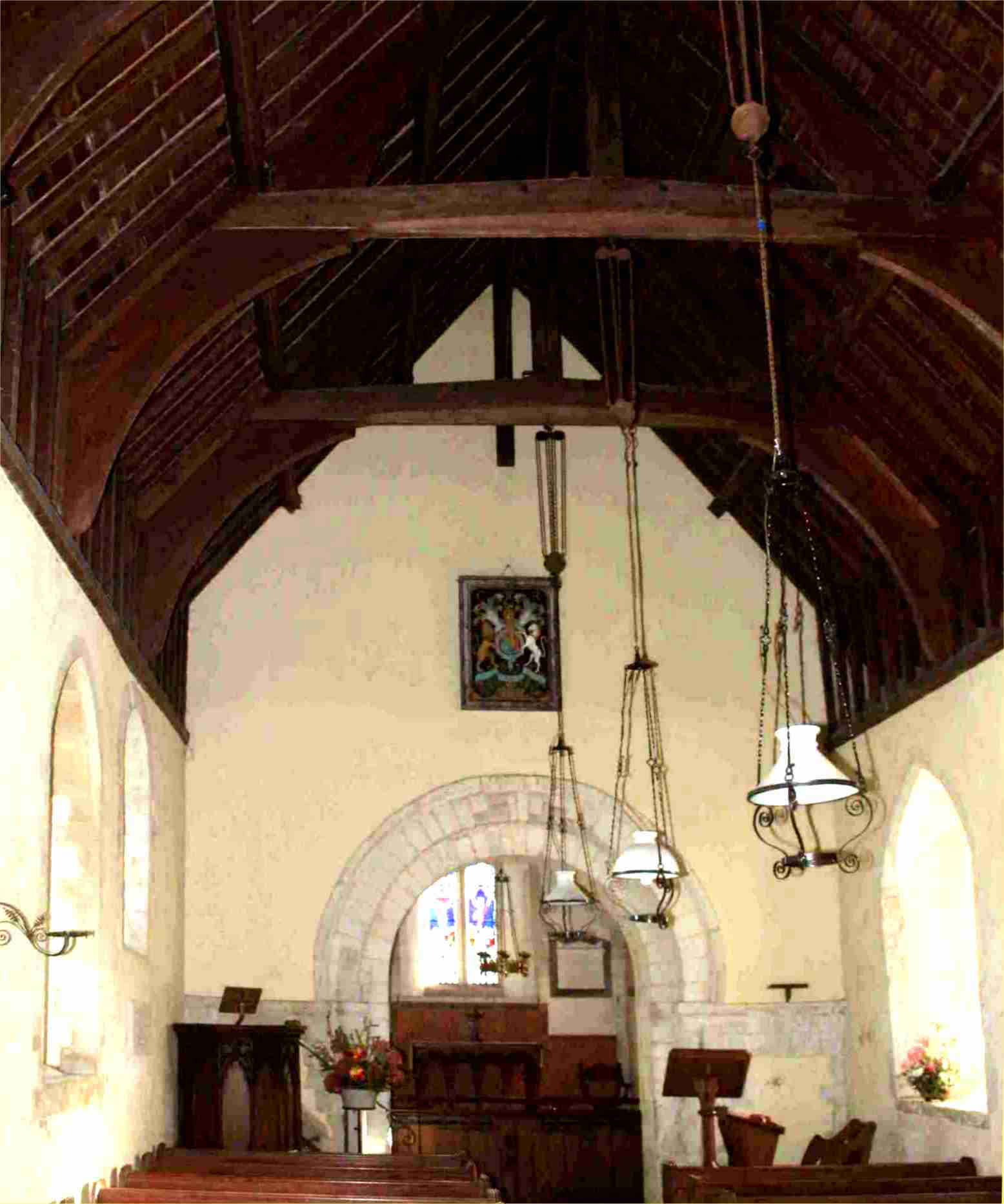
St Leonard's inside, looking east

== History ==
The small church was constructed after the Norman Conquest, but its original simplicity was lost with subsequent workmanship, which was out of character with the style of the original building. It was probably built by the de Mauditt family between 1100 and 1125. It was restored and a bell turret on the west gable was added in 1853–4.

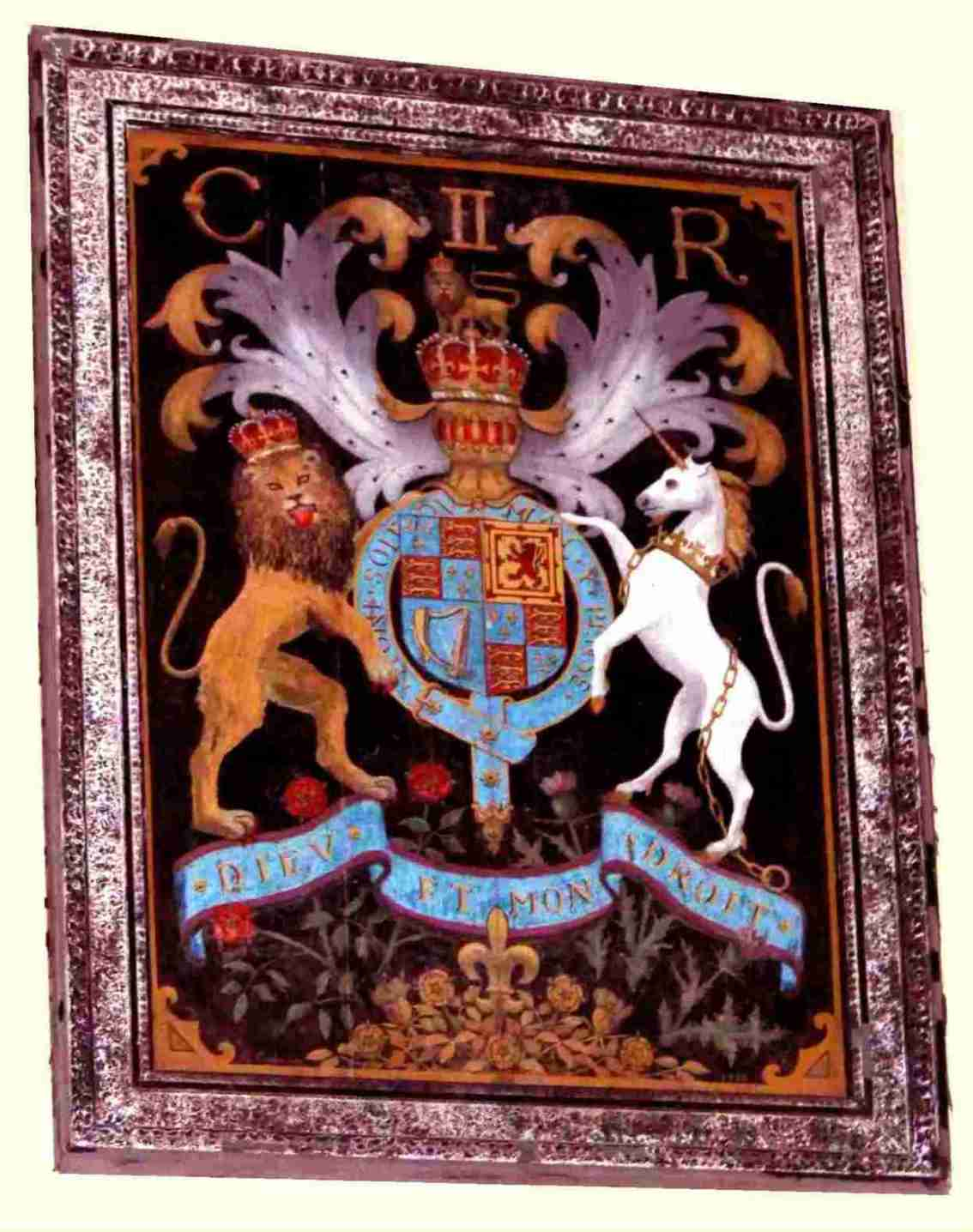
Painting in St Leonard's with CIIR at the top

== Architecture and fittings ==
St Leonard's consists of a nave, chancel, and south porch. The 13th century chancel contains some ancient monuments of the Stuart family.

The chancel arch separating the small chancel from the larger nave is a rare example of the horseshoe form. Some good tiles on the chancel floor are notable.

There are 34 tiles set in two lines on the chancel floor with seven designs.

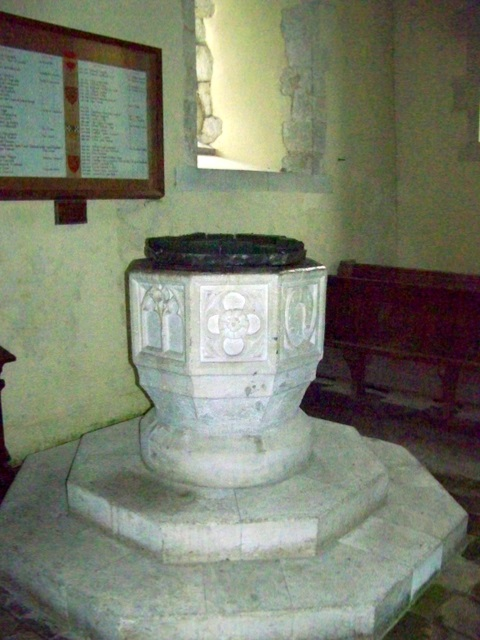
St Leonard's font.

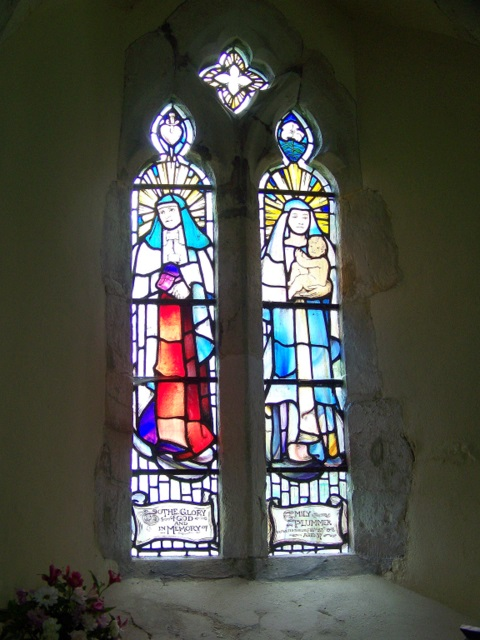
St Leonard's stained glass windows.

On the top of the East wall of the Nave above the chancel arch is a painting of a Lion and Unicorn with the initials "CIIR" (Charles the Second Rex) at the top. Charles the second reigned from 1660 to 1685.

The south doorway dates from the end of the 12th century.

The octagonal font is of Decorated Period style, 15th century.

Several of the windows contain stained glass.
