= Gabriel Towerson =

Gabriel Towerson (1635?–1697) was an English clergyman and theological writer.

== Life ==
He was the son of William Towerson, and probably was born in London about 1635. He was educated first at St Paul's School. He then went to The Queen's College, Oxford, where he was Pauline exhibitioner from 1650 to 1659. He matriculated on 27 February 1651, graduating B.A. on 17 June 1654 and M.A. on 21 April 1657.

In 1657 his father petitioned Richard Cromwell, then Chancellor of the University of Oxford, to use his influence with the Warden and Fellows of All Souls' College to admit his son to one of the vacant fellowships. Towerson obtained his fellowship in 1660, and received the college rectory of Welwyn in Hertfordshire on the deprivation of Nicholas Greaves by the Act of Uniformity 1662. He was admitted on 31 October 1662, and retained the living until his death. He was created D.D. by Archbishop William Sancroft on 1 February 1678, and was presented to the rectory of St Andrew Undershaft, London, on 20 April 1692.

He died on 14 October 1697, and was buried at Welwyn. Towerson left his property to be equally divided among his seven children.

== Works ==
Towerson published:

- ‘A brief Account of some Expressions in the Creed of Saint Athanasius’ (anon.), Oxford, 1663.
- ‘Explication of the Decalogue,’ London, 1676, reissued 1680, 1681, 1685.
- ‘Explication of the Apostle's Creed,’ London, 1678, 1685.
- ‘Explication of the Lord's Prayer,’ London, 1680, 1685.
- ‘Of the Sacraments in General,’ London, 1686, 1687, 1688.
- ‘Of the Sacrament of Baptism,’ London, 1687.
- ‘Of the Sacrament of the Lord's Supper,’ London, 1688.
- ‘A Sermon concerning Vocal and Instrumental Music in the Church,’ London, 1696.
- ‘The Relative Duties of Husbands and Wives,’ and ‘The Relative Duties of Masters and Servants,’ in vol. iv. of ‘Tracts of Anglican Fathers,’ London, 1841–2.

‘An Explication of the Catechism of the Church of England’ (consisting of the above explications and remarks on the sacraments) was published in 1676, and again in 1685, etc. He contributed English verses to Britannia Rediviva, Oxford, 1660, and to Epicedia Academiæ Oxoniensis in Obitum Serenissimæ Mariæ Principis Aurasionensis, Oxford, 1661.
