= East Worldham =

Village and parish in Hampshire, England

Coordinates: 51.13702°N 0.93247°W

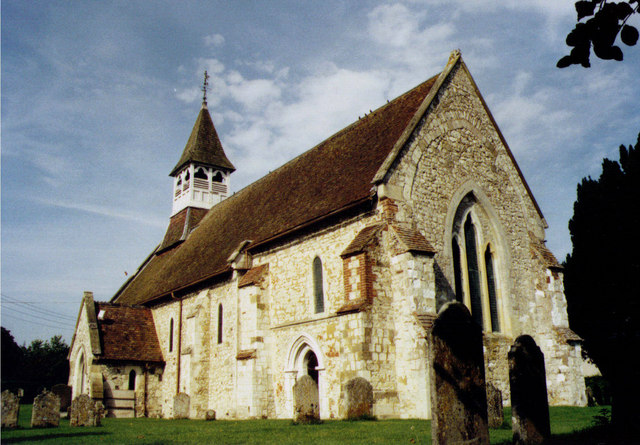
- St Mary's Church

- Location within Hampshire
- OS grid reference: SU748380
- Civil parish: Worldham
- District: East Hampshire
- Shire county: Hampshire
- Region: South East
- Country: England
- Sovereign state: United Kingdom
- Post town: Alton
- Postcode district: GU34
- Police: Hampshire and Isle of Wight
- Fire: Hampshire and Isle of Wight
- Ambulance: South Central
- UK Parliament: East Hampshire

East Worldham is a village and former civil parish, now in the parish of Worldham, in the East Hampshire district of Hampshire, England. It is 1.9 miles (3.1 km) east of Alton; and 1.9 miles (3.1 km) south-west of Wyck. Hartley Mauditt and West Worldham are nearby, which, along with East Worldham, form the parish of Worldham. The village is just east of the A31 road and contains St Mary's Church and The Three Horseshoes pub, amongst other buildings. Worldham Golf Course located just to west and Dean Farm Golf Course just to the east. For centuries the village and surrounding parish were owned by Winchester College. In 1931 the parish had a population of 208.

== History ==
Archaeological findings in the fields between West and East Worldham reveal that the area has been visited and inhabited since at least the Palaeolithic era. An Iron Age Hillfort, dated to around 100 BC, lay on the summit of King John's Hill, to the east of East Worldham. The Romans built a road from Chichester to Silchester which passed below the hill over what is now Green Street and Pookles Lane.

The village is believed to have been part of "Werildeham", mentioned in the Domesday Book. There have been multiple spellings of the name, including Werildeham; Wardham, 11th century; Wirldham, 12th century; Verildham, 13th century; Verilham and YV'erlham, 14th century; and Wardelham, 16th century.

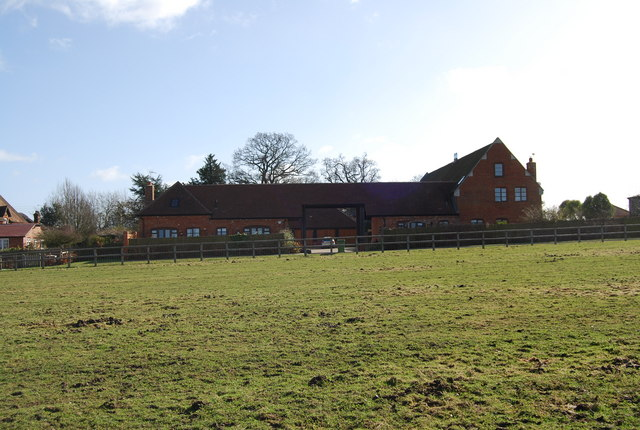
Manor Farm

For several centuries, the manor of East Worldham was held by the Venuz (or Venuiz) family, associated with marshall service, a sergeantry connected with the custody of the forests of Woolmer and Alice Holt. According to Samuel Tymms, "Robert de Venuz held the manors of East Worldham, in Hants, and Draycote, in Wilts, by the sergeantry of performing the office of Marshal. These manors, by the Domesday Survey, are said to be held by Geoffrey le Marshal. From the proximity of the period there appears little doubt but that this Geffrey left two daughters and coheiresses, married to Robert de Venuz and Gilbert le Marshal, which latter seems to have acquired the office indicated by his name, not however without a dispute from his co-inheritor, whose lands being held by virtue of serving the office, would entitle their holder to fill it." A dispute arose concerning the inheritance of the manor in the early part of the 14th century. The Patent Rolls noted that, as the result of a trial in 1329, it passed, on the death of Margery, widow of John Venuiz, to the Burghersh family. There is also a recorded release by Thomas, son and heir of John de Venuz, to Sir John de Burghersh, knight, of all his right in East Worldham manor. Thomas Chaucer married Matilda, daughter and coheiress of Sir John Burghersh, nephew of Henry Burghersh, Bishop of Lincoln, becoming the owner of the manor.

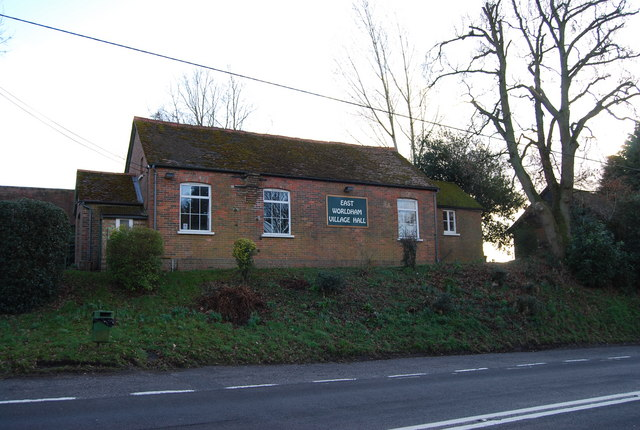
East Worldham Village Hall

Documents indicate the Gurdons or Gordons occupied the village from at least the 13th century when Sir Adam de Gurdon held property. In 1472 the Gurdon holding was purchased by Winchester College who would increasingly grow to dominate the parish over the next 500 years. The Sandals holding later merged with the Gurdons and documents exist indicating the existence of the Sandals in 1255 and another in 1329, witnessed by a John de Sandale. For centuries, village life centred on the old farm holdings of the Manor; the Shelleys, Freres, Sandals and Gurdons (now merged into Old House Farm), and the Heathers, Clays, Porters, Park, Smiths and some descendants of these families continue to live in the village today and many old farm buildings still exist. The naturalist and ornithologist Gilbert White immortalised the localities of the region, including East Worldham, in his The Natural History and Antiquities of Selborne (1789).

By at least the mid-19th century, East Worldham and most of the parish of Worldham was owned by both Winchester College and the Dutton Estate. From the early 1860s when Dr. Fell became vicar in the village, East Worldham underwent dramatic change, which the renovation of the church and additions of hop kilns to the local farms and the building of new cottages, most of which form the urban landscape of the village today. In 1892 Mr Hall of Alton, financed the "lowering of the gradients of Worldham Hill by smoothing out four sections", a steep hill which had caused many problems to the local inhabitants as it lay along the main road to the village. The first Parish Council meeting took place in 1894 in the schoolroom.

On 1 April 1932 the parish was abolished to form "Worldham".

During the Second World War, in May 1944, a Junkers Ju 188 was shot down by a Mosquito nearby and its debris was scattered across the nearby village of West Worldham, including the church wall. Later, the inhabitants had to be evacuated when a bomb fell into the field opposite Manor Farm, and had to be defused and removed by the Royal Engineers. In 1962, the Dutton Estate holdings were sold to seven tenant farmers who retained the land they farmed but sold the remaining woodlands and properties.

== Geography ==
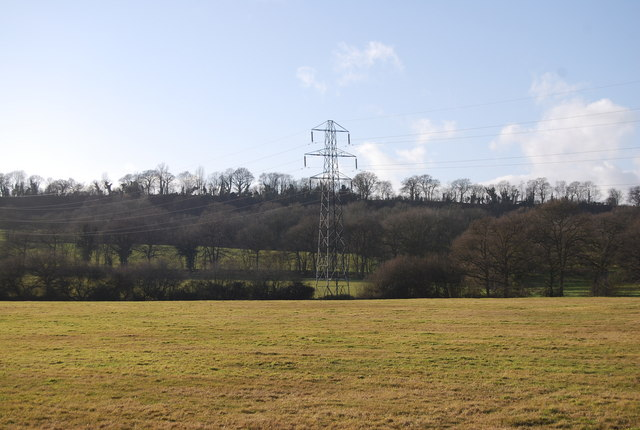
The Greensand Ridge near East Worldham

East Worldham is located in the eastern central part of Hampshire, in the south-east of England, 1.9 miles (3.1 km) south-east of Alton. It is situated at 500 feet (150 m) above sea level. The landscape is dominated by farmland and several woods such as Warner's Wood, Pheasant Wood to the south and Furzefield Copse, Rookery Copse, Great Wood, Tanner's Copse, Pondfield Copse, Monk Wood and New Copse to the north are in the vicinity as is the small hamlet of Wyck. Situated on the edge of a rock terrace, the chalk of Alton is on the west. The village slopes down abruptly to the gault adjoining Kingsley on the east. Oakhanger Stream adjoins the River Wey from East Worldham to Kingsley. Lodge Hill, or King John's Hill, is the site of a hunting lodge of John, King of England; it is situated on an isolated eminence to the south-east of the parish by Woolmer Forest. Chloritic Marl, characterised as a narrow band at the base of the Chalk Marl, is seen in the lane leading from Alton to West and East Worldham, and also north-west of Selborne. Blanket Street connects the village to West Worldham a mile to the south-west and Hartley Mauditt just beyond that. At East Worldham this road meets the B3004 road (Caker Lane/Green Street) near The Three Horseshoes and is the main road passing through the village from the A31 road, leading to the A325 road in the east. The nearest railway station is Alton, 2.1 miles (3.4 km) north-west of the village.

== Economy ==
In 2001 East Worldham contained roughly two-thirds of the population of 336 people who lived in the whole Parish of Worldham. Most houses in the area date to the pre-20th century; however in recent times numerous farm buildings have been converted to housing and for industrial purposes. According to the parish website, there are now "two significant industrial developments within the parish". The local economy is based around agriculture, particularly cattle farming. Beef cattle, sheep, grain crops, and hops are the main sources of income, Farmers from the area Worldham traded in Southampton and Alton throughout its history. Most inhabitants are either retired or commute to nearby towns to work. Golf is also important to the local economy, with Worldham Golf Course located just to west and Dean Farm Golf Course just to the east. The Jalsa Salana, an annual Islamic convention held at Oaklands Farm nearby, attracts numerous people from surrounding areas. Red Bug Productions are based in the parish cottages along the main road.

== Puddingstone in Worldham ==
Puddingstones; geologically erratic stones can be found all over East Hampshire- notably at Farringdon. One quite large on can be seen on the Northern side of Caker Lane near The Three Horseshoes pub. These stones are known to have been used as way markers and are frequently found on road sides.

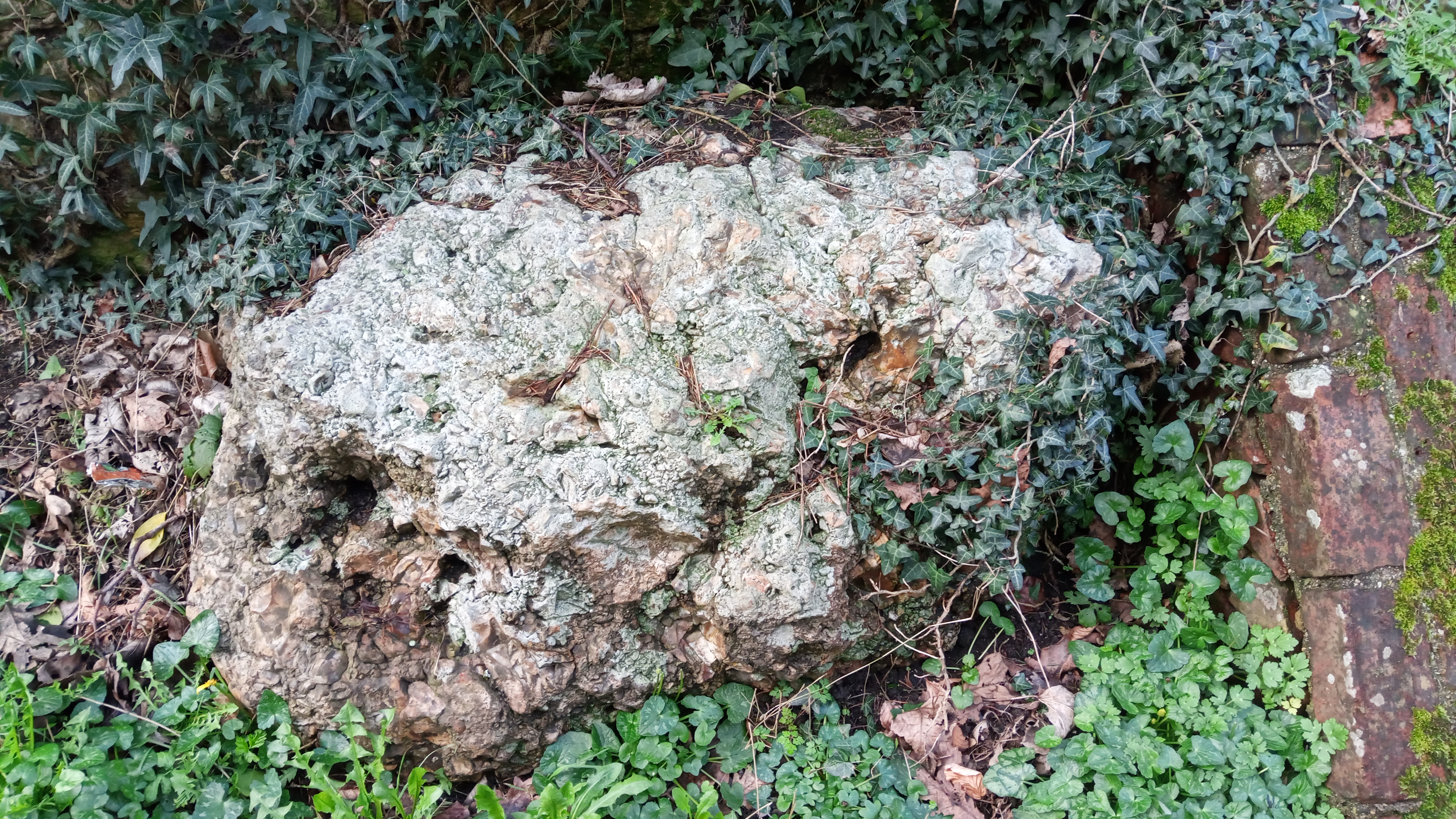
Puddingstone on Caker Lane, East Worldham, Hampshire

== Notable landmarks ==
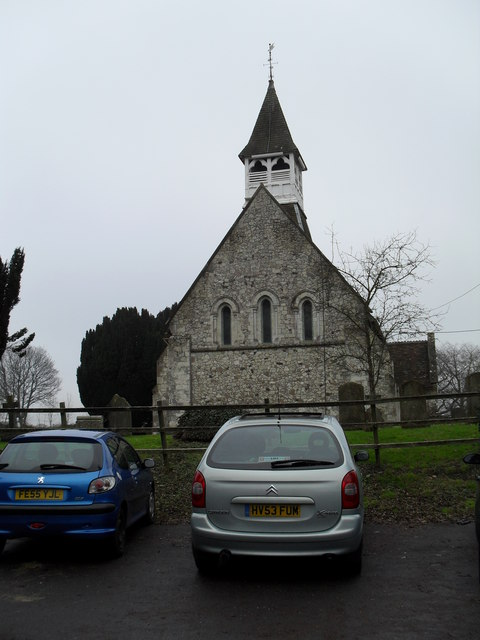
West wall of St Mary's Church

East Worldham contains 10 Grade II listed buildings. St Mary's Church is of Transitional Norman architecture and is a Grade II* listed building. Notable features include triple lancet windows, a small pointed tower, three bells, and stained glass by Hardman & Co. The chancel was restored in 1864, and in 1865, the nave was rebuilt. During the late restoration, a stone monument, like a coffin, was found under the floor of the church, which contained the figure of a 13th-century lady. Magdalen College, Oxford is patron of the vicarage. A church school was built in 1864 upon a site donated by James Dutton, 3rd Baron Sherborne.

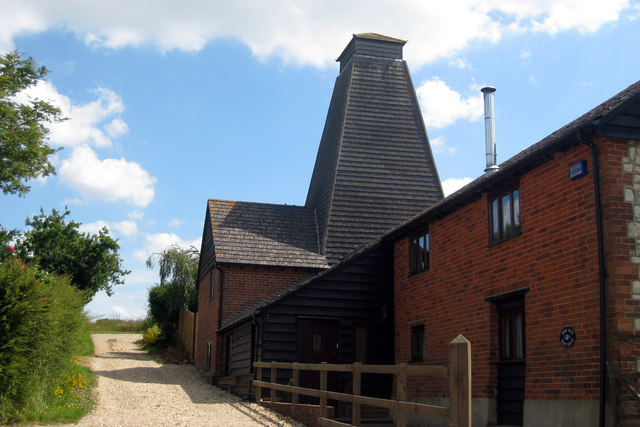
The Old Hop Kiln (Oast House)

East Worldham House, a Grade II listed building, dates to the late 18th and early 19th century. The two-storey house is made with ashlar walls, flat arches and stone cills. The entrance is located on the west side and features a Tuscan porch in the centre, with 5 windows, one of them large. The interior of the house contains Regency features, with a staircase, panelled doors in architraves, and several fireplaces. The coach house, 5 metres to the north of the house is also a listed building, dated to the early 19th century. It is made of malmstone ashlar, with the upper wall of the centre boarded with a hay loft door and has a hipped slate roof. Today this building functions as a garage and workshop.

The Old House Farmhouse on Shelleys Lane is believed by the parish authorities to have originally been the oldest building in the village, but the current building dates to only the 17th and early and late 19th century. The walls are made of coursed malmstone with brick dressings, rendered with a plinth. The roof is apparently unusual with the "northern half being of steeper pitch, both sections half-hipped, with a slate roof above the wing." It became a Grade II listed building on 1 May 1983. The Manor Farmhouse building, also a Grade II listed building, dates to the early 17th century, with alterations in the mid-19th century, containing Victorian window sashes. The Sandals farm contains three cottages dated to the 17th century. Heather Cottage is another 17th-century cottage, with 20th-century additions to the rear, on Worldham Hill, noted for its thatched roof. It is believed to be named after William Heather, a resident mentioned in the 1665 Hearth Tax returns. It became a listed building on 18 July 1986. The Three Horseshoes Public House was first licensed in 1834 and is one of the main features of the village. It was rebuilt some 50 years later by Henry Newman. Also of note is the Rectory House on Wyck Lane, and the Oast House, just to the west of the rectory.

== Notable people ==
- Alexander Charles Garrett, curate of East Worldham
- John Wallis, Arabic scholar and vicar of East Worldham
