= Colemore =

Village and parish in Hampshire, England

Coordinates: 51.071°N 0.994°W

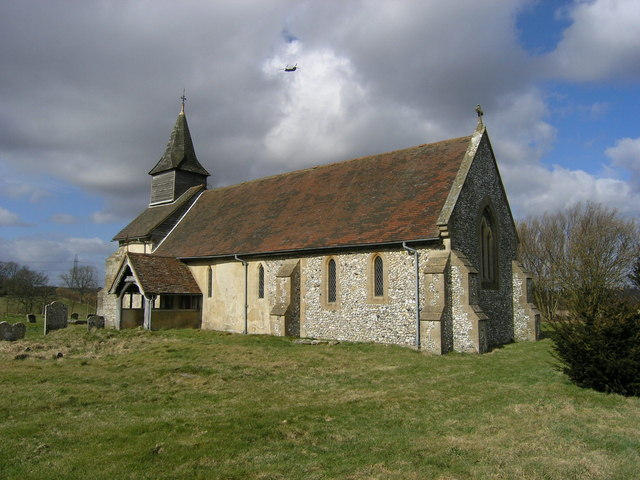
- St Peter ad Vincula parish church

- Location within Hampshire
- OS grid reference: SU705307
- Civil parish: Colemore and Priors Dean
- District: East Hampshire
- Shire county: Hampshire
- Region: South East
- Country: England
- Sovereign state: United Kingdom
- Post town: Petersfield
- Postcode district: GU32
- Police: Hampshire and Isle of Wight
- Fire: Hampshire and Isle of Wight
- Ambulance: South Central
- UK Parliament: East Hampshire

Colemore is a village and former civil parish, now in the parish of Colemore and Priors Dean, in the East Hampshire district, in the county of Hampshire, England. It is in the Hampshire Downs about 5 miles (8 km) northwest of Petersfield.

== History ==
In 1931 the parish had a population of 72. On 1 April 1932 the parish was abolished and merged with Priors Dean to form "Colemore and Priors Dean".

Colemore is a largely abandoned village. There were houses southwest of the parish church and southeast of manor farm. The land where they stood is now a Scheduled Ancient Monument.

Manor Farmhouse is an early 17th-century brick house, altered in the middle of the 19th century. There was a National School in the village in the 19th century.

== Church ==
The earliest parts of the former Church of England parish church of St Peter ad Vincula ("St Peter in Chains") are eleventh-century. It is a Grade II* listed building. It is now redundant and in the care of the Churches Conservation Trust.

== Notable people ==
The brothers John Greaves (1602–52, mathematician), Edward Greaves (1608–80, physician) and Thomas Greaves (1612–76, orientalist) were all sons of a rector of the parish and born in the village. A later orientalist, Richard Pococke (1704–65), was also the son of a rector of the parish.

== Sources and further reading ==
- Page, WH, ed. (1911). A History of the County of Hampshire. Victoria County History. Vol. 4. Westminster: Archibald Constable & Co. pp. 423–425.
- Pevsner, Nikolaus; Lloyd, David (1967). Hampshire and the Isle of Wight. The Buildings of England. Harmondsworth: Penguin Books. p. 181.
