= Worldham =

Civil parish in Hampshire, England

Coordinates: 51.125648°N 0.940847°W

East and West Worldham
- A tree and a home in Wordham, 2010

- Location within Hampshire
- Population: 354 (2011 Census including Hartley Mauditt)
- OS grid reference: SU7421736796
- District: East Hampshire
- Shire county: Hampshire
- Region: South East
- Country: England
- Sovereign state: United Kingdom
- Post town: ALTON
- Postcode district: GU34
- Dialling code: 01420
- Police: Hampshire and Isle of Wight
- Fire: Hampshire and Isle of Wight
- Ambulance: South Central
- UK Parliament: East Hampshire

Worldham is a civil parish in Hampshire, England. East Worldham is the main settlement in Worldham Parish, a civil parish with a population of approximately 310, within the East Hampshire district. It is situated about two miles south east of Alton on B3004 road. It has two neighbouring villages, East Worldham and West Worldham. It also contains the hamlet of Hartley Mauditt in its boundaries.

== See also ==
- East Worldham
- West Worldham
- Hartley Mauditt
