= Idsworth =

Village and parish in Hampshire, England

Coordinates: 50.92237°N 0.94699°W

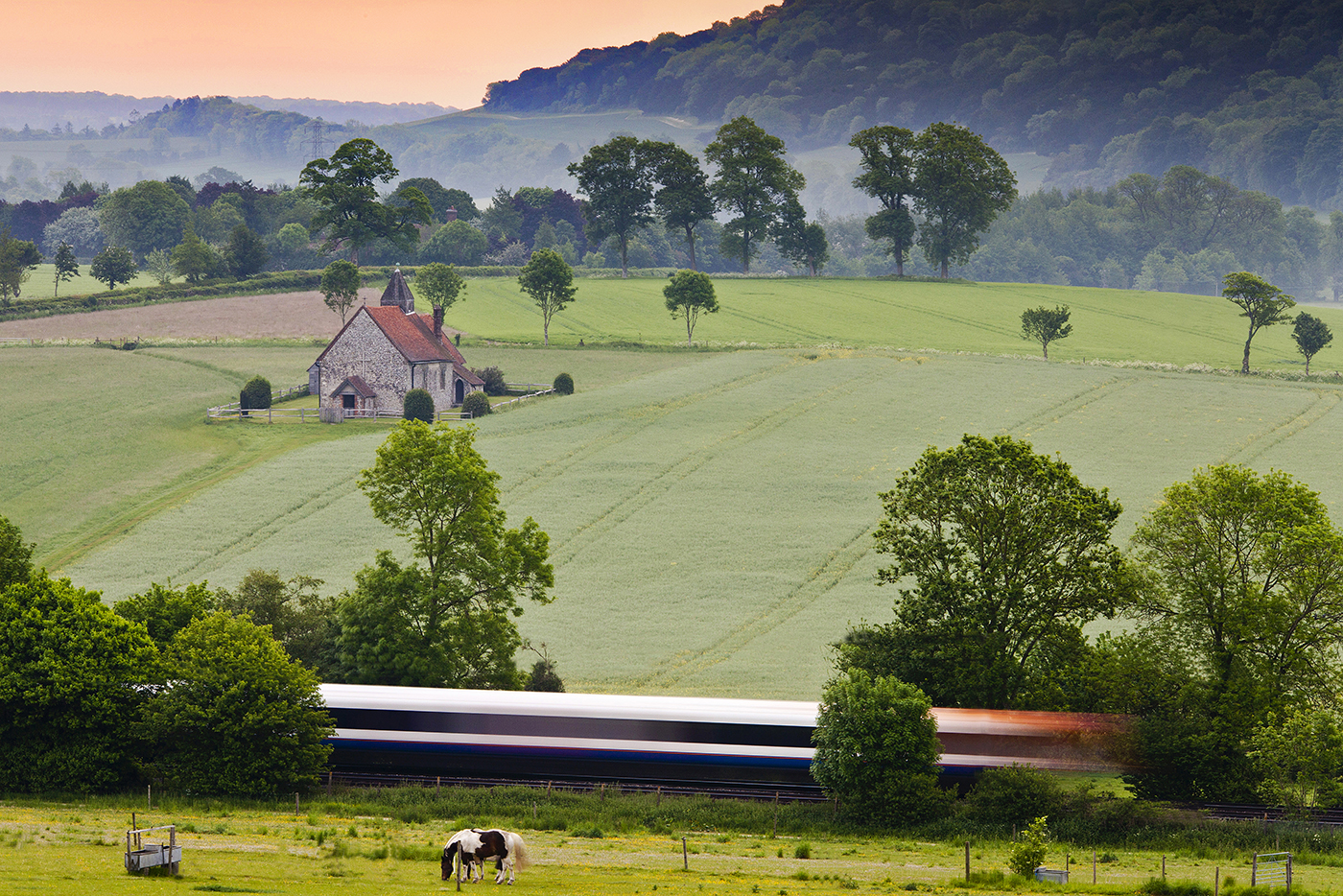
- A Train passing St Hubert's church

- Location within Hampshire
- OS grid reference: SU741142
- Civil parish: Rowlands Castle
- District: East Hampshire
- Shire county: Hampshire
- Region: South East
- Country: England
- Sovereign state: United Kingdom
- Post town: Waterlooville
- Postcode district: PO8
- Police: Hampshire and Isle of Wight
- Fire: Hampshire and Isle of Wight
- Ambulance: South Central

Idsworth is an isolated hamlet, with mediaeval Saxon origins, in the civil parish of Rowlands Castle, in the East Hampshire district and South Downs National Park in Hampshire, England. It was formerly the centre of a Norman manor.

Idsworth remains an ecclesiastical parish in the Church of England, the only place of worship of which is the tenth-century St Huberts Chapel. It has mediaeval paintings on the north wall and surrounding the altar window on the east wall. It is promoted by the Diocese as an arranged retreat, for seasonal walkers by public footpath, as "the little church in the field".

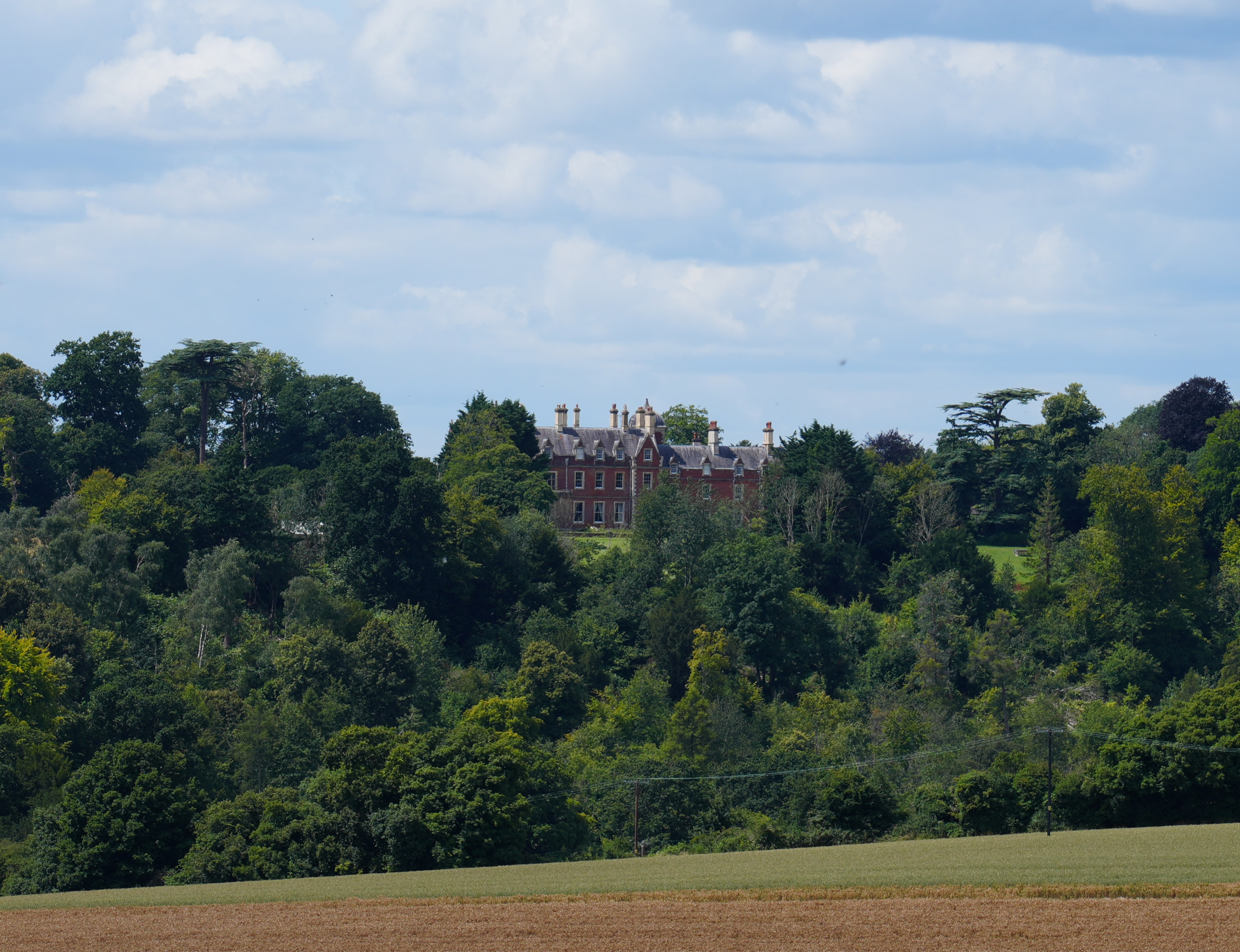
view towards Idsworth House apartments

The place occupies a cross-section of a small valley, centred 1 mile (1.5 km) north of its daughter hamlet and former main manor, much more populous than Idsworth – today considered a village – Finchdean, and 2.3 miles (3.6 km) east of Horndean. It has a long border with West Sussex border. The area is also home to Idsworth House which was built around 1850 to a design by William Burn. It was converted into apartments in 1977.

Idsworth was formerly a chapelry in the parish of Chalton, in 1866 Idsworth became a separate civil parish, on 1 April 1932 the parish was abolished to form Rowlands Castle. In 1931 the parish had a population of 538.

The nearest railway station is 2.1 miles (3.3 km) south of the village, at Rowlands Castle.
