= Blendworth =

Village in Hampshire, England

Coordinates: 50.91694°N 0.98929°W

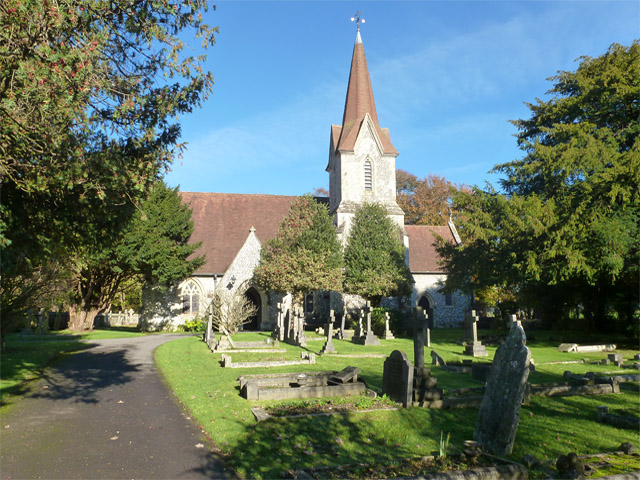

- Location within Hampshire
- Population: (2001) < 100
- OS grid reference: SU710134
- Civil parish: Horndean
- District: East Hampshire
- Shire county: Hampshire
- Region: South East
- Country: England
- Sovereign state: United Kingdom
- Post town: WATERLOOVILLE
- Postcode district: PO8
- Dialling code: 023
- Police: Hampshire and Isle of Wight
- Fire: Hampshire and Isle of Wight
- Ambulance: South Central
- UK Parliament: East Hampshire

Blendworth is a village and former civil parish, now in the parish of Horndean, in the East Hampshire district of Hampshire, England. It lies 0.4 miles (0.6 km) northeast of Horndean just east off the A3 road.

The village has a population of fewer than 100 people, in 1931 the parish had a population of 398. On 1 April 1932 the parish was abolished and merged with Horndean, Rowland's Castle and Havant. The church, Holy Trinity, was erected in 1850–51, and until recently had a C of E Infant School next to it. Blendworth also has a brass band. and had stables until 2022 when all the land belonging to Myrtle Farm - which included the stables - was sold. The nearest railway station is 2.2 miles (3.5 km) southeast of the village, at Rowlands Castle.

The village is also close to Chalton, Finchdean and Rowlands Castle.

== Blendworth Brass Band ==
The Blendworth Brass Band was founded in 1982 by Commander Chris Eason, OBE. The band are well known in surrounding areas such as Portsmouth, Southampton, Hayling Island, Denmead, Petersfield, Liss, Havant and Waterlooville. They regularly take trips within the UK and Europe to promote brass band music and further their musical ability.
