= Staunton Way =

Footpath in Hampshire, England

Coordinates: 50.810°N 1.006°W

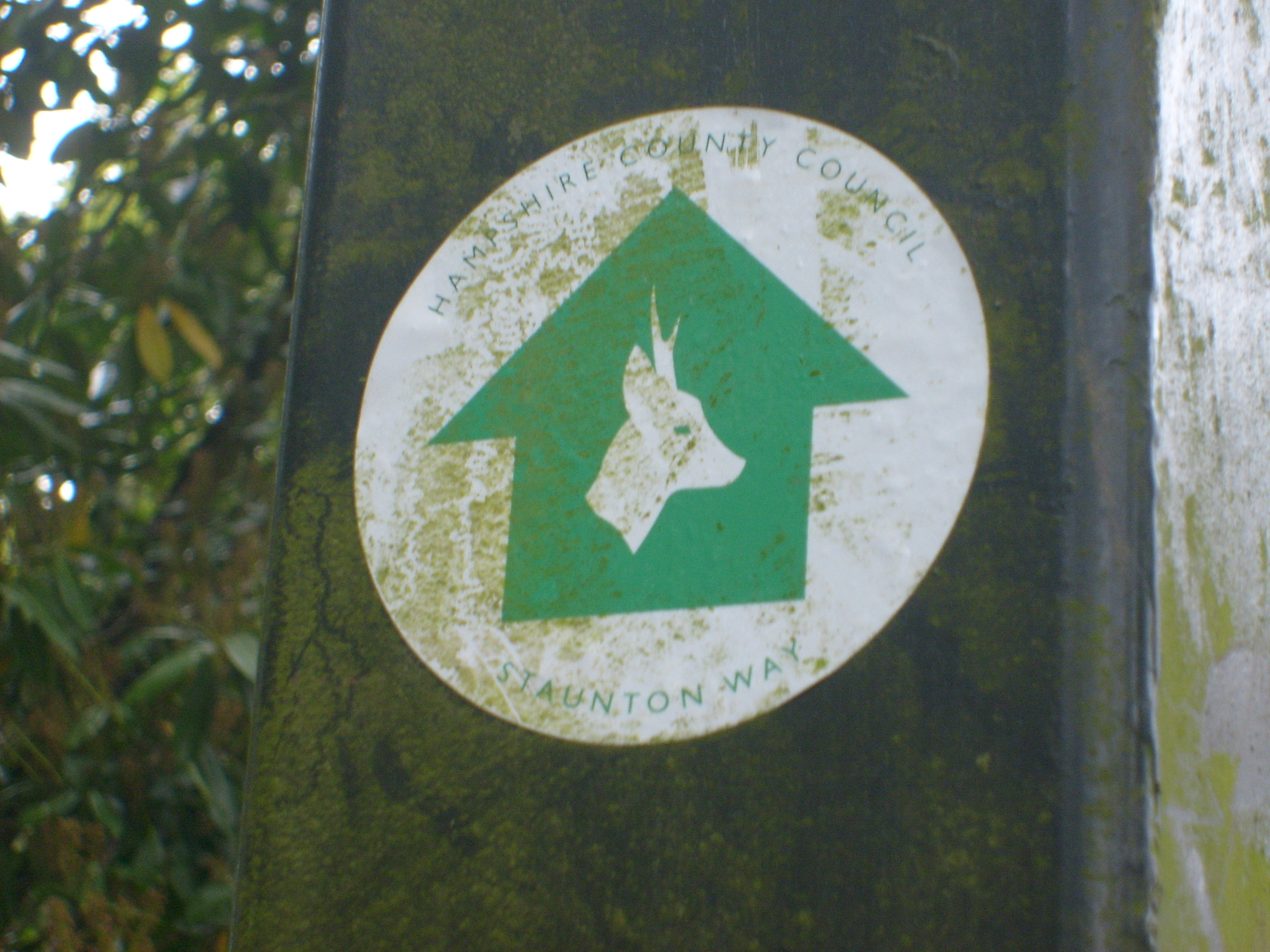
A Staunton Way waymarker.

The Staunton Way is a 20.5 mile recreational circular walk in Hampshire, southern England, that connects Queen Elizabeth Country Park to Staunton Country Park.

The route passes through the villages of Chalton, Finchdean and Rowlands Castle.

It is waymarked with the picture of a roe deer and a green arrow.

At Queen Elizabeth Country Park the walk connects to the South Downs Way and Hangers Way. At Rowland's Castle the path crosses the Monarch's Way. Sections of this walk also form part of the Sussex Border Path and Shipwrights Way. Originally a linear path extending to the coast, some sections have now been subsumed by, or shared with, the Shipwrights Way.

== See also ==
- Recreational walks in Hampshire
