= Chalton, Hampshire =

Village and parish in Hampshire, England

Coordinates: 50.93926°N 0.96027°W

Chalton
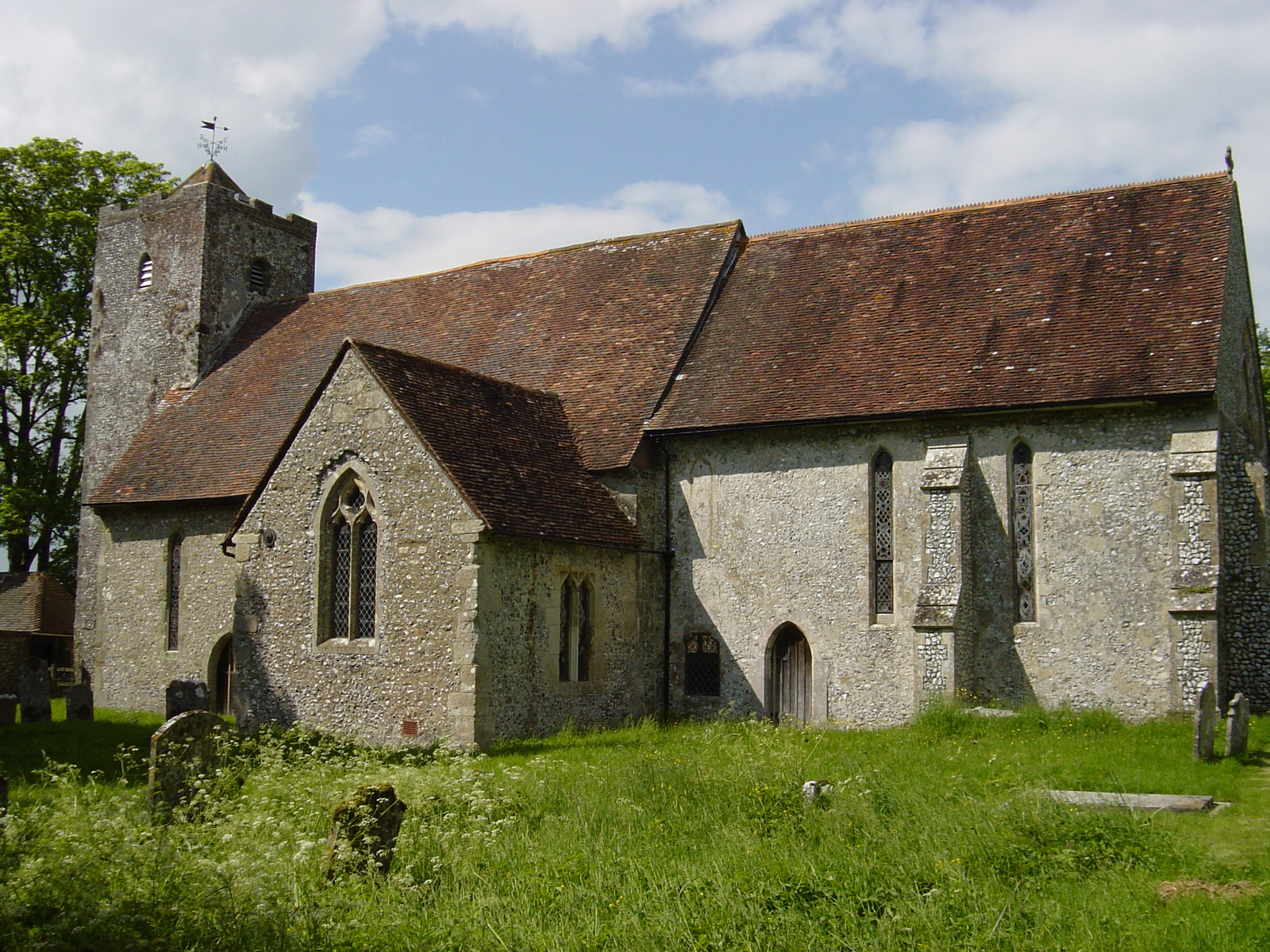
- St. Michael & All Angels

- Location within Hampshire
- OS grid reference: SU731160
- Civil parish: Clanfield
- District: East Hampshire
- Shire county: Hampshire
- Region: South East
- Country: England
- Sovereign state: United Kingdom
- Post town: WATERLOOVILLE
- Postcode district: PO8
- Dialling code: 023
- Police: Hampshire and Isle of Wight
- Fire: Hampshire and Isle of Wight
- Ambulance: South Central
- UK Parliament: East Hampshire

Chalton is a small village and former civil parish, now in the parish of Clanfield, in the East Hampshire district of Hampshire, England. It is 2.3 miles (3.7 km) north-east of Horndean and just east of the A3. The nearest railway station is 3.1 miles (5 km) south of the village, at Rowlands Castle. In 1931 the parish had a population of 158. On 1 April 1932 the parish was abolished and merged with Clanfield, part also went to form Rowlands Castle.

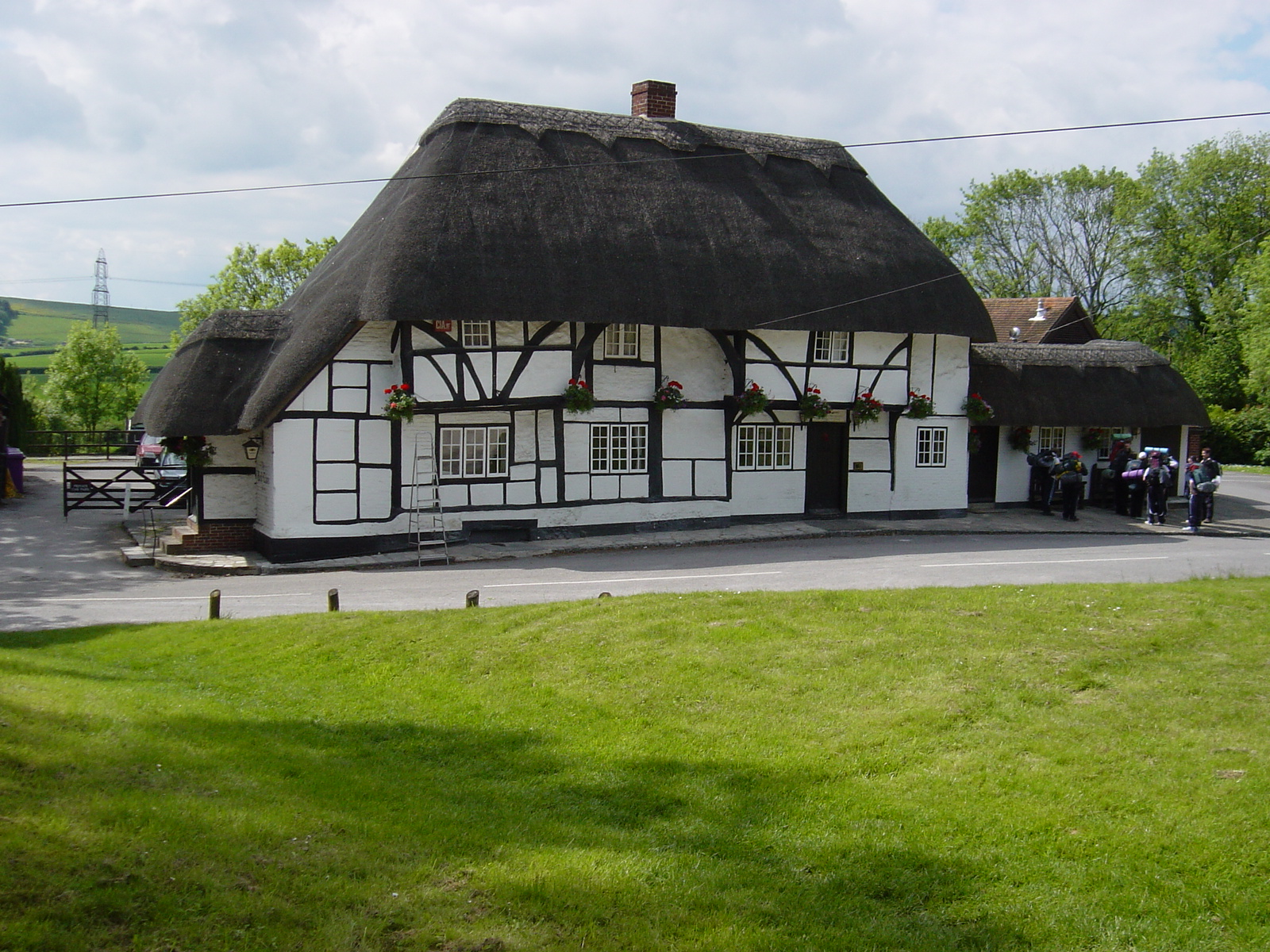
Chalton green and The Red Lion pub

== Heritage ==
The village pub, The Red Lion, is believed to be the oldest in Hampshire, dating from the 16th century, though possibly earlier. The Church of England Parish Church of St. Michael and All Angels has a thirteenth-century chancel; the registers include burials in woollen cloth from 1678 to 1746. Clanfield and Chalton parishes were amalgamated 1932. Chalton was listed as part of the 'Hundred of Finchdean' in the Domesday Book.

On Windmill Hill, Hampshire near Chalton is Chalton Windmill which stands at 193 metres above sea level. Also near Chalton, is Butser Ancient Farm and the area around Chalton is home to many ancient sites.

The Staunton Way footpath goes past Chalton from Queen Elizabeth Country Park which is close to the village.

The Admiralty Shutter Telegraph Line had a semaphore line station at Chalton.

== Notable people ==
Chalton is where the satirist James Bramston was buried in 1743. Admiral Richard Goodwin Keats, famous for his actions at the Battle of Algeciras Bay in 1801 was born in Chalton in 1757.
