= Clanfield, Hampshire =

Village and civil parish in Hampshire, England

Coordinates: 50.94700°N 1.00814°W

Clanfield
- New Clanfield

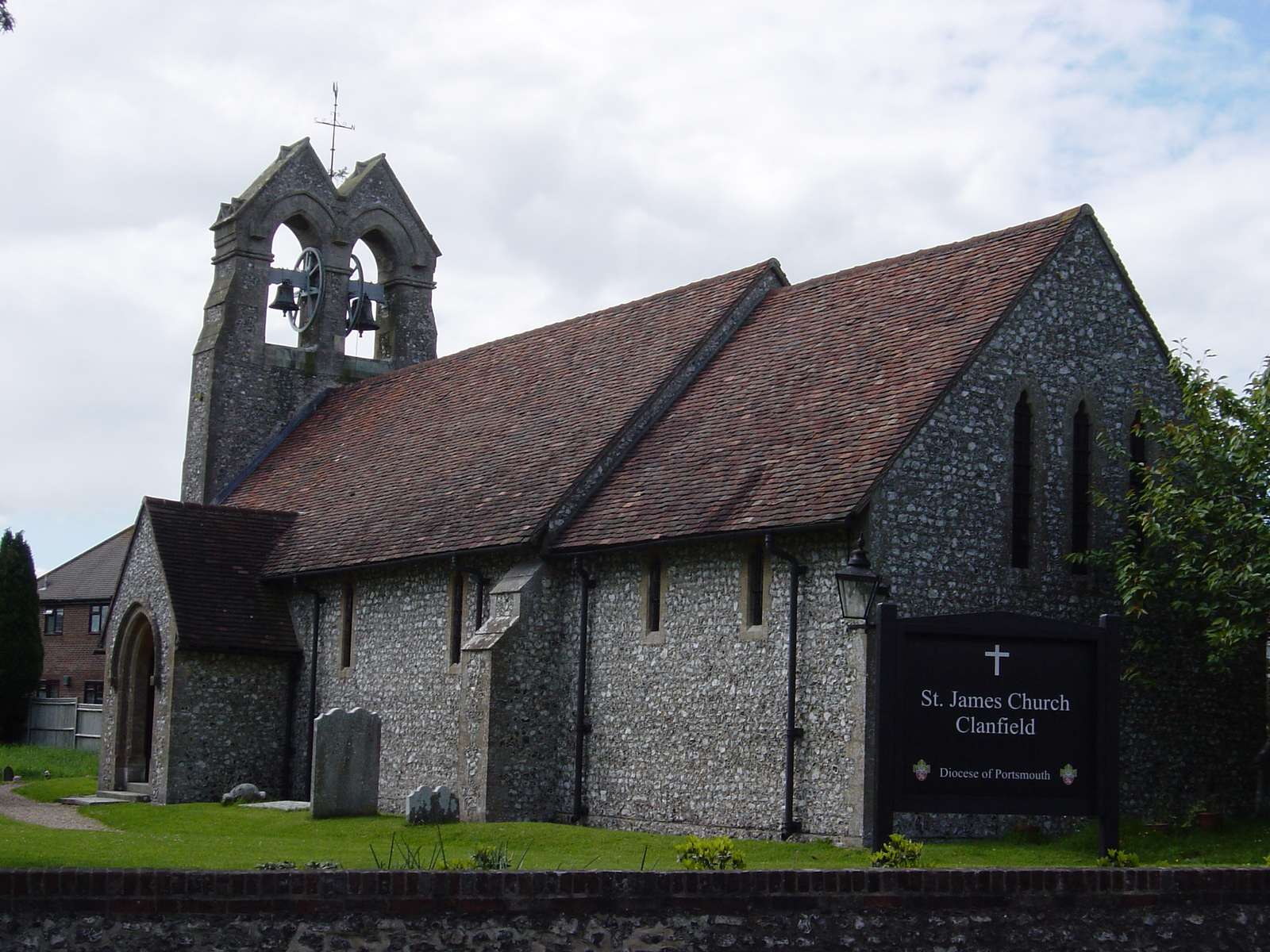
- Church of St. James

- Location within Hampshire
- Population: 6,015 (2021 Census including Chalton)
- OS grid reference: SU697168
- Civil parish: Clanfield
- District: East Hampshire
- Shire county: Hampshire
- Region: South East
- Country: England
- Sovereign state: United Kingdom
- Post town: WATERLOOVILLE
- Postcode district: PO8
- Dialling code: 023
- Police: Hampshire and Isle of Wight
- Fire: Hampshire and Isle of Wight
- Ambulance: South Central
- UK Parliament: East Hampshire

Clanfield is a village and civil parish in the south-east of the East Hampshire district of Hampshire, England. It is situated 2.4 miles (3.9 kilometres) north of Horndean, 12 mi (19 km) north of Portsmouth and 6 mi (10 km) south of Petersfield. It sits to the west of the main A3 road, just north of where the A3(M) (Motorway) ends.

The surrounding villages are Horndean, Catherington, Hinton Daubney, Chalton, East Meon, and Hambledon It has a semi-rural character, with 3 sides of the village being adjoined by fields including Queen Elizabeth Country Park. Clanfield is overlooked from the other side of the A3 road by Windmill Hill and Chalton Windmill, which stands at 193 metres above sea level. Many references in Clanfield feature the windmill, such as Windmill Garage.

The population of Clanfield was 6,015 in 2021, a 30% increase from the 2011 census owing to property development and new homes. Clanfield is a popular area for walkers, with Queen Elizabeth Country Park being next to the village. The old village also has a restored pond, a thatched village well, the Clanfield memorial hall, and the church of St. James.

Clanfield consists of two parts, "Old" Clanfield and "New" Clanfield. Old Clanfield has been around for roughly 250 years and New Clanfield about 60 years.

There are two schools. Petersgate Infant in New Clanfield and Clanfield Junior School in Old Clanfield.

Clanfield is twinned with Val d'Oison, France

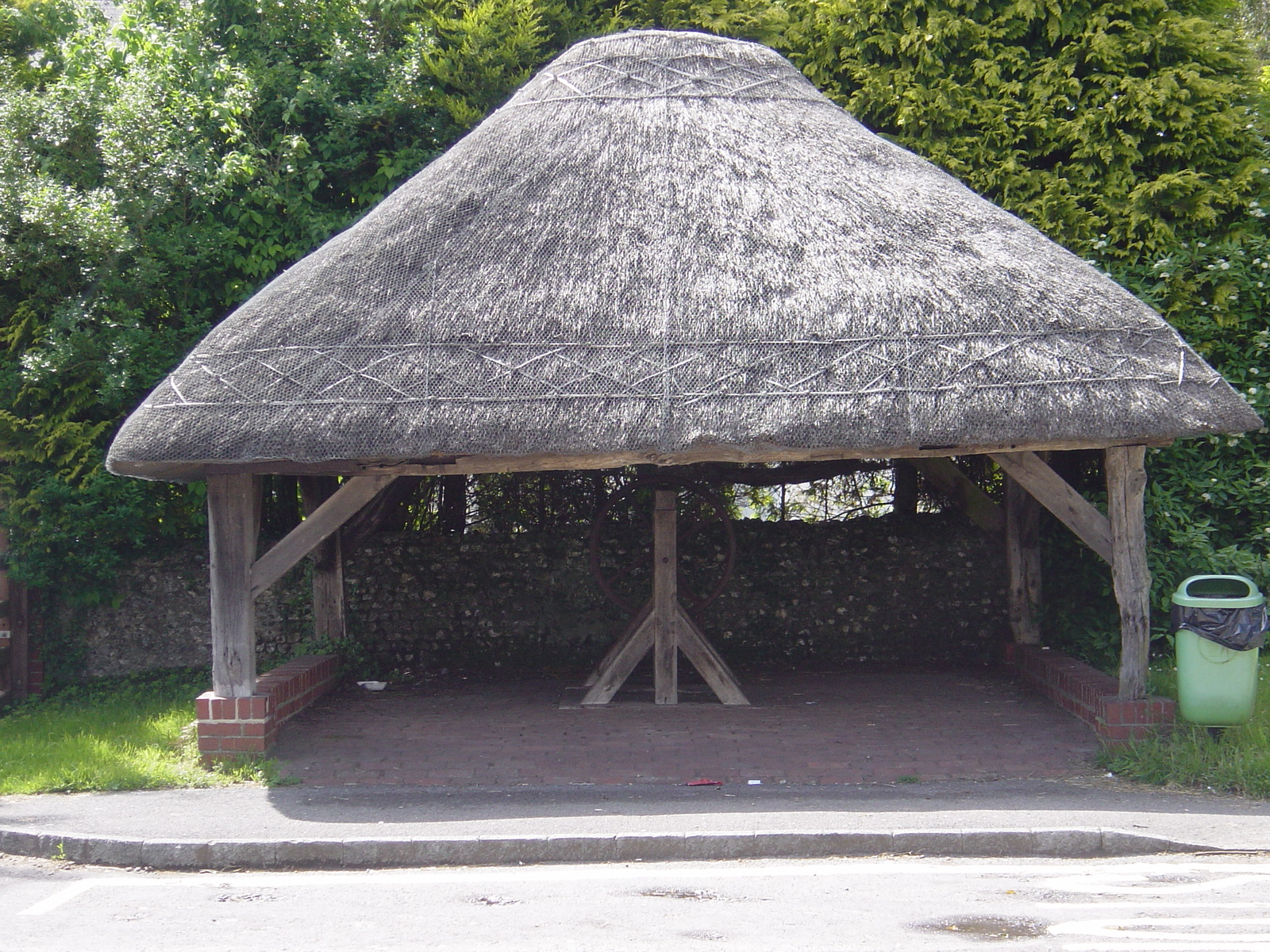
Clanfield Well and Thatched Cover

Clanfield Pond

The Clanfield Centre

New Clanfield Village Centre

== History ==
The name Clanfield is derived from the Old English and means "cleared field". Clanfield was historically a small farming community centred about the church of St James, that dates from 1305 and was rebuilt in 1875 and contains two ancient medieval bells. The community in 1929 recorded the population as 129, by the late 1940s almost 500, and in 1998 over 4500, with almost 1700 households.

The South Downs National Park borders Clanfield on three sides (east, north and west) and includes a large part of the undeveloped part of the village to the north (the former Area of Outstanding Natural Beauty).

== Politics ==
Clanfield has a parish council, two councillors for the Clanfield and Finchdean ward of East Hampshire District Council, and one councillor for the Petersfield Butser electoral division of Hampshire County Council.

Clanfield is in the East Hampshire constituency for elections to the House of Commons but was previously in the Meon Valley constituency before its abolition in 2024. Prior to Brexit in 2020, it was in the South East England constituency for elections to the European Parliament. Voting takes place in the Memorial Hall or Sports Centre. Since 2010 the Conservatives have won every election in the Meon Valley constituency.

== Public transport ==
There are two main bus routes in Clanfield. The number 8 goes between New Clanfield and Portsmouth via Waterlooville, and the number 37 goes between Petersfield and Havant via Clanfield and Waterlooville.

The nearest railway stations are at Rowlands Castle and Petersfield.

== Community and sport ==
There are three parks in Clanfield. All have swings and other child play items and Peel Park has a skateboard park. There is a park near the Sports centre in the new housing estate. South Lane Meadow has a cricket ground, and Peel Park has football pitches. Peel park has a building with changing rooms in. Clanfield has a football club called Clanfield F.C. The club contains teams for children, which are split into year groups.

Clanfield's major community centres are Clanfield Memorial Hall, in South Lane, Clanfield Sports and Community Centre, Endal way, the St James Church Hall and Leader Hall (for the Scouts), both Little Hyden Lane. The sports centre opened in 2019.

There are three public houses and one wine bar. The rebuilt Rising Sun in the old village, the Hampshire Hog (previously Hogs Lodge) on the outskirts of the parish near the A3 and the famous Bat and Ball Inn, in Hyden Farm Lane, opposite the "Cradle of Cricket", Broadhalfpenny Down cricket ground. The boundary between Clanfield and Hambledon used to run through the Bat & Ball and the brass strip marking the old boundary still runs across the floor. Both the original Hogs Lodge (which was originally further behind the present one) and the Bat And Ball were occupied by members of the Murrant family. Originally a nineteenth-century building, in 1969 the Rising Sun achieved fame as the pub that was built in one day.

There is a not-for-profit website funded by local business intended to benefit the community.

Also in Clanfield is the Clanfield Observatory run by the Hampshire Astronomical Group, who have open days. The observatory is next to one of Portsmouth Water's reservoirs.
