= Oison (river) =

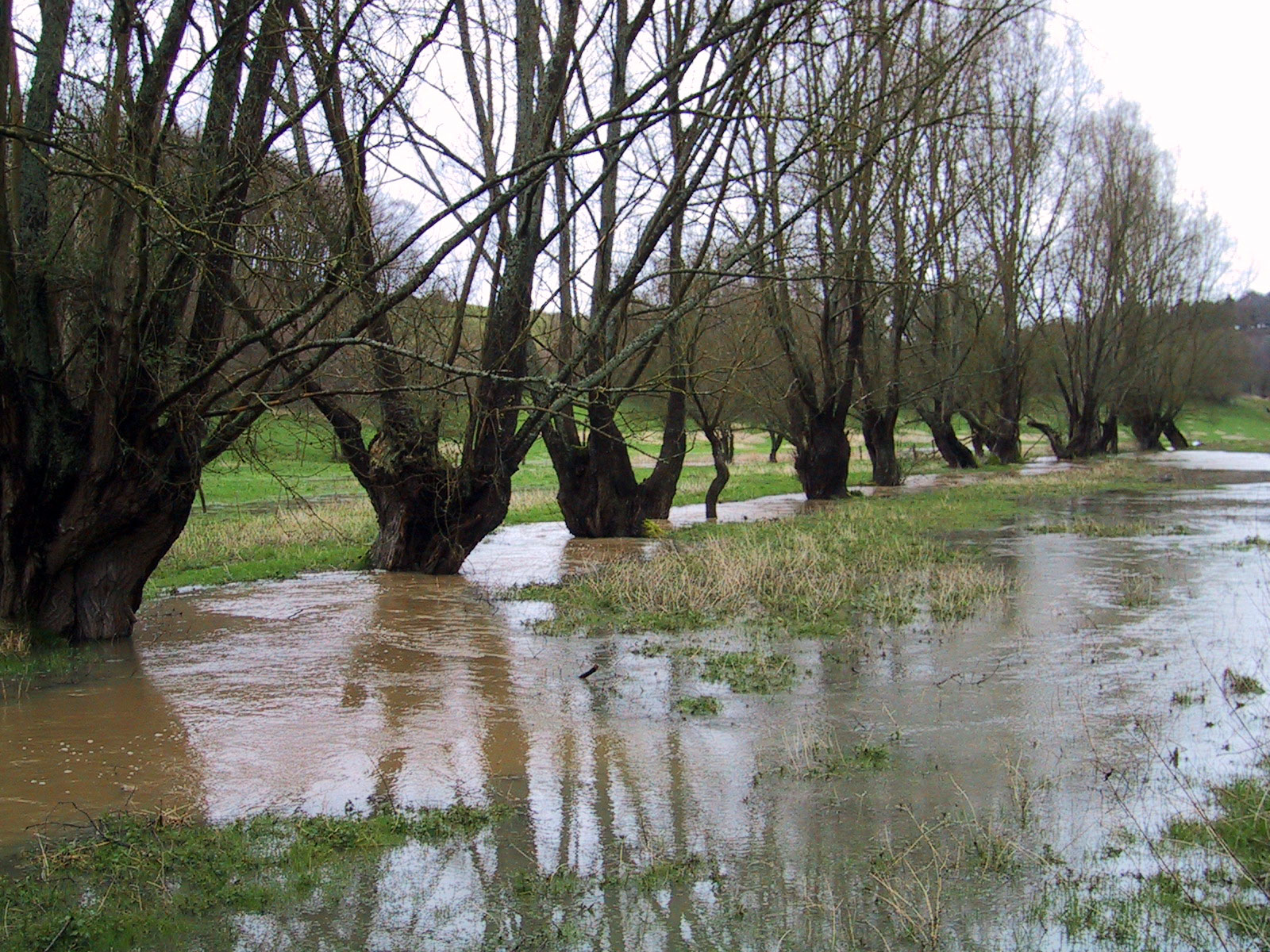

- Location within France Location within Normandy

Location
- Country: France

Physical characteristics
- Mouth: Seine
  - coordinates: 49.2946°N 1.0352°E

Basin features
- Progression: Seine→ English Channel

The Oison is a small river in the Eure department, Normandy, France. It is a left tributary of the Seine. Its source is in the commune of Saint-Amand-des-Hautes-Terres, and it flows into the Seine near Saint-Pierre-lès-Elbeuf. Its total length is 16 km (10 mi).

== Val d'Oison ==
Eight villages in the valley of the Oison (Val d'Oison) are twinned with the civil parish of Clanfield, United Kingdom.
