= Weston, East Hampshire =

Hamlet in Hampshire, England

Coordinates: 50.99198°N 0.96251°W

Weston
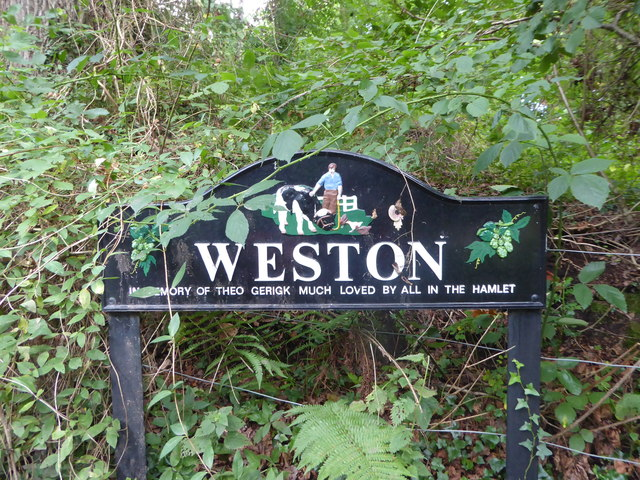
- Weston hamlet sign

- Location within Hampshire
- OS grid reference: SU729219
- Civil parish: Buriton
- District: East Hampshire
- Shire county: Hampshire
- Region: South East
- Country: England
- Sovereign state: United Kingdom
- Post town: Petersfield
- Postcode district: GU32
- Police: Hampshire and Isle of Wight
- Fire: Hampshire and Isle of Wight
- Ambulance: South Central

Weston is a hamlet in the East Hampshire district of Hampshire, England. It is in the civil parish of Buriton. It is 1.4 miles (2.3 km) southwest of Petersfield.

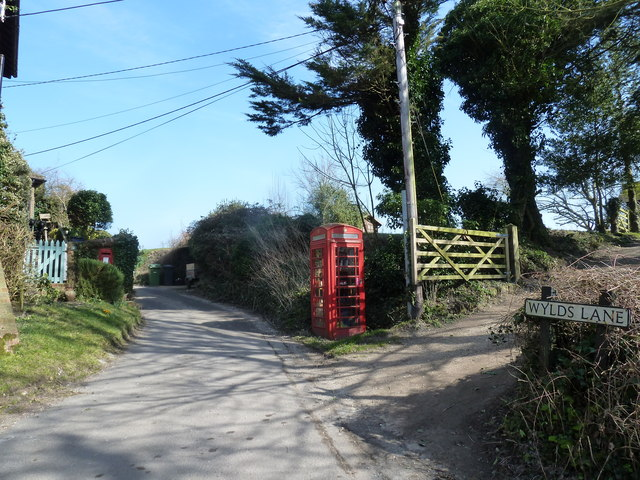
Weston

The nearest railway station is Petersfield, 1.4 miles (2.3 km) northeast of the village.

== Notes ==
Media related to Weston, East Hampshire at Wikimedia Commons
