= Finchdean =

Hamlet in Hampshire, England

Coordinates: 50.90874°N 0.95185°W

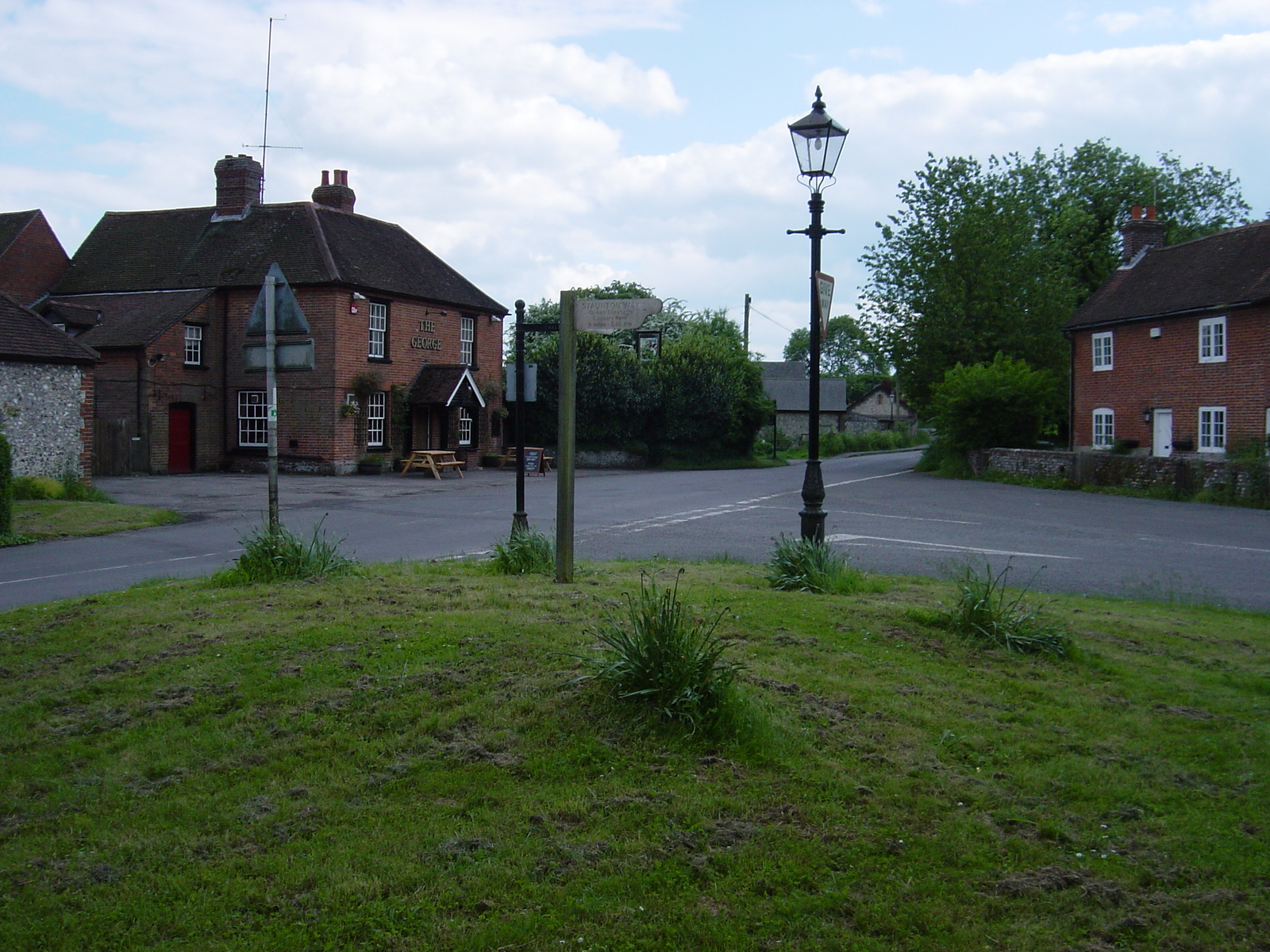

- Location within Hampshire
- OS grid reference: SU737126
- Civil parish: Rowlands Castle
- District: East Hampshire
- Shire county: Hampshire
- Region: South East
- Country: England
- Sovereign state: United Kingdom
- Post town: WATERLOOVILLE
- Postcode district: PO8
- Dialling code: 023
- Police: Hampshire and Isle of Wight
- Fire: Hampshire and Isle of Wight
- Ambulance: South Central
- UK Parliament: East Hampshire

Finchdean is a rural hamlet in the East Hampshire district of Hampshire, England. It lies on the Hampshire/West Sussex border, 1.7 miles (2.7 km) east of Horndean.

The origin of the place-name is from the Old English word finc and denu meaning valley of the finch (or of a man called Finc); the place-name appears as Finchesdene in 1167. The hamlet has a United Reformed Church in a building that was previously a stable before being converted to a chapel in 1830. The hamlet also has a pub/restaurant "The George".

The nearest railway station is 1.1 miles (1.8 km) south of the hamlet, at Rowland's Castle (where according to the Post Office the 2011 Census population was included).

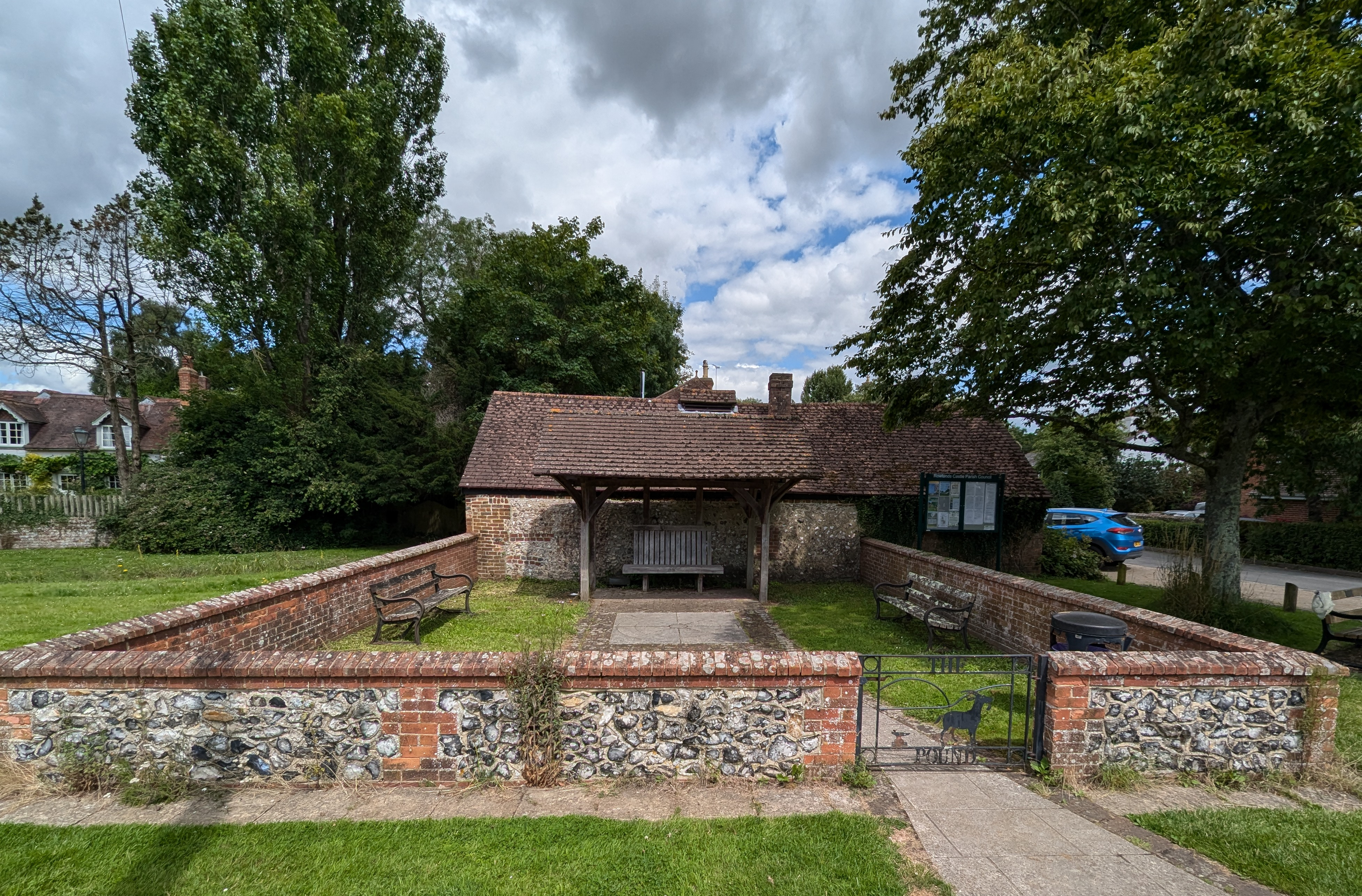
The animal pound at Finchdean

Finchdean has retained its village pound, now repurposed with seating.
