= Shipwrights Way =

Long-distance path in Hampshire, England

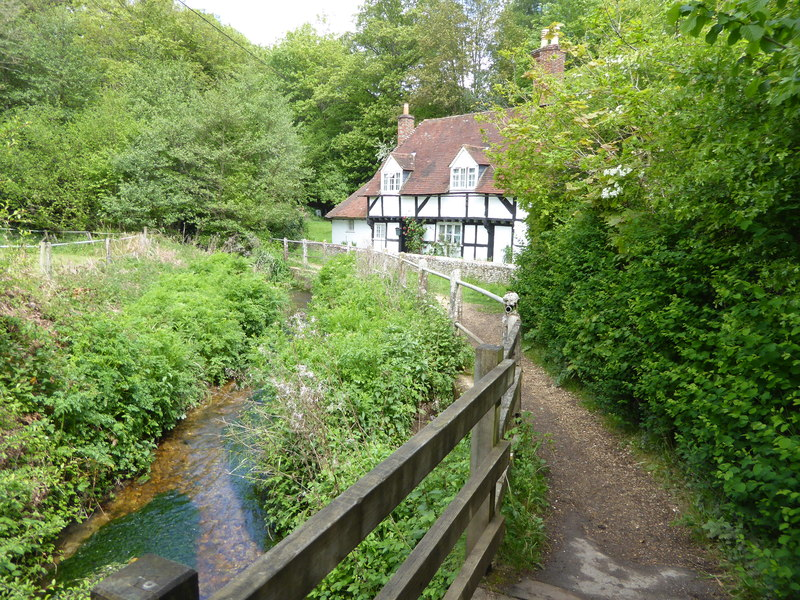
At Steep, Hampshire

Shipwrights Way, so called because it traces in a fanciful way the route that might have been taken by timber from forest to warship, is a 50-mile long-distance footpath through Hampshire, England from Alice Holt Forest to Portsmouth: it passes through Bordon, Liphook, Liss, Petersfield, Queen Elizabeth Country Park, Staunton Country Park, Havant and Hayling Island en route.
