= Rowland's Castle =

Village and parish in Hampshire, England

Coordinates: 50.89115°N 0.96006°W

Rowlands Castle
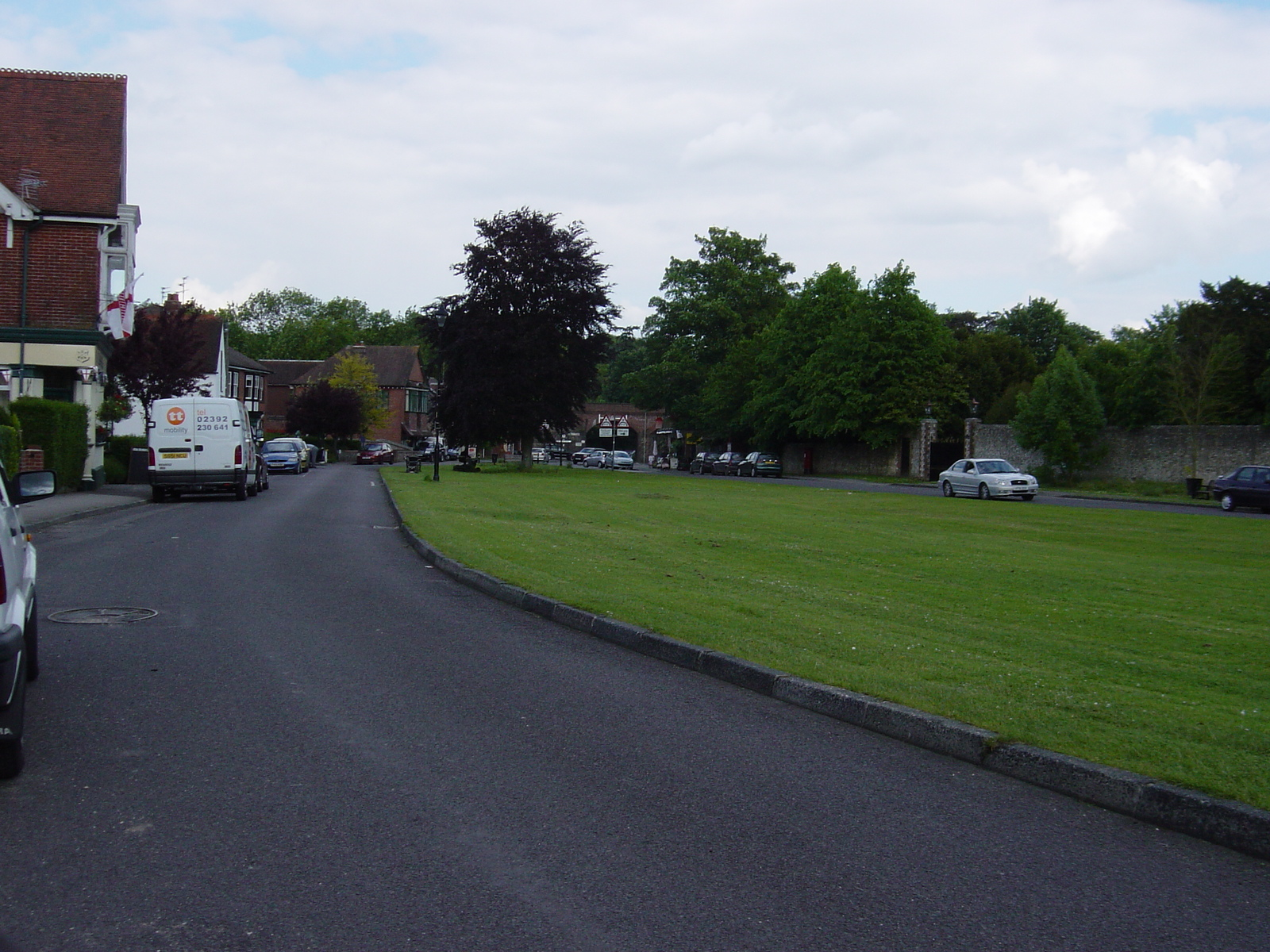
- Rowlands Castle Green

- Location within Hampshire
- Population: 2,770; 2,747 (2011 Census including Idsworth)
- OS grid reference: SU733106
- Civil parish: Rowlands Castle
- District: East Hampshire
- Shire county: Hampshire
- Region: South East
- Country: England
- Sovereign state: United Kingdom
- Post town: ROWLANDS CASTLE
- Postcode district: PO9
- Dialling code: 023
- Police: Hampshire and Isle of Wight
- Fire: Hampshire and Isle of Wight
- Ambulance: South Central
- UK Parliament: East Hampshire

Rowlands Castle is a village and civil parish in the East Hampshire district of Hampshire, England. It is 2.9 miles (4.7 km) north of Havant, on the Hampshire/West Sussex border.

The focal point of the village is the village green which is shaped somewhat like a lung. Surrounded by roads it is about 250 yards (230 m) long and about 40 yards (37 m) wide at its eastern end while tapering to almost a point at the western end near the railway arch.

The village takes its name from a motte-and-bailey castle, the remains of which are situated to the south of Redhill Road and west of the railway line, east of the current centre of the village.

== History ==
Evidence the Romans made pottery, brick and tiles in the Rowland's Castle vicinity has been uncovered, and this would have been aided due to the availability of suitable clay. The castle was built at some time between 1066 and 1189 and is first documented under the name ROLOKECASTEL in 1381.

It was in good repair in the twelfth century, when Henry II spent several days there in hunting and amusement, but was abandoned by the 15th century. The site was damaged by the railway and quarrying in the 19th century, and now only the earthworks and a few small areas of wall remain.

=== Rowlands Castle and World War 2 ===
Rowlands Castle has a recognisable history of involvement in World War 2. It was key because its geographical location meant it was close to embarkation points for cross channel crossing to France.

The presence of troops in the village during the war consequently meant King George VI visited Rowlands Castle on 22nd May 1944. This was part of his major tour-de-force inspection in nearby Portsmouth. Subsequently, a memorial stone can be found on Manor Lodge Road named ‘The Kings Stone’. It was put up in 1946 to recognise George VI’s review & salute of troops shortly before the invasion of Europe.

Adjacent to the village is Stansted Forest, which during the Second World War served as one of the camps in marshalling Area ‘A’. It was used by Allied forces before D-Day as the trees in the woods would allow them to conceal themselves from enemy aircraft that might fly over the village.

== Governance ==
Rowlands Castle is a ward and a parish council area within the East Hampshire local government district. It is also part of the East Hampshire UK Parliament constituency.

== Geography ==
The village lies in the area of the former Forest of Bere on the eastern boundary of Hampshire. To the east in the parish of Stoughton is Stansted Park.

Rowlands Castle lies on the northern edge of the Neogene deposits of the Hampshire Basin. The north of the village lies on the chalk of the southern South Downs. In the south is the Reading Formation which gave rise to the former local brick industry.

Neighbouring the village is Staunton Country Park, a regency landscaped parkland. The estate sits on the border of Havant and Rowlands castle. The Staunton Way path links the village and the country park via a short walk.

== Facilities ==
It is largely a quiet residential village, with two pubs and a few small shops, including a hardware store and a local convenience store.

A model railway depicting the village during the war has been created and is on display at nearby Stansted House.

== Transport ==
Rowlands Castle is served by Rowlands Castle railway station on the Portsmouth Direct line between London Waterloo and Portsmouth served by the generally hourly South Western Railway stopping service. There is just one significant Stagecoach bus route which operates 4 times per day during core daytime and goes via Leigh Park, Havant and Denvilles to Emsworth.

The village is crossed by several long-distance footpaths: the Monarch's Way, Sussex Border Path, Staunton Way and Shipwrights Way. National Cycle Route 22 passes by the village green on its route from Havant to Petersfield.

== Religious sites ==
=== St John the Baptist ===
The Church of England parish church of St John the Baptist is situated to the west of the centre of the village close to the B2149 road. It is an aisled church with transept and chapels with the east window being a stained-glass depiction of the Crucifixion by Francis Austin. The Church of St John the Baptist was developed between 1837 - 1838. The foundation stone was laid in the August of 1837 by Harriet Dixon, wife of nearby Stansted house’s owner. The Church was then consecrated the following July in 1838.

St John’s offers a Church Centre adjacent to the parish. It consists of a large hall and fitted with modern kitchen facilities.

=== Church on the Green ===
The Church on the Green United Reformed Church is prominent at the west end of the green.The Church was developed in 1881 at a cost of £1,000. This development was a reaction to the rapid growth of the village population that had caused the original chapel, the Providence Chapel built in 1798, to become too small.

Today, the Church offers Sunday Worship at 10:15am as well as services such as Coffee and Chat on Tuesdays between 10 - 11:30am.

=== St. Hubert's chapel ===
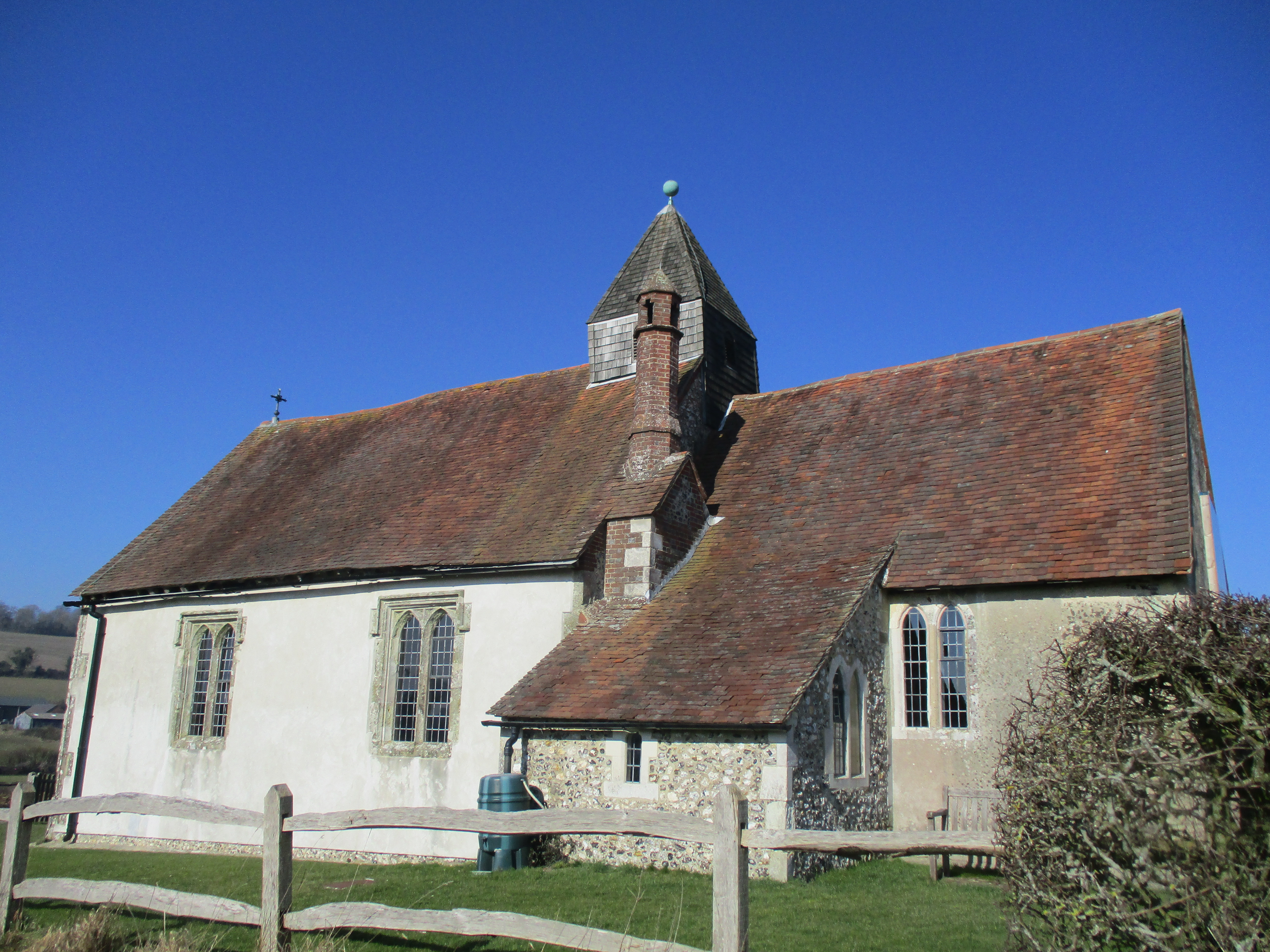
St Hubert's Chapel

St Hubert's chapel or church is in the far north of the civil parish, Idsworth. It was built in 1053 and was originally dedicated to St. Peter and St. Paul. It is a Grade I listed building, listed on 16 March 1954. The chapel contains examples of medieval paintings from around 1300 which include paintings around the altar window of St Peter, St Paul, and two angels. On the north wall there is a painting of St. Hubert and St John the Baptist. The narthex contains an octagonal stone font and above it is a gallery which contains the church organ.

Idsworth, based on its compact late Saxon church, was a chapelry long including Rowlands Castle and until a recent date unknown was dependent on the mother church of Chalton. Hence a dispute concerning the right to appoint the chaplain arose in 1275 between Henry de Bonynges, lord of the manor of Idsworth, who claimed it as an appurtenance, versus the prioress of Nuneaton, who made good (made out better) her right as patron of Chalton church, and therefore of the appendant chapel. The rectors of Chalton were bound from very early times to find a chaplain at the chapel to say mass on Sundays, Wednesdays, and Fridays, and on double feasts throughout the year, and to administer the sacraments and other rites (except the burial of the dead) for the inhabitants of the hamlets of Idsworth "and Dene" (Horndean, or perhaps Finchdean).

Sir William Haughe, rector of Chalton, discontinued this practice in 1394 and so proceedings were taken against him in the Court of Arches by Richard Romyn, lord of Idsworth manor, and the rest of the inhabitants of the two villages before Thomas Stowe and Adam Uske, who decided that the rector was liable by custom to find a chaplain to minister in Idsworth Chapel. This "sentence" (ruling) was published by the bishop of Winchester on 1 May 1398, and confirmed by the prior and chapter of Winchester on 3 June.

To mark the year 2000 a new fresco was added to the church’s nave.

The Black Death hit the parish in 1348 after three years of reduced crops. The resulting death toll causing the adjacent village of Hartley Mauditt to be abandoned.

== Sport and leisure ==
The village has an 18-hole golf course; the club being formed in 1902 with a 9-hole course.

In 1994 Stage 5 of the Tour de France passed through Rowland's Castle, attracting large crowds with its carnival atmosphere.

There is a recreation ground with a children’s play area and a selection of activities. These include football pitches, tennis courts and a cricket pitch. It also offers a pavilion and outdoor gym equipment. As of 2023, the recreation ground re-opened after a £100,000 extended play park was implemented; offering a range of equipment for different ages and abilities.

== Notable people ==
Former Van Morrison guitarist and Britain's Got Talent contestant Herbie Armstrong once ran The Fountain Inn in the centre of the village next to the village green. His weekly live music evenings attracted music lovers from across the region, and have been known to include some famous faces; Mick Hucknall on one occasion.

Former British No. 1 tennis player Chris Wilkinson remains active at the local, county and national levels.

Reverend George Heathcote Austen, nephew of author Jane Austen and son of Admiral Sir Francis Austen, once took up residence in Rowlands Castle at Oaklands House until 1895. During this time, he had the responsibility of rector at Saint John’s Church for 41 years. He is now buried in this church, where his grave can still be seen today, alongside his wife Louisa Tragett and two of his five children.

== Community ==
Rowlands Castle has an annual fair. This event is on the first Saturday of July and held centrally on the village green. Highlights often include food stalls, dog and horticultural shows, as well as live music and fairground rides throughout the day.

There is a yearly village scarecrow trail in Rowlands Castle. It is an opportunity for families, businesses or communities organise scarecrows to raise funds for the local primary school. Starting in October annually, designs are based on a theme; these have included ‘What i want to be when i grow up’ and ‘Myths, Fairytales and Legends’.

== Education ==
There is a local school, the Rowlands Castle St John’s Church of England Controlled Primary School. The school can be found along Whichers Gate Road.

The Original and first St John’s school could be found to the left of Redhill Road, it was also known as Redhill school. It was built in 1848 but over time became overcrowded. It was replaced by the current Rowlands Castle CofE Primary School on a different site in 1974.

== Gallery ==
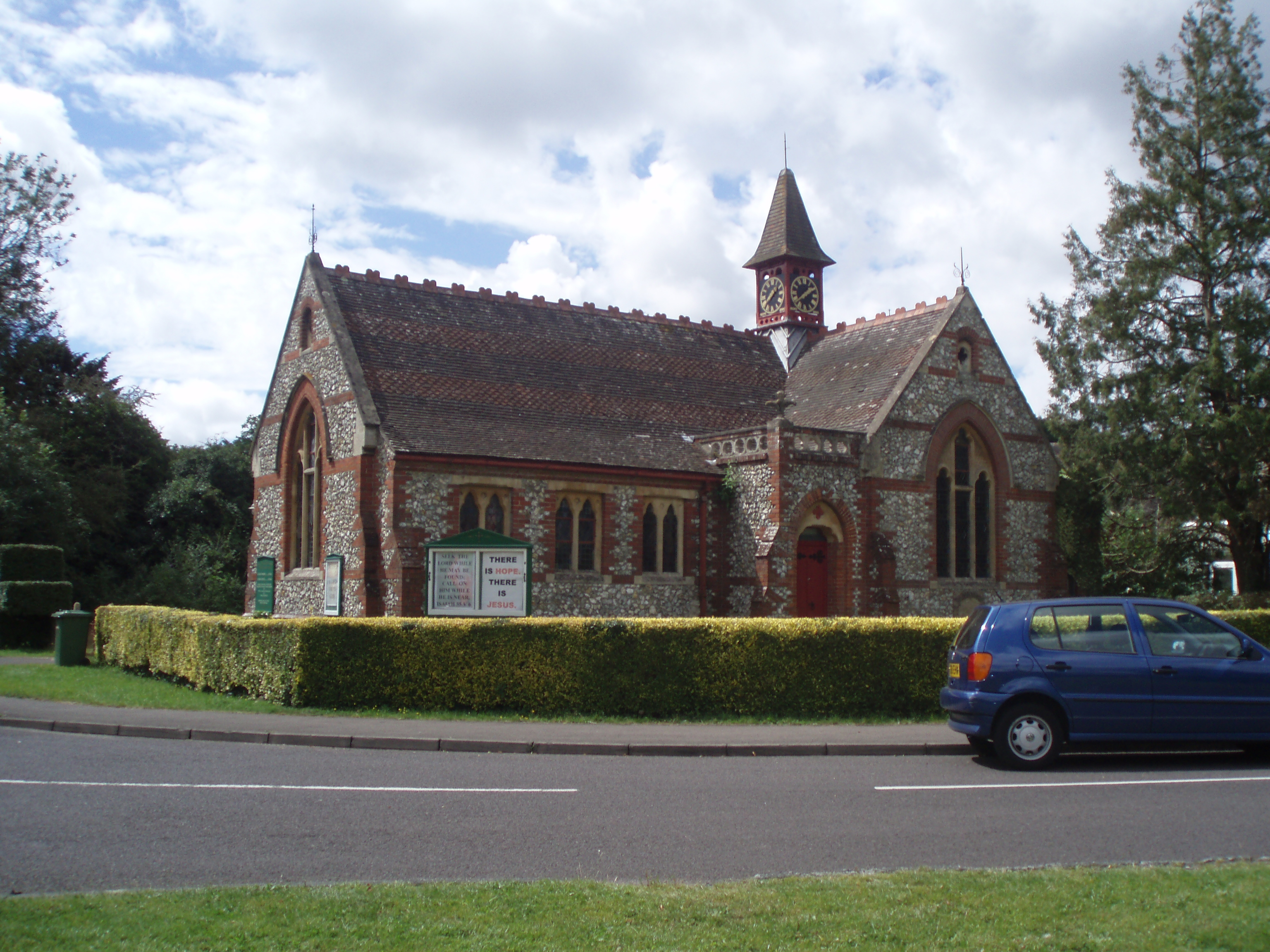
The Church on the Green

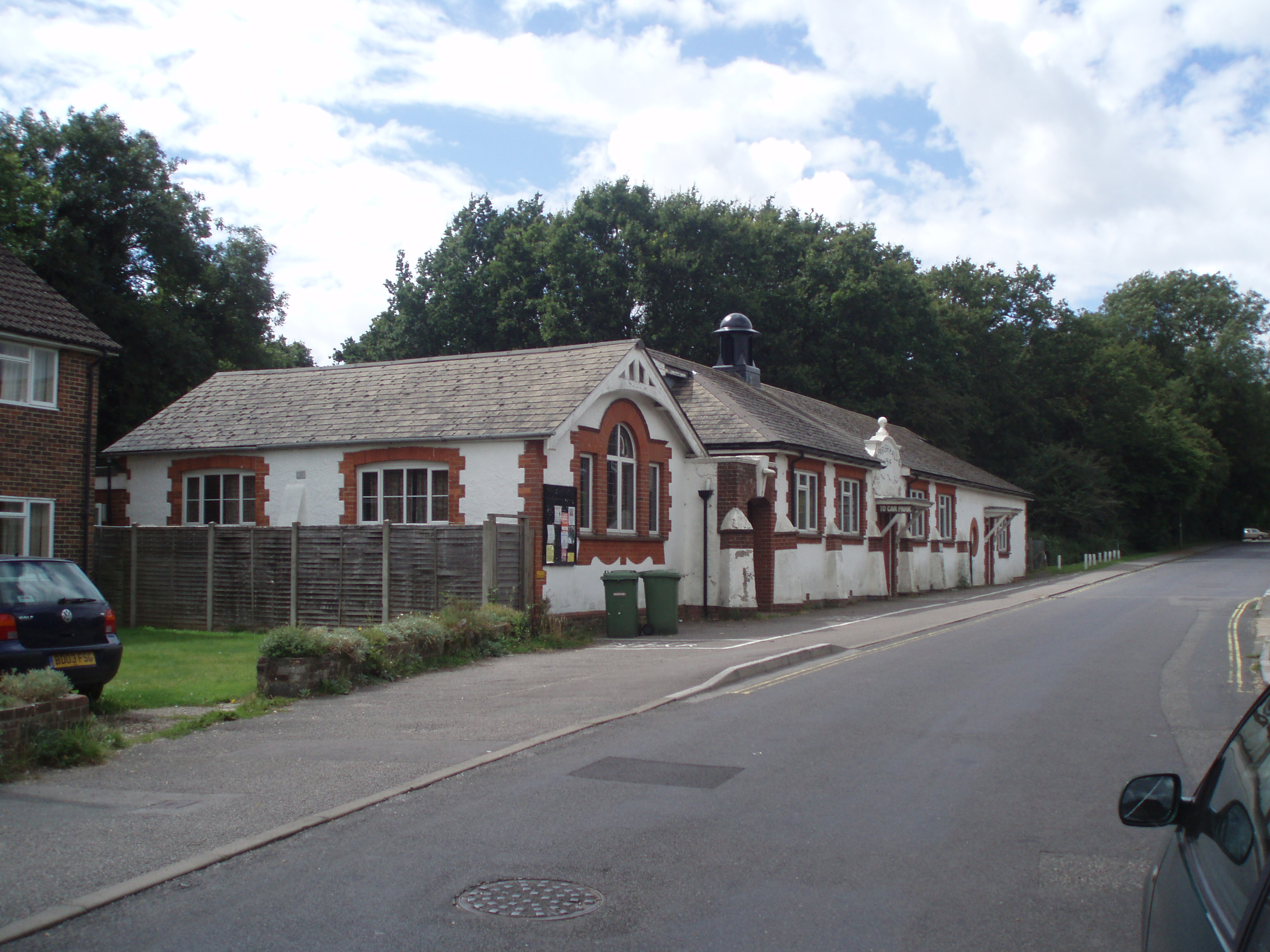
Parish Hall

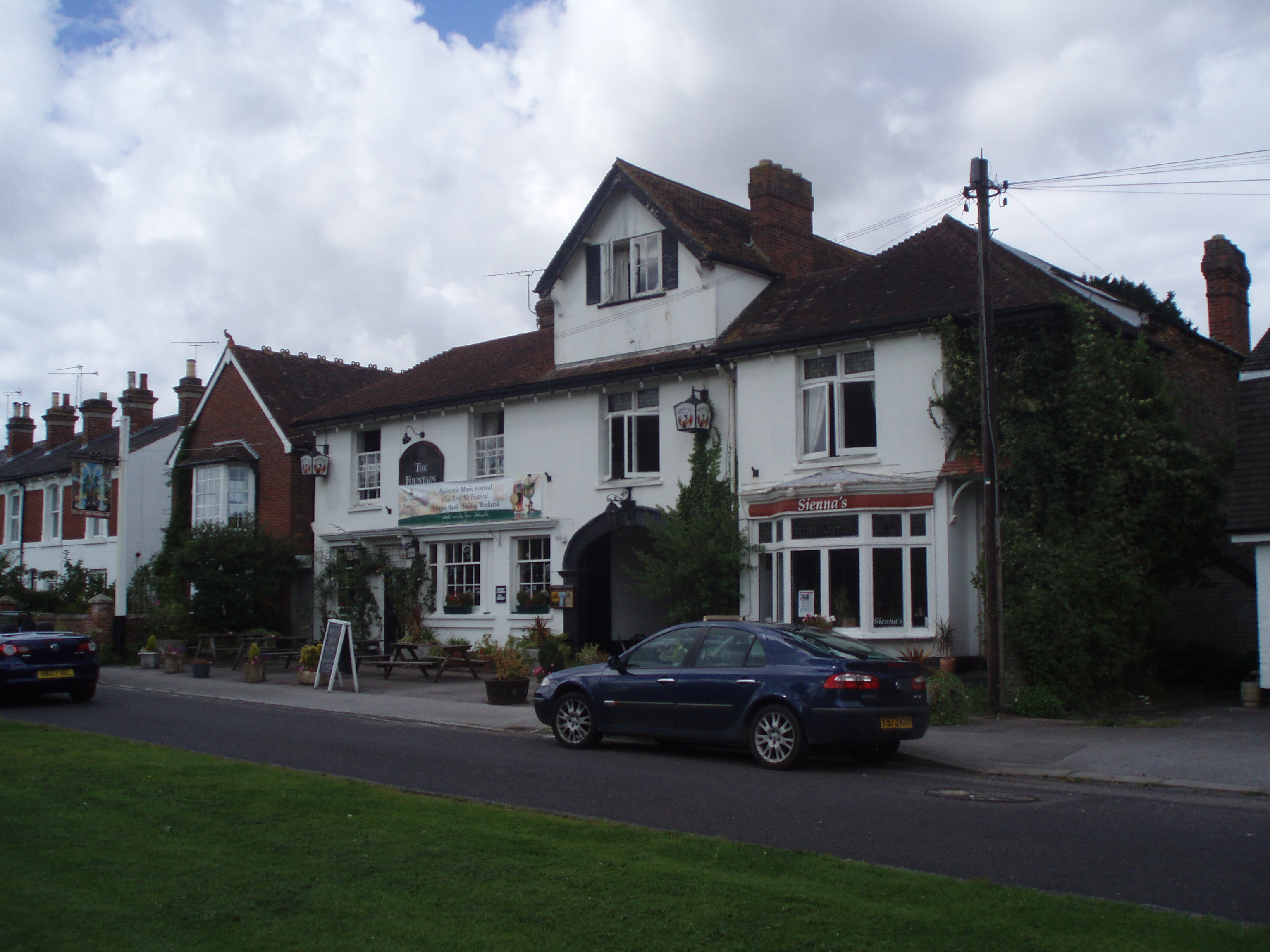
The Fountain (live music venue)

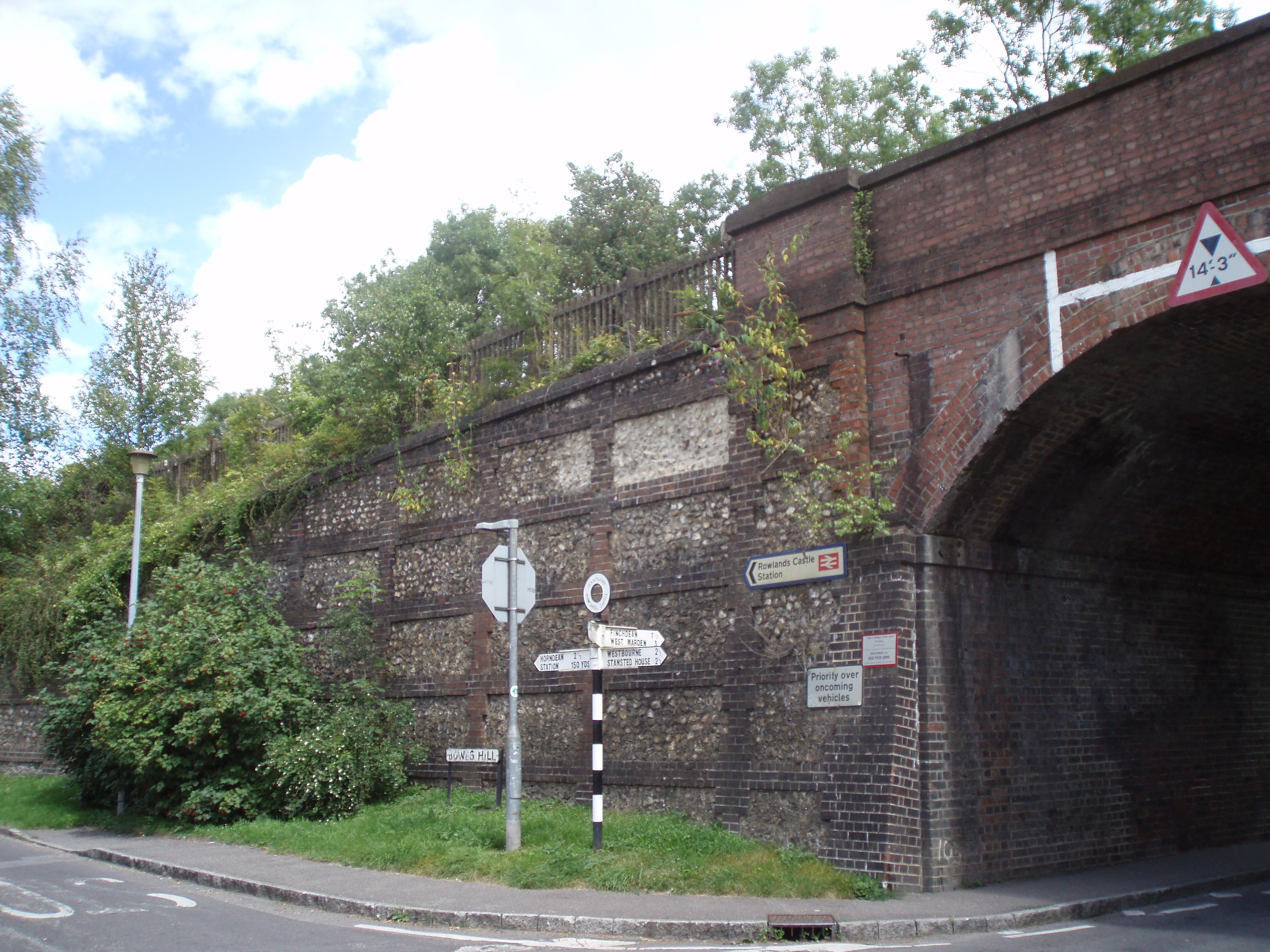
Bowes Hill Junction
