= Horndean =

Village and civil parish in Hampshire, England

Coordinates: 50°54′49″N 0°59′46″W

- Village and civil parish
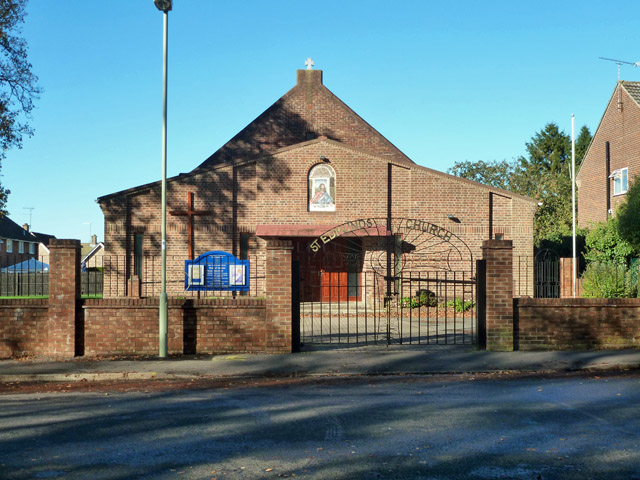
- St. Edmund's Church

- Location within Hampshire
- Population: 12,639; 12,942 (2011 Census including Catherington and Lovedean)
- OS grid reference: SU706131
- Civil parish: Horndean
- District: East Hampshire
- Shire county: Hampshire
- Region: South East
- Country: England
- Sovereign state: United Kingdom
- Post town: WATERLOOVILLE
- Postcode district: PO8
- Dialling code: 023
- Police: Hampshire and Isle of Wight
- Fire: Hampshire and Isle of Wight
- Ambulance: South Central
- UK Parliament: East Hampshire

Horndean is a village and civil parish in the East Hampshire district, in Hampshire, England, 8 miles (13 km) north of Portsmouth.

The nearest railway station is 2.2 miles (3.5 km) southeast of the village at Rowlands Castle.

The village had a population of 12,942 at the 2011 Census, and shares the semi-rural character of others in the district.

The village was the home of Gales Brewery from 1850. In 2005, it was bought by Fuller, Smith and Turner, who closed it in 2006, when it was converted to shops and flats.

== History ==
Horndean expanded in the early Middle Ages due to its convenient position as a staging post on the road from Portsmouth to London (now the A3). In 1836 it became home to the Hon. Sir Charles Napier Senior, father to the more famous Sir Charles Napier, who purchased a property in the village called The Grove but subsequently changed its name to Merchistoun Hall (named after his former home in Falkirk, Scotland). Merchistoun Hall is now a Grade II listed building and serves as the village's major community centre. Horndean was bypassed by main line railways but was served by trams of the Portsdown and Horndean Light Railway until 1935 and thereafter by buses.

A three-storey workhouse was built during Victorian times to home the local poor. This stood on a site currently developed into a large retirement complex in 2017/18. This building had served a number of purposes including a local swimming pool. This was its primary function during the 1970s, provided by the use of a large polythene lined 'tank' on its ground floor.

Using the pool was a fairly unpleasant experience by today's standards due to its small size, lack of poolside space and most of all - daylight. The first and second floors were used in latter years as a small lampshade factory. Defunct and dangerous, the entire building was demolished in spring 1982, leaving a small building that was closed and eventually demolished with the construction of the new retirement development in 2017.

The village experienced significant expansion in the 20th century, particularly with the building of the Hazleton estate on the former grounds of Merchistoun Hall in the early 1960s, and the building of the A3(M) motorway in the 1970s, which passes under a bridge adjacent to the village centre. The easy access to the motorway has encouraged an influx of light industry to the village, most of it concentrated in three major estates, the most recent of which is Hazelton Interchange, built in the early 1990s. The centre of the village has a 1960s built small shopping precinct which is home to specialist businesses, as well as a cafe, fast food and newsagent.

In 1992, Horndean was the site of the high-profile child murder of Helen Gorrie, who was found strangled to death after going out one night to meet local man John Corcoran. He was convicted of the murder in 1999 but was released on a technicality in 2003 and moved back to Warren Park in Havant. Her murder remains officially unsolved.

== Toponymy ==
Dean refers to the old English word "denu" meaning valley, and the name Horndean most likely means "valley by a horn-shaped hill" (the horn-shaped hill probably being Horndean Down). Alternatively "Harne" is the old English word for Dormouse making it "valley of the Dormouse". The second part of the name, Dean, can also mean forest, giving rise to further connotations.

== Community ==
Horndean's major community centres are Horndean Community Association at Merchistoun Hall and Barton Hall, Horndean Technology College. There is also a youth centre, RKdia. Other venues include Napier Hall, which was partially rebuilt in 2004, and the Jubilee Hall, opened in 2002. The two C of E churches in the area are Holy Trinity at Blendworth and All Saints in neighbouring Catherington. In 2020, Hampshire County Council announced plans to close Horndean library.

The surrounding villages are Catherington, Cowplain, Blendworth, Rowlands Castle and Clanfield.

== Sport and leisure ==
Horndean has a Non-League football club Horndean F.C., which plays at Five Heads Park.

== Twinning ==
The village of Horndean has been 'twinned' with the town of Aubergenville in France since 1998. Various activities and exchange visits are organised by the Horndean Parish Twinning Association.

- Aubergenville, France

== Politics ==
Since 2024, Horndean has been in the East Hampshire constituency for elections to the House of Commons and the MP is Damian Hinds of the Conservative Party.

== Media ==
ITV Meridian and BBC South are the local ITV and BBC television franchises. Both are received from the Rowridge transmitting station, on the Isle of Wight (though some parts towards Clanfield use the Horndean relay transmitter, which uses Rowridge as the signal feed for the relay station).

Radio services are received from Chillerton Down, on the Isle of Wight.

The local newspapers and publications are The Village News (free) and The News.
