= Staunton Country Park =

Parkland and forest in Hampshire, England

Coordinates: 50.88°N 0.98°W

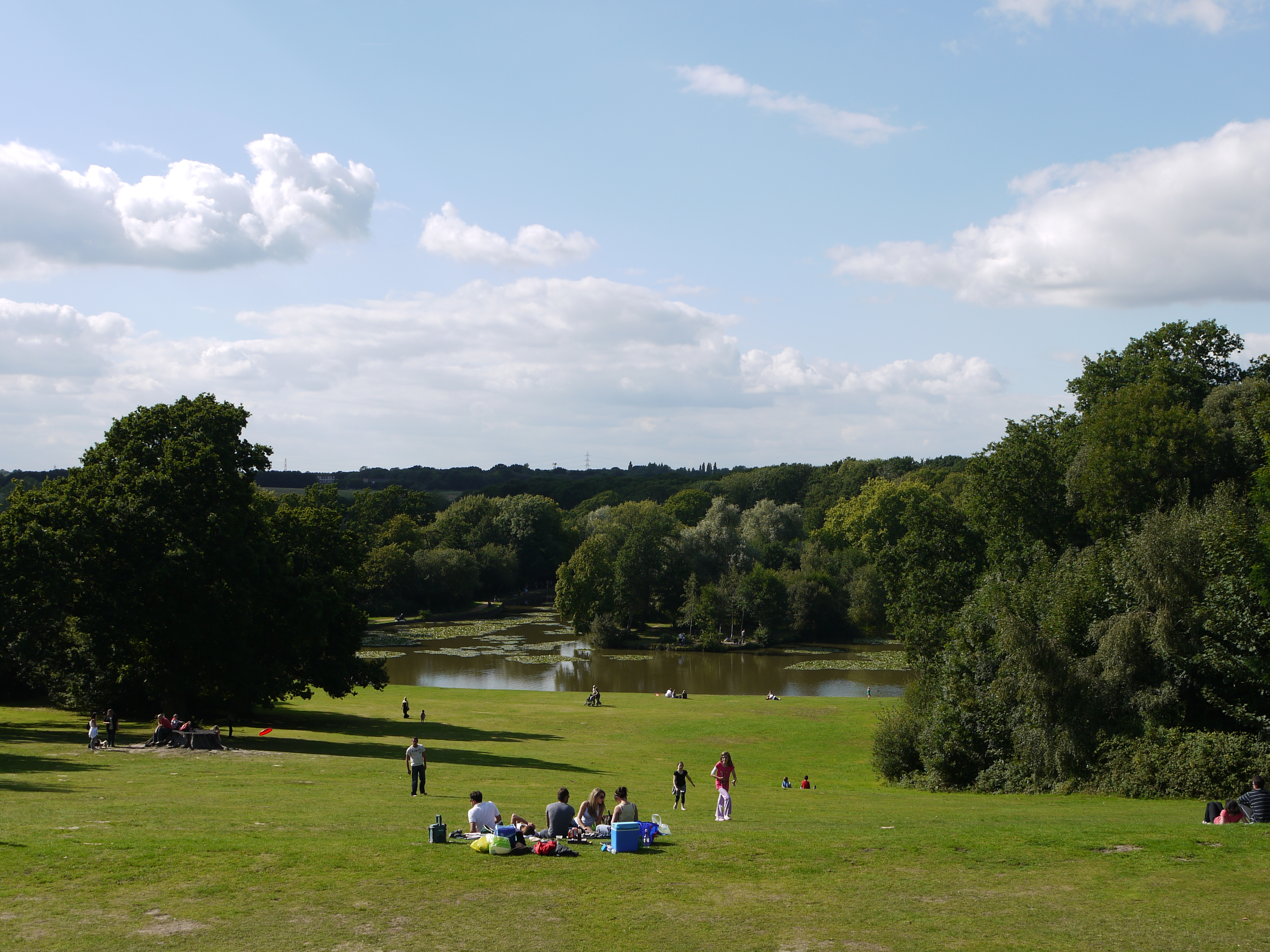
The lake viewed from the site of William Henry Stone's house. The island is the one that originally housed a cottage.

Staunton Country Park is a listed Regency landscaped parkland and forest encompassing approximately 1,000 acres (4.0 km^{2}) situated at Leigh Park between Havant and Rowlands Castle in Hampshire, England.

Composed of parkland with ornamental lake, walks, woodland and follies and a farm area with animals, walled garden, glasshouses, and maze. While entry to the parkland itself is free there is a cost for entering the farm zone and its attractions.

== History ==
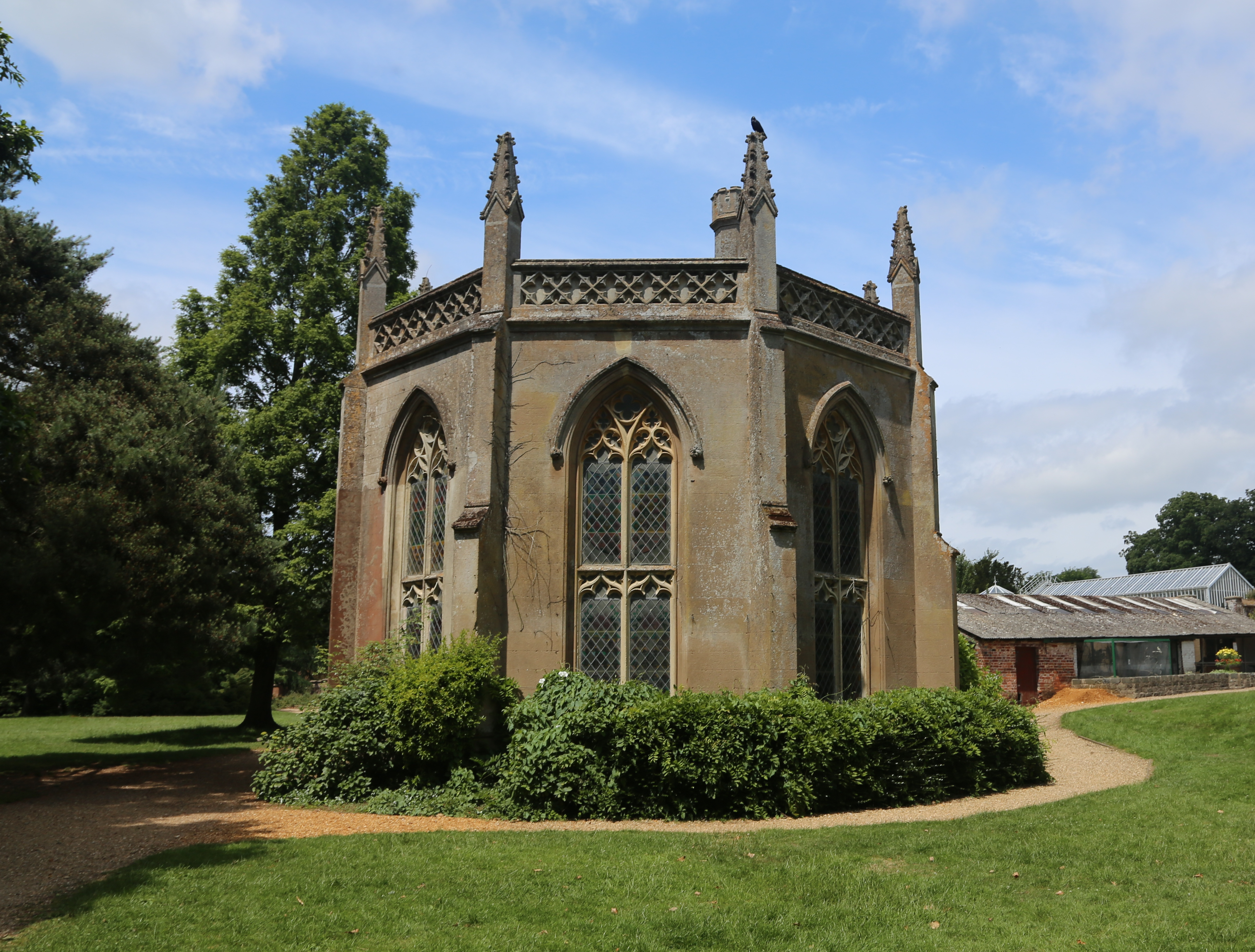
The Gothic library

The whole area has had a long history with evidence of a Roman Road running between Havant and Rowlands Castle, a site of Roman pottery production. During medieval times small villages and hamlets grew up around agricultural practices and the movement of animals to and from the Thicket and Forest of Bere. On early maps the hamlet of West Leigh can be seen to have a farm, large residence, and several houses. This residence was from 1793 inhabited by Samuel Harrison who either enhanced or rebuilt what was already there.

Harrison had already created a fenced park and it is this that William Garrett purchased in 1802. He not only extended the existing house in a Regency style but also acquired lands from his neighbours and enhanced what was there to create a 'ferme ornee', garden structures, and ornamental gardens. In 1817 the park was sold to John Julius Angerstein but in 1819 the sale was reversed after Angerstein brought a case against Garrett over non disclosure of dry rot. Garrett then put the estate back on the market.

The park was purchased in 1820 by sinophile, Regency politician and horticulturist Sir George Thomas Staunton as part of his country estate 'Leigh Park'. He made significant changes and additions to the gardens with the construction of the lake and a number of follies. He also commissioned a Gothic style library as an extension to the house that was completed in 1833. On his death in 1859 the estate and gardens were inherited by Staunton's cousin Henry Cormick Lynch. Henry Lynch died just six weeks after receiving his inheritance and it was in turn passed to his eldest son George Staunton Lynch who then changed his name to George Staunton Lynch-Staunton.

In 1861 he in turn sold the gardens and the estate to William Henry Stone for £60,000. Stone not liking the position of the Regency house demolished it and, using bricks from his new estate brickyard, built a Gothic Mansion overlooking the lake. Finished in 1865 this change of focus to the Northern part of the park also saw some of Staunton's follies removed and an avenue created running from the house to an upper bathing lake with a Boathouse and Bathing house.

Stone's tenure was relatively short as he sold the estate and gardens to Frederick Fitzwygram in 1875. Fitzwygram, a renowned army veterinarian, continued to manage the estate as it was intended and when he died in 1904 the park and estate passed to his son Frederick Loftus Fitzwygram. Dying in 1920 the estate passed to his sister Angela Fitzwygram who continue to live at the house till round about 1936 when she sold most of the southern half to a developer and moved away .

The house was requisitioned by the MOD in 1941 for use by HMS Vernon responsible for mine disposal and mine countermeasures. Following the war in June 1944 Portsmouth City Council (PCC) purchased the house, estate, and gardens along with the portion previously sold in order to create the new housing estate of Leigh Park. With the gardens subsequently transferred to the parks committee in 1950 the farm and park started to take on its current function. Unfortunately following the MOD's exit in 1956 and unable to find a suitable use for Stone's House, by 1959 PCC had no option but to have it demolished.

What remained of the estate was eventually transferred to Hampshire County Council and established as a Country park in 1987. Following several attempts in the late 1990s and early 2000s in 2017 the park received lottery funding to revitalise the park, reinstate the landscape, carry out conservation work on its follies, and construct a visitor centre within the park's old Coach House. Reinstating some of the former glory while both Staunton's and Stone's house no longer exist the Gothic Library from Staunton's Regency house and the Coachhouse & Stables from Stone's Gothic Mansion still remain. Used by people of all ages from places far and wide Staunton Country Park has hosted Havant parkrun since 16 June 2012.

== Leigh Water and its follies/structures ==
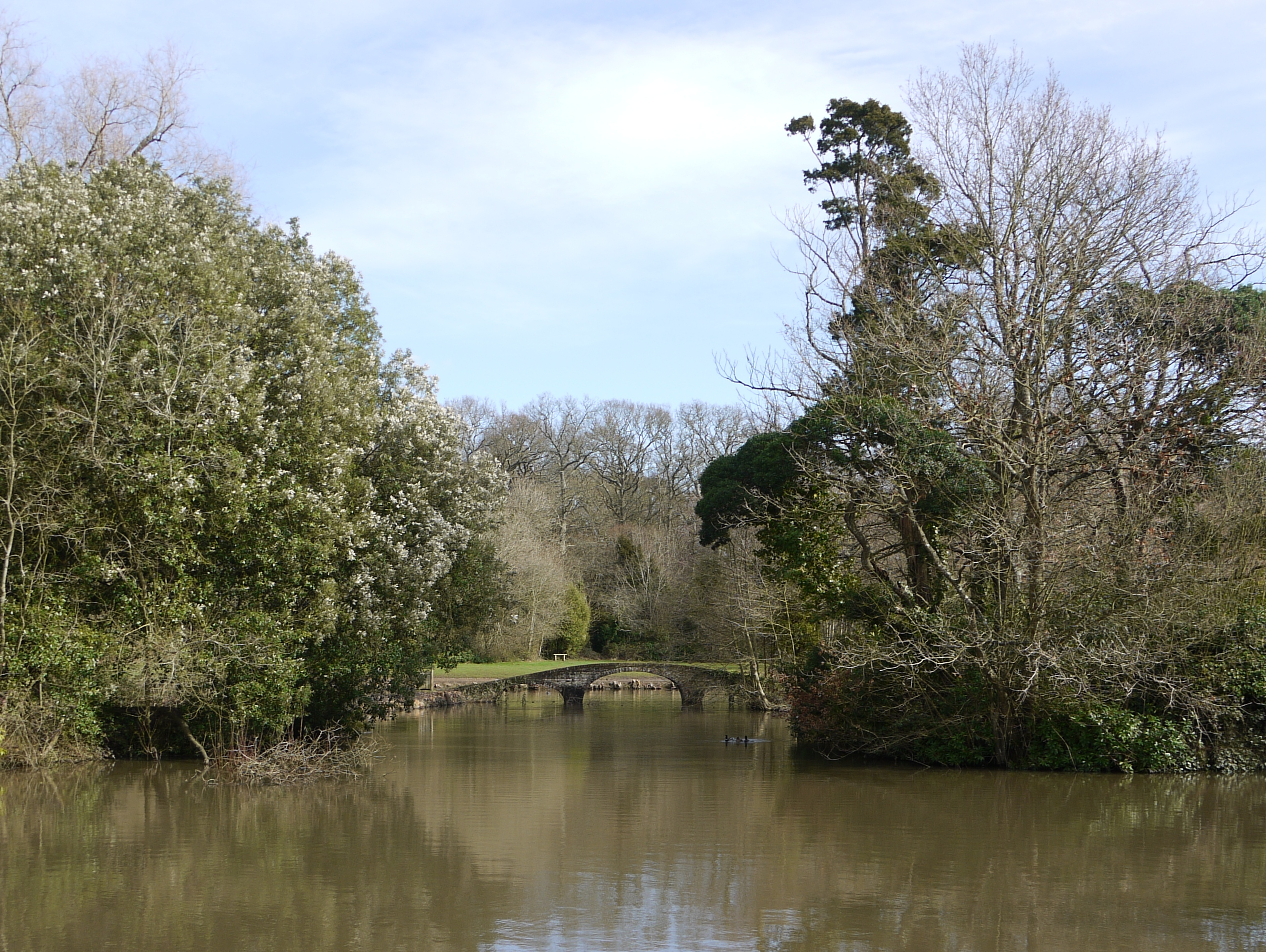
The remaining parts of the Chinese bridge seen between two islands in 2011

The park contains a man made lake called Leigh water constructed by Staunton between 1828 and 1836 on the site of a watering hole a few yards in diameter.

The lake is home to a number of islands, on the largest of which was a cottage used to house the under-gardener whose job it was to look after the lake area. A smaller island was originally home to a small fort set up for nine guns and on which the flag of the Qing dynasty was flown. A third island was Swan Island which as its name suggests was used for swans.

On the North side, Water Meadow was a focus for several structures with a three arched bridge known as the Chinese Bridge built in 1830 leading onto Cottage Island. From the Chinese bridge visitors could gaze along a ride to Cannings Monument, built in 1832, some distance in the thicket. In 1832 two buildings were added; a boathouse apparently built to a Chinese design and a pergola. In either 1832 or 1834 an ornamental Turkish kiosk was added to the lakeside. It featured an onion dome surrounded by small minarets. On each side of the meadow were seating areas; in the west the Lookout and in the east the Green Arbour. In 1843 the statue of Diana, as Artemis the huntress, was place on the centre edge of the meadow. Gazing towards the lake she would have looked straight through the Chinese boathouse to the structures on the South side of the lake.

On the South Side, apart from the Fort mentioned above, a Chinese summer house was built in 1835 by the site of the lake. At the Western end of the lake the Corinthion Bridge, based on a design by Papworth, was added allowing visitors to access long Island.

Under Henry Stone the lake was expanded and an extra island added. He also had the cottage demolished and replaced by an American garden. Many of the surrounding follies/structures were also removed at this point when Stone undertook his landscape changes however it may be the state of them forced demolition anyway. The Chinese bridge remained but alterations were made to its appearance.

== Follies ==
Apart from those listed above, the park originally contained a number of follies/structures, of which the following still survive:

=== The Shell House ===
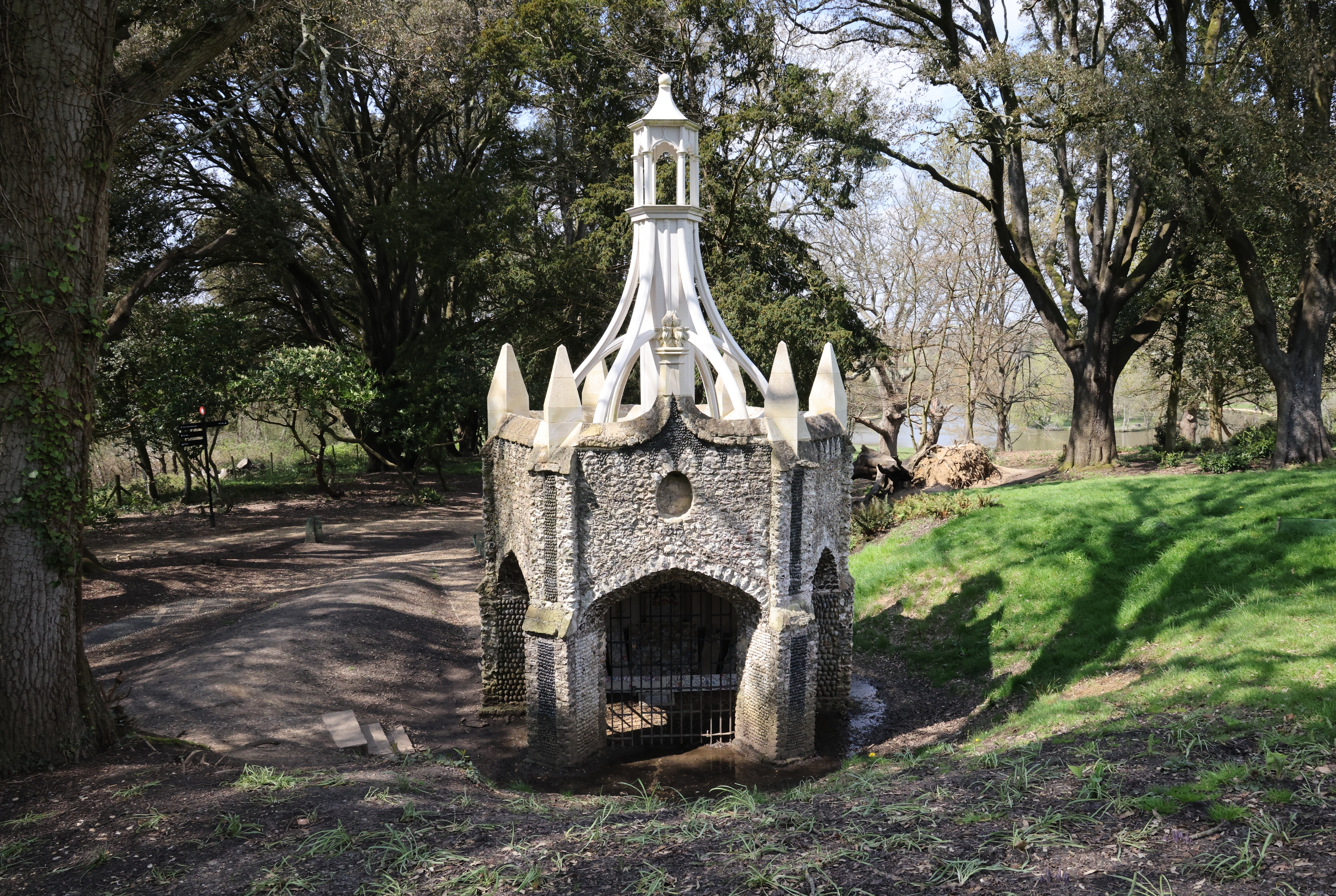
The Shell house in 2023

The Shell house, a Grade II* listed building, was built in 1828 and is covered in shells from Hayling Island. The house is hexagonal in shape and was based on the design of the Chichester Cross. By 1836 George Staunton was using the shell house as a museum of curiosities for such items as a stuffed crocodile and examples of Roman pottery.

=== The Beacon ===
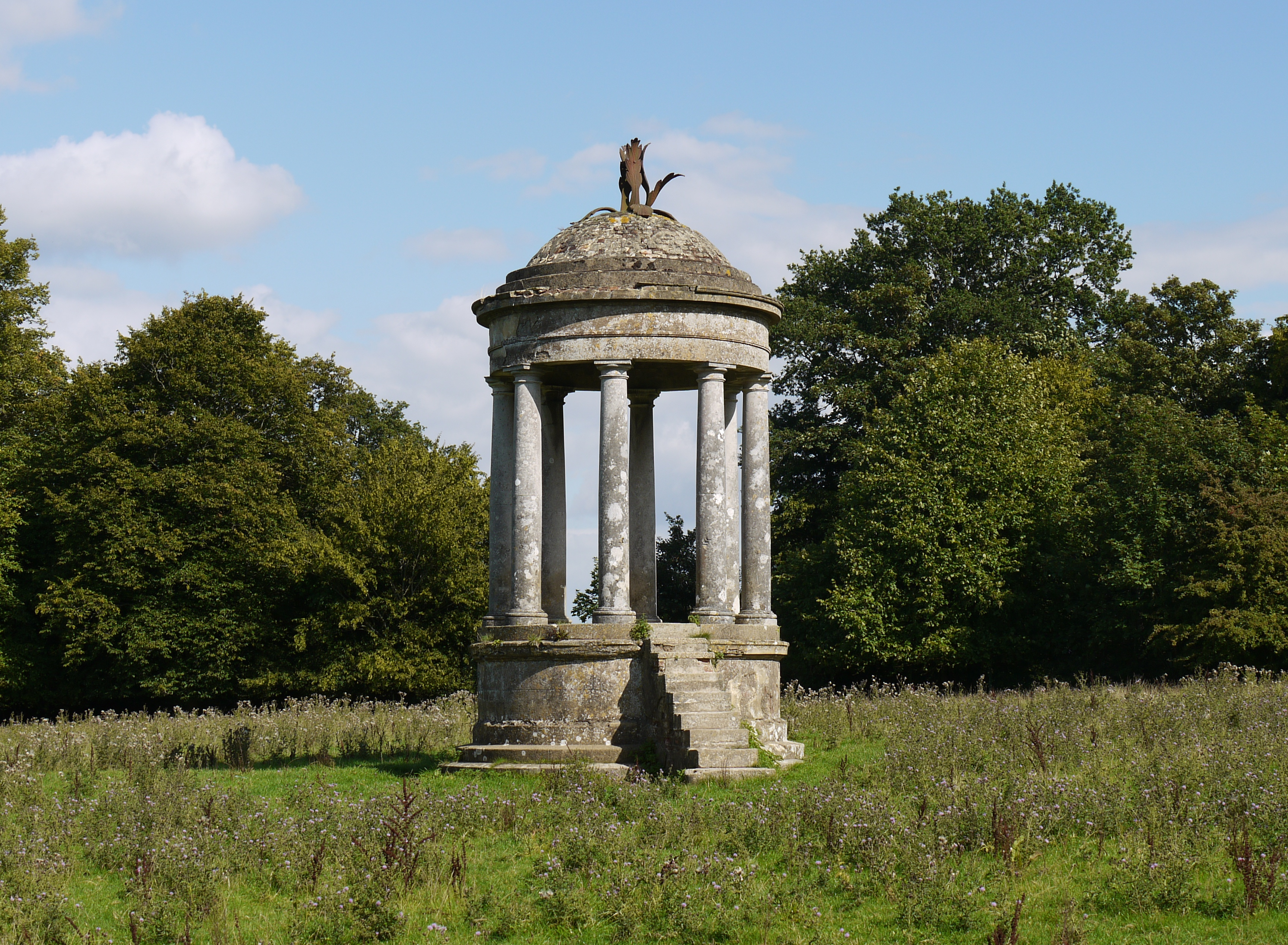
The Beacon in 2010

The beacon designed by Lewis Vulliamy is a folly built in 1830 in the style of a Tuscan order temple. It was largely built with material from the demolished Purbrook house and features a hole in a roof designed to allow a flag to be placed there. The roof is domed, with a plain frieze and architrave and supported by eight Tuscan columns. The beacon was restored in 2017 as part of a £3.5m Heritage Lottery grant for Staunton Country Park.

The follies/structures which do not survive include:

=== The Temple ===
A painting of the Temple by Joseph Francis Gilbert

The temple was a memorial commissioned by George Staunton in 1824 with a large memorial urn at its centre. As initially completed the temple contained dedications to Staunton's parents and further dedications to more distant relations and friends. In the following years an eight busts were added in a semi circle around the urn. Most of the busts were of friends of Staunton who had died after 1820 but one was of the then still living William Howley. In 1840 Staunton decided to add no further memorials to the temple. Further busts were added after this time but they were primarily of people still living. The temple was removed when William Henry Stone had his new home constructed on its site.

=== The Canning obelisk ===
The 50' obelisk was another Lewis Vulliamy design built in August 1832 to honour George Canning. Although noted as being still present in 1986, situated in the Thicket it appears to have been removed in 1960s during deforestation.

=== The Moss House ===
The moss house appears to have been built at some point in the first half of the 1830s and featured covered seat. The inside was lined with moss and the floor was made up of Emsworth pebbles of differing colours. It was removed in the 1860s as part of the building work undertaken by William Henry Stone.

=== The Election Column ===
The Election Column was erected in 1837 and initially featured the date of Staunton's then sole election victory and two defeats. A year later the date of his election as an MP for Portsmouth was added. The column was removed at some point during Stone's ownership of the park with the inscription recording Staunton's election victories being moved to the shell house.
