= East Hampshire (constituency) =

UK Parliament constituency (since 1983)

Coordinates: 51.09°N 0.98°W

- County constituency for the House of Commons
- Interactive map of boundaries from 2024
- Boundary of East Hampshire in South East England
- County: Hampshire
- Electorate: 69,959 (2023)
- Major settlements: Alton and Petersfield

Current constituency
- Created: 1983
- Member of Parliament: Damian Hinds (Conservative)
- Seats: One
- Created from: Petersfield, Aldershot and Basingstoke
- During its existence contributed to new seat(s) of: North East Hampshire (1997)

East Hampshire is a constituency (Note: A county constituency (for the purposes of election expenses and type of returning officer)) represented in the House of Commons of the UK Parliament since 2010 by Damian Hinds of the Conservative Party. (Note: As with all constituencies, the constituency elects one Member of Parliament (MP) by the first past the post system of election at least every five years.)

Further to the completion of the 2023 review of Westminster constituencies, the constituency was subject to major boundary changes. The town of Bordon moved to a majority Surrey constituency named Farnham and Bordon, first contested at the 2024 general election.

== Constituency profile ==
East Hampshire is a large rural constituency located in Hampshire. Most of the constituency lies within the South Downs National Park, a protected area of woodlands and chalk downs. The largest settlement is the town of Alton, which has a population of around 21,000. Other settlements include the town of Petersfield and the villages of Four Marks, Clanfield and Horndean. The area is highly affluent and house prices are considerably above the national average.

In general, residents are older and well-educated compared to the rest of the country. They have high levels of income and are more likely to work in professional occupations. White people made up 96% of the population at the 2021 census. At the local county and district councils, the rural areas of the constituency elected Conservative councillors whilst the towns are mostly represented by Liberal Democrats. An estimated 52% of voters in East Hampshire supported remaining in the European Union in the 2016 referendum compared to 48% nationwide.

== History ==
The seat was created in 1983 chiefly to replace the Petersfield constituency. The first MP was Michael Mates of the Conservative Party, who held it from 1983 until the calling of the 2010 election when he retired. He was replaced by fellow Conservative Damian Hinds, who has held the seat since.

Hinds achieved the 28th-highest vote share of his party in the 2017 General Election. The Liberal Democrats or its predecessor party the Liberals have finished second in all the general elections since 1983, bar:

- 2015, where this was the UKIP candidate,
- 2017 where this was the Labour candidate.

In 2024, the Liberal Democrats came within 2.5% of gaining the seat.

== Boundaries ==
Map of boundaries 2010–2024

1983–1997: The District of East Hampshire wards of Binsted, Bramshott and Liphook, Clanfield and Buriton, East Meon and Langrish, Froyle and Bentley, Froxfield and Steep, Grayshott, Headley, Horndean Catherington, Horndean Hazleton, Horndean Kings, Horndean Murray, Liss, Petersfield Heath, Petersfield St Mary's, Petersfield St Peter's, Rowlands Castle, Selborne, The Hangers, Whitehill Bordon and Whitehill, and Whitehill Lindford, and the District of Hart wards of Church Crookham, Crondall, Fleet Courtmoor, Fleet Pondtail, Fleet West, Hook, Long Sutton, and Odiham.

1997–2010: The District of East Hampshire wards of Alton Holybourne, Alton North East, Alton North West, Alton South East, Alton South West and Beech, Clanfield and Buriton, East Meon and Langrish, Farringdon, Four Marks, Froxfield and Steep, Horndean Catherington, Horndean Hazleton, Horndean Kings, Horndean Murray, Liss, Medstead, North Downland, Petersfield Heath, Petersfield St Mary's, Petersfield St Peter's, Ropley and West Tisted, Rowlands Castle, and The Hangers, and the Borough of Havant wards of Cowplain, Hart Plain, and Waterloo.

2010–2024: The District of East Hampshire wards of Alton Amery, Alton Ashdell, Alton Eastbrooke, Alton Westbrooke, Alton Whitedown, Alton Wooteys, Binstead and Bentley, Bramshott and Liphook, Downland, East Meon, Four Marks and Medstead, Froxfield and Steep, Grayshott, Headley, Holybourne and Froyle, Lindford, Liss, Petersfield Bell Hill, Petersfield Causeway, Petersfield Heath, Petersfield Rother, Petersfield St Mary's, Petersfield St Peter's, Ropley and Tisted, Selborne, The Hangers and Forest, Whitehill Chase, Whitehill Deadwater, Whitehill Hogmoor, Whitehill Pinewood, and Whitehill Walldown.

2024–present: Further to the 2023 review of Westminster constituencies which became effective for the 2024 general election, the constituency is composed of the following (as they existed on 1 December 2020):

- The Borough of Basingstoke and Deane ward of Oakley & The Candovers (part)
- The District of East Hampshire wards of Alton Amery, Alton Ashdell, Alton Eastbrooke, Alton Holybourne, Alton Westbrooke, Alton Whitedow, Alton Wooteys, Bentworth & Froyle, Binsted, Bentley & Selborne, Buriton & East Meon, Clanfield, Four Marks & Medstead, Froxfield, Sheet & Steep, Horndean Catherington, Horndean Downs, Horndean Kings & Blendworth, Horndean Murray, Liss, Petersfield Bell Hill, Petersfield Causeway, Petersfield Heath, Petersfield St. Peter's, Ropley, Hawkley & Hangers, and Rowlands Castle.

The town of Bordon (which forms part of the parish of Whitehill) and surrounding areas, comprising 36% of the 2010-2024 electorate, was moved to the new constituency of Farnham and Bordon. To compensate, the seat was expanded southwards again to re-include Horndean, which between 2010 and 2024 was part of the now abolished Meon Valley constituency. To ensure the electorate was within the permitted range, a small part of the Borough of Basingstoke and Deane ward of Oakley & The Candovers (the "Candovers") was also added.

== Members of Parliament ==
Petersfield, Aldershot and Basingstoke prior to 1983

Election	Member	Party	Notes
1983	Michael Mates	Conservative	Member for Petersfield (1974–1979)
2010	Damian Hinds	Conservative	Shadow Secretary of State for Education (2024)

== Elections ==
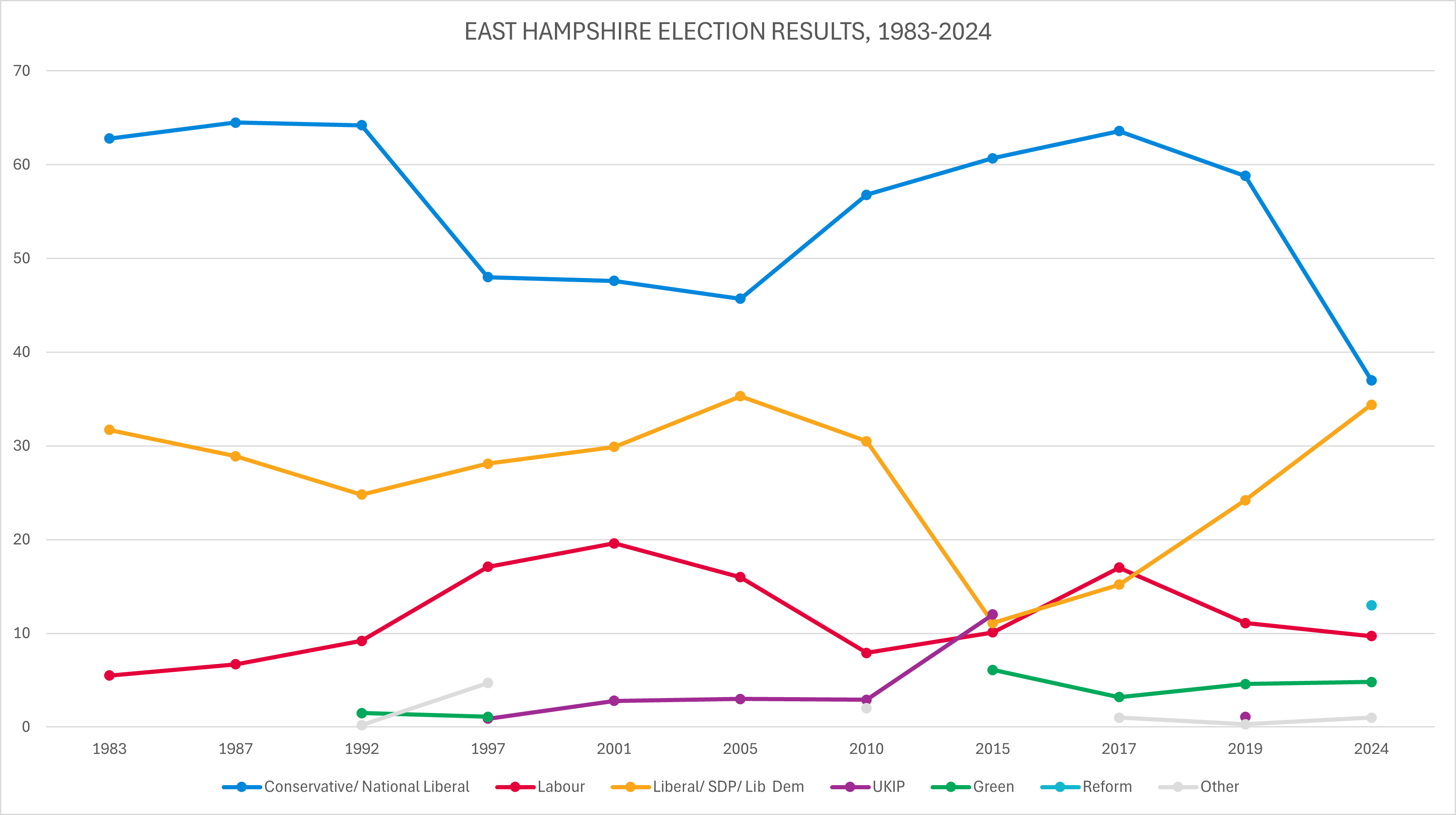
Election results 1983–2024

=== Elections in the 2020s ===
General election 2024: East Hampshire
Party	Candidate	Votes	%	±%
Conservative	Damian Hinds	18,509	37.0	−22.0
Liberal Democrats	Dominic Martin	17,234	34.4	+12.8
Reform	Matthew Kellermann	6,476	13.0	New
Labour	Lucy Sims	4,867	9.7	−2.6
Green	Richard Knight	2,404	4.8	−0.7
Hampshire Ind.	Jim Makin	364	0.7	New
SDP	Sara Smith	152	0.3	New
Majority		1,275	2.5	−34.8
Turnout		50,006	70.8	−6.6
Registered electors		71,965		
Conservative hold		Swing	−17.4	

=== Elections in the 2010s ===
2019 notional result
Party	Vote	%
Conservative	31,965	59.0
Liberal Democrats	11,765	21.7
Labour	6,662	12.3
Green	2,971	5.5
Others	812	1.5
Turnout	54,175	77.4
Electorate	69,959	

General election 2019: East Hampshire
Party	Candidate	Votes	%	±%
Conservative	Damian Hinds	33,446	58.8	−4.8
Liberal Democrats	David Buxton	13,750	24.2	+9.0
Labour	Gaynor Austin	6,287	11.1	−5.9
Green	Zoe Parker	2,600	4.6	+1.4
UKIP	Jim Makin	616	1.1	New
JAC	Eddie Trotter	196	0.3	−0.7
Majority		19,696	34.6	−12.0
Turnout		56,895	74.4	−0.3
Registered electors				
Conservative hold		Swing		

General election 2017: East Hampshire
Party	Candidate	Votes	%	±%
Conservative	Damian Hinds	35,263	63.6	+2.9
Labour	Rohit Dasgupta	9,411	17.0	+6.9
Liberal Democrats	Richard Robinson	8,403	15.2	+4.1
Green	Richard Knight	1,760	3.2	−2.9
JAC	Susan Jerrard	571	1.0	New
Majority		25,852	46.6	−2.1
Turnout		55,567	74.7	+2.0
Registered electors				
Conservative hold		Swing		

General election 2015: East Hampshire
Party	Candidate	Votes	%	±%
Conservative	Damian Hinds	31,334	60.7	+3.9
UKIP	Peter Baillie	6,187	12.0	+9.1
Liberal Democrats	Richard Robinson	5,732	11.1	−19.4
Labour	Alex Wilks	5,220	10.1	+2.2
Green	Peter Bisset	3,176	6.1	New
Majority		25,147	48.7	+22.4
Turnout		51,649	72.7	+1.7
Registered electors				
Conservative hold		Swing		

General election 2010: East Hampshire
Party	Candidate	Votes	%	±%
Conservative	Damian Hinds	29,137	56.8	+9.7
Liberal Democrats	Adam Carew	15,640	30.5	−3.5
Labour	Jane Edbrooke	4,043	7.9	−8.6
UKIP	Hugh McGuiness	1,477	2.9	+0.3
English Democrat	Matt Williams	710	1.4	New
JAC	Don Jerrard	310	0.6	New
Majority		13,467	26.3	+15.9
Turnout		51,317	71.0	+6.3
Registered electors		72,250		+1,785
Conservative hold		Swing	+6.6	

2005 notional result
Party	Vote	%
Conservative	21,441	47.0
Liberal Democrats	15,473	33.9
Labour	7,499	16.4
UKIP	1,176	2.6
Turnout	45,589	64.7
Electorate	70,465	

=== Elections in the 2000s ===
General election 2005: East Hampshire
Party	Candidate	Votes	%	±%
Conservative	Michael Mates	24,273	45.7	−1.9
Liberal Democrats	Ruth Bright	18,764	35.3	+5.4
Labour	Marjorie Broughton	8,519	16.0	−3.6
UKIP	David Samuel	1,583	3.0	+0.2
Majority		5,509	10.4	−7.3
Turnout		53,139	66.9	+2.6
Registered electors				
Conservative hold		Swing	−3.7	

General election 2001: East Hampshire
Party	Candidate	Votes	%	±%
Conservative	Michael Mates	23,950	47.6	−0.4
Liberal Democrats	Robert Booker	15,060	29.9	+1.8
Labour	Barbara Burfoot	9,866	19.6	+2.5
UKIP	Stephen Coles	1,413	2.8	+1.9
Majority		8,890	17.7	−2.2
Turnout		50,289	64.3	−11.3
Registered electors				
Conservative hold		Swing		

=== Elections in the 1990s ===
General election 1997: East Hampshire
Party	Candidate	Votes	%	±%
Conservative	Michael Mates	27,927	48.0	–12.6
Liberal Democrats	Robert Booker	16,337	28.1	+0.6
Labour	Robert Hoyle	9,945	17.1	+7.7
Referendum	John Hayter	2,757	4.7	New
Green	Ian Foster	649	1.1	–1.1
UKIP	Stephen Coles	513	0.9	New
Majority		11,590	19.9	–13.2
Turnout		58,128	75.9	−4.5
Registered electors		76,604		+2,856
Conservative hold		Swing	–6.6	

1992 notional result
Party	Vote	%
Conservative	35,960	60.6
Liberal Democrats	16,303	27.5
Labour	5,605	9.4
Others	1,451	2.4
Turnout	59,319	80.4
Electorate	73,748	

General election 1992: Hampshire East
Party	Candidate	Votes	%	±%
Conservative	Michael Mates	47,541	64.2	−0.3
Liberal Democrats	Susan Baring	18,376	24.8	−4.1
Labour	James Phillips	6,840	9.2	+2.5
Green	Ian Foster	1,113	1.5	New
Independent	Stanley Hale	165	0.2	New
Majority		29,165	39.4	+3.8
Turnout		74,035	79.3	+1.9
Registered electors				
Conservative hold		Swing	+1.9	

=== Elections in the 1980s ===
General election 1987: Hampshire East
Party	Candidate	Votes	%	±%
Conservative	Michael Mates	43,093	64.5	+1.7
Liberal	Robert Booker	19,307	28.9	−2.8
Labour	Colin Lloyd	4,443	6.7	+1.2
Majority		23,786	35.6	+4.5
Turnout		66,843	77.4	+3.2
Registered electors				
Conservative hold		Swing		

General election 1983: Hampshire East
Party	Candidate	Votes	%	±%
Conservative	Michael Mates	36,968	62.8	+3.2
Liberal	Rebecca Bryan	18,641	31.7	+7.3
Labour	Steven Cowan	3,247	5.5	–10.4
Majority		18,327	31.1	–4.1
Turnout		58,856	74.2	
Registered electors		79,303		
Conservative hold		Swing	–2.1	

1979 notional result
Party	Vote	%
Conservative	32,595	59.6
Liberal	13,328	24.4
Labour	8,687	15.9
Others	39	0.1
Turnout	54,649	
Electorate		

== See also ==
- Parliamentary constituencies in Hampshire
- List of parliamentary constituencies in the South East England (region)
