= East Hampshire =

Coordinates: 51.0055°N 0.9082°W

- Non-metropolitan district
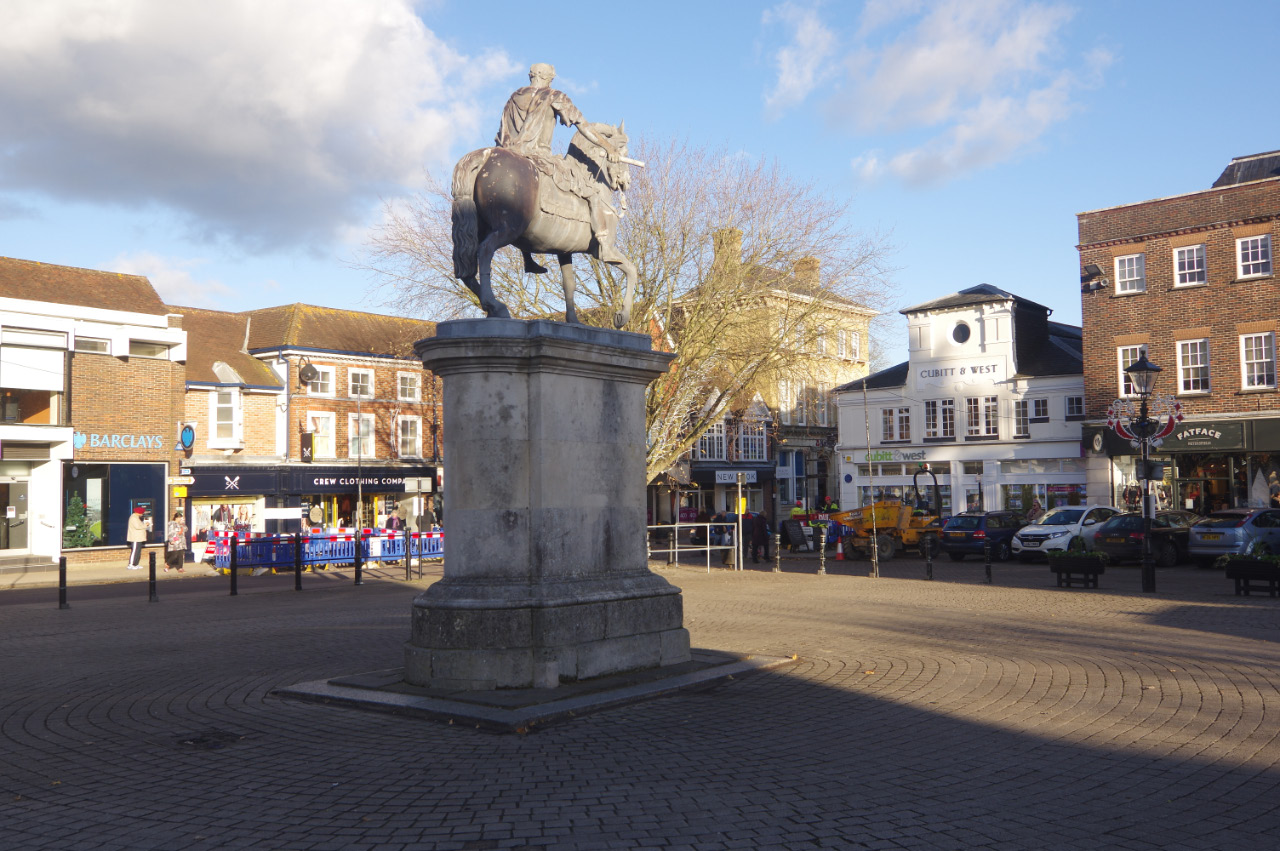
- Petersfield town centre

- East Hampshire shown within Hampshire
- Sovereign state: United Kingdom
- Constituent country: England
- Region: South East England
- Non-metropolitan county: Hampshire
- Status: Non-metropolitan district
- Admin HQ: Petersfield
- Incorporated: 1 April 1974

Government
  - Type: Non-metropolitan district council
  - Body: East Hampshire District Council
  - MPs: Damian Hinds; Greg Stafford

Area
  - Total: 198.6 sq mi (514.4 km^{2})
  - Rank: 76th (of 296)

Population (2025)
  - Total: 130,599
  - Rank: 188th (of 296)
  - Density: 657.6/sq mi (253.9/km^{2})

Ethnicity (2021)
  - Ethnic groups: List: 95.4% White; 1.9% Asian; 1.7% Mixed; 0.5% Black; 0.5% other

Religion (2021)
  - Religion: List: 51.1% Christianity; 40.9% no religion; 6.1% not stated; 0.6% Islam; 0.5% other; 0.3% Buddhism; 0.3% Hinduism; 0.2% Judaism; 0.1% Sikhism
- Time zone: UTC0 (GMT)
  - Summer (DST): UTC+1 (BST)
- ONS code: 24UC (ONS); E07000085 (GSS)
- OS grid reference: SU7659323528

East Hampshire is a local government district in Hampshire, England. Its council is based in the town of Petersfield, although the largest town is Alton. The district also contains the town of Bordon along with many villages and surrounding rural areas.

Parts of the district lie within the South Downs National Park. The neighbouring districts are Havant, Winchester, Basingstoke and Deane, Hart, Waverley and Chichester.

== History ==
East Hampshire was created on 1 April 1974 under the Local Government Act 1972, covering the area of four former districts which were all abolished at the same time:

- Alton Rural District
- Alton Urban District
- Petersfield Rural District
- Petersfield Urban District

The district was originally proposed to be called Petersfield. The shadow authority elected in 1973 to oversee the transition to the new system requested a change of name to East Hampshire, which was confirmed by the government on 8 October 1973, before the new district formally came into being.

Between 2009 and 2022 the council shared a chief executive with neighbouring Havant Borough Council.

In March 2026, the government announced that it would abolish the district in 2028 as part of local government reform across Hampshire. These proposals were withdrawn in September 2026.

== Governance ==
East Hampshire District Council

Type
- Type: Non-metropolitan district

Leadership
- Chair: Penny Flux, Whitehill & Bordon Community Party since 14 May 2026
- Leader: Richard Millard, Conservative since 18 May 2017
- Chief Executive: Dawn Adey since 23 April 2026

Structure
- Seats: 43 councillors
- Graph of the party split among 43 seats.
- Political groups: Administration (24) Conservative (18) WBCP (6) Other parties (19) Liberal Democrats (14) Green (1) Labour (1) Independent (3)

Elections
- Voting system: First past the post
- Last election: 4 May 2023

Meeting place
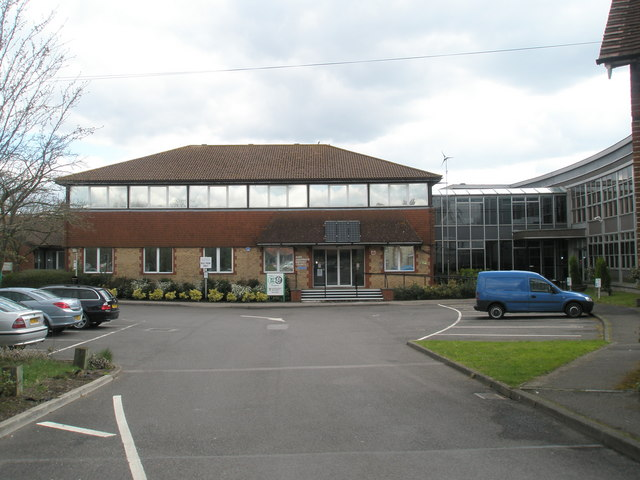
- Penns Place, Petersfield, GU31 4EX

Website
- www.easthants.gov.uk

East Hampshire District Council provides district-level services. County-level services are provided by Hampshire County Council. The whole district is covered by civil parishes, which form a third tier of local government.

In the parts of the district within the South Downs National Park, town planning is the responsibility of the South Downs National Park Authority. The district council appoints one of its councillors to serve on the 27-person National Park Authority.

=== Political control ===
The council has been under no overall control since the 2023 election, being led by a coalition of the Conservatives and local party the Whitehill and Bordon Community Party.

The first election to the council was held in 1973, initially operating as a shadow authority alongside the outgoing authorities until the new arrangements took effect on 1 April 1974. Political control of the council since 1974 has been as follows:

Party in control	Years
No overall control	1974–1976
Conservative	1976–1991
No overall control	1991–1995
Liberal Democrats	1995–1999
Conservative	1999–2023
No overall control	2023–present

=== Leadership ===
The leaders of the council since 1991 have been:

Councillor	Party	From	To
Peter Rodgers	Liberal Democrats	1991	1996
David Clark	Liberal Democrats	1996	1999
Elizabeth Cartwright	Conservative	1999	19 May 2004
Andrew Pattie	Conservative	19 May 2004	17 May 2006
Ferris Cowper	Conservative	17 May 2006	Oct 2009
David Parkinson	Conservative	9 Nov 2009	31 Aug 2010
Patrick Burridge	Conservative	13 Oct 2010	Feb 2012
Ken Moon	Conservative	20 Mar 2012	9 May 2013
Ferris Cowper	Conservative	9 May 2013	May 2017
Richard Millard	Conservative	18 May 2017	

=== Composition ===
Following the 2023 election, and subsequent changes up to March 2026, the composition of the council was:

Party	Councillors
Conservative	18
Liberal Democrats	14
Whitehill & Bordon Community Party	6
Green	1
Labour	1
Independent	3
Total	43

=== Premises ===
The council is based at Penns Place on the eastern outskirts of Petersfield.

=== Elections ===
Since the last boundary changes in 2019 the council has comprised 43 councillors representing 31 wards, with each ward electing one, two or three councillors. Elections are held every four years.

East Hampshire District Council Election Results 2023

== Settlements and parishes ==
East Hampshire is entirely covered by civil parishes. The parish councils of Alton, Petersfield and Whitehill (where the largest settlement is Bordon) take the style "town council". Some of the smaller parishes have a parish meeting rather than a parish council.

Settlements in East Hampshire include:

- Alton
- Beech, Bentley, Bentworth, Binsted, Blackmoor, Blendworth, Bordon, Bramshott, Bucks Horn Oak, Buriton
- Catherington, Chawton, Clanfield, Colemore
- East Meon, East Tisted, East Worldham, Empshott
- Farringdon, Finchdean, Four Marks, Froxfield
- Golden Pot, Grayshott, Greatham
- Hawkley, Headley, Headley Down, High Cross, Holybourne, Horndean
- Kingsley
- Langrish, Lasham, Lindford, Liphook, Liss, Lower Froyle, Lower Wield
- Medstead
- Neatham, Newton Valence, North Street
- Petersfield, Priors Dean
- Ropley, Ropley Dean, Rowlands Castle
- Selborne, Shalden, Sheet, Steep, Stroud
- Upper Froyle, Upper Wield
- West Tisted, West Worldham, Weston, Whitehill

== Media ==
=== Television ===
Local TV coverage for the area is served by BBC South and ITV Meridian.

=== Radio ===
Radio stations for the area are:

- BBC Radio Surrey
- BBC Radio Solent
- BBC Radio Sussex can also be received
- Heart South
- Easy Radio South Coast
- Greatest Hits Radio Surrey & East Hampshire
- Wey Valley Radio, a community based station which broadcasts from Alton.
