= PO postcode area =

Postcode area within the United Kingdom

Portsmouth
- Postcode area
- Coordinates: 50.799°N 1.049°W
- Country: United Kingdom
- Postcode area: PO
- Postcode area name: Portsmouth
- Post towns: 24
- Postcode districts: 34
- Postcode sectors: 130
- Postcodes (live): 24,016
- Postcodes (total): 32,790
- Statistics as at May 2020

The PO postcode area, also known as the Portsmouth postcode area, is a group of 34 postcode districts in southern England, within 24 post towns. These cover south-east Hampshire (including Portsmouth, Southsea, Havant, Waterlooville, Lee-on-the-Solent, Gosport, Fareham, Rowland's Castle, Emsworth and Hayling Island), southwestern West Sussex (including Chichester and Bognor Regis) and the Isle of Wight.

== Coverage ==
The approximate coverage of the postcode districts:

Postcode district	Post town	Coverage	Local authority area(s)
PO1	PORTSMOUTH	Old Portsmouth, Portsea, HMNB Portsmouth, Landport, Buckland, Fratton, Kingston	Portsmouth
PO2	PORTSMOUTH	Kingston, Rudmore, Whale Island, North End, Stamshaw, Tipner, Hilsea	Portsmouth
PO3	PORTSMOUTH	Hilsea (including Anchorage Park), Copnor, Baffins	Portsmouth
PO4	SOUTHSEA	Milton, Eastney, Southsea, Horse Sand Fort	Portsmouth
PO5	SOUTHSEA	Southsea, Somerstown, Spitbank Fort	Portsmouth
PO6	PORTSMOUTH	Farlington, Drayton, Cosham, Wymering, Paulsgrove, Port Solent	Portsmouth
PO7	WATERLOOVILLE	Waterlooville, Denmead, Purbrook	Havant, Winchester
PO8	WATERLOOVILLE	Clanfield, Cowplain, Horndean	East Hampshire, Havant
PO9	HAVANT	Havant	Havant
PO9	ROWLANDS CASTLE	Rowland's Castle	East Hampshire, Havant
PO10	EMSWORTH	Emsworth, Southbourne, Westbourne	Chichester, Havant
PO11	HAYLING ISLAND	Hayling Island	Havant
PO12	GOSPORT	Gosport, Alverstoke, Hardway	Gosport
PO13	GOSPORT	Gosport	Gosport
PO13	LEE-ON-THE-SOLENT	Lee-on-the-Solent	Gosport
PO14	FAREHAM	Fareham, Hill Head, Stubbington, Titchfield	Fareham
PO15	FAREHAM	Fareham, Titchfield, Whiteley	Fareham
PO16	FAREHAM	Portchester	Fareham
PO17	FAREHAM	Wickham	Winchester
PO18	CHICHESTER	Bosham, Boxgrove, Eartham, East Dean, Goodwood, Funtington, Nutbourne	Chichester
PO19	CHICHESTER	Chichester, Fishbourne	Chichester
PO20	CHICHESTER	Selsey, West Wittering, East Wittering, Tangmere, Oving, Westergate, Eastergate	Arun, Chichester
PO21	BOGNOR REGIS	Bognor Regis, Aldwick, Pagham	Arun
PO22	BOGNOR REGIS	Bognor Regis, Barnham, Elmer, Felpham, Middleton-on-Sea	Arun
PO24	PORTSMOUTH	Census 2021 (its main national office)	non-geographic
PO30	NEWPORT	Newport	Isle of Wight
PO31	COWES	Cowes, Gurnard	Isle of Wight
PO32	EAST COWES	East Cowes, Whippingham	Isle of Wight
PO33	RYDE	Ryde, St Helens Fort	Isle of Wight
PO34	SEAVIEW	Seaview, No Man's Land Fort	Isle of Wight
PO35	BEMBRIDGE	Bembridge, Whitecliff Bay	Isle of Wight
PO36	SANDOWN	Sandown	Isle of Wight
PO37	SHANKLIN	Shanklin	Isle of Wight
PO38	VENTNOR	Ventnor	Isle of Wight
PO39	TOTLAND BAY	Totland Bay, Alum Bay	Isle of Wight
PO40	FRESHWATER	Freshwater	Isle of Wight
PO41	YARMOUTH	Yarmouth	Isle of Wight

== Map ==
PO postcode area map, showing postcode districts in red and post towns in grey text, with links to nearby BN, GU, RH and SO postcode areas.

== See also ==
- Postcode Address File
- List of postcode areas in the United Kingdom
