= East Hampshire District Council elections =

Local government elections in Hampshire, England

East Hampshire District Council elections are held every four years to elect councillors to East Hampshire District Council in Hampshire, England. Since the last boundary changes in 2019 the council has comprised 43 councillors representing 31 wards, with each ward electing one, two or three councillors.

== Council elections ==
Composition of the council
Year	Conservative	Liberal Democrats (Note: Includes totals for the predecessors of the Liberal Democrats, the Liberal Party and SDP (both of which participated in the Alliance).)	Labour	Green (Note: Includes totals for the predecessors of the Green Party of England and Wales, the Ecology Party and Green Party UK.)	Independents & Others	Council control after election
Local government reorganisation; council established (42 seats)
1973	16	0	6	–	20	No overall control
1976	31	0	0	0	11	No overall control
New ward boundaries (42 seats)
1979	32	2	0	0	8	Conservative
1983	30	5	0	0	7	Conservative
1987	26	11	0	0	5	Conservative
1991	16	20	0	0	6	No overall control
1995	12	26	0	0	4	Liberal Democrats
1999	21	17	0	0	3	Conservative
New ward boundaries (44 seats)
2003	26	18	0	0	0	Conservative
2007	30	14	0	0	0	Conservative
2011	39	5	0	0	0	Conservative
2015	42	2	0	0	0	Conservative
New ward boundaries (43 seats)
2019	32	7	2	0	2	Conservative
2023	19	14	1	2	6 (Note: 6 Whitehill & Borden Community Party)	No overall control

== District result maps ==
2003 results map

2007 results map

2011 results map

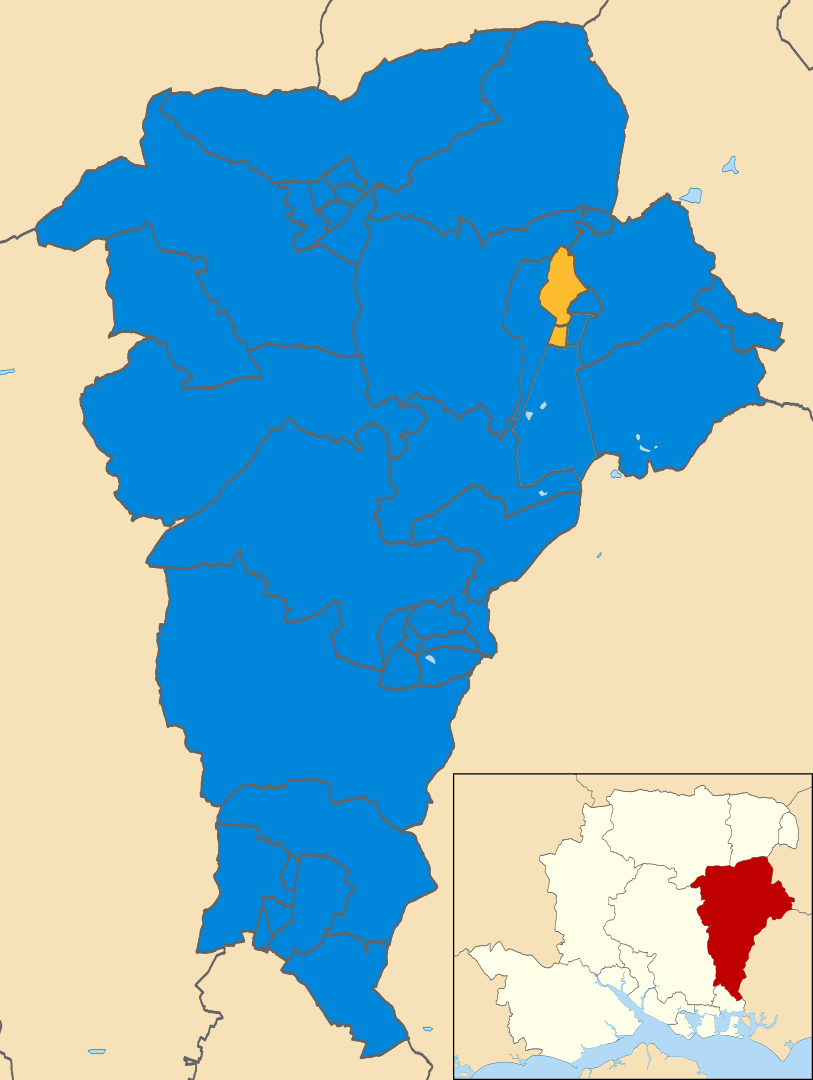
2015 results map

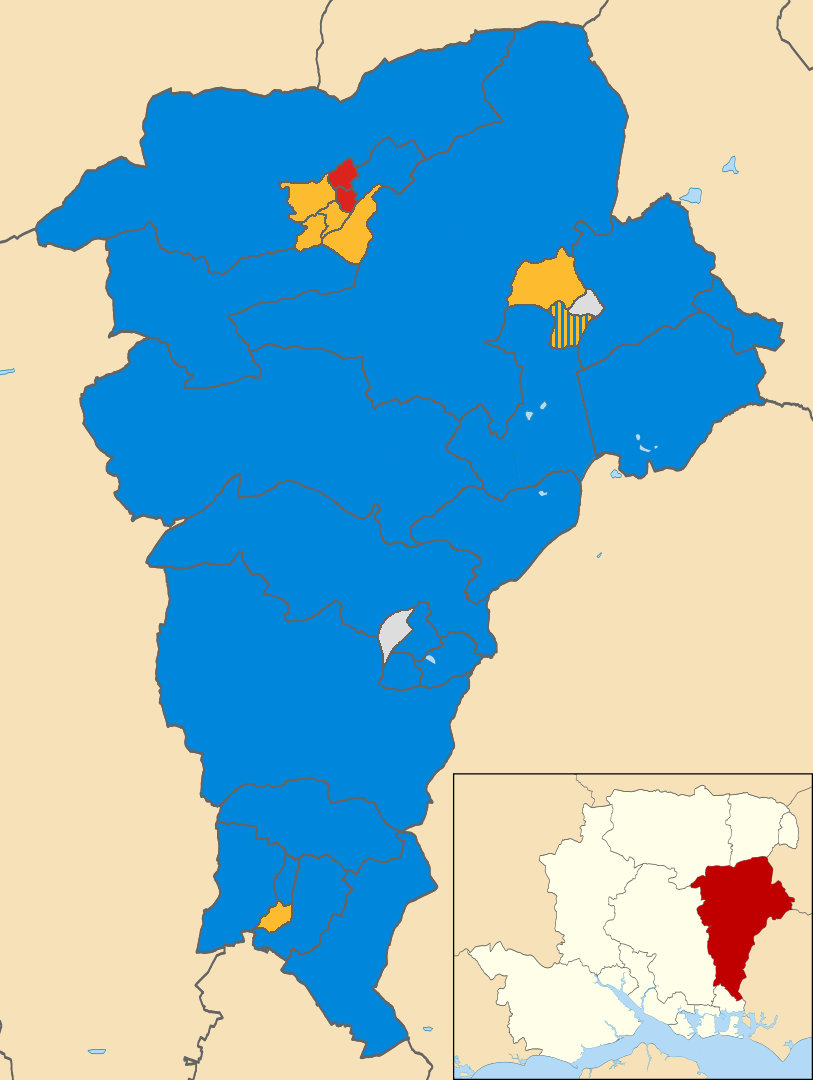
2019 results map

2023 results map

== By-election results ==
=== 1995-1999 ===
Hangers By-Election 14 November 1996
Party	Candidate	Votes	%	±%
Conservative		277	59.1	
Liberal Democrats		192	40.9	
Majority		85	18.2	
Turnout		469	44.8	
Conservative gain from Independent		Swing		

Alton North East By-Election 12 December 1996
Party	Candidate	Votes	%	±%
Liberal Democrats		452	54.0	
Labour		276	33.0	
Conservative		108	13.0	
Majority		176	21.0	
Turnout		836	26.5	
Liberal Democrats hold		Swing		

Froxfield & Steep By-Election 22 January 1998
Party	Candidate	Votes	%	±%
Conservative		415	60.5	+8.6
Liberal Democrats		271	39.5	−8.6
Majority		144	21.0	
Turnout		686	45.8	
Conservative hold		Swing		

Petersfield St Marys By-Election 16 July 1998
Party	Candidate	Votes	%	±%
Liberal Democrats		824	51.1	+23.7
Conservative		644	40.0	+14.5
Labour		142	8.8	+0.8
Majority		180	11.1	
Turnout		1,610	36.4	
Liberal Democrats gain from Independent		Swing		

Medstead By-Election 5 November 1998
Party	Candidate	Votes	%	±%
Liberal Democrats		415	56.5	+14.9
Conservative		399	39.2	−16.7
Labour		31	4.2	+4.2
Majority		138	17.3	
Turnout		734	46.6	
Liberal Democrats hold		Swing		

=== 1999-2003 ===
Hangers By-Election 10 June 1999
Party	Candidate	Votes	%	±%
Conservative		327	57.0	+57.0
Liberal Democrats		247	43.0	+8.5
Majority		80	14.0	
Turnout		574	14.0	
Conservative gain from Independent		Swing		

Petersfield St Peters By-Election 1 November 2001
Party	Candidate	Votes	%	±%
Liberal Democrats	Anne Claxton	535	53.1	+11.3
Conservative	Paul Molloy	403	40.0	−2.5
Labour	William Organ	69	6.9	−8.8
Majority		132	13.1	
Turnout		1,007	24.1	
Liberal Democrats hold		Swing		

=== 2003-2007 ===
Rowlands Castle By-Election 9 September 2004
Party	Candidate	Votes	%	±%
Liberal Democrats	Marjorie Harvey	597	58.3	−5.1
Conservative	Stephen Braden	427	41.7	+5.1
Majority		170	16.6	
Turnout		1,024	49.5	
Liberal Democrats hold		Swing		

Alton Westbrooke By-Election 5 May 2005
Party	Candidate	Votes	%	±%
Liberal Democrats	John Smith	1,002	77.9	
Labour	Barbara Burfoot	285	22.1	
Majority		717	55.8	
Turnout		1,287		
Liberal Democrats hold		Swing		

Whitehill Hogmoor By-Election 26 July 2005
Party	Candidate	Votes	%	±%
Liberal Democrats	Philip Drury	292	68.5	−4.4
Conservative	Barry Hope	134	31.5	+4.4
Majority		158	37.0	
Turnout		426	24.2	
Liberal Democrats hold		Swing		

Liss By-Election 15 September 2005
Party	Candidate	Votes	%	±%
Conservative	Gina Logan	672	53.6	−1.0
Liberal Democrats	Roger Mullenger	472	37.6	+6.1
Labour	Howard Linsley	110	8.8	−5.1
Majority		200	16.0	
Turnout		1,254	32.4	
Conservative hold		Swing		

Clanfield & Finchdean By-Election 27 April 2006
Party	Candidate	Votes	%	±%
Liberal Democrats	Samantha Payne	733	57.1	+3.5
Conservative	Kenneth Moon	550	42.9	−3.5
Majority		183	14.3	
Turnout		1,283	33.8	
Liberal Democrats hold		Swing		

Whitehill Deadwater By-Election 28 September 2006
Party	Candidate	Votes	%	±%
Liberal Democrats	Tony Muldoon	214	64.7	+3.7
Conservative	Colin Leach	93	28.1	−10.9
Labour	Catriona Mackenzie	24	7.3	+7.3
Majority		121	36.6	+14.6
Turnout		331	16.4	
Liberal Democrats hold		Swing		

=== 2007-2011 ===
Holybourne and Froyle By-Election 9 October 2008
Party	Candidate	Votes	%	±%
Conservative	Glynis Watts	424	54.6	−13.6
Liberal Democrats	Dean Phillips	352	45.4	+21.6
Majority		72	9.2	
Turnout		776	35.6	
Conservative hold		Swing		

=== 2011-2015 ===
Bramshott and Liphook By-Election 15 September 2011
Party	Candidate	Votes	%	±%
Conservative	Charles Mouland	796		
Conservative	Lynn Ashton	743		
Liberal Democrats	Michael Croucher	404		
Liberal Democrats	Evelyn Hope	371		
Labour	John Tough	183		
Green	Neville Taylor	126		
Labour	Frank Jones	117		
Turnout		2,740	21.3	
Conservative hold		Swing		
Conservative hold		Swing		

Horndean Downs By-Election 12 July 2012
Party	Candidate	Votes	%	±%
Conservative	Guy Shepherd	315	43.4	−21.1
Liberal Democrats	Terry Port	274	37.8	+13.6
Labour	Katie Green	73	10.1	−1.3
UKIP	David Alexander	63	8.7	+8.7
Majority		41	5.7	
Turnout		725		
Conservative hold		Swing		

Liss By-Election 2 May 2013
Party	Candidate	Votes	%	±%
Conservative	Richard Harris	593	43.6	−14.1
UKIP	Donald Jerrard	350	25.7	+25.7
Liberal Democrats	Roger Mullenger	224	16.5	−4.1
Labour	Keith Budden	193	14.2	−7.5
Majority		243	17.9	
Turnout		1,360		
Conservative hold		Swing		

Four Marks and Medstead By-Election 19 September 2013
Party	Candidate	Votes	%	±%
Conservative	Ingrid Thomas	749	58.1	−14.1
UKIP	Ruth Duffin	348	27.0	+27.0
Labour	Janice Treacher	119	9.2	+0.6
Green	Marjorie Pooley	73	5.7	+5.7
Majority		401	31.1	
Turnout		1,289		
Conservative hold		Swing		

Petersfield Bell Hill By-Election 12 March 2014
Party	Candidate	Votes	%	±%
Conservative	Peter Marshall	190	42.3	−14.9
UKIP	Peter Dimond	110	24.5	+24.5
Labour	Colin Brazier	75	16.7	−2.6
Liberal Democrats	Roger Mullenger	74	16.5	−7.0
Majority		80	17.8	
Turnout		449		
Conservative hold		Swing		

=== 2015-2019 ===
Clanfield and Finchdean By-Election 5 May 2016
Party	Candidate	Votes	%	±%
Conservative	Nigel Wren	765	51.8	−9.3
Liberal Democrats	Elaine Woodard	410	27.7	+5.1
UKIP	David Alexander	303	20.5	+20.5
Majority		355	21.3	
Turnout		1,478		
Conservative hold		Swing		

The Hangers and Forest By-Election 26 July 2016
Party	Candidate	Votes	%	±%
Conservative	Keith Budden	236	45.3	−23.7
Liberal Democrats	Roger Mullenger	227	43.6	+43.6
JAC	Don Jerrard	41	7.9	+7.9
Labour	Neil Owsnett	17	3.3	−9.6
Majority		9	1.7	
Turnout		521		
Conservative hold		Swing		

Petersfield Bell Hill By-Election 8 March 2018
Party	Candidate	Votes	%	±%
Independent	Jamie Matthews	178	32.6	+32.6
Liberal Democrats	David Podger	156	28.6	+14.6
Conservative	Clive Shore	145	26.6	−20.8
Labour	Steve Elder	56	10.3	−4.9
UKIP	Jim Makin	11	2.0	−10.2
Majority		22	4.0	
Turnout		546		
Independent gain from Conservative		Swing		

=== 2019-2023 ===
Bramshott and Liphook By-Election 6 May 2021
Party	Candidate	Votes	%	±%
Conservative	Nick Sear	1,470	56.5	−0.5
Liberal Democrats	Lynsey Conway	754	29.0	+29.0
Labour	John Tough	378	14.5	−4.7
Majority		716	27.5	
Turnout		2,602		
Conservative hold		Swing		

Grayshott By-Election 6 May 2021
Party	Candidate	Votes	%	±%
Conservative	Tom Hanrahan	453	54.6	−2.1
Liberal Democrats	David Jamieson	239	28.8	−2.0
Green	Alexandra Leaton	64	7.7	+7.7
Labour	Larisa Mendresse-Elder	55	6.6	+2.8
UKIP	Ted Wildey	19	2.3	−6.5
Majority		214	25.8	
Turnout		830		
Conservative hold		Swing		

Horndean Downs By-Election 30 September 2021
Party	Candidate	Votes	%	±%
Green	Blossom Gottlieb	320	49.2	+33.3
Conservative	Jonathan Whitfield	291	44.7	−8.0
Independent	David Alexander	40	6.1	−12.6
Majority		29	4.5	
Turnout		651		
Green gain from Conservative		Swing		

=== 2023-2027 ===
Four Marks and Medstead By-Election 15 February 2024
Party	Candidate	Votes	%	±%
Liberal Democrats	Roland Richardson	1,212	62.2	
Conservative	Kerry Southern-Reason	736	37.8	
Majority		476	24.4	
Turnout		1,948		
Liberal Democrats hold		Swing		

Four Marks and Medstead By-Election 21 August 2025
Party	Candidate	Votes	%	±%
Liberal Democrats	Lizzie Marshall	407	55.0	+1.7
Reform UK	Richard Moore	189	25.5	+25.5
Conservative	Brighton Gono	145	19.5	−9.9
Majority		218	29.5	
Turnout		744		
Liberal Democrats hold				
