= 2019 East Hampshire District Council election =

← 2015	2 May 2019	2023 →

All 43 council seats 22 seats needed for a majority

	First party	Second party
Party	Conservative	Liberal Democrats
Last election	42 seats, 61.0%	2 seats, 17.5%
Seats won	32	7
Seat change	▼10	▲5
Popular vote	16,462	9,772
Percentage	48.2%	28.1%
Swing	▼12.8%	▲10.6%
	Third party	Fourth party
Party	Labour	Independent
Last election	0 seats, 9.1%	0 seats, 10.4%
Seats won	2	2
Seat change	▲2	▲2
Popular vote	3,554	1,333
Percentage	10.4%	4.3%
Swing	▲1.3%	▲1.9%
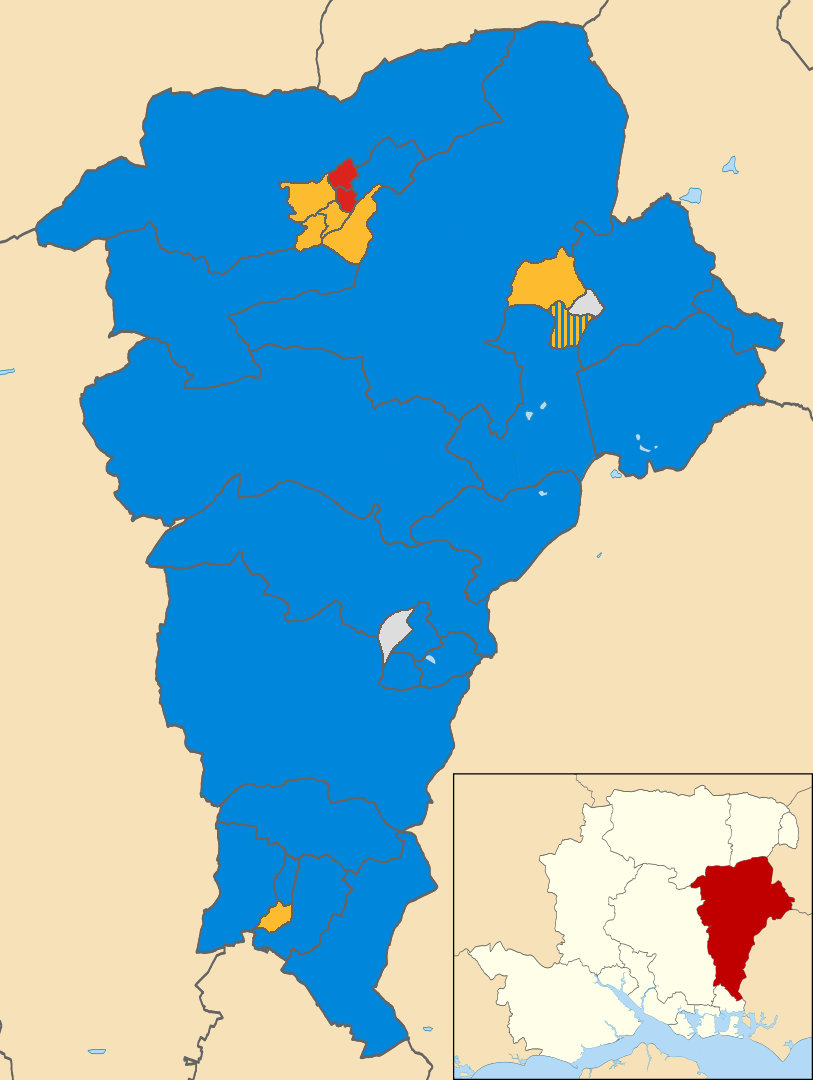
- Map of the results of the 2019 election, by ward.
Previous Largest Party before election
Conservative
Subsequent Largest Party
Conservative

The 2019 East Hampshire District Council election took place on 2 May 2019 to elect members of the East Hampshire District Council in England. It was held on the same day as other local elections. New ward boundaries were used, with some new wards created, with others having their boundaries amended. Wards with the same name but amended boundaries are noted. The number of councillors was reduced from 44 to 43.

The election saw the Conservatives lose 10 seats, with the Liberal Democrats (previously the only other party to hold seats in the council), Labour, and Independents gaining seats. The Liberal Democrats, forming the largest opposition, with seven seats in total, an increase of five, with four seats in Alton, two in Whitehill, and one in Murray. Labour won a further two seats, and two seats were returned to independent councillors.

== Summary ==
=== Election result ===
2019 East Hampshire District Council election
Party	Candidates	Seats	Gains	Losses	Net gain/loss	Seats %	Votes %	Votes	+/−
Conservative	43	32	0	10	▼10	74.4	46.2	16,462	–14.8
Liberal Democrats	27	7	5	0	▲5	16.3	27.4	9,772	+8.5
Labour	35	2	2	0	▲2	4.7	10.0	3,554	+1.3
Independent	4	2	2	0	▲2	4.7	3.7	1,333	+1.3
Green	10	0	0	0	Steady	0.0	9.9	3,544	+5.3
UKIP	6	0	0	0	Steady	0.0	2.1	732	–3.0
JAC	2	0	0	0	Steady	0.0	0.7	265	+0.3

== Results by ward ==
=== Alton Amery ===
Alton Amery (Note: New Ward Boundaries)
Party	Candidate	Votes	%	±%
Liberal Democrats	Steve Hunt	405	52.87	
Conservative	Danny Green	277	36.16	
Labour	Robert Peters	84	10.96	
Majority		128	16.71	
Turnout		766		
Liberal Democrats gain from Conservative		Swing		

=== Alton Ashdell ===
Alton Ashdell
Party	Candidate	Votes	%	±%
Liberal Democrats	Suzie Burns	426	54.82	
Conservative	Andrew Joy	297	38.22	
Labour	Jenny Abbott	54	6.94	
Majority		129	16.60	
Turnout		777		
Liberal Democrats gain from Conservative		Swing		

=== Alton Eastbrooke ===
Alton Eastbrooke
Party	Candidate	Votes	%	±%
Labour	Paula Langley	197	35.94	
Conservative	Dean Phillips	178	32.48	
Liberal Democrats	Steve Coatsworth	173	31.56	
Majority		19	3.46	
Turnout		548		
Labour gain from Conservative		Swing		

=== Alton Holybourne ===
Alton Holybourne
Party	Candidate	Votes	%	±%
Conservative	Graham Hill	353	47.00	
Liberal Democrats	Nicholas James	281	37.41	
Labour	Barbara Tansey	117	15.57	
Majority		72	9.58	
Turnout		751		
Conservative win (new seat)				

=== Alton Westbrooke ===
Alton Westbrooke
Party	Candidate	Votes	%	±%
Liberal Democrats	Richard Platt	359	47.05	
Conservative	Peter Hicks	286	37.48	
Labour	Ian Abbott	118	15.46	
Majority		73	9.56	
Turnout		763		
Liberal Democrats gain from Conservative		Swing		

=== Alton Whitedown ===
Alton Whitedown
Party	Candidate	Votes	%	±%
Liberal Democrats	Ginny Boxall	643	68.91	
Conservative	Jane Costigan	234	25.08	
Labour	Janice Treacher	56	6.00	
Majority		409	43.83	
Turnout		933		
Liberal Democrats gain from Conservative		Swing		

=== Alton Wooteys ===
Alton Wooteys
Party	Candidate	Votes	%	±%
Labour	Stephen Dolan	369	51.60	
Conservative	David Orme	346	48.39	
Majority		23	3.21	
Turnout		715		
Labour gain from Conservative		Swing		

=== Bentworth & Froyle ===
Bentworth & Froyle
Party	Candidate	Votes	%	±%
Conservative	Tony Costigan	652	76.34	
Labour	Jenniann Davies	202	23.65	
Majority		450	52.69	
Turnout		854		
Conservative win (new seat)				

=== Binsted, Bentley & Selborne ===
Binsted, Bentley & Selborne (2)
Party	Candidate	Votes	%	±%
Conservative	David Ashcroft	1,029	58.10	
Conservative	Ken Carter	889	50.20	
Liberal Democrats	Lynne Ravenscroft	839	47.37	
Labour	Jane-Frances Price	266	15.02	
Labour	Barbara Burfoot	192	10.84	
Majority		190	8.90	
Turnout		2134		
Conservative win (new seat)				
Conservative win (new seat)				

=== Bramshott & Liphook ===
Bramshott and Liphook (3)
Party	Candidate	Votes	%	±%
Conservative	Bill Mouland	1,421	61.97	
Conservative	Angela Glass	1,372	59.83	
Conservative	Rebecca Standish	1,348	58.79	
Labour	John Tough	479	20.89	
Labour	Matt Twist	475	20.72	
Labour	Neil Niblock	394	17.18	
UKIP	Susan Bentley	327	14.26	
JAC	Don Jerrard	265	11.56	
JAC	Eddie Trotter	236	10.29	
Majority		942	37.80	
Turnout		2492		
Conservative hold		Swing		
Conservative hold		Swing		
Conservative hold		Swing		

=== Buriton & East Meon ===
Buriton & East Meon
Party	Candidate	Votes	%	±%
Conservative	Robert Mocatta	459	54.12	
Green	Pippa Lee	310	36.55	
Labour	Greg Ford	79	9.31	
Majority		149	37.80	
Turnout		848		
Conservative win (new seat)				

=== Clanfield ===
Clanfield (2)
Party	Candidate	Votes	%	±%
Conservative	Arthur Agate	715	53.00	
Conservative	Ken Moon	711	52.71	
Liberal Democrats	Richard Robinson	611	45.29	
Majority		104	7.84	
Turnout		1326		
Conservative win (new seat)				
Conservative win (new seat)				

=== Four Marks & Medstead ===
Four Marks & Medstead (3)
Party	Candidate	Votes	%	±%
Conservative	Ingrid Catherine	1,439	62.46	
Conservative	Jonathan May	1,281	55.60	
Conservative	Diana Tennyson	1,263	54.82	
Liberal Democrats	Ralph Gwilt	819	35.55	
Green	Benjamin Malam	671	29.12	
Labour	Julie Nicholson	222	9.64	
Labour	Don Hammond	196	8.51	
Labour	Ivan Mowse	145	6.29	
Majority		620	7.84	
Turnout		3151		
Conservative win (new seat)				
Conservative win (new seat)				
Conservative win (new seat)				

=== Froxfield, Sheet & Steep ===
Froxfield, Sheet & Steep
Party	Candidate	Votes	%	±%
Conservative	Nick Drew	567	55.04	
Liberal Democrats	Louise Bevan	401	38.93	
Labour	Phil Cottrell	62	6.01	
Majority		166	16.11	
Turnout		1030		
Conservative win (new seat)				

=== Grayshott ===
Grayshott
Party	Candidate	Votes	%	±%
Conservative	Ferris Cowper	451	56.65	
Liberal Democrats	David Jamieson	245	30.77	
UKIP	Ted Wildey	70	8.79	
Labour	Larisa Mendresse-Elder	30	3.76	
Majority		206	25.87	
Turnout		796		
Conservative hold		Swing		

=== Headley ===
Headley (2)
Party	Candidate	Votes	%	±%
Conservative	Anthony Williams	978	60.48	
Conservative	Richard Millard	877	54.24	
Liberal Democrats	Lesley Shepherd	520	32.16	
Liberal Democrats	Anna Lubelska	513	31.73	
Labour	Julia Deacon	112	6.93	
Labour	Francis Macnamara	86	5.32	
Majority		458	28.44	
Turnout		1610		
Conservative hold		Swing		
Conservative hold		Swing		

=== Horndean Catherington ===
Horndean Catherington (1 seat)
Party	Candidate	Votes	%	±%
Conservative	Sara Schillemore	Unopposed	N/A	
Turnout		N/A	N/A	
Conservative hold		Swing		

=== Horndean Downs ===
Horndean Downs
Party	Candidate	Votes	%	±%
Conservative	Tony Denton	425	52.66	
Green	Laurent Coffre	128	15.86	
Independent	David Alexadner	151	18.71	
Liberal Democrats	Ian Maiden	103	12.76	
Majority		297	36.80	
Turnout		807		
Conservative hold		Swing		

=== Horndean Kings & Blendworth ===
Horndean Kings & Blendworth
Party	Candidate	Votes	%	±%
Conservative	David Evans	703	59.32	
Conservative	Christopher Hatter	629	53.08	
Liberal Democrats	John Smart	472	39.83	
Green	Mike Sievwright	378	31.90	
Majority		231	14.87	
Turnout		1,553		
Conservative win (new seat)				
Conservative win (new seat)				

=== Horndean Murray ===
Horndean Murray
Party	Candidate	Votes	%	±%
Liberal Democrats	Elaine Woodard	326	53.26	
Conservative	Lynn Evans	286	46.73	
Majority		40	6.53	
Turnout		612		
Liberal Democrats gain from Conservative		Swing		

=== Lindford ===
Lindford
Party	Candidate	Votes	%	±%
Independent	Neville Taylor	371	46.84	
Conservative	Derek Barr	250	31.56	
Liberal Democrats	Frank Levene	79	9.97	
UKIP	Geoffrey Bentley	58	7.32	
Labour	Simon Banks van Zyl	34	4.29	
Majority		121	15.27	
Turnout		792		
Independent win (new seat)				

=== Liss ===
Liss (2)
Party	Candidate	Votes	%	±%
Conservative	Keith Budden	1,009	53.19	
Conservative	Russell Oppenheimer	871	45.91	
Liberal Democrats	Roger Mullenger	600	31.63	
Green	Ian James	594	31.31	
Labour	Sheila Baldwin	274	14.44	
Labour	Howard Linsley	238	12.55	
Majority		409	16.51	
Turnout		2477		
Conservative hold		Swing		

=== Petersfield Bell Hill ===
Petersfield Bell Hill
Party	Candidate	Votes	%	±%
Independent	Jamie Matthews	467	51.37	
Conservative	Peter Doyle	179	19.69	
Green	John Hilton	140	15.40	
Labour	Steve Elder	68	7.48	
UKIP	Jim Makin	55	6.05	
Majority		288	31.68	
Turnout		909		
Independent win (new seat)				

=== Petersfield Causeway ===
Petersfield Causeway
Party	Candidate	Votes	%	±%
Conservative	Ben Bentley	281	43.49	
Liberal Democrats	John Hutchinson	273	42.26	
Labour	Colin Brazier	92	14.24	
Majority		8	1.23	
Turnout		646		
Conservative hold		Swing		

=== Petersfield Heath ===
Petersfield Heath
Party	Candidate	Votes	%	±%
Conservative	Julie Butler	467	49.47	
Liberal Democrats	Angus Robinson	196	20.76	
Green	Zoe Parker	147	15.57	
Labour	Bill Organ	71	7.52	
UKIP	Malcom Bint	63	6.67	
Majority		271	28.70	
Turnout		944		
Conservative hold		Swing		

=== Petersfield St Peter's ===
Petersfield St Peters (2)
Party	Candidate	Votes	%	±%
Conservative	Matthew Gass	611	30.58	
Conservative	David McKinney	598	29.93	
Liberal Democrats	David Podger	558	27.93	
Liberal Democrats	Phil Shaw	545	27.28	
Green	John Palmer	525	26.28	
Independent	Jonathan Walker	438	21.92	
Labour	Sarah Morris	173	8.66	
UKIP	Ben James	159	7.96	
Labour	Jeremy Abraham	143	7.16	
Majority		53	2.17	
Turnout		2,434		
Conservative hold		Swing		
Conservative hold		Swing		

=== Ropley, Hawkley & Hangers ===
Ropley, Hawkley & Hangers
Party	Candidate	Votes	%	±%
Conservative	Charles Louisson	710	68.26	
Green	Marie-Marthe Gervais	286	27.50	
Labour	Stephen Whitehead	44	4.23	
Majority		424	40.76	
Turnout		1040		
Conservative win (new seat)				

=== Rowlands Castle ===
Rowlands Castle
Party	Candidate	Votes	%	±%
Conservative	Malcom Johnson	534	59.39	
Green	Peter Bisset	365	40.60	
Majority		169	18.79	
Turnout		899		
Conservative hold		Swing		

=== Whitehill Chase ===
Whitehill Chase (2)
Party	Candidate	Votes	%	±%
Conservative	Sally Pond	552	44.30	
Liberal Democrats	Paul Wigman	543	43.58	
Conservative	Anthony Muldoon	512	41.09	
Liberal Democrats	Thomas Coleman	428	34.35	
Labour	Alina Vraible	176	14.13	
Labour	David Ilsley	162	13.00	
Turnout		1,271		
Conservative hold		Swing		
Liberal Democrats win (new seat)				

=== Whitehill Hogmoor & Greatham ===
Whitehill Hogmoor & Greatham (2)
Party	Candidate	Votes	%	±%
Conservative	Adam Carew	689	48.49	
Conservative	Philip Davies	589	41.45	
Liberal Democrats	Antony Gray	562	39.55	
Liberal Democrats	Michael Croucher	520	36.59	
Labour	Mercy Bolus	128	9.01	
Labour	Moira Johnson	120	8.44	
Majority		127	9.20	
Turnout		1379		
Conservative win (new seat)				
Conservative win (new seat)				

=== Whitehill Pinewood ===
Whitehill Pinewood
Party	Candidate	Votes	%	±%
Liberal Democrats	Trevor Maroney	149	45.15	
Conservative	Neil Ward	134	40.60	
Labour	Tom Barnett	47	14.24	
Majority		15	4.54	
Turnout		330		
Liberal Democrats gain from Conservative		Swing		

== 2019–2023 by-elections ==
=== Bramshott & Liphook ===
Bramshott and Liphook by-election, 6 May 2021
Party	Candidate	Votes	%	±%
Conservative	Nicholas Sear	1,470	56.5	−3.4
Liberal Democrats	Lynsey Conway	754	29.0	New
Labour	John Tough	378	14.5	−5.1
Majority		716	27.5	−10.3
Turnout		2602		
Conservative hold		Swing	-5.2	

=== Grayshott ===
Grayshott by-election, 6 May 2021
Party	Candidate	Votes	%	±%
Conservative	Thomas Hanrahan	453	54.6	−2.1
Liberal Democrats	David Jamieson	239	28.9	−1.9
Green	Alexandra Leaton	64	7.7	New
Labour	Larisa Mendresse-Elder	55	6.6	+2.8
UKIP	Ted Wildey	19	2.3	−6.5
Majority		214	25.7	−0.2
Turnout		830		
Conservative hold		Swing	-0.1	

=== Horndean Downs ===
Horndean Downs by-election, 30 September 2021
Party	Candidate	Votes	%	±%
Green	Blossom Gottlieb	320	49.2	+33.3
Conservative	Jonathan Whitfield	291	44.7	−8.0
Independent	David Alexander	40	6.1	−12.6
Majority		29	4.5	N/A
Turnout		651	26.8	
Green gain from Conservative		Swing	▲20.7	
