= 2015 East Hampshire District Council election =

2015 UK local government election

← 2011	7 May 2015	2019 →

All 44 council seats 23 seats needed for a majority

	Second party	Third party
Party	Conservative	Liberal Democrats
Last election	39 seats, 61.0%	5 seats, 26.7%
Seats won	42	2
Seat change	▲3	▼3
Popular vote	34,117	9772
Percentage	61.0%	17.5%
Swing	0.0%	▼9.2%
- Map of the results of the 2015 election, by ward.
Previous Largest Party before election
Conservative
Subsequent Largest Party
Conservative

The 2015 East Hampshire District Council election took place on 7 May 2015 to elect members of the East Hampshire District Council in England. It was held on the same day as other local elections. The election saw the Conservatives maintain their majority, whilst the Liberal Democrats, the only other party to hold representation on the council, lost three seats to the Conservatives, all in Whitehill. Three Conservatives and both Liberal Democrats were unopposed in the election, and thus were returned automatically.

East Hampshire local election result 2011
Party	Seats	Gains	Losses	Net gain/loss	Seats %	Votes %	Votes	+/−
Conservative	42	3	0	▲3		61.0	34,117	0.0
Liberal Democrats	2	0	3	▼3		17.5	9,772	▼9.2
Labour	0	0	0	0		9.1	5,096	▼1.7
UKIP	0	0	0	0		5.1	2,870	▲5.1
Green	0	0	0	0		4.6	2,554	▲4.6
Independent	0	0	0	0		2.4	1,333	▲1.5
JAC	0	0	0	0		0.4	227	▼0.1

== Ward Results ==
=== Alton Amery ===
Alton Amery
Party	Candidate	Votes	%	±%
Conservative	Robert Saunders	631	48.0	
Liberal Democrats	Allan Chick	479	36.4	
Labour	Barbara Burfoot	205	15.6	
Majority		152		
Turnout		1315		
Conservative hold		Swing		

=== Alton Ashdell ===
Alton Ashdell
Party	Candidate	Votes	%	±%
Conservative	Andrew Joy	930	64.7	
Liberal Democrats	Sharon Cullen	330	23.0	
Labour	Peter Treacher	177	12.3	
Majority		259		
Turnout		1437		
Conservative hold		Swing		

=== Alton Eastbrooke ===
Alton Eastbrooke
Party	Candidate	Votes	%	±%
Conservative	Dean Phillips	574	51.3	
Liberal Democrats	Pam Bradford	315	28.2	
Labour	Janice Treacher	230	20.6	
Majority		259		
Turnout		1119		
Conservative hold		Swing		

=== Alton Westbrooke ===
Alton Westbrooke
Party	Candidate	Votes	%	±%
Conservative	Edward Brandt	522	36.3	
UKIP	Bill Blake	242	16.8	
Liberal Democrats	Christopher Lawrence	186	12.9	
Independent	Nicky Branch	175	12.2	
Green	Eleanor Hill	162	11.3	
Labour	Roget Godber	150	10.4	
Turnout				
Conservative hold		Swing		

=== Alton Whitedown ===
Alton Whitedown
Party	Candidate	Votes	%	±%
Conservative	Graham Hill	820	47.1	
Liberal Democrats	Pam Jones	687	39.5	
Labour	Eamonn Griffin	233	13.4	
Majority		133		
Turnout		1,509		
Conservative hold		Swing		

=== Alton Wooteys ===
Alton Wooteys
Party	Candidate	Votes	%	±%
Conservative	David Orme	585	51.2	
Liberal Democrats	John Pritchard	309	27.1	
Labour	Don Hammond	248	21.7	
Majority		276		
Turnout		1,142		
Conservative hold		Swing		

=== Binsted and Bentley ===
Binsted and Bentley
Party	Candidate	Votes	%	±%
Conservative	Ken Carter	unopposed		
Conservative hold		Swing		

=== Bramshott and Liphook ===
Bramshott and Liphook (3)
Party	Candidate	Votes	%	±%
Conservative	Angela Glass	2,617	55.45	
Conservative	Bill Mouland	2,502		
Conservative	Rebecca Standish	2,361		
Liberal Democrats	Jeanette Kirby	1,293	27.4	
Liberal Democrats	Michael Croucher	1,251		
Liberal Democrats	Trevor Maroney	1,137		
Labour	John Tough	583	12.4	
Labour	Dennis Slark	527		
Labour	Ann Saunders	417		
JAC	Don Jerrard	227	4.8	
Conservative hold		Swing		
Conservative hold		Swing		
Conservative hold		Swing		

=== Clanfield and Finchdean ===
Clanfield and Finchdean (2)
Party	Candidate	Votes	%	±%
Conservative	Ken Moon	1675	61.1	
Conservative	Tony Denton	1,582		
Liberal Democrats	Judith Rodgers	620	22.6	
Liberal Democrats	Jan Mallett	449		
Labour	Michael Burgess	447	16.3	
Labour	Carole Parsons	342		
Conservative hold		Swing		
Conservative hold		Swing		

=== Downland ===
Downland
Party	Candidate	Votes	%	±%
Conservative	Tony Costigan	unopposed		
Conservative hold		Swing		

=== East Meon ===
East Meon
Party	Candidate	Votes	%	±%
Conservative	Robert Mocatta	817	59.0	
Green	Pippa Lee	256	18.5	
Liberal Democrats	Michael Woodard	156	11.3	
Labour	John Till	155	11.2	
Turnout				
Conservative hold		Swing		

=== Four Marks and Medstead ===
Four Marks and Medstead (2)
Party	Candidate	Votes	%	±%
Conservative	Deborah Brooks Jackson	3314	87.0	
Conservative	Ingrid Thompson	3053		
Labour	Derek Thompson	497	13.0	
Labour	Frances Thompson	475		
Conservative hold		Swing		
Conservative hold		Swing		

=== Froxfield and Steep ===
Froxfield and Steep
Party	Candidate	Votes	%	±%
Conservative	Nick Drew	1208	87.5	
UKIP	Jim Makin	173	12.5	
Majority		1035		
Turnout		1381		
Conservative hold		Swing		

=== Grayshott ===
Grayshott
Party	Candidate	Votes	%	±%
Conservative	Ferris Cowper	1094	77.8	
Liberal Democrats	David Jamieson	313	22.2	
Majority		781		
Turnout		1094		
Conservative hold		Swing		

=== The Hangers and Forest ===
The Hangers and Forest
Party	Candidate	Votes	%	±%
Conservative	Judy Onslow	983	69.0	
Independent	Carole Rudd	257	18.0	
Labour	Neil Owsnett	184	12.9	
Majority		799		
Turnout		1424		
Conservative hold		Swing		

=== Headley ===
Headley (2)
Party	Candidate	Votes	%	±%
Conservative	Richard Millard	1894	60.9	
Conservative	Anthony Williams	1568		
UKIP	Peter Baillie	632	20.3	
Liberal Democrats	Gary Hopwood	584	18.8	
Liberal Democrats	Moira Watkinson	506		
UKIP	Ted Wildey	321		
Conservative hold		Swing		
Conservative hold		Swing		

=== Holybourne and Froyle ===
Holybourne and Froyle
Party	Candidate	Votes	%	±%
Conservative	Glynis Watts	1375	73.2	
Green	Penney Hames	503	26.8	
Majority		872		
Turnout		1878		
Conservative hold		Swing		

=== Horndean Catherington and Lovedean ===
Hordean Catherington and Lovedean
Party	Candidate	Votes	%	±%
Conservative	Sara Schillemore	1006	77.4	
Liberal Democrats	Shirley Port	293	22.6	
Majority		713		
Turnout		1299		
Conservative hold		Swing		

=== Horndean Downs ===
Horndean Downs
Party	Candidate	Votes	%	±%
Conservative	Guy Shepherd	967	70.2	
UKIP	David Alexander	212	15.4	
Labour	Margaret Hewitt-Pain	100	7.3	
Liberal Democrats	Richard Judd	98	7.1	
Turnout		1377		
Conservative hold		Swing		

=== Horndean Hazleton and Blendworth ===
Hordean Hazleton and Blendworth
Party	Candidate	Votes	%	±%
Conservative	Elaine Tickell	1016	72.6	
Liberal Democrats	Ian Maiden	383	27.4	
Majority		633		
Turnout		1399		
Conservative hold		Swing		

=== Horndean Kings ===
Horndean Kings
Party	Candidate	Votes	%	±%
Conservative	David Evans	1027	59.3	
Liberal Democrats	Terry Port	395	22.8	
UKIP	Joanne Murray	311	17.9	
Turnout		1733		
Conservative hold		Swing		

=== Horndean Murray ===
Horndean Murray
Party	Candidate	Votes	%	±%
Conservative	Lynn Evans	869	67.3	
Liberal Democrats	Elaine Woodard	322	24.9	
Labour	Katie Green	100	7.7	
Turnout		1291		
Conservative hold		Swing		

=== Lindford ===
Lindford
Party	Candidate	Votes	%	±%
Conservative	Yvonne Parker-Smith	1052	77.8	
Liberal Democrats	Bill Melly	301	22.2	
Majority		385	45.9	−3.4
Turnout		839	39.5	+6.0
Conservative hold		Swing		

=== Liss ===
Liss (2)
Party	Candidate	Votes	%	±%
Conservative	Mike Kendall	1,444	40.3	
Conservative	Laetitia Pienaar	1,208		
Independent	Keith Budden	517	14.4	
UKIP	Rob Evans	450	12.6	
Liberal Democrats	Roger Mullenger	424	11.8	
Green	Steve Bartholomew	383	10.7	
Labour	Francis Macnamara	364	10.2	
Labour	Howard Linsley	348		
Labour	Adam Harper	187		
Conservative hold		Swing		
Conservative hold		Swing		

=== Petersfield Bell Hill ===
Petersfield Bell Hill
Party	Candidate	Votes	%	±%
Conservative	Thomas Spencer	612	47.4	
Labour	Beth Vaughan	196	15.2	
Liberal Democrats	Caspian Conran	181	14.0	
UKIP	Deena Adnath-Evans	157	12.2	
Green	Anna Glanville-Hearson	144	11.2	
Turnout				
Conservative hold		Swing		

=== Petersfield Causeway ===
Petersfield Causeway
Party	Candidate	Votes	%	±%
Conservative	Ben Bentley	709	52.3	
Green	Liz Bisset	236	17.4	
Liberal Democrats	Cicely Robinson	230	17.0	
Labour	Colin Braxier	180	13.3	
Turnout				
Conservative hold		Swing		

=== Petersfield Heath ===
Petersfield Heath
Party	Candidate	Votes	%	±%
Conservative	Julie Butler	641	55.6	
Green	Peter Bisset	187	16.2	
Liberal Democrats	Peter Turner	171	14.8	
UKIP	Rupert Sayer	153	13.3	
Turnout				
Conservative hold		Swing		

=== Petersfield Rother ===
Petersfield Rother
Party	Candidate	Votes	%	±%
Conservative	Bob Ayer	927	60.1	
Labour	Bill Organ	247	24.7	
Green	Philip Humphries	220	14.3	
UKIP	Malcomn Bint	148	9.6	
Turnout				
Conservative hold		Swing		

=== Petersfield St Marys ===
Petersfield St Marys
Party	Candidate	Votes	%	±%
Conservative	Nick Noble	941	58.8	
Green	Sandy Noble	293	18.3	
Labour	Simon Easton	222	13.9	
UKIP	Guy Stacpoole	143	8.9	
Turnout				
Conservative hold		Swing		

=== Petersfield St Peters ===
Petersfield St Peters
Party	Candidate	Votes	%	±%
Conservative	James Abdey	578	43.8	
Liberal Democrats	Louise Bevan	255	19.3	
Green	Lucy Vignola	170	12.9	
Labour	Tony Watson	165	12.5	
UKIP	Peter Dimon	153	11.6	
Turnout				
Conservative hold		Swing		

=== Ropley and Tisted ===
Ropley and Tisted
Party	Candidate	Votes	%	±%
Conservative	Charles Louisson	unopposed		
Conservative hold		Swing		

=== Rowlands Castle ===
Rowlands Castle
Party	Candidate	Votes	%	±%
Conservative	Malcom Johnson	1017	63.3	
Liberal Democrats	Catherine Billam	421	26.2	
Labour	Greg Beckett-Leonard	168	10.5	
Turnout				
Conservative hold		Swing		

=== Selborne ===
Selborne
Party	Candidate	Votes	%	±%
Conservative	David Ashcroft	682	47.5	
Independent	Terry Cartwright	384	26.8	
Liberal Democrats	Lynne Ravenscroft	369	25.7	
Turnout				
Conservative hold		Swing		

=== Whitehill Chase ===
Whitehill Chase
Party	Candidate	Votes	%	±%
Conservative	Sally Pond	unopposed		
Conservative hold		Swing		

=== Whitehill Deadwater ===
Whitehill Deadwater
Party	Candidate	Votes	%	±%
Conservative	Tony Muldoon	429	40.4	
UKIP	Rigby Andrews	277	26.1	
Liberal Democrats	Andrew Tree	229	21.6	
Labour	Kevin Upton	127	12.0	
Majority				
Turnout				
Conservative gain from Liberal Democrats		Swing		

=== Whitehill Hogmoor ===
Whitehill Hogmoor
Party	Candidate	Votes	%	±%
Conservative	Mervyn Roger-Smith	531	50.0	
UKIP	Trevor Edwards	272	25.6	
Liberal Democrats	Zoya Faddy	258	24.3	
Majority				
Turnout				
Conservative gain from Liberal Democrats		Swing		

=== Whitehill Pinewood ===
Whitehill Pinewood
Party	Candidate	Votes	%	±%
Conservative	Alan Waterhouse	unopposed		
Conservative hold		Swing		

=== Whitehill Walldown ===
Whitehill Walldown
Party	Candidate	Votes	%	±%
Conservative	Adam Carew	630	57.4	
UKIP	Charlotte Andrews	179	16.3	
Liberal Democrats	Justine Henson	170	15.5	
Labour	Stuart Bolus	118	10.8	
Majority				
Turnout				
Conservative gain from Liberal Democrats		Swing		
