= 2003 East Hampshire District Council election =

2003 UK local government election

← 1999	1 May 2003	2007 →

All 44 seats to East Hampshire District Council 23 seats needed for a majority
	First party	Second party
Party	Conservative	Liberal Democrats
Seats won	26	18
Popular vote	18,866	14,450
Percentage	53.5%	41.0%
Council control before election
Conservative Party
Council control after election
Conservative Party

The 2003 East Hampshire District Council election took place on 1 May 2003 to elect members of East Hampshire District Council in Hampshire England. The whole council was up for election with boundary changes since the last election in 1999 increasing the number of seats by 2. The Conservative Party stayed in overall control of the council.

== Election result ==
East Hampshire local election result 2003
Party	Seats	Gains	Losses	Net gain/loss	Seats %	Votes %	Votes	+/−
Conservative	26			+4	59.1	53.5	18,866	
Liberal Democrats	18			+1	40.9	41.0	14,450	
Labour	0			0	0.0	4.4	1,537	
Independent	0			-3	0.0	0.8	273	
Green	0			0	0.0	0.3	114	

3 Conservative and 1 Liberal Democrat candidates were unopposed at the election.

== Ward results ==
=== Alton Amery ===
Alton Amery
Party	Candidate	Votes	%	±%
Liberal Democrats	Anthony Ludlow	333	56.6	
Conservative	Camilla Boreham	161	27.4	
Labour	Roger Godber	94	16.0	
Majority		172	29.3	
Turnout		588	31.1	

=== Alton Ashdell ===
Alton Ashdell
Party	Candidate	Votes	%	±%
Conservative	Robert Chilton	351	52.9	
Liberal Democrats	James McKell	312	47.1	
Majority		39	5.9	
Turnout		663	38.0	

=== Alton Eastbrooke ===
Alton Eastbrooke
Party	Candidate	Votes	%	±%
Liberal Democrats	Pamela Bradford	289	58.4	
Conservative	Christopher Butler	122	24.6	
Labour	Janice Treacher	84	17.0	
Majority		167	33.7	
Turnout		495	24.4	

=== Alton Westbrooke ===
Alton Westbrooke
Party	Candidate	Votes	%	±%
Liberal Democrats	Robert Booker	449	70.2	
Conservative	Michael Baker	191	29.8	
Majority		258	40.3	
Turnout		640	30.5	

=== Alton Whitedown ===
Alton Whitedown
Party	Candidate	Votes	%	±%
Liberal Democrats	Allan Chick	397	50.9	
Conservative	Charles Glasgow	383	49.1	
Majority		14	1.8	
Turnout		780	41.6	

=== Alton Wooteys ===
Alton Wooteys
Party	Candidate	Votes	%	±%
Liberal Democrats	Jeremy Janes	257	52.9	
Conservative	Christopher Jones	121	24.9	
Labour	Barbara Burfoot	108	22.2	
Majority		136	28.0	
Turnout		486	27.1	

=== Binstead and Bentley ===
Binstead and Bentley
Party	Candidate	Votes	%	±%
Conservative	Brian Dickinson	unopposed		

=== Bramshott and Liphook ===
Bramshott and Liphook (3)
Party	Candidate	Votes	%	±%
Conservative	Anna James	1,130		
Conservative	Simon James	1,110		
Conservative	Evelyn Hope	1,017		
Liberal Democrats	Patricia Clarke	594		
Liberal Democrats	James Walters	587		
Liberal Democrats	Mary Walters	492		
Labour	Peter Dare	197		
Independent	Frederick Dawkins	141		
Turnout		5,268	28.1	

=== Clanfield and Finchdean ===
Clanfield and Finchdean (2)
Party	Candidate	Votes	%	±%
Liberal Democrats	Elizabeth Murray	700	34.9	
Liberal Democrats	Peter Rodgers	700	34.9	
Conservative	Kenneth Moon	605	30.2	
Turnout		2,005	31.9	

=== Downland ===
Downland
Party	Candidate	Votes	%	±%
Conservative	Patrick Burridge	532	71.5	
Liberal Democrats	Atul Patel	212	28.5	
Majority		320	43.0	
Turnout		744	40.1	

=== East Meon ===
East Meon
Party	Candidate	Votes	%	±%
Conservative	Marjorie Day	unopposed		

=== Four Marks and Medstead ===
Four Marks and Medstead (2)
Party	Candidate	Votes	%	±%
Conservative	Maurice Johnson	1,013		
Conservative	Patricia Seward	962		
Liberal Democrats	Brian Timms	952		
Liberal Democrats	David Harrison	749		
Labour	Peter Treacher	129		
Turnout		3,805	45.0	

=== Froxfield and Steep ===
Froxfield and Steep
Party	Candidate	Votes	%	±%
Conservative	Jennifer Gray	503	63.8	
Liberal Democrats	Albert Perry	285	36.2	
Majority		218	27.7	
Turnout		788	41.2	

=== Grayshott ===
Grayshott
Party	Candidate	Votes	%	±%
Conservative	Ferris Cowper	647	85.0	
Green	Clive Albone	114	15.0	
Majority		533	70.0	
Turnout		761	39.5	

=== Headley ===
Headley (2)
Party	Candidate	Votes	%	±%
Conservative	Geoffrey Whittle	992		
Conservative	Anthony Williams	970		
Liberal Democrats	Sheila Drury	342		
Liberal Democrats	Moira Watkinson	292		
Labour	Mark Walsh	133		
Turnout		2,729	31.0	

=== Holybourne and Froyle ===
Holybourne and Froyle
Party	Candidate	Votes	%	±%
Conservative	David O'Donnell	511	54.9	
Liberal Democrats	Robert Saunders	211	22.7	
Independent	Brian Nonhebel	132	14.2	
Labour	Donald Hammond	76	8.2	
Majority		300	32.3	
Turnout		930	41.8	

=== Horndean Catherington & Lovedean ===
Horndean Catherington & Lovedean
Party	Candidate	Votes	%	±%
Conservative	Sara Schillemore	356	57.3	
Liberal Democrats	Alan Ramsay	265	42.7	
Majority		91	14.7	
Turnout		621	33.6	

=== Horndean Downs ===
Horndean Downs
Party	Candidate	Votes	%	±%
Liberal Democrats	Thomas Costello	454	66.9	
Conservative	John Munro	225	33.1	
Majority		229	33.7	
Turnout		679	34.5	

=== Horndean Hazleton & Blendworth ===
Horndean Hazleton & Blendworth
Party	Candidate	Votes	%	±%
Conservative	Dorothy Denston	432	73.6	
Liberal Democrats	Elaine Woodard	155	26.4	
Majority		277	47.2	
Turnout		587	29.9	

=== Hordean Kings ===
Horndean Kings
Party	Candidate	Votes	%	±%
Liberal Democrats	Kenneth Graham	unopposed		

=== Horndean Murray ===
Horndean Murray
Party	Candidate	Votes	%	±%
Liberal Democrats	Michael Ashton	345	67.6	
Conservative	Hilary Munro	165	32.4	
Majority		180	35.3	
Turnout		510	27.0	

=== Lindford ===
Lindford
Party	Candidate	Votes	%	±%
Conservative	Yvonne Parker Smith	349	68.2	
Liberal Democrats	Anthony Muldoon	163	31.8	
Majority		186	36.3	
Turnout		512	29.3	

=== Liss ===
Liss (2)
Party	Candidate	Votes	%	±%
Conservative	Elizabeth Cartwright	1,114		
Conservative	David Onslow	802		
Liberal Democrats	Roger Mullenger	644		
Labour	Howard Linsley	284		
Turnout		2,844	38.0	

=== Petersfield Bell Hill ===
Petersfield Bell Hill
Party	Candidate	Votes	%	±%
Conservative	Guy Stacpoole	250	44.4	
Liberal Democrats	Penelope Wright	210	37.3	
Labour	Alan Stephens	103	18.3	
Majority		40	7.1	
Turnout		563	31.7	

=== Petersfield Causeway ===
Petersfield Causeway
Party	Candidate	Votes	%	±%
Liberal Democrats	Anne Claxton	342	50.0	
Conservative	Kerry Dedman	272	39.8	
Labour	William Organ	70	10.2	
Majority		70	10.2	
Turnout		684	37.1	

=== Petersfield Heath ===
Petersfield Heath
Party	Candidate	Votes	%	±%
Conservative	Brian Dutton	346	55.6	
Liberal Democrats	Phillip Humphries	276	44.4	
Majority		70	11.3	
Turnout		622	36.9	

=== Petersfield Rother ===
Petersfield Rother
Party	Candidate	Votes	%	±%
Conservative	Robert Ayer	539	62.3	
Liberal Democrats	Karen Bradbury	235	27.2	
Labour	Maureen Stephens	91	10.5	
Majority		304	35.1	
Turnout		865	48.1	

=== Petersfield St. Mary's ===
Petersfield St. Marys
Party	Candidate	Votes	%	±%
Conservative	Andrew Pattie	500	74.9	
Labour	Christine Straw	168	25.1	
Majority		332	49.7	
Turnout		668	43.0	

=== Petersfield St. Peter's ===
Petersfield St. Peters
Party	Candidate	Votes	%	±%
Conservative	Hilary Ayer	373	64.8	
Liberal Democrats	David Jamieson	203	35.2	
Majority		170	29.5	
Turnout		576	32.2	

=== Rowlands Castle ===
Rowlands Castle
Party	Candidate	Votes	%	±%
Liberal Democrats	David Clegg	544	63.4	
Conservative	William Johnston	314	36.6	
Majority		230	26.8	
Turnout		858	41.6	

=== Ropley and Tisted ===
Ropley and Tisted
Party	Candidate	Votes	%	±%
Liberal Democrats	Christopher Graham	506	51.4	
Conservative	Andrew Brown	479	48.6	
Majority		27	2.7	
Turnout		985	58.6	

=== Selborne ===
Selborne
Party	Candidate	Votes	%	±%
Conservative	Warwick Womack	418	52.1	
Liberal Democrats	Pelham Ravenscroft	385	47.9	
Majority		33	4.1	
Turnout		803	45.6	

=== The Hangers and Forest ===
The Hangers and Forest
Party	Candidate	Votes	%	±%
Conservative	Judy Onslow	unopposed		

=== Whitehill Chase ===
Whitehill Chase
Party	Candidate	Votes	%	±%
Liberal Democrats	Zoya Faddy	317	75.8	
Conservative	Joseph Davies	101	24.2	
Majority		216	51.7	
Turnout		418	22.9	

=== Whitehill Deadwater ===
Whitehill Deadwater
Party	Candidate	Votes	%	±%
Liberal Democrats	Helen Walters	247	61.0	
Conservative	Michael Cartwright	158	39.0	
Majority		89	22.0	
Turnout		405	20.4	

=== Whitehill Hogmoor ===
Whitehill Hogmoor
Party	Candidate	Votes	%	±%
Liberal Democrats	William Watkinson	349	72.9	
Conservative	Valerie Ferns	130	27.1	
Majority		219	45.7	
Turnout		479	27.5	

=== Whitehill Pinewood ===
Whitehill Pinewood
Party	Candidate	Votes	%	±%
Liberal Democrats	Donald Mayes	153	59.8	
Conservative	Philip Cochrane	103	40.2	
Majority		50	19.5	
Turnout		256	13.7	

=== Whitehill Walldown ===
Whitehill Walldown
Party	Candidate	Votes	%	±%
Liberal Democrats	Adam Carew	504	80.9	
Conservative	Barry Hope	119	19.1	
Majority		385	61.8	
Turnout		623	36.0	
