= 2011 East Hampshire District Council election =

2011 UK local government election

← 2007	5 May 2011	2015 →

All 44 council seats 23 seats needed for a majority

	Second party	Third party
Party	Conservative	Liberal Democrats
Last election	30 seats, 60.6%	14 seats, 35.1%
Seats won	39	5
Seat change	▲9	▼9
Popular vote	30,578	13,405
Percentage	61.0%	26.7%
Swing	▲0.4%	▼8.4%
- Map of the results of the 2011 election, by ward.
Previous Largest Party before election
Conservative
Subsequent Largest Party
Conservative

The 2011 East Hampshire District Council election took place on 5 May 2011 to elect members of East Hampshire District Council in Hampshire England. The whole council was up for election and the Conservative Party stayed in overall control of the council.

== Background ==
The previous election in 2007 saw the Conservatives increase their majority on the council after winning 30 seats, compared to 14 for the Liberal Democrats. In 2008 the councillor for Whitehill Pinewood, Ian Dowdle, defected from the Liberal Democrats to join the Conservatives. However, in 2010 Dowdle would resign from the Conservatives over the party's handling of the local eco-town and he then resigned from the council in January 2011. A further 2 defections took place in March 2011 with Conservatives Maureen Comber and Eve Hope, representing Selborne, and Bramshott and Liphook respectively, joining the Liberal Democrats.

== Election result ==
The results saw the Conservatives increase their majority on the council after gaining 9 seats from the Liberal Democrats compared to the 2007 election. This took the Conservatives to 39 councillors, compared to 5 Liberal Democrats, the largest majority since the founding of the council. Overall turnout in the election was 48%.

Conservatives gained 5 seats from the Liberal Democrats in Alton, including defeating the Liberal Democrat leader on the council, Jerry James, in Alton Wooteys. Other Conservative gains came in Clanfield and Finchdean, Horndean Kings, Horndean Murray and Petersfield Causeway. This left the Liberal Democrats with just 5 councillors, all in the Whitehill and Bordon area.

The Conservatives leader of the council Patrick Burridge described the results as "beyond my wildest dreams". Meanwhile, the new Liberal Democrat leader on the council Adam Carew put their defeats down to high Conservative turnout in the Alternative Vote referendum which was held at the same time as the council election and that the "low popularity rating" of the national Liberal Democrat leader Nick Clegg "had a negative effect".

East Hampshire local election result 2011
Party	Seats	Gains	Losses	Net gain/loss	Seats %	Votes %	Votes	+/−
Conservative	39	9	0	+9	88.6	61.0	30,578	+0.4%
Liberal Democrats	5	0	9	-9	11.4	26.7	13,405	-8.4%
Labour	0	0	0	0	0	10.8	5,418	+7.1%
Independent	0	0	0	0	0	0.9	452	+0.3%
JAC	0	0	0	0	0	0.5	275	+0.5%

5 Conservative candidates were unopposed at the election. Seat changes are compared to the 2007 election and do not take into account defections.

== Ward results ==
=== Alton Amery ===
Alton Amery
Party	Candidate	Votes	%	±%
Conservative	Robert Saunders	409	46.8	+15.9
Liberal Democrats	Jeff Smith	318	36.4	−21.0
Labour	Barbara Burfoot	146	16.7	+5.0
Majority		91	10.4	
Turnout		873	45.7	+12.6
Conservative gain from Liberal Democrats		Swing		

=== Alton Ashdell ===
Alton Ashdell
Party	Candidate	Votes	%	±%
Conservative	Andrew Joy	651	63.6	+2.5
Liberal Democrats	Chris McCallum	372	36.4	+3.5
Majority		279	27.3	−1.0
Turnout		1,023	53.8	+10.5
Conservative hold		Swing		

=== Alton Eastbrooke ===
Alton Eastbrooke
Party	Candidate	Votes	%	±%
Conservative	Dean Phillips	358	47.4	+11.9
Liberal Democrats	Pam Bradford	269	35.6	−18.1
Labour	Jan Treacher	128	17.0	+6.3
Majority		89	11.8	
Turnout		755	38.4	+13.7
Conservative gain from Liberal Democrats		Swing		

=== Alton Westbrooke ===
Alton Westbrooke
Party	Candidate	Votes	%	±%
Conservative	Nicholas Branch	467	45.9	+6.8
Liberal Democrats	Atu Patel	408	40.1	−20.8
Labour	Peter Treacher	143	14.0	+14.0
Majority		59	5.8	
Turnout		1,018	46.0	+12.1
Conservative gain from Liberal Democrats		Swing		

=== Alton Whitedown ===
Alton Whitedown
Party	Candidate	Votes	%	±%
Conservative	Maynard Melissa	578	48.7	+8.3
Liberal Democrats	Allan Chick	468	39.4	−14.7
Labour	Roger Godber	141	11.9	+6.5
Majority		110	9.3	
Turnout		1,187	52.6	+9.9
Conservative gain from Liberal Democrats		Swing		

=== Alton Wooteys ===
Alton Wooteys
Party	Candidate	Votes	%	±%
Conservative	David Orme	344	45.4	
Liberal Democrats	Jerry James	273	36.0	
Labour	Don Hammond	141	18.6	
Majority		71	9.4	
Turnout		758	42.3	
Conservative gain from Liberal Democrats		Swing		

=== Binstead and Bentley ===
Binsted and Bentley
Party	Candidate	Votes	%	±%
Conservative	Ken Carter	898	74.7	−5.5
Liberal Democrats	Mark Davison	304	25.3	+5.5
Majority		594	49.4	−11.1
Turnout		1,202	52.7	+7.5
Conservative hold		Swing		

=== Bramshott and Liphook ===
Bramshott and Liphook (3)
Party	Candidate	Votes	%	±%
Conservative	Anna James	1,485		
Conservative	Sam James	1,456		
Conservative	Angela Glass	1,436		
Liberal Democrats	Michael Croucher	947		
Liberal Democrats	Eve Hope	918		
Liberal Democrats	Rob Evans	841		
Labour	John Tough	503		
Labour	Catriona Mackenzie	304		
Labour	Ann Saunders	249		
Turnout		8,139	46.0	+11.7
Conservative hold		Swing		
Conservative hold		Swing		
Conservative hold		Swing		

=== Clanfield and Finchdean ===
Clanfield and Finchdean (2)
Party	Candidate	Votes	%	±%
Conservative	Ken Moon	1,164		
Conservative	David Newberry	1,019		
Liberal Democrats	Richard Judd	497		
Liberal Democrats	Bill Phipps	417		
Labour	Michael Burgess	252		
Labour	Margaret Broome	251		
Turnout		3,600	49.7	+8.1
Conservative hold		Swing		
Conservative gain from Liberal Democrats		Swing		

=== Downland ===
Downland
Party	Candidate	Votes	%	±%
Conservative	Patrick Burridge	883	76.4	+5.8
Liberal Democrats	Tony Ludlow	273	23.6	−5.8
Majority		610	52.8	+11.6
Turnout		1,156	59.1	+9.3
Conservative hold		Swing		

=== East Meon ===
East Meon
Party	Candidate	Votes	%	±%
Conservative	David Parkinson	unopposed		
Conservative hold		Swing		

=== Four Marks and Medstead ===
Four Marks and Medstead
Party	Candidate	Votes	%	±%
Conservative	Pat Seward	1,729		
Conservative	Maurice Johnson	1,703		
Liberal Democrats	Terry Taggart	682		
Labour	Carole Parsons	227		
Labour	Frances Thompson	184		
Turnout		4,525	52.0	+4.0
Conservative hold		Swing		
Conservative hold		Swing		

=== Froxfield and Steep ===
Froxfield and Steep
Party	Candidate	Votes	%	±%
Conservative	Nick Drew	unopposed		
Conservative hold		Swing		

=== Grayshott ===
Grayshott
Party	Candidate	Votes	%	±%
Conservative	Ferris Cowper	810	82.7	−2.4
Liberal Democrats	Tony Gray	167	17.3	+2.4
Majority		634	65.5	−4.7
Turnout		968	51.1	+8.1
Conservative hold		Swing		

=== Headley ===
Headley (2)
Party	Candidate	Votes	%	±%
Conservative	Anthony Williams	1,475		
Conservative	Richard Millard	1,436		
Liberal Democrats	Richard Clifford	576		
Liberal Democrats	Gary Hopwood	469		
Turnout		3,956	38.8	+1.1
Conservative hold		Swing		
Conservative hold		Swing		

=== Holybourne and Froyle ===
Holybourne and Froyle
Party	Candidate	Votes	%	±%
Conservative	Glynis Watts	810	68.6	+0.3
Liberal Democrats	Judith Janes	370	31.4	+7.6
Majority		440	37.3	−7.2
Turnout		1,180	57.0	+13.8
Conservative hold		Swing		

=== Horndean, Catherington and Lovedean ===
Horndean, Catherington and Lovedean
Party	Candidate	Votes	%	±%
Conservative	Sara Schillemore	589	69.5	+3.7
Liberal Democrats	Peter Humphreys	258	30.5	−3.7
Majority		331	39.1	+7.5
Turnout		847	43.8	+10.7
Conservative hold		Swing		

=== Horndean Downs ===
Horndean Downs
Party	Candidate	Votes	%	±%
Conservative	Julia Marshall	630	64.5	+13.8
Liberal Democrats	Terry Port	236	24.2	−25.1
Labour	Margaret Pain	111	11.4	+11.4
Majority		394	40.3	+39.0
Turnout		977	48.7	+13.8
Conservative hold		Swing		

=== Horndean, Hazleton and Blendworth ===
Horndean, Hazleton and Blendworth
Party	Candidate	Votes	%	±%
Conservative	Dorothy Denston	693	76.1	+0.5
Liberal Democrats	Elizabeth Port	218	23.9	−0.5
Majority		475	52.1	+0.9
Turnout		911	46.2	+9.8
Conservative hold		Swing		

=== Horndean Kings ===
Horndean Kings
Party	Candidate	Votes	%	±%
Conservative	David Evans	626	52.3	+14.5
Liberal Democrats	Samantha Darragh	420	35.1	−27.1
Labour	Derek Thompson	152	12.7	+12.7
Majority		206	17.2	
Turnout		1,198	47.9	+14.2
Conservative gain from Liberal Democrats		Swing		

=== Horndean Murray ===
Horndean Murray
Party	Candidate	Votes	%	±%
Conservative	Lynn Evans	501	57.7	+10.0
Liberal Democrats	Ian Maiden	224	25.8	−26.5
Labour	Katie Green	143	16.5	+16.5
Majority		277	31.9	
Turnout		868	45.1	+11.1
Conservative gain from Liberal Democrats		Swing		

=== Lindford ===
Lindford
Party	Candidate	Votes	%	±%
Conservative	Yvonne Parker-Smith	545	65.0	−9.6
Liberal Democrats	Brian Desmond	160	19.1	−6.3
Independent	Neville Taylor	134	16.0	+16.0
Majority		385	45.9	−3.4
Turnout		839	39.5	+6.0
Conservative hold		Swing		

=== Liss ===
Liss (2)
Party	Candidate	Votes	%	±%
Conservative	Gina Logan	1,173		
Conservative	Jennifer Gray	1,085		
Labour	Keith Budden	441		
Labour	Howard Linsley	439		
Liberal Democrats	Roger Mullenger	419		
Turnout		3,557	49.0	+10.3
Conservative hold		Swing		
Conservative hold		Swing		

=== Petersfield Bell Hill ===
Petersfield Bell Hill
Party	Candidate	Votes	%	±%
Conservative	John West	572	57.2	+4.0
Liberal Democrats	Grant Budden	235	23.5	−18.3
Labour	Beth Vaughan	193	19.3	+14.3
Majority		337	33.7	+22.3
Turnout		1,000	52.0	+12.2
Conservative hold		Swing		

=== Petersfield Causeway ===
Petersfield Causeway
Party	Candidate	Votes	%	±%
Conservative	Philip Aiston	511	52.8	+8.4
Liberal Democrats	Chris Mills	275	28.4	−18.3
Labour	James Bridge	182	18.8	+9.9
Majority		236	24.4	
Turnout		968	48.1	+5.0
Conservative gain from Liberal Democrats		Swing		

=== Petersfield Heath ===
Petersfield Heath
Party	Candidate	Votes	%	±%
Conservative	Julie Butler	unopposed		
Conservative hold		Swing		

=== Petersfield Rother ===
Petersfield Rother
Party	Candidate	Votes	%	±%
Conservative	Bob Ayer	844	71.0	
Labour	Bill Organ	344	29.0	
Majority		500	42.0	
Turnout		1,188	62.3	
Conservative hold		Swing		

=== Petersfield St Mary's ===
Petersfield St Mary's
Party	Candidate	Votes	%	±%
Conservative	Guy Stacpoole	717	67.8	+5.7
Labour	Julie Dickinson	340	32.2	+18.6
Majority		377	35.7	−2.1
Turnout		1,057	51.3	+7.2
Conservative hold		Swing		

=== Petersfield St Peter ===
Petersfield St Peters
Party	Candidate	Votes	%	±%
Conservative	Hilary Ayer	unopposed		
Conservative hold		Swing		

=== Ropley and Tisted ===
Ropley and Tisted
Party	Candidate	Votes	%	±%
Conservative	Christopher Graham	unopposed		
Conservative hold		Swing		

=== Rowlands Castle ===
Rowlands Castle
Party	Candidate	Votes	%	±%
Conservative	Marge Harvey	758	59.0	−7.0
Liberal Democrats	Steve Protheroe	427	33.2	−0.8
Labour	Greg Beckett-Leonard	100	7.8	+7.8
Majority		331	25.8	−6.2
Turnout		1,285	60.5	+11.1
Conservative hold		Swing		

=== Selborne ===
Selborne
Party	Candidate	Votes	%	±%
Conservative	David Ashcroft	734	72.4	+22.3
Liberal Democrats	Maureen Comber	151	14.9	−35.0
Labour	Sarah Hall	129	12.7	+12.7
Majority		583	57.5	+57.4
Turnout		1,014	57.4	+11.0
Conservative hold		Swing		

=== The Hangers and Forest ===
The Hangers and Forest
Party	Candidate	Votes	%	±%
Conservative	Judy Onslow	726	72.5	−6.8
JAC	Don Jerrard	275	27.5	+6.8
Majority		451	45.1	−13.5
Turnout		1,001	52.5	+7.5
Conservative hold		Swing		

=== Whitehill Chase ===
Whitehill Chase
Party	Candidate	Votes	%	±%
Liberal Democrats	Zoya Faddy	330	50.9	
Conservative	Dave Williamson	318	49.1	
Majority		12	1.8	
Turnout		648	37.1	
Liberal Democrats hold		Swing		

=== Whitehill Deadwater ===
Whitehill Deadwater
Party	Candidate	Votes	%	±%
Liberal Democrats	Tony Muldoon	427	78.8	+15.4
Labour	Francis MacNamara	115	21.2	+21.2
Majority		312	57.6	+30.8
Turnout		542	30.0	+11.9
Liberal Democrats hold		Swing		

=== Whitehill Hogmoor ===
Whitehill Hogmoor
Party	Candidate	Votes	%	±%
Liberal Democrats	Philip Drury	272	41.7	−29.4
Conservative	John Haine	193	29.6	+0.7
Independent	Roger Russell	128	19.6	+19.6
Labour	Timothy King	60	9.2	+9.2
Majority		79	12.1	−30.1
Turnout		653	33.0	+9.9
Liberal Democrats hold		Swing		

=== Whitehill Pinewood ===
Whitehill Pinewood
Party	Candidate	Votes	%	±%
Liberal Democrats	Chris Wherrell	260	57.8	+0.5
Independent	Bill Wain	190	42.2	+42.2
Majority		70	15.6	+0.9
Turnout		450	22.0	+2.6
Liberal Democrats hold		Swing		

=== Whitehill Walldown ===
Whitehill Walldown
Party	Candidate	Votes	%	±%
Liberal Democrats	Adam Carew	524	67.5	
Conservative	Keith Cooper	252	32.5	
Majority		272	35.0	
Turnout		776	44.1	
Liberal Democrats hold		Swing		
