= 2007 East Hampshire District Council election =

2007 UK local government election

← 2003	3 May 2007	2011 →

All 44 council seats 23 seats needed for a majority

	First party	Second party
Party	Conservative	Liberal Democrats
Last election	26 seats	18 seats
Seats won	30	14
Seat change	▲4	▲1
Popular vote	18,866	14,450
- Map of the results of the 2007 election, by ward.
Council control before election before election
Conservative
Council control after election
Conservative

The 2007 East Hampshire District Council election took place on 3 May 2007 to elect all 44 members of East Hampshire District Council in Hampshire England. The whole council was up for election and the Conservative Party stayed in overall control of the council.

== Election result ==
East Hampshire local election result 2007
Party	Seats	Gains	Losses	Net gain/loss	Seats %	Votes %	Votes	+/−
Conservative	30	2	0	+2	68.2	60.6	23,667	+7.1
Liberal Democrats	14	0	2	-2	31.8	35.1	13,725	-5.9
Labour	0	0	0	0	0.0	3.7	1,433	-0.7
Independent	0	0	0	0	0.0	0.6	249	-0.2

3 Conservative and 3 Liberal Democrat candidates were unopposed at the election.

== Ward results ==
=== Alton Amery ===
Alton Amery
Party	Candidate	Votes	%	±%
Liberal Democrats	Tony Ludlow	357	57.4	+0.8
Conservative	Glynis Watts	192	30.9	+3.5
Labour	Peter Treacher	73	11.7	−4.3
Majority		165	26.5	−2.8
Turnout		622	33.1	+2.0
Liberal Democrats hold		Swing		

=== Alton Ashdell ===
Alton Ashdell
Party	Candidate	Votes	%	±%
Conservative	Andrew Joy	489	61.1	+8.2
Liberal Democrats	Robert Saunders	263	32.9	−14.2
Labour	Barbara Burfoot	48	6.0	+6.0
Majority		226	28.3	+22.4
Turnout		800	43.3	+5.3
Conservative hold		Swing		

=== Alton Eastbrook ===
Alton Eastbrooke
Party	Candidate	Votes	%	±%
Liberal Democrats	Pamela Bradford	275	53.7	−4.7
Conservative	Chris Butler	182	35.5	+10.9
Labour	Janice Treacher	55	10.7	−6.3
Majority		93	18.2	−15.5
Turnout		512	24.7	+0.3
Liberal Democrats hold		Swing		

=== Alton Westbrooke ===
Alton Westbrooke
Party	Candidate	Votes	%	±%
Liberal Democrats	John Smith	438	60.9	−9.3
Conservative	Jacqueline Saunders	281	39.1	+9.3
Majority		157	21.8	−18.5
Turnout		719	33.9	+3.4
Liberal Democrats hold		Swing		

=== Alton Whitedown ===
Alton Whitedown
Party	Candidate	Votes	%	±%
Liberal Democrats	Allan Chick	517	54.1	+3.2
Conservative	Barry Hope	386	40.4	−8.7
Labour	Roger Godber	52	5.4	+5.4
Majority		131	13.7	+11.9
Turnout		955	42.7	+1.1
Liberal Democrats hold		Swing		

=== Alton Wooteys ===
Alton Wooteys
Party	Candidate	Votes	%	±%
Liberal Democrats	Jerry Janes	unopposed		
Liberal Democrats hold		Swing		

=== Binstead and Bentley ===
Binstead and Bentley
Party	Candidate	Votes	%	±%
Conservative	Ken Carter	796	80.2	
Liberal Democrats	Jonathan Heard	196	19.8	
Majority		600	60.4	
Turnout		992	45.2	
Conservative hold		Swing		

=== Bramshott and Liphook ===
Bramshott and Liphook (3)
Party	Candidate	Votes	%	±%
Conservative	Anna James	1,230		
Conservative	Sam James	1,172		
Conservative	Evelyn Hope	1,146		
Liberal Democrats	Rob Evans	819		
Liberal Democrats	James Walters	771		
Liberal Democrats	David Raison	737		
Labour	Peter Dare	196		
Labour	John Tough	186		
Turnout		6,257	34.3	+6.2
Conservative hold		Swing		
Conservative hold		Swing		
Conservative hold		Swing		

=== Clanfield and Finchdean ===
Clanfield and Finchdean (2)
Party	Candidate	Votes	%	±%
Liberal Democrats	Sam Payne	820		
Conservative	Ken Moon	782		
Liberal Democrats	Peters Rodgers	781		
Conservative	Dave Harvey	668		
Turnout		3,051	41.6	+9.7
Liberal Democrats hold		Swing		
Conservative gain from Liberal Democrats		Swing		

=== Downland ===
Downland
Party	Candidate	Votes	%	±%
Conservative	Patrick Burridge	667	70.6	−0.9
Liberal Democrats	Jimmy Patel	278	29.4	+0.9
Majority		389	41.2	−1.8
Turnout		945	49.8	+9.7
Conservative hold		Swing		

=== East Meon ===
East Meon
Party	Candidate	Votes	%	±%
Conservative	David Parkinson	unopposed		
Conservative hold		Swing		

=== Four Marks and Medstead ===
Four Marks and Medstead (2)
Party	Candidate	Votes	%	±%
Conservative	Patricia Seward	1,298		
Conservative	Maurice Johnson	1,287		
Liberal Democrats	John Hopkin	687		
Liberal Democrats	Jacky Powers	676		
Turnout		3,948	48.0	+3.0
Conservative hold		Swing		
Conservative hold		Swing		

=== Froxfield and Steep ===
Froxfield and Steep
Party	Candidate	Votes	%	±%
Conservative	Jennifer Gray	unopposed		
Conservative hold		Swing		

=== Grayshott ===
Grayshott
Party	Candidate	Votes	%	±%
Conservative	Ferris Cowper	707	85.1	+0.1
Liberal Democrats	Nicholas James	124	14.9	+14.9
Majority		583	70.2	+0.2
Turnout		831	43.0	+3.5
Conservative hold		Swing		

=== Headley ===
Headley (2)
Party	Candidate	Votes	%	±%
Conservative	Anthony Williams	1,094		
Conservative	Richard Millard	1,040		
Liberal Democrats	Richard Clifford	563		
Liberal Democrats	Gary Hopwood	493		
Turnout		3,190	37.7	+6.7
Conservative hold		Swing		
Conservative hold		Swing		

=== Holybourne and Froyle ===
Holybourne and Froyle
Party	Candidate	Votes	%	±%
Conservative	David O'Donnell	632	68.3	+13.4
Liberal Democrats	Roger Fitzer	220	23.8	+1.1
Independent	Brian Nonhebel	74	8.0	−6.2
Majority		412	44.5	+12.2
Turnout		926	43.2	+1.4
Conservative hold		Swing		

=== Hordean Catherington and Lovedean ===
Horndean Catherington and Lovedean
Party	Candidate	Votes	%	±%
Conservative	Sara Schillemore	414	65.8	+8.5
Liberal Democrats	Sarah McEwan	215	34.2	−8.5
Majority		199	31.6	+16.9
Turnout		629	33.1	−0.5
Conservative hold		Swing		

=== Horndean Downs ===
Horndean Downs
Party	Candidate	Votes	%	±%
Conservative	Julia Marshall	348	50.7	+17.6
Liberal Democrats	Daphne Giddings	339	49.3	−17.6
Majority		9	1.4	
Turnout		687	34.9	+0.4
Conservative gain from Liberal Democrats		Swing		

=== Horndean Hazleton & Blendworth ===
Horndean Hazleton & Blendworth
Party	Candidate	Votes	%	±%
Conservative	Dorothy Denston	536	75.6	+2.0
Liberal Democrats	Ian Maiden	173	24.4	−2.0
Majority		363	51.2	+4.0
Turnout		709	36.4	+6.5
Conservative hold		Swing		

=== Horndean Kings ===
Horndean Kings
Party	Candidate	Votes	%	±%
Liberal Democrats	Ken Graham	511	62.2	
Conservative	William Gordon	310	37.8	
Majority		201	24.4	
Turnout		821	33.7	
Liberal Democrats hold		Swing		

=== Horndean Murray ===
Horndean Murray
Party	Candidate	Votes	%	±%
Liberal Democrats	Mike Ashton	333	52.3	−15.3
Conservative	Christine Kittredge	304	47.7	+15.3
Majority		29	4.6	−30.7
Turnout		637	34.0	+7.0
Liberal Democrats hold		Swing		

=== Lindford ===
Lindford
Party	Candidate	Votes	%	±%
Conservative	Yvonne Parker-Smith	450	74.6	+6.4
Liberal Democrats	Liz King	153	25.4	−6.4
Majority		297	49.3	+13.0
Turnout		603	33.5	+4.2
Conservative hold		Swing		

=== Liss ===
Liss (2)
Party	Candidate	Votes	%	±%
Conservative	Elizabeth Cartwright	1,171		
Conservative	Gina Logan	1,088		
Labour	Howard Linsley	298		
Labour	Leslie Hammond	297		
Turnout		2,854	38.7	+0.7
Conservative hold		Swing		
Conservative hold		Swing		

=== Petersfield Bell Hill ===
Petersfield Bell Hill
Party	Candidate	Votes	%	±%
Conservative	John West	396	53.2	+8.8
Liberal Democrats	Roger Mullenger	311	41.8	+4.5
Labour	Moira Johnson	37	5.0	−13.3
Majority		85	11.4	+4.3
Turnout		744	39.8	+8.1
Conservative hold		Swing		

=== Petersfield Causeway ===
Petersfield Causeway
Party	Candidate	Votes	%	±%
Liberal Democrats	Anne Claxton	364	46.7	−3.3
Conservative	Robert Matthews	346	44.4	+4.6
Labour	Bill Organ	69	8.9	−1.3
Majority		18	2.3	−7.9
Turnout		779	43.1	+6.0
Liberal Democrats hold		Swing		

=== Petersfield Heath ===
Petersfield Heath
Party	Candidate	Votes	%	±%
Conservative	Julie Butler	353	55.5	−0.1
Liberal Democrats	Phillip Humphries	283	44.5	+0.1
Majority		70	11.0	−0.3
Turnout		636	38.4	+1.5
Conservative hold		Swing		

=== Petersfield Rother ===
Petersfield Rother
Party	Candidate	Votes	%	±%
Conservative	Bob Ayer	unopposed		
Conservative hold		Swing		

=== Petersfield St Mary's ===
Petersfield St Mary's
Party	Candidate	Votes	%	±%
Conservative	Guy Stacpoole	557	62.1	−12.8
Liberal Democrats	Jonathan Coninx	218	24.3	+24.3
Labour	Christine Straw	122	13.6	−11.5
Majority		339	37.8	−11.9
Turnout		897	44.1	+1.1
Conservative hold		Swing		

=== Petersfield St Peter's ===
Petersfield St Peter's
Party	Candidate	Votes	%	±%
Conservative	Hilary Ayer	396	71.2	+6.4
Liberal Democrats	Alex Pinhorn	160	28.8	−6.4
Majority		236	42.4	+12.9
Turnout		556	30.4	−1.8
Conservative hold		Swing		

=== Ropley and Tisted ===
Ropley and Tisted
Party	Candidate	Votes	%	±%
Conservative	Chris Graham	775	84.3	+35.7
Liberal Democrats	Liz Ludlow	144	15.7	−35.7
Majority		631	68.6	
Turnout		919	52.7	−5.9
Conservative hold		Swing		

=== Rowlands Castle ===
Rowlands Castle
Party	Candidate	Votes	%	±%
Conservative	Marge Harvey	672	66.0	+29.4
Liberal Democrats	Peter Whitaker	346	34.0	−29.4
Majority		326	32.0	
Turnout		1,018	49.4	+7.8
Conservative hold		Swing		

=== Selborne ===
Selborne
Party	Candidate	Votes	%	±%
Conservative	Maureen Comber	413	50.1	−2.0
Liberal Democrats	Keith Pritchard	412	49.9	+2.0
Majority		1	0.1	−4.0
Turnout		825	46.4	+0.8
Conservative hold		Swing		

=== The Hangers and Forest ===
The Hangers and Forest
Party	Candidate	Votes	%	±%
Conservative	Judy Onslow	671	79.3	
Independent	Donald Jerrard	175	20.7	
Majority		496	58.6	
Turnout		846	45.0	
Conservative hold		Swing		

=== Whitehill Chase ===
Whitehill Chase
Party	Candidate	Votes	%	±%
Liberal Democrats	Zoya Faddy	unopposed		
Liberal Democrats hold		Swing		

=== Whitehill Deadwater ===
Whitehill Deadwater
Party	Candidate	Votes	%	±%
Liberal Democrats	Tony Muldoon	227	63.4	+2.4
Conservative	Colin Leach	131	36.6	−2.4
Majority		96	26.8	+4.8
Turnout		358	18.1	−2.3
Liberal Democrats hold		Swing		

=== Whitehill Hogmoor ===
Whitehill Hogmoor
Party	Candidate	Votes	%	±%
Liberal Democrats	Philip Drury	298	71.1	−1.8
Conservative	Olivia Todd-Russett	121	28.9	+1.8
Majority		177	42.2	−3.5
Turnout		419	23.1	−4.4
Liberal Democrats hold		Swing		

=== Whitehill Pinewood ===
Whitehill Pinewood
Party	Candidate	Votes	%	±%
Liberal Democrats	Ian Dowdle	223	57.3	−2.5
Conservative	Chris Jones	166	42.7	+2.5
Majority		57	14.7	−4.8
Turnout		389	19.4	+5.7
Liberal Democrats hold		Swing		

=== Whitehill Walldown ===
Whitehill Walldown
Party	Candidate	Votes	%	±%
Liberal Democrats	Adam Carew	unopposed		
Liberal Democrats hold		Swing		
