= 2023 East Hampshire District Council election =

2023 UK local government election

- 4 May 2023

All 43 seats to East Hampshire District Council 22 seats needed for a majority

	First party	Second party	Third party
Leader	Richard Millard	Steve Hunt	Andy Tree
Party	Conservative	Liberal Democrats	WBCP
Leader's seat	Headley	Alton Amery	Whitehill Chase
Last election	32 seats, 48.2%	7 seats, 28.1%	0 seats
Seats before	31	7	0
Seats won	19	14	6
	Fourth party	Fifth party	Sixth party
Party	Green	Labour	Independent
Last election	0 seats, 10.4%	2 seats, 4.3%	2 seats, 4.3%
Seats before	1	0	2
Seats won	2	1	1
Leader before election
Richard Millard
Conservative
Leader after election
Richard Millard
Conservative
No overall control

The 2023 East Hampshire District Council election took place on 4 May 2023 to elect members of East Hampshire District Council in Hampshire, England. This was on the same day as other local elections.

== Summary ==
Prior to the election the council was under Conservative majority control. After the election the council was under no overall control, although the Conservatives remained the largest party. A coalition of the Conservatives and local party the Whitehill and Bordon Community Party formed after the election, with Conservative councillor Richard Millard retaining his position as leader of the council.

=== Election result ===
2023 East Hampshire District Council election
Party	Candidates	Seats	Gains	Losses	Net gain/loss	Seats %	Votes %	Votes	+/−
Conservative	43	19	0	13	▼13	44.2	43.5	23,973	–2.7
Liberal Democrats	33	14	9	2	▲7	32.6	32.2	17,777	+4.8
WBCP	6	6	6	0	▲6	14.0	7.3	4,044	N/A
Green	11	2	2	0	▲2	4.7	6.5	3,565	–3.4
Labour	24	1	0	1	▼1	2.3	9.2	5,077	–0.8
Independent	2	1	0	1	▼1	2.3	0.9	477	–2.8
Reform	3	0	0	0	Steady	0.0	0.3	153	N/A
Heritage	1	0	0	0	Steady	0.0	0.1	82	N/A

== Ward results ==
The Statement of Persons Nominated, which details the candidates standing in each ward, was released by East Hampshire District Council following the close of nominations on 5 April 2023. The election results for the district were released on 5 May 2023.

=== Alton Amery ===
Alton Amery
Party	Candidate	Votes	%	±%
Liberal Democrats	Steve Hunt*	395	53.31	+0.44
Conservative	Dami Sogbesan	218	29.42	−6.74
Labour	Ian Abbott	128	17.27	+6.31
Majority		177	23.89	7.18
Turnout		741	35.3	
Liberal Democrats hold		Swing		

=== Alton Ashdell ===
Alton Ashdell
Party	Candidate	Votes	%	±%
Liberal Democrats	Suzie Burns*	418	52.98	−1.84
Conservative	Louis Ward	267	33.84	−4.38
Labour	Jennifer Abbott	104	13.18	+6.24
Majority		151	19.14	2.54
Turnout		789	43.3	
Liberal Democrats hold		Swing		

=== Alton Eastbrooke ===
Alton Eastbrooke
Party	Candidate	Votes	%	±%
Labour	Barbara Tansey	202	39.22	+3.28
Conservative	Tony Davis	143	27.77	−4.71
Liberal Democrats	Steven Coatsworth	142	27.57	−3.99
Reform	William Blake	28	5.44	N/A
Majority		59	11.46	8.00
Turnout		515	27.2	
Labour hold		Swing		

=== Alton Holybourne ===
Alton Holybourne
Party	Candidate	Votes	%	±%
Conservative	Graham Hill*	343	42.61	−4.39
Liberal Democrats	Samuel Corlett	330	40.99	+3.58
Labour	Donald Hammond	132	16.40	+0.83
Majority		13		
Turnout		805	37.5	
Conservative hold		Swing		

=== Alton Westbrooke ===
Alton Westbrooke
Party	Candidate	Votes	%	±%
Liberal Democrats	Emily Young	334	43.72	−3.33
Labour	Nick O'Brien	205	26.83	+11.37
Conservative	Philip Bennett	199	26.05	−11.43
Reform	Vic Burbidge	26	3.40	N/A
Majority		129		
Turnout		764	39.0	
Liberal Democrats hold		Swing		

=== Alton Whitedown ===
Alton Whitedown
Party	Candidate	Votes	%	±%
Liberal Democrats	Ginny Boxall*	547	61.88	−7.03
Conservative	Aaron Brett	241	27.26	+2.18
Labour	Janice Treacher	96	10.86	+4.86
Majority		306		
Turnout		884	38.8	
Liberal Democrats hold		Swing		

=== Alton Wooteys ===
Alton Wooteys
Party	Candidate	Votes	%	±%
Liberal Democrats	Warren Moore	234	33.86	N/A
Conservative	Colin Jamieson	213	30.82	−17.57
Labour	Mark Boyce-Churn	162	23.44	−28.16
Heritage	Matthew Kellermann	82	11.86	N/A
Majority		21	3.04	
Turnout		691	28.5	
Liberal Democrats gain from Labour		Swing		

=== Bentworth & Froyle ===
Bentworth & Froyle
Party	Candidate	Votes	%	±%
Conservative	Tony Costigan	590	61.52	−14.82
Green	Caroline Footman	369	38.48	N/A
Majority				
Turnout		959	43.2	
Conservative hold		Swing		

=== Binsted, Bentley & Selborne ===
Binsted, Bentley & Selborne (2 seats)
Party	Candidate	Votes	%	±%
Conservative	David Ashcroft*	917	52.46	−5.64
Conservative	Phillip Davies	878	50.23	+0.03
Liberal Democrats	Nicholas James	735	42.05	−5.32
Liberal Democrats	Bob Stammers	645	36.90	N/A
Labour	Ben Hamlin	286	16.36	+1.34
Majority				
Turnout		1,748	37.1	
Conservative hold		Swing		
Conservative hold		Swing		

=== Bramshott & Liphook ===
Bramshott & Liphook (3 seats)
Party	Candidate	Votes	%	±%
Conservative	Angela Glass*	1,131	47.48	−12.35
Conservative	Bill Mouland*	1,125	47.23	−14.74
Conservative	Nick Sear*	1,070	44.92	−13.87
Liberal Democrats	Rob Evans	734	30.81	N/A
Liberal Democrats	Philip Coghlan	683	28.67	N/A
Green	Liz Bisset	410	17.21	N/A
Labour	Andria Holdsworth	404	16.96	−3.76
Labour	John Tough	393	16.50	−4.39
Labour	Geraldine Sheedy	378	15.87	−1.31
Green	David Ilsley	254	10.66	N/A
Green	Peter Bisset	235	9.87	N/A
Majority				
Turnout		2,382	32.4	
Conservative hold		Swing		
Conservative hold		Swing		
Conservative hold		Swing		

=== Buriton & East Meon ===
Buriton & East Meon
Party	Candidate	Votes	%	±%
Conservative	Rob Mocatta*	475	57.51	+3.39
Liberal Democrats	Richard Robinson	231	27.97	N/A
Labour	Emma Clews	120	14.53	+5.22
Majority		244		
Turnout		826	39.3	
Conservative hold		Swing		

=== Clanfield ===
Clanfield (2 seats)
Party	Candidate	Votes	%	±%
Liberal Democrats	John Smart	862	54.01	+8.72
Liberal Democrats	Christopher Tonge	813	50.94	N/A
Conservative	Ken Moon*	722	45.24	−7.47
Conservative	Arthur Agate*	691	43.30	−9.70
Majority				
Turnout		1,596	35.5	
Liberal Democrats gain from Conservative		Swing		
Liberal Democrats gain from Conservative		Swing		

=== Four Marks & Medstead ===
Four Marks & Medstead (3 seats)
Party	Candidate	Votes	%	±%
Liberal Democrats	Joanna Nelson	1,181	47.66	+12.11
Conservative	Ilena Allsopp	1,094	44.15	−18.31
Conservative	Neal Day	1,090	43.99	−11.61
Liberal Democrats	Roland Richardson	1,065	42.98	N/A
Liberal Democrats	Alex Ehrmann	1,057	42.66	N/A
Conservative	David Foster	1,046	42.21	−12.61
Labour	Christopher Oakes-Monger	453	18.28	+8.64
Labour	Robert Peters	264	10.65	+2.14
Majority				
Turnout		2,478	38.5	
Liberal Democrats gain from Conservative		Swing		
Conservative hold		Swing		
Conservative hold		Swing		

=== Froxfield, Sheet & Steep ===
Froxfield, Sheet & Steep
Party	Candidate	Votes	%	±%
Conservative	Nick Drew*	644	55.95	+0.91
Liberal Democrats	Christopher Grey	427	37.10	−1.83
Labour	Yvonne Heaton	80	6.95	+0.94
Majority		217		
Turnout		1,151	51.4	
Conservative hold		Swing		

=== Grayshott ===
Grayshott
Party	Candidate	Votes	%	±%
Conservative	Tom Hanrahan*	387	52.80	−3.85
Liberal Democrats	Lynsey Conway	346	47.20	+16.43
Majority		41		
Turnout		733	34.7	
Conservative hold		Swing		

=== Headley ===
Headley (2 seats)
Party	Candidate	Votes	%	±%
Conservative	Richard Millard*	949	59.16	+4.92
Conservative	Anthony Williams*	904	56.36	−4.12
Liberal Democrats	David Jamieson	603	37.59	+5.43
Labour	Mark Angear	429	26.75	+19.82
Majority				
Turnout		1,604	36.2	
Conservative hold		Swing		
Conservative hold		Swing		

=== Horndean Catherington ===
Horndean Catherington
Party	Candidate	Votes	%	±%
Conservative	Sara Schillemore*	469	63.38	+63.38
Liberal Democrats	Jonquil Tonge	271	36.62	N/A
Majority		198		
Turnout		740	35.5	
Conservative hold		Swing		

=== Horndean Downs ===
Horndean Downs
Party	Candidate	Votes	%	±%
Green	James Hogan	480	58.11	+42.25
Conservative	Jon Whitfield	346	41.89	−10.77
Majority		134		
Turnout		826	34.6	
Green gain from Conservative		Swing		

=== Horndean Kings & Blendworth ===
Horndean Kings & Blendworth (2 seats)
Party	Candidate	Votes	%	±%
Conservative	David Evans*	671	55.09	−4.23
Conservative	Christopher Hatter*	587	48.19	−4.89
Liberal Democrats	Diane Smart	518	42.53	+2.70
Green	Phil Humphries	454	37.27	+5.37
Majority				
Turnout		1,218	31.7	
Conservative hold		Swing		
Conservative hold		Swing		

=== Horndean Murray ===
Horndean Murray
Party	Candidate	Votes	%	±%
Liberal Democrats	Elaine Woodard*	340	52.80	−0.46
Conservative	Jack Ross	304	47.20	+0.46
Majority		36		
Turnout		644	40.7	
Liberal Democrats hold		Swing		

=== Lindford ===
Lindford
Party	Candidate	Votes	%	±%
WBCP	Penny Flux	487	69.67	N/A
Conservative	Richard Hudson	160	22.89	−8.67
Labour	Gareth Rees	52	7.44	+3.15
Majority		327		
Turnout		699	34.1	
WBCP gain from Independent		Swing		

=== Liss ===
Liss (2 seats)
Party	Candidate	Votes	%	±%
Liberal Democrats	Roger Mullenger	883	45.99	+14.36
Green	Ian James	844	43.96	+12.65
Conservative	Keith Budden*	746	38.85	−14.34
Conservative	Peter Doyle	661	34.43	−11.48
Labour	Howard Linsley	407	21.20	+8.65
Majority				
Turnout		1,920	38.5	
Liberal Democrats gain from Conservative		Swing		
Green gain from Conservative		Swing		

=== Petersfield Bell Hill ===
Petersfield Bell Hill
Party	Candidate	Votes	%	±%
Independent	Jamie Matthews*	393	52.33	+0.96
Conservative	Russell Oppenheimer	174	23.17	+3.48
Labour	Gary Boller	97	12.92	+5.44
Green	John Hilton	87	11.58	−3.82
Majority		219	29.16	−2.52
Turnout		751	37.2	−6.81
Independent hold		Swing		

=== Petersfield Causeway ===
Petersfield Causeway
Party	Candidate	Votes	%	±%
Liberal Democrats	John Hutchinson	408	49.04	+6.78
Conservative	Tom Ross	333	40.02	−3.47
Labour	Ros Carvell	91	10.94	−3.30
Majority		75	9.01	
Turnout		832	37.3	+2.83
Liberal Democrats gain from Conservative		Swing		

=== Petersfield Heath ===
Petersfield Heath
Party	Candidate	Votes	%	±%
Liberal Democrats	Louise Bevan	423	45.00	+24.24
Conservative	Julie Butler*	420	44.68	−4.79
Labour	Sam Ansell	97	10.32	+2.80
Majority		3		
Turnout		940	42.1	−0.88
Liberal Democrats gain from Conservative		Swing		

=== Petersfield St Peter's ===
Petersfield St Peter's (2 seats)
Party	Candidate	Votes	%	±%
Liberal Democrats	Phil Shaw	1,056	55.17	+27.89
Liberal Democrats	David Podger	1,026	53.61	+25.68
Conservative	JC Crissey	747	39.03	+8.45
Conservative	Beth Svarovska	702	36.68	+6.75
Labour	Jeremy Abraham	275	14.37	+7.21
Majority				
Turnout		1,914	42.2	
Liberal Democrats gain from Conservative		Swing		
Liberal Democrats gain from Conservative		Swing		

=== Ropley, Hawkley & Hangers ===
Ropley, Hawkley & Hangers
Party	Candidate	Votes	%	±%
Conservative	Charles Louisson*	650	65.79	−2.47
Liberal Democrats	Jenny Stacy	338	34.21	N/A
Majority		312		
Turnout		988	43.9	
Conservative hold		Swing		

=== Rowlands Castle ===
Rowlands Castle
Party	Candidate	Votes	%	±%
Conservative	Charlene Maines	529	52.32	−7.07
Green	Laurent Coffre	383	37.88	−2.72
Reform	Luis Cook	99	9.79	N/A
Majority		146		
Turnout		1,011	38.9	
Conservative hold		Swing		

=== Whitehill Chase ===
Whitehill Chase (2 seats)
Party	Candidate	Votes	%	±%
WBCP	Andy Tree	875	71.90	N/A
WBCP	Catherine Clark	776	63.76	N/A
Conservative	Sally Pond*	226	18.57	−25.73
Liberal Democrats	Paul Wigman*	191	15.69	−27.89
Conservative	Emmanuel Anyanwu	160	13.15	−27.94
Liberal Democrats	Michael Croucher	135	11.09	−23.26
Majority				
Turnout		1,217	25.3	
WBCP gain from Conservative		Swing		
WBCP gain from Liberal Democrats		Swing		

=== Whitehill Hogmoor & Greatham ===
Whitehill Hogmoor & Greatham (2 seats)
Party	Candidate	Votes	%	±%
WBCP	Kirsty Mitchell	801	52.80	N/A
WBCP	Mike Steevens	735	48.45	N/A
Conservative	Adam Carew*	396	26.10	−22.39
Conservative	SJ Bartlett	310	20.44	−21.01
Liberal Democrats	Alison Glasspol	216	14.24	−22.35
Liberal Democrats	Antony Gray	190	12.52	−27.03
Labour	Jessie Hickman	114	7.51	−1.50
Labour	Jane Crinnion	108	7.12	−1.32
Majority				
Turnout		1,517	31.2	
WBCP gain from Conservative		Swing		
WBCP gain from Conservative		Swing		

=== Whitehill Pinewood ===
Whitehill Pinewood
Party	Candidate	Votes	%	±%
WBCP	Adeel Shah	370	67.52	N/A
Independent	Trevor Maroney*	84	15.33	−29.82
Green	Jason Guy	49	8.94	N/A
Conservative	David Hales	45	8.21	−32.39
Majority		286		
Turnout		548	25.6	
WBCP gain from Liberal Democrats		Swing		

== By-elections ==
=== Four Marks and Medstead ===
Four Marks and Medstead: 15 February 2024
Party	Candidate	Votes	%	±%
Liberal Democrats	Roland Richardson	1,212	62.2	+18.9
Conservative	Kerry Southern-Reason	736	37.8	−2.3
Majority		476	24.4	
Turnout		1,948	30.6	−7.9
Liberal Democrats hold		Swing	▲10.6	

=== Alton Amery ===
Alton Amery by-election: 21 August 2025
Party	Candidate	Votes	%	±%
Liberal Democrats	Lizzie Marshall	407	55.0	+1.7
Reform	Richard Dean Moore	189	25.5	N/A
Conservative	Brighton Gono	145	19.5	−9.9
Majority		218	29.5	+5.6
Turnout		744	36.5	+1.2
Liberal Democrats hold				
