= 1999 East Hampshire District Council election =

1999 UK local government election

The 1999 East Hampshire District Council election took place on 6 May 1999 to elect members of East Hampshire District Council in Hampshire England. The whole council was up for election and the Conservative Party gained overall control of the council from the Liberal Democrats.

== Election result ==
East Hampshire local election result 1999
Party	Seats	Gains	Losses	Net gain/loss	Seats %	Votes %	Votes	+/−
Conservative	21			+9	51.2			
Liberal Democrats	17			-9	41.5			
Independent	3			0	7.3			

One seat was vacant at the time of the election.
