= The Justice & Anti-Corruption Party =

- Abbreviation: JAC
- Leader: Donald Jerrard
- Founded: 2010

Website
- www.jacparty.org.uk

The Justice & Anti-Corruption Party or JAC is a minor political party launched in Britain before the 2010 general election and registered with the Electoral Commission on 13 April 2010. It was formed by Leslie Cummings and Donald Jerrard, who contested Portsmouth South and Hampshire East at that election.

The party contested one seat at the 2015 general election and three seats in the 2017 and 2019 general elections all in the Hampshire area.

Leslie Cummings was recorded as party leader from its first registration until 2015. In 2011, he was convicted of "making a false statement to affect the return of the election" under the Representation of the People Act. In his election leaflet pamphlet, he had falsely claimed that Mike Hancock, the Liberal Democrat MP for Portsmouth South was a paedophile. He was fined £500 at Southampton Magistrates' Court. The party's current leader is Donald Jerrard. Jerrard, from Southampton, is a former business lawyer and senior partner at Baker & McKenzie. He had intended contesting Fareham for UKIP in the 2015 general election. His wife, Susan, is also a party candidate; she contested Hampshire East in 2017 polling less than 1% of the votes.

== Elections contested ==
2010 general election

Constituency	Candidate	Votes	%
Hampshire, E	Donald Jerrard	310	0.6
Portsmouth, S	Leslie Cummings	117	0.3

2015 general election

Constituency	Candidate	Votes	%
Portsmouth, S	Donald Jerrard	99	0.2

2017 general election

Constituency	Candidate	Votes	%
Hampshire, E	Susan Jerrard	571	1.0
Romsey & Southampton, N	Donald Jerrard	271	0.5
Winchester	Teresa Skelton	149	0.3

2019 general election

Constituency	Candidate	Votes	%
Hampshire, E	Eddie Trotter	196	0.3
Portsmouth South	Steven George	240	0.5
Winchester	Teresa Skelton	292	0.5
