= Oakham Hill =

Hill in Hampshire, England

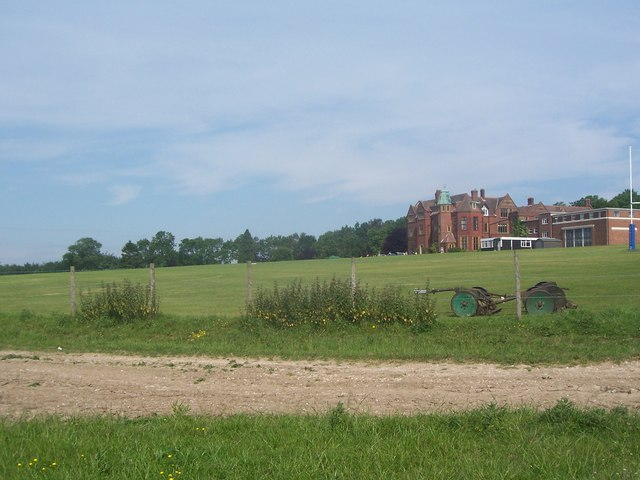
- Ditcham Park School on the southern spur of Oakham Hill

Highest point
- Elevation: 202 m (663 ft)
- Prominence: 65 m (213 ft)
- Parent peak: Butser Hill
- Coordinates: 50°57′51″N 0°56′04″W

Geography
- Location: Hampshire, England
- Parent range: South Downs
- OS grid: SU749188
- Topo map: OS Landranger

Oakham Hill is one of the highest points in the county of Hampshire, England, and in the South Downs, rising to 202 metres (663 ft) above sea level.

Oakham Hill rises about 1 kilometre southeast of the village of Buriton in Hampshire and just a few hundred metres east of the county boundary with West Sussex. Just to the west are the summits of Head Down (205 m), War Down (244 m) and the highest point in the South Downs, Butser Hill (270 m), in the heart of the Queen Elizabeth Country Park. On the southern spur of Oakham Hill is Ditcham Park School, a private educational establishment. Oakham Hill is also the site of the British Schools’ Cycling Association's National Hill Climb Time Trial, which in 2013 attracted one hundred and sixty competitors between the ages of 5 and 16, 34 of which were also pupils of Ditcham Park School.
