= Buriton =

Village and parish in Hampshire, England

Coordinates: 50.977°N 0.949°W

- Location within Hampshire
- Population: 736 (2001)
- OS grid reference: SU739200
- Civil parish: Buriton
- District: East Hampshire
- Shire county: Hampshire
- Region: South East
- Country: England
- Sovereign state: United Kingdom
- Post town: Petersfield
- Postcode district: GU31
- Police: Hampshire and Isle of Wight
- Fire: Hampshire and Isle of Wight
- Ambulance: South Central
- UK Parliament: East Hampshire

Buriton (/ˈbɛrɪtən/) is a village and civil parish in the East Hampshire district of Hampshire, England. It is located 2 miles (3.3 km) south of Petersfield.

== History ==
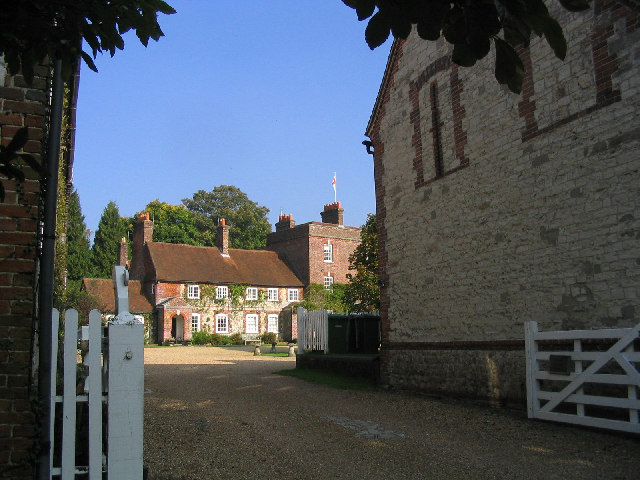
The Manor House, formerly lived in by Lothian Bonham-Carter

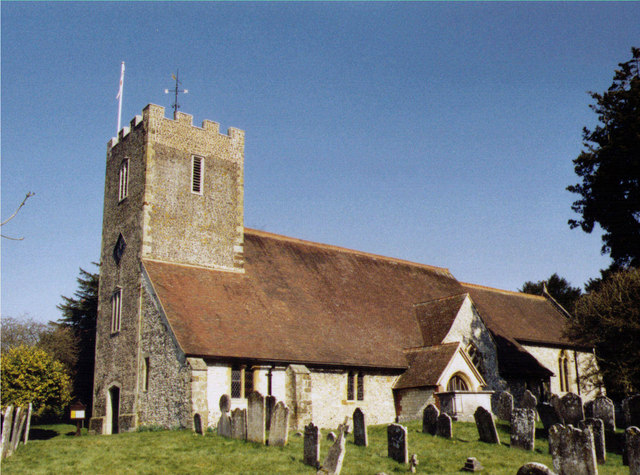
St Mary's Church, Buriton

About a mile north-west of Buriton was the extensive manor of West Mapledurham, formerly the property of the Bilson and Legge families, and later the Gibbons and Bonham-Carters. Edward Gibbon, author of the classic Decline and Fall of the Roman Empire, among other works, lived at Buriton Manor for much of the second half of the eighteenth century. John Goodyer, the seventeenth-century botanist, was buried at St Mary's and is commemorated with a stained glass window there.

The local landowners until recent times, the Bonham-Carters, owned land surrounding Buriton and neighbouring villages where they often reared game for local shoots. The Legge family were gamekeepers for the Bonham-Carters for many years. Other forms of employment in the past were Hop-picking, or working in the local lime kilns, which closed in 1920.

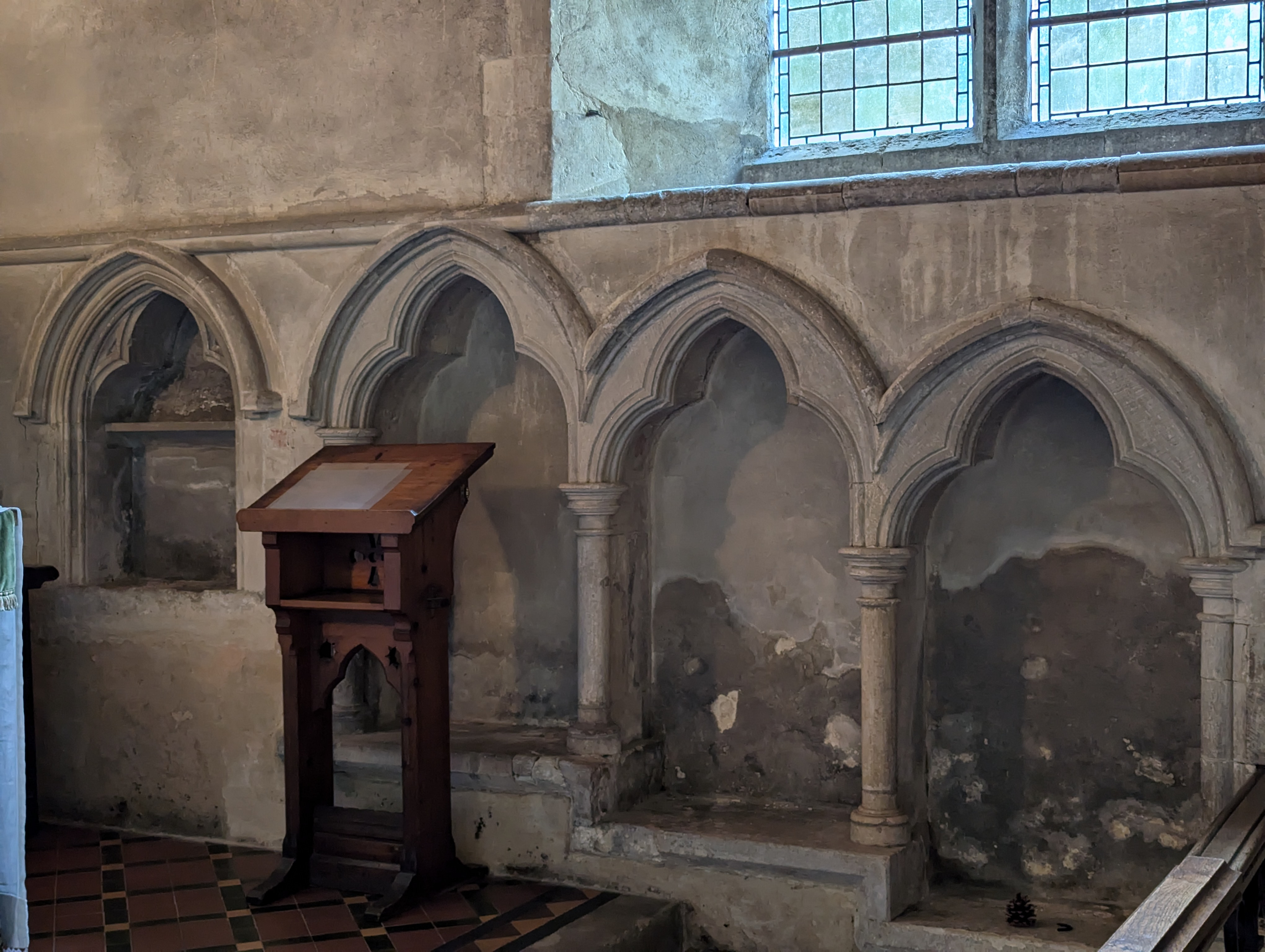
The piscina (left of wooden lectern) and sedilia in St. Mary's church, Buriton, Hampshire

Notable in St Mary's church are the medieval sedilia, the Norman arches, and pillars bearing carvings of water lilies, foliage and scallops. There is a Norman font in the church. On the low side of the window in the south wall of the chancel is a medieval mural painting of the Virgin and Child (13th century).

== Geography ==
Buriton lies at the foot of the South Downs escarpment, just east of the A3 road. One kilometre to the south rises the tree-covered hill of Head Down (205 m), one of the highest points of the South Downs and flanked on either side by two other high points, War Down (244 m) and Oakham Hill (202 m).

The nearest railway station is 2 miles (3.3 km) north of the village, at Petersfield.

The village has two tennis courts, two pubs - The Five Bells and The Nest Hotel & Restaurant, a village hall, a large village pond with ducks and fish, a car park and the Church of St. Mary. There is no shop in the village. The village has its own school, "Buriton Primary School", with about 80 pupils from the village and nearby.

The main roads of Buriton are called High Street and Petersfield Road.

It is a rural, peaceful place, with the possible exception of the main railway line, the Portsmouth to London line (Portsmouth Direct line). The railway tunnel which carries the line under the South Downs is visible from the recreation ground. There was a pedestrian crossing over the railway at this point which the trains used to 'hoot' for as a warning to those crossing the line, the crossing is now closed after a public enquiry (Dec 2016). There remains the path under the railway bridge from South Lane, which is one of two crossings from the centre of the village. The path leads to the walks around the disused chalk pits and is part of the Shipwrights Way long distance path. Although for centuries the village was deemed of more importance than neighbouring Petersfield, Buriton never obtained its own railway station (aside from Woodcroft Halt, built during World War II for naval personnel), because the gradient in the area was deemed too steep to allow a station to be constructed.

It formerly marked the Western end of the South Downs Way, which has now been extended to Winchester but several paths still join the village to the Way, and it retains its popularity with walkers. The Sussex Border Path also passes through South Harting which is close by. Buriton also lies adjacent to the Queen Elizabeth Country Park and since 2011 it has been within the South Downs National Park.

== Notable people ==
- William Lowth
