= RLN =

RLN may refer to:

- RLN, the National Rail code for Rowlands Castle railway station, Hampshire, England
- Recurrent laryngeal nerve, a branch of the vagus nerve that supplies all the intrinsic muscles of the larynx
