= Woodcroft Halt railway station =

Former railway station in England

Woodcroft Halt
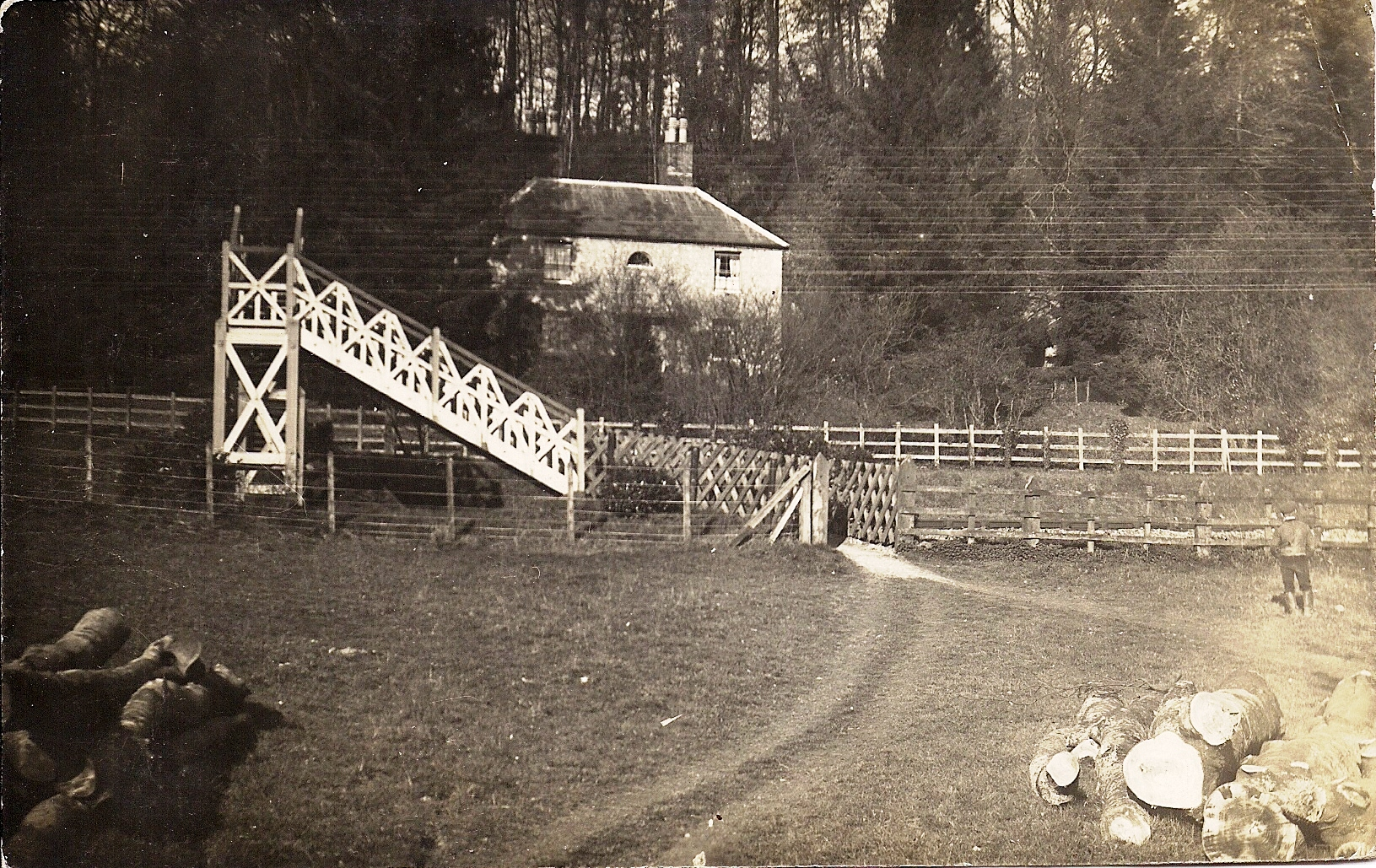
- The station site in 1914

General information
- Location: Chalton, East Hampshire; England
- Coordinates: 50.9395°N 0.9514°W
- Grid reference: SU737161
- Platforms: 2

Other information
- Status: Disused

History
- Original company: Southern Railway
- Post-grouping: Southern Railway

Key dates
- 4 October 1943: Station opened
- 1 October 1945: Station closed
Location

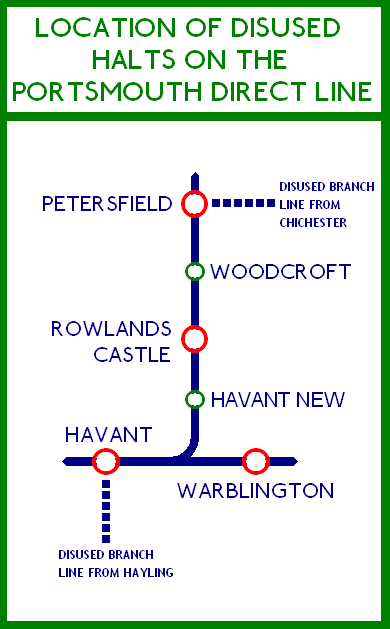

Woodcroft Halt railway station was a former railway halt located in the parish of Buriton between Rowlands Castle and Petersfield on the Portsmouth Direct Line.

== History ==
During World War II, in 1940, the Admiralty requisitioned Ditcham Park, a nearby country house for use as a convalescent home for sailors (the house is now a private school). The halt was built to serve Ditcham Park, principally for trains from the extensive naval facilities in Portsmouth about 20 km (12 mi) away. Woodcroft Halt, which was also known as Ditcham Park Halt, opened on 4 October 1943, and closed on 1 October 1945.

Because of its naval nature, it was featured on few maps, but some maps did mark it by a little tab without a name.

It was closed in 1945 and subsequently demolished; just a footbridge remains.

== Location ==
The halt was located 59 miles 72 chains (96.4 km) from Waterloo, at grid reference SU737161 which is now marked on the OS 1:25000 map as "Woodcroft Farm". The stations to either side were Petersfield and Rowlands Castle.

Preceding station	Historical railways	Following station
Petersfield; Line and station open	Southern Railway; Portsmouth Direct Line	Rowlands Castle; Line and station open
