= John Vaughan (naturalist) =

English cleric and botanist (1855–1922)

Rev. Canon John Vaughan
- Born: 1855
- Died: 10 July 1922 (aged 66–67)
- Spouse: Miss Whyley
- Scientific career
- Fields: Priest, naturalist

Rev. Canon John Vaughan (1855–1922) was an Anglican English cleric and naturalist who lived and worked in Hampshire. Vaughan is considered a distinguished botanist and writer on natural history. He is an author of at least ten books on ecclesiastical and natural history topics.

== Life ==
John Vaughan was the second son of Rev. Matthew Vaughan, the vicar of Finchingfield, Essex who also had a daughter Eliza Vaughan (1863–1949). He was educated at Felsted School and then Corpus Christi College, Cambridge, graduating in 1876. In 1891 he married the eldest daughter of the Rev. F Whyley, former vicar of his old parish at Alton. He died suddenly at his home on 10 July 1922 after being taken ill while celebrating communion at the cathedral, at the age of 66. He was survived by his widow and two daughters.

== Work ==
=== Career ===
After being ordained in 1878, Vaughan was appointed as a curate in the Parish of Stratton (Stratton with Baunton) in the Diocese and county of Gloucestershire. In 1881 he transferred to the Diocese of Winchester in the county of Hampshire, where he remained, taking the curacy of Alton, Hampshire, and then became vicar of Porchester under private patronage in 1890. In 1897 he was collated (appointed) to the vicarage of Langrish and in 1902 to Droxford. from the latter he was appointed an honorary canon of Winchester Cathedral in 1903, and then as residentiary canon in 1909.

=== Natural history ===
In addition to his ecclesiastical duties he maintained a herbarium and collected plants throughout Hampshire and Sussex, being regarded as the leading botanist of his county. (Note: Christopher Bell, cited in jot101 (2014))

While in Droxford, he became aware of the work of the local seventeenth century botanist, John Goodyer of Alton and Droxford, whose work had lain forgotten for 300 years. He published his findings in 1909, and is credited as the "discoverer" of Goodyer.

== Selected publications ==
The standard author abbreviation Vaughan is used to indicate this person as the author when citing a botanical name.

- A short history of Portchester Castle (1894)
- A short memoir of Mary Sumner: founder of the Mothers' Union
- Lighter studies of a country rector
- A mirror of the soul, short studies in the Psalter
- Winchester Cathedral close: its historical and literary associations
- The Wildflowers of Selborne, and other papers (1906) John Lane, London
- Vaughan, John (1909). "A forgotten botanist of the seventeenth century". Cornhill Magazine: 795–803.
- Winchester Cathedral, Its Monuments and Memorials (1919). London: Selwyn & Blount.
- The music of wild flowers (1920)

== Bibliography ==
- Gunther, Robert Theodore (1922). Early British botanists and their gardens, based on unpublished writings of Goodyer, Tradescant, and others. Oxford University Press.
- Anon. (15 August 1922). "Death of Canon Vaughan: A lover of nature and a great writer" (Obituary). The Straits Times. p. 2.
- "Canon John Vaughan, forgotten botanist". Jot101. 23 July 2014.
