= John Goodyer =

English botanist (1592-1664)

- Born: 1592; Alton, Hampshire, England
- Died: 1664 (aged 71–72)
- Resting place: St Mary's Church, Buriton
- Citizenship: British
- Spouse: Patience Crumpe
- Scientific career
- Fields: Botany
- Author abbrev. (botany): Goodyer

John Goodyer (1592–1664) was a botanist who lived in south-east Hampshire, England, all his life. He amassed a large collection of botanical texts which were bequeathed to Magdalen College, Oxford, and translated a number of classical texts into English.

== Life ==
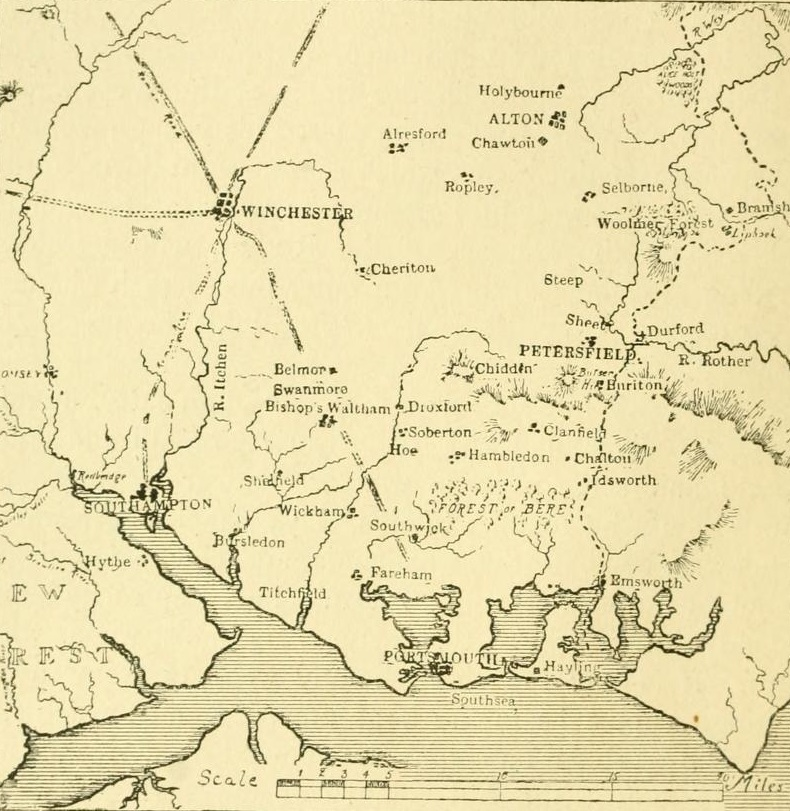
SE Hampshire, R Gunther 1922

John Goodyer was born in Alton, Hampshire, to Reginald Goodyer (c. 1578–1619) and Ann Goodyer. Reginald Goodyear was a local yeoman, and he and his wife had four children, John being the youngest. Learned in Greek and Latin, he evidently received a good education, possibly at the grammar school at Alton.

At that time he would have served an apprenticeship prior to his employment as an estate manager (steward). This would probably have been to William Yalden (d. 1644). Yalden was a land agent for estates owned by Magdalen College, Oxford near Petersfield, to the south, and whose second wife was John Goodyer's sister, Rose (d. 1652). When he first started work, Goodyer lived at nearby Buriton, close to his employer before moving further west to the village of Droxford, in the Meon Valley. In 1629 he moved back to the Buriton area, being given the lease of a neighbouring farm and house by the Bilsons at a nominal rate "in consideration of his faithful service" as the lease states.

Three years later, in November 1632, he married Patience Crumpe (b. c.1600), daughter of a London tailor, and moved to an area of Petersfield known as The Spain, where his substantial house still stands. The house was known as The Great House at that time and as Goodyers now. Such was Goodyer's reputation that in 1643 during the English Civil War (1642–1651), Ralph Hopton, one of the senior Royalist commanders, ordered troops "to defend and protect John Goodyer, his house, family, servants and estates". This order was found underneath the floorboards of the house.

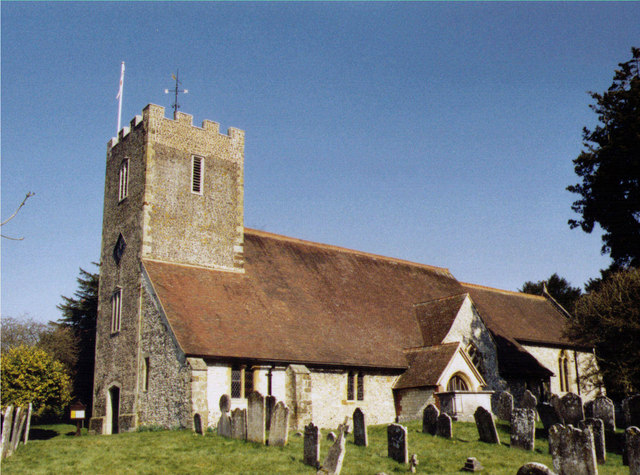
St Mary's Church, Buriton

After his wife died he moved to the hamlet of Weston, near Buriton, where he died in April or early May 1664 at the age of 71 and was buried in an unmarked grave near his wife's at St Mary's Church, Buriton. With no children to succeed him, the majority of his estate passed to his nephew, the Reverend Edmund Yalden, the only son of William and Rose Yalden.

== Work ==
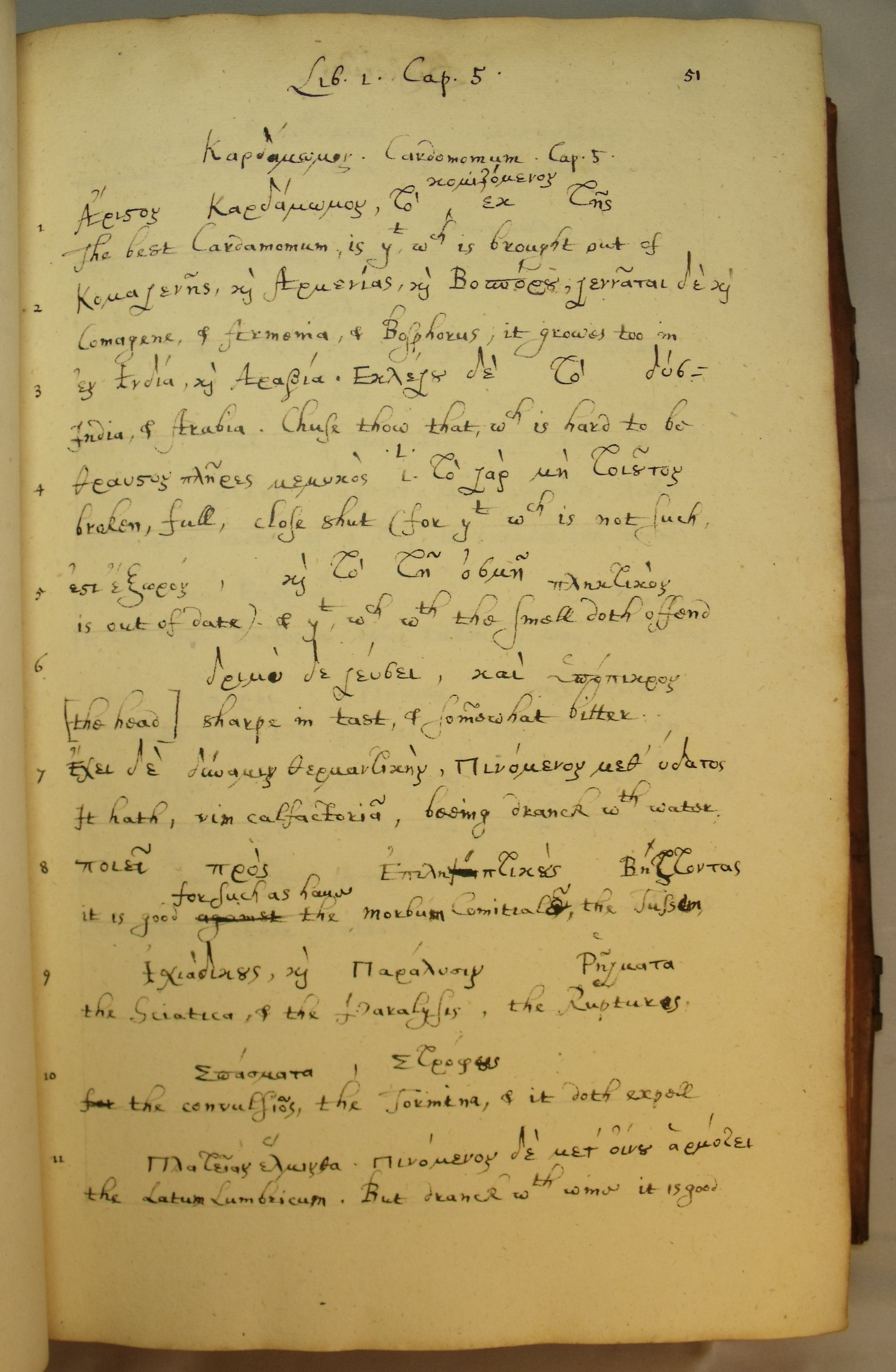
Page from Goodyer's Dioscorides

=== Employment ===
Goodyer started working for Sir Thomas Bilson MP (1592–c. 1647), Lord of the manor of Mapledurham, in the parish of Buriton, near Petersfield around 1616, an appointment probably obtained through the offices of Yalden. Bilson resided at West Mapledurham Manor House, (demolished 1829) and Goodyer initially leased a nearby house from him. Although a servant, he remained very close to the Bilson family, three of Sir Thomas' sons being close friends for life and being remembered in his will. He also held a position as the agent for two Bishops of Winchester: Thomas Bilson (father of Sir Thomas Bilson) and later, Lancelot Andrewes.

=== Botanical fieldwork ===
Goodyer's work involved spending much time in the countryside, and he took an interest in the plants he observed and how they were named. His intellectual interests prompted him to acquire botanical texts and to cultivate the company of apothecaries, who at that time possessed much of the knowledge of plants and their properties. Amongst these was John Parkinson in London whom he visited in 1616. His notes start from this date, reach a peak of activity by 1621, and are few following 1633. They show that the area he explored and recorded covered from Bristol, to Weymouth, Wellingborough, and Romney Marsh. His findings were mainly published by Thomas Johnson and his contemporaries, rather than by himself, leading to his work being largely forgotten after his death. They suggest his intention was to produce a guide to the English flora, matching his observations with the texts of the continental authors he had studied, but he was never able to complete this.

Goodyer added many plants to the British flora. He is credited with clarifying the identities of the British elms, and for discovering an unusual elm endemic to the Hampshire coast between Lymington and Christchurch named for him as Goodyer's elm; this was believed by the botanist Ronald Melville to be a form of the Cornish elm. He is also believed to have introduced the Jerusalem artichoke to English cuisine. Although not formally trained in medicine, like many herbalists of his time, he had a small practice using herbal remedies, skills he passed on to his nephew, Rev. Edmund Yalden.

=== Scholarly activity ===
One of his most important contributions was his work with botanist Thomas Johnson in producing a revised and corrected edition of John Gerard's Herbal (1597), arguably the greatest English herbal of its time, in 1633. Johnson called him his "onely assistant". He also translated a Latin version of Dioscorides's work, De Materia Medica, and Theophrastus' Historia Plantarum (1623).

== Legacy ==
Memorials

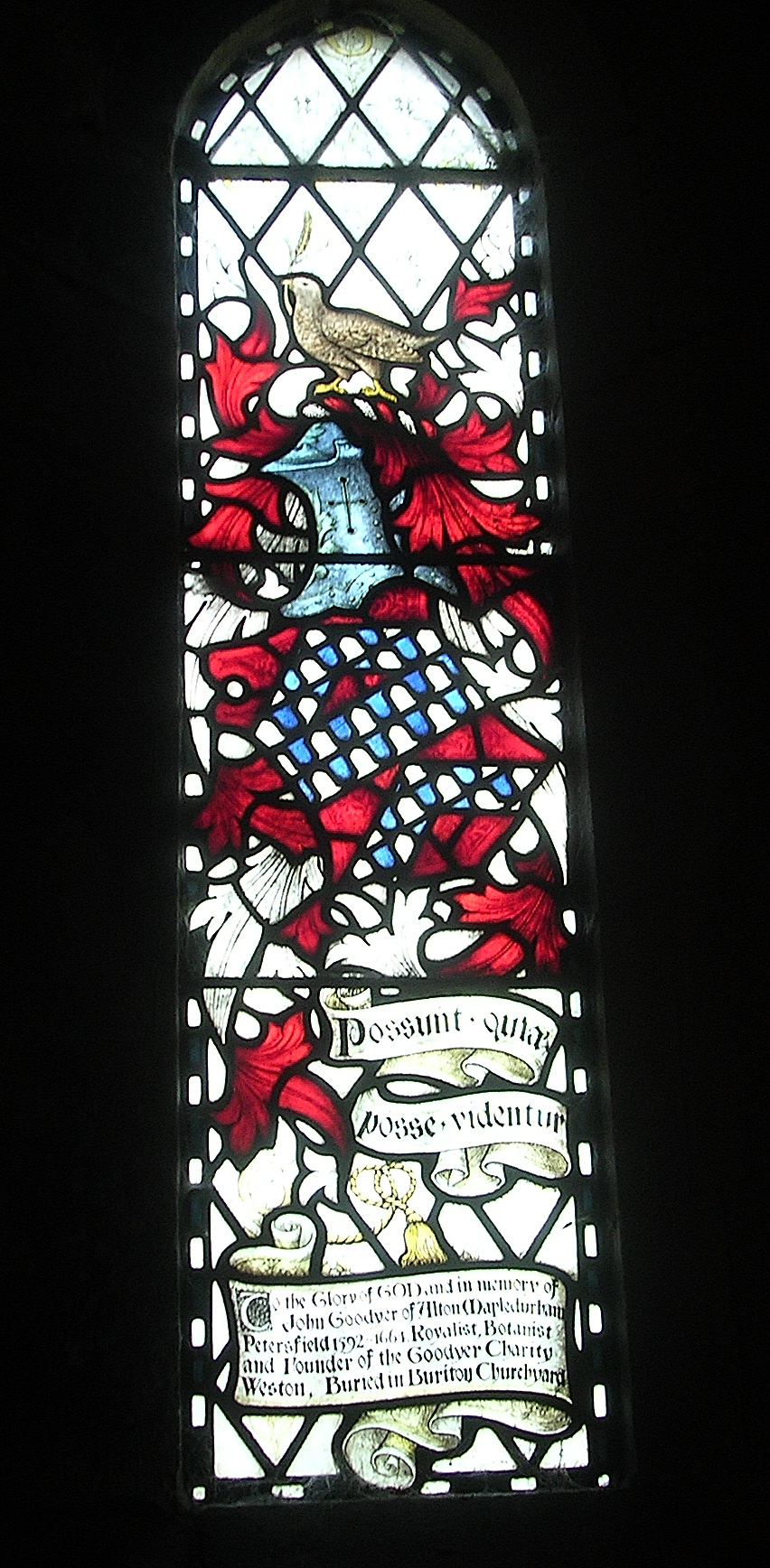
Figure 1. Window in St Mary's Buriton

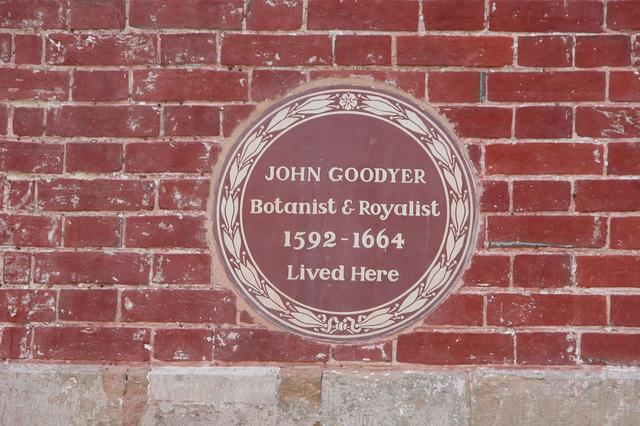
Figure 2. Plaque on John Goodyer's house in Petersfield

Proceeds from the residue of his estate were used to establish the John Goodyer Charity to help the poor of Weston, a charity that still exists today. He bequeathed his papers and extensive collection of 239 printed works to Magdalen College, Oxford in 1664, through his connection to the Yaldens. The Yaldens had managed the college's local estates, while two of their sons attended the college and Edmund was also a fellow there.

In his time Goodyer was well regarded, the contemporary botanist William Coles calling him "the ablest Herbarist now living in England" in 1657. But because of the lack of publications during his lifetime he remained largely forgotten and unrecognized after his death. He is mentioned in neither the Dictionary of National Biography (1890) nor the first Flora of Hampshire (1883). His rediscovery dates from about 1910, first by the charity he created and then by botanists. Canon John Vaughan is credited with discovering Goodyer and had called him the "forgotten Botanist" in 1909. (Note: Canon John Vaughan, A forgotten botanist of the seventeenth century, Cornhill Magazine 1909 pp. 795–803, cited by Gunther, 1922) In 1912 J.W. White described how Goodyer contributed to the work of many other botanists and made their work better known: "every writer of the period owned help from Goodyer in one way or another". (Note: Bristol Flora 1912, cited by Gunther 1922) He became recognised as one of the earliest amateur British botanists, and in 1922 Gunther at Magdalen College assembled his papers and published an account of his life and work.

Around this time a stained glass window (Figure 1) was installed in St Mary's Church, Buriton as a memorial to him, after funds were raised by public description. It includes the Goodyer coat of arms and motto with an inscription stating:

To the Glory of GOD and in memory of John Goodyer of Alton Mapledurham Petersfield 1592–1664. Royalist, Botanist, and founder of the Goodyer Charity Weston. Buried in Buriton Churchyard

His house in Petersfield bears a commemorative plaque (Figure 2). In recognition of his industry, Goodyera, a genus of small terrestrial European orchids, was named after him by Robert Brown. The second Flora of Hampshire (1996) was dedicated to his memory. The 350th anniversary of his death was celebrated at Magdalen College in 2014.

=== Descendants ===
Being childless, Goodyer had no direct descendants. However, Anne, the youngest daughter of William and Rose Yalden married a Petersfield lawyer named John Worlidge. Of their ten children, the eldest, John (1640–1700) wrote many books on agriculture, including Systema agriculturae or The Mystery of Husbandry Discovered (1669), Vinetum Britannicum or A Treatise of Cider (1676), Apiarum or A Discourse of Bees (1676), and Systema horti-culturae or The Art of Gardening (1677).

== Bibliography ==
=== Books ===
- Brewis, Anne; Bowman, Paul; Rose, Francis (1996). The Flora of Hampshire. Harley Books. ISBN 9780946589531.
- Gunther, Robert Theodore (1922). Early British botanists and their gardens, based on unpublished writings of Goodyer, Tradescant, and others. Oxford University Press.
- Hoeniger, F.D.; Hoeniger, J.F.M. (1969). The Growth of Natural History in Stuart England: From Gerard to the Royal Society. Charlottesville: Folger Books. ISBN 978-0-918016-14-0.
- Pavord, Anna (2005). The naming of names: the search for order in the world of plants. New York: Bloomsbury. ISBN 978-1-59691-071-3.
- Raven, Charles E. (1947). English naturalists from Neckham to Ray: a study of the making if the modern world. Cambridge: Cambridge University Press. ISBN 9781108016346.
- White, James Walter (1912). The Bristol Flora: Being an Account of All the Flowering Plants, Ferns, and Their Allies that Have at Any Time Been Found in the District of Bristol Coal-fields. Bristol: John Wright and Sons Ltd.
- Willes, Margaret (2011). The making of the English gardener. Plants, Books and Inspiration, 1560-1660. New Haven: Yale University Press. ISBN 9780300163827.

=== Articles ===
- Allen, D. E. (2004). "Goodyer, John (c.1592–1664)". Oxford Dictionary of National Biography (online ed.). Oxford University Press. doi:10.1093/ref:odnb/57486. (Subscription, Wikipedia Library access or UK public library membership required.)
- Vaughan, John (1909). "A forgotten botanist of the seventeenth century". Cornhill Magazine: 795–803.

=== Websites ===
- "The John Goodyer Collection of Botanical Books". Treasure of the month. Oxford: Magdalen College. 30 September 2014. Archived from the original on 13 January 2020.
- "John Goodyer". Petersfield in the 17th C. Hampshire County Council. Archived from the original on 8 August 2014.
- Buriton Heritage Bank (2001). "Information Sheet No. 5: Local luminaries – famous people from the area: John Goodyer". Archived from the original on 19 July 2011.
- IHR (2016). "The History of Parliament". Institute of Historical Research.
- "The National Archives (U. K.)".
- SHNH (19 July 2014). "Naturalists' Libraries: 350th Anniversary of John Goodyer (1592–1664), 17th-century botanist". Events. Society for the History of Natural History.
- Shaw, Tony (23 April 2012). "John Goodyer and John Worlidge in Petersfield, Hampshire: Petersfield Plaques #4 & #5".
- "ChaseGray Family Trees". 2016.
