= Ditcham Park School =

School in Hampshire, UK

Ditcham Park School is a co-educational, independent school in the civil parish of Buriton, near Petersfield, in the English county of Hampshire.

== Location ==
The school and its grounds are on the southern spur of Oakham Hill (202 m), one of the highest points on the South Downs. It is some 2 kilometres south-southwest of the village of Buriton and 2 kilometres northeast of the hamlet of Chalton. The premises was previously owned by Douai School (closed in 1999) and housed its Junior School until 1975.

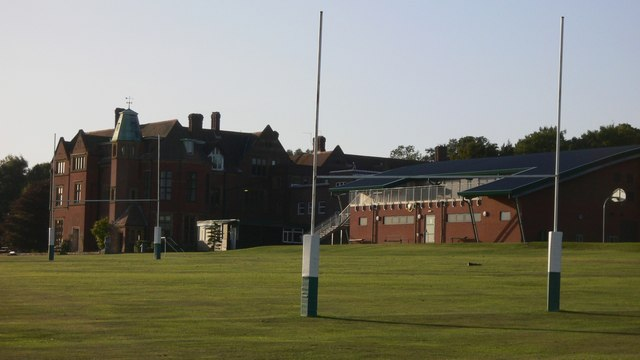
Ditcham Park School

== Notable former pupils ==
- Tamsin Egerton, actor
- Zoe French, model
- Richard Harwood, cellist

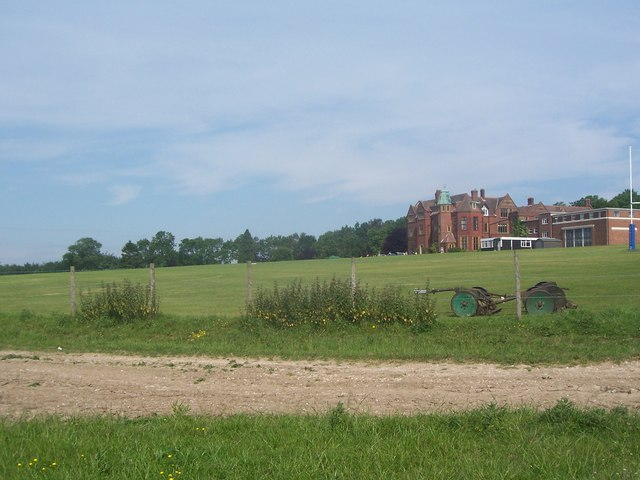
Ditcham Park School

== See also ==
- Private schools
- Hampshire
- Churcher's College
