= Queen Elizabeth Country Park =

Country park in Hampshire, England

Coordinates: 50.96593°N 0.97606°W

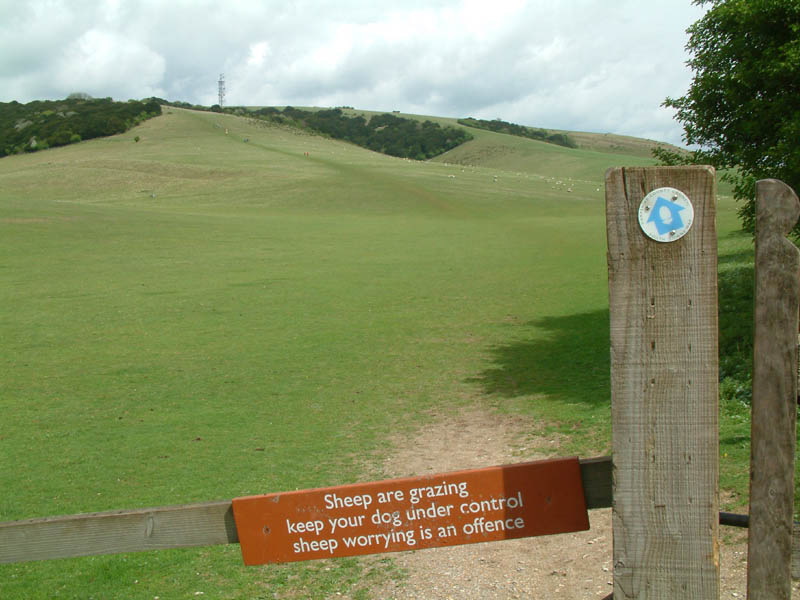
View from the bottom of Butser Hill

Queen Elizabeth Country Park is a large country park situated on the South Downs in southern England. It is located on the A3 road three miles south of Petersfield, Hampshire and lies within the South Downs National Park.

The park contains 1,400 acres (6 km^{2}) of open access woodland and downland within the East Hampshire Area of Outstanding Natural Beauty, including Butser Hill (886 ft), the highest point on the South Downs, and War Down (801 ft). The woodland was mostly planted in the 1930s; it consists mainly of beech trees. Several Long-distance footpaths run through the park including Staunton Way, Hangers Way and the South Downs Way bridleway. On a clear day the Isle of Wight can be seen from the top of Butser Hill.

The park also contains several waymarked and graded mountain biking trails. These are designed, built and maintained by volunteers.

The Queen Elizabeth Country Park parkrun takes place within the park each Saturday.

To the east of the forest, south of the village of Buriton lies the wooded hill of Head Down (205 m), which "is an area that caters for clubs that require land with privacy for outdoor recreational activities, such as archery or off-road vehicles."

Every July the Queen Elizabeth Country Park is the start point for Oxfam's biggest annual fundraising event, Trailwalker UK.

The Queen Elizabeth Country Park and the Queen Elizabeth National Park in Uganda are twinned in a project of "cultural exchange, mutual support and has its main emphasis on supporting Conservation through working closely with and empowering local communities".
