= Petersfield railway station =

Railway station in Hampshire, England

Petersfield
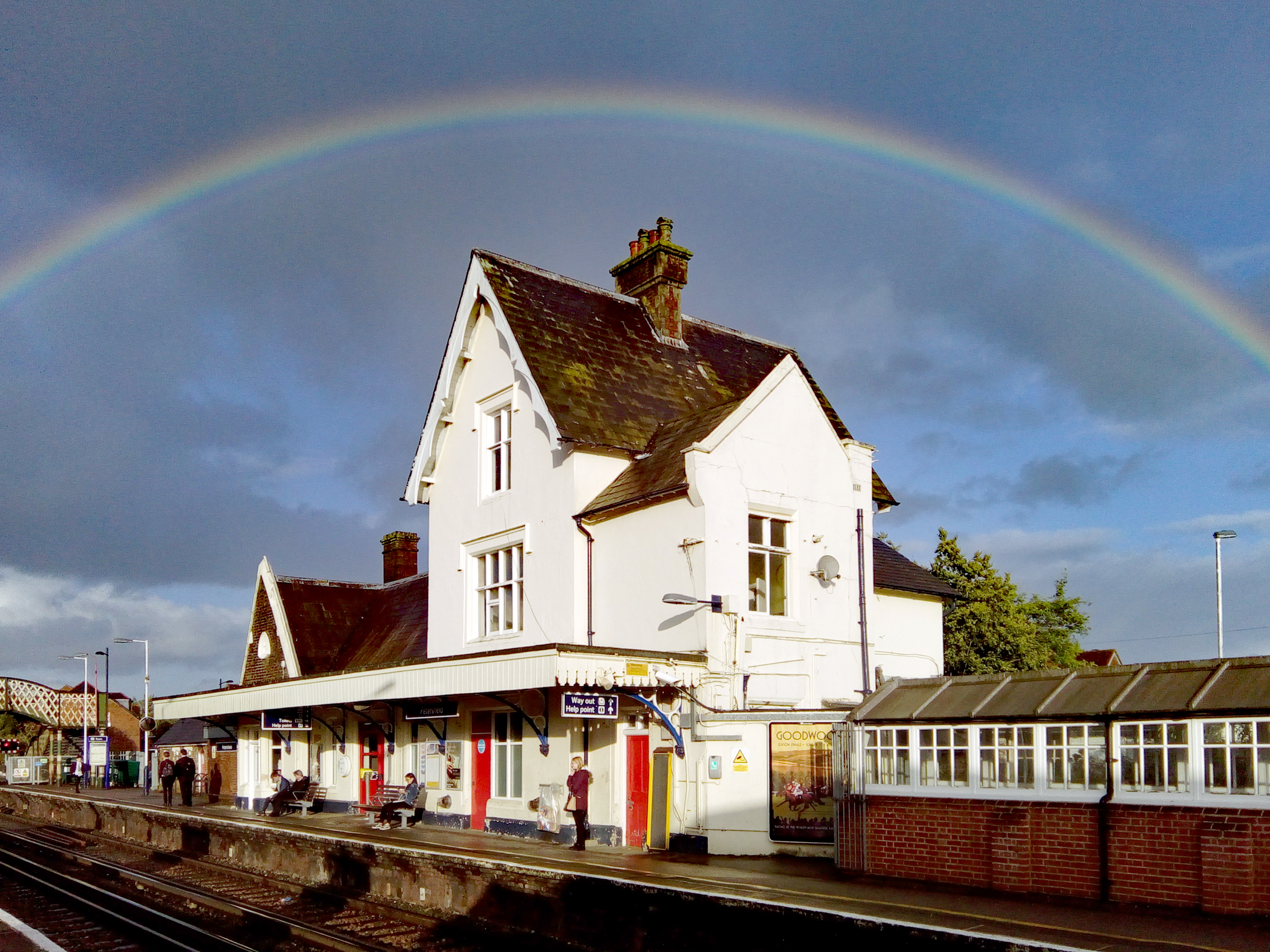
- The main station building

General information
- Location: Petersfield, East Hampshire; England
- Coordinates: 51°00′25″N 0°56′28″W
- Grid reference: SU743235
- Managed by: South Western Railway
- Platforms: 2 (was 4)

Other information
- Station code: PTR
- Classification: DfT category C2

History
- Opened: 1859

Passengers
- 2020/21: ▼0.371 million
- Interchange: ▼2,145
- 2021/22: ▲0.903 million
- Interchange: ▲6,000
- 2022/23: ▲1.038 million
- Interchange: ▲7,646
- 2023/24: ▲1.119 million
- Interchange: ▲9,595
- 2024/25: ▲1.221 million
- Interchange: ▼6,732
Location
Notes
- Passenger statistics from the Office of Rail and Road

Petersfield railway station serves the market town of Petersfield, Hampshire, England. It is on the Portsmouth Direct line, 54 miles 71 chains (88.3 km) down the line from London Waterloo via Woking.

== The station ==
The station has two tracks, and two platforms, although in the past had a third platform branching into the coal yard situated adjacent to the station and a fourth platform on the north side of the level crossing serving the branch to Midhurst closed in 1955. The main buildings date back to the opening of the line in 1859 and are of a "town" type, larger than other wayside stations on the route but identical to Godalming. The signal box, situated by the level crossing at the north-east end of the station, is an LSWR Type 3a box and a Grade II listed building.

== Services ==
All services at Petersfield are operated by South Western Railway using Class 444 and 450 EMUs.

The typical off-peak service in trains per hour is:

- 2 tph to London Waterloo via Guildford (1 semi-fast, 1 stopping)
- 2 tph to Portsmouth Harbour (1 semi-fast, 1 all stations)

The station is also served by a single evening service to Southampton Central.

Preceding station	National Rail	Following station
Liss or Haslemere	South Western Railway Portsmouth Direct Line	Rowlands Castle or Havant
	Historical railways	
Liss Line and station open	Southern Railway Portsmouth Direct Line	Woodcroft Halt Line open, station closed
	Disused railways	
Terminus	Midhurst Railways	Rogate

== Gallery ==
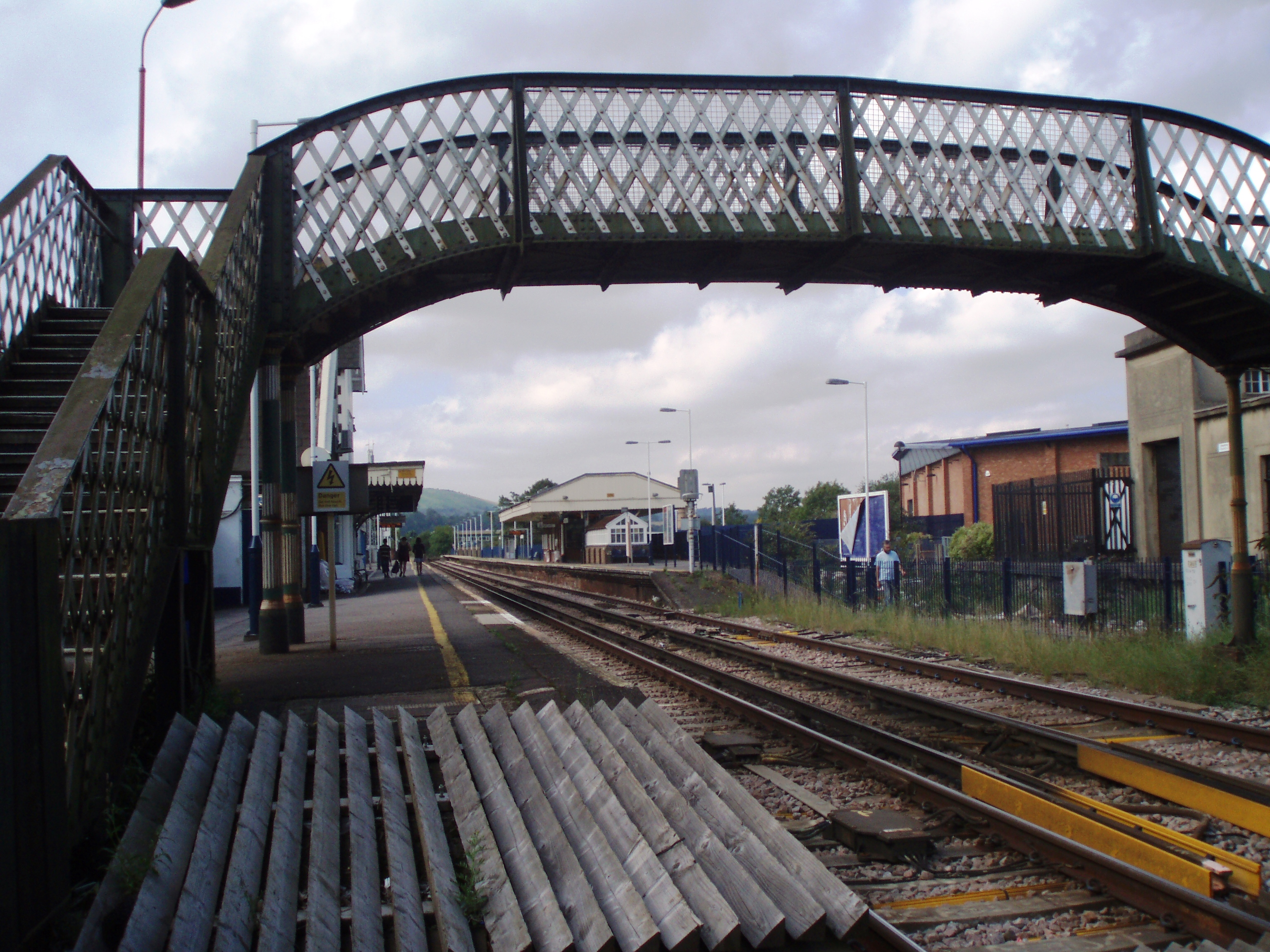
Taken from "Wilmotts"

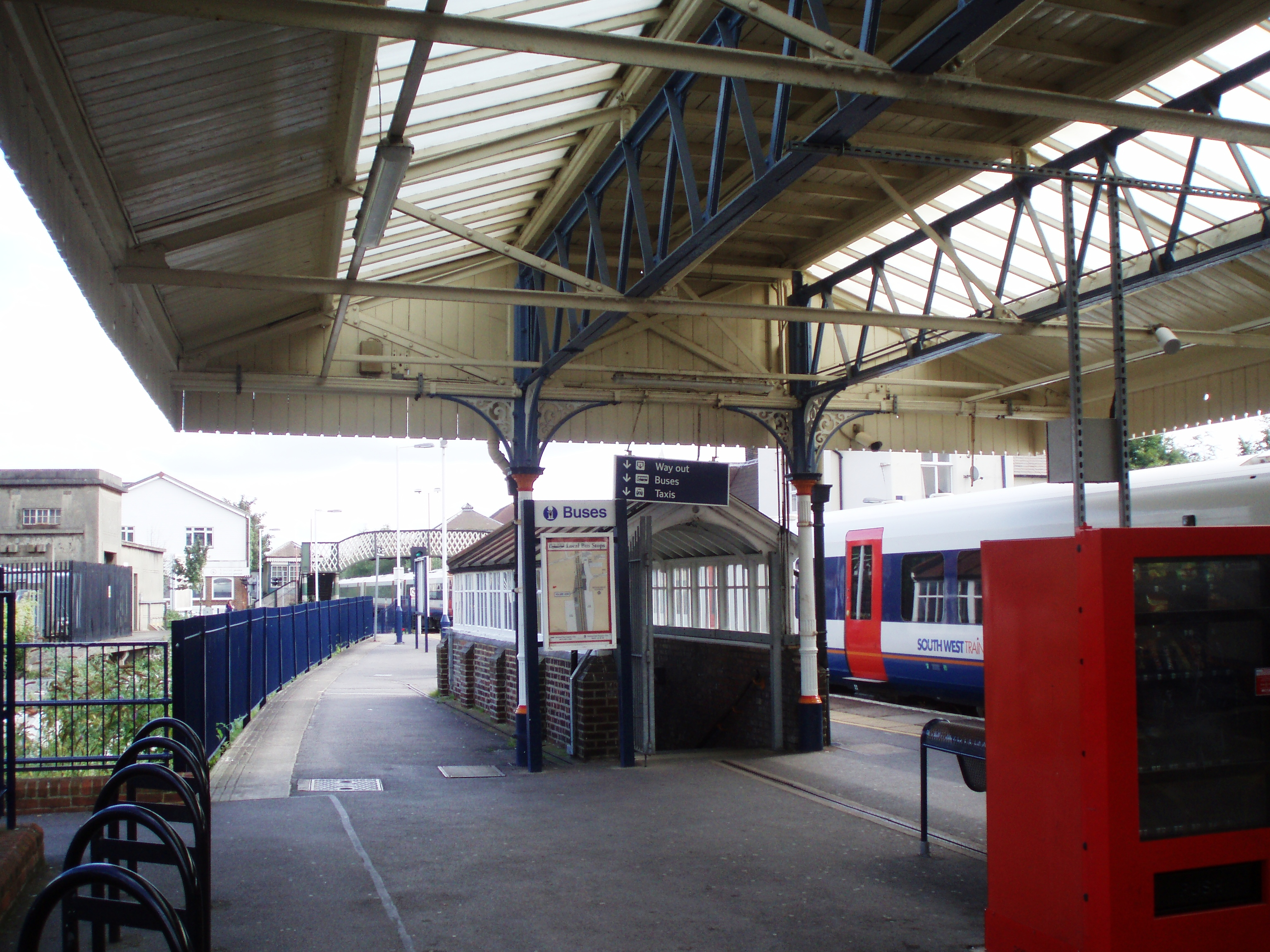
Up platform

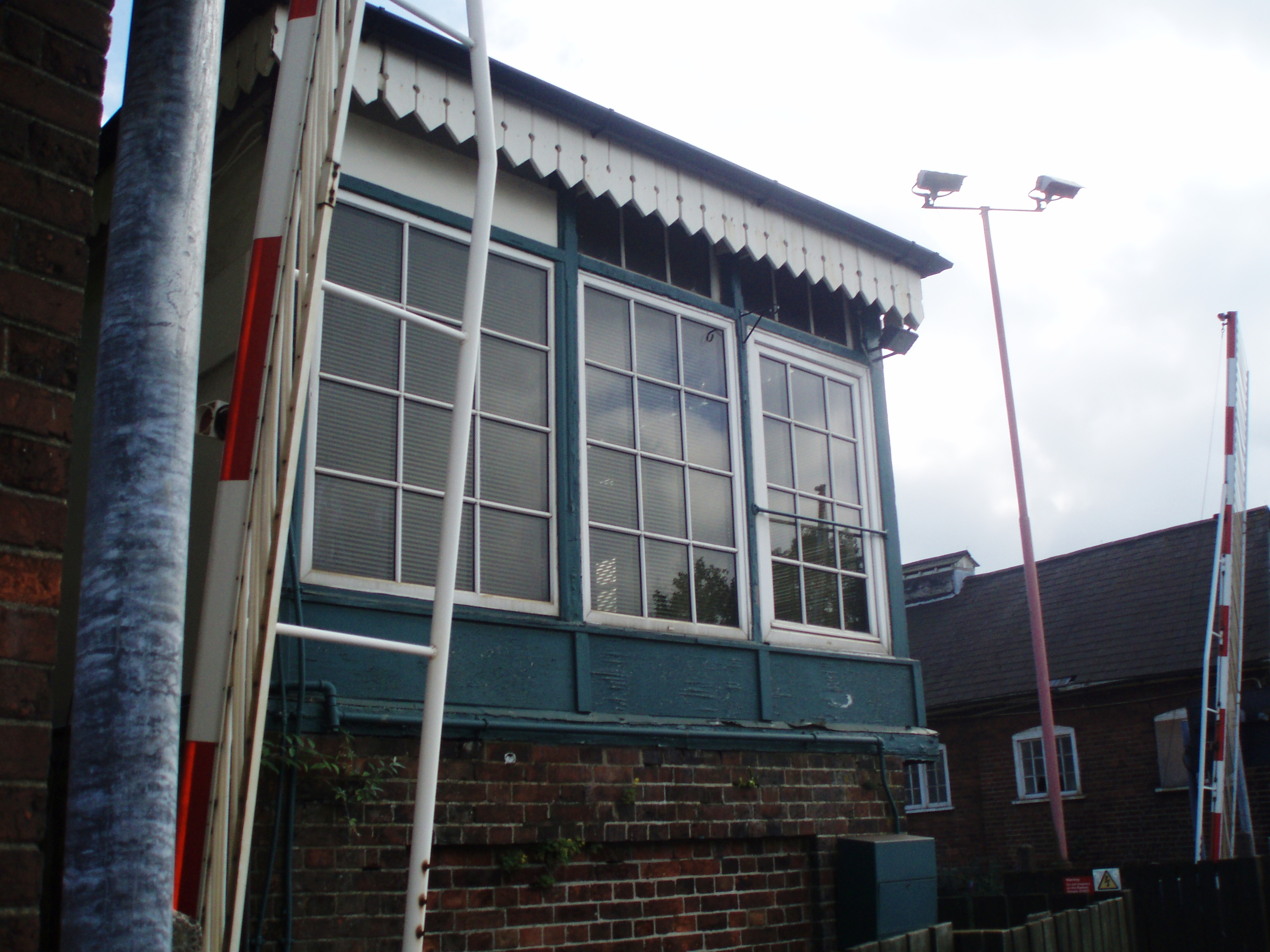
Signal box
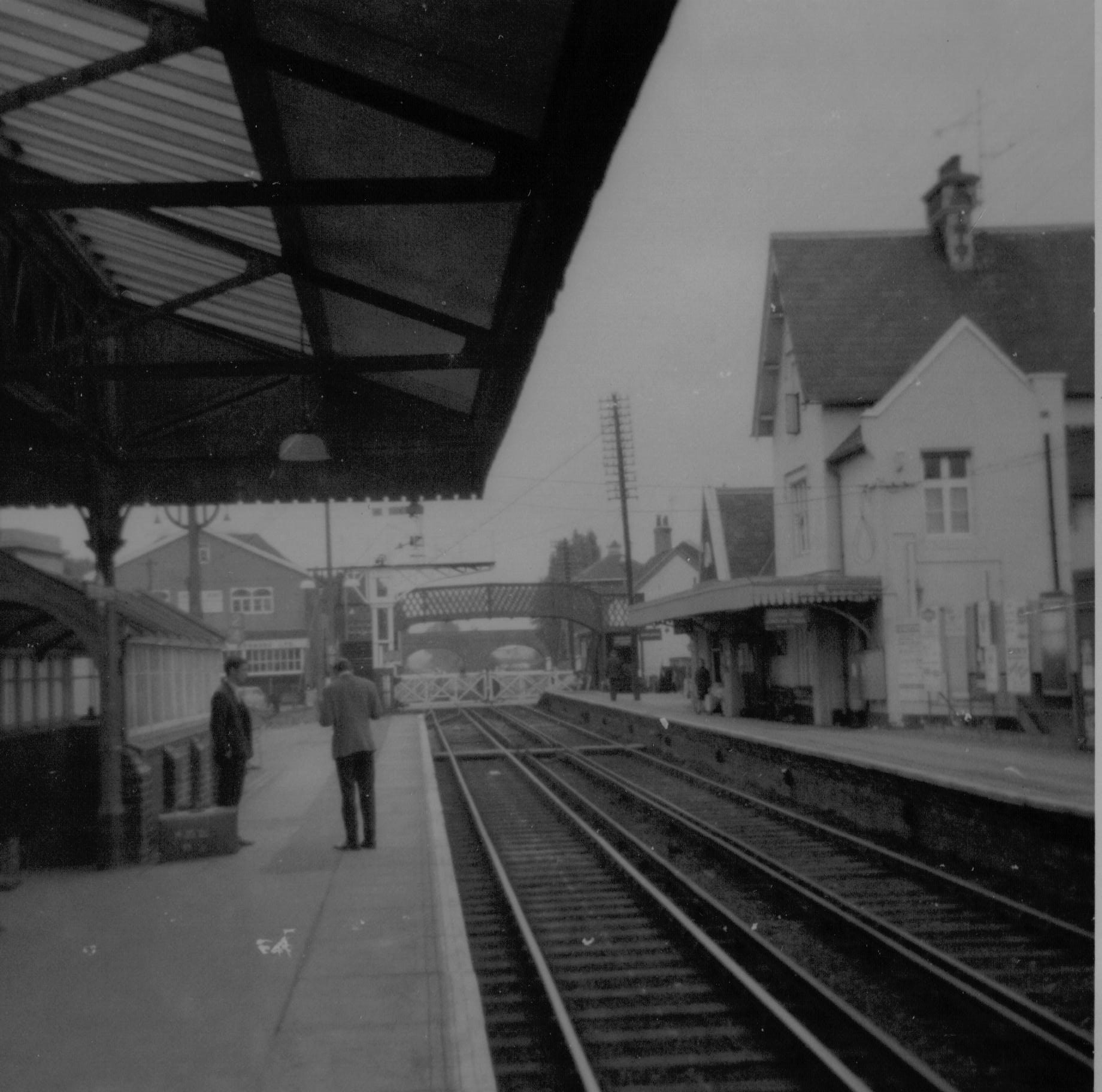
Petersfield in 1971.

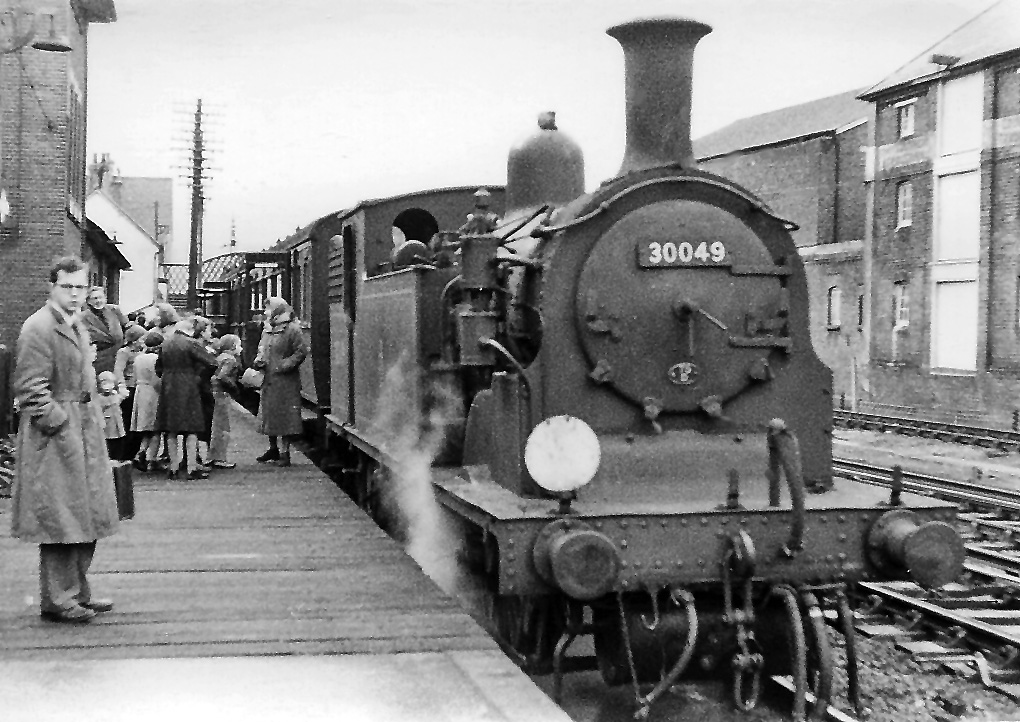
Auto-train from Pulborough on the Last Day of the branch in 1955

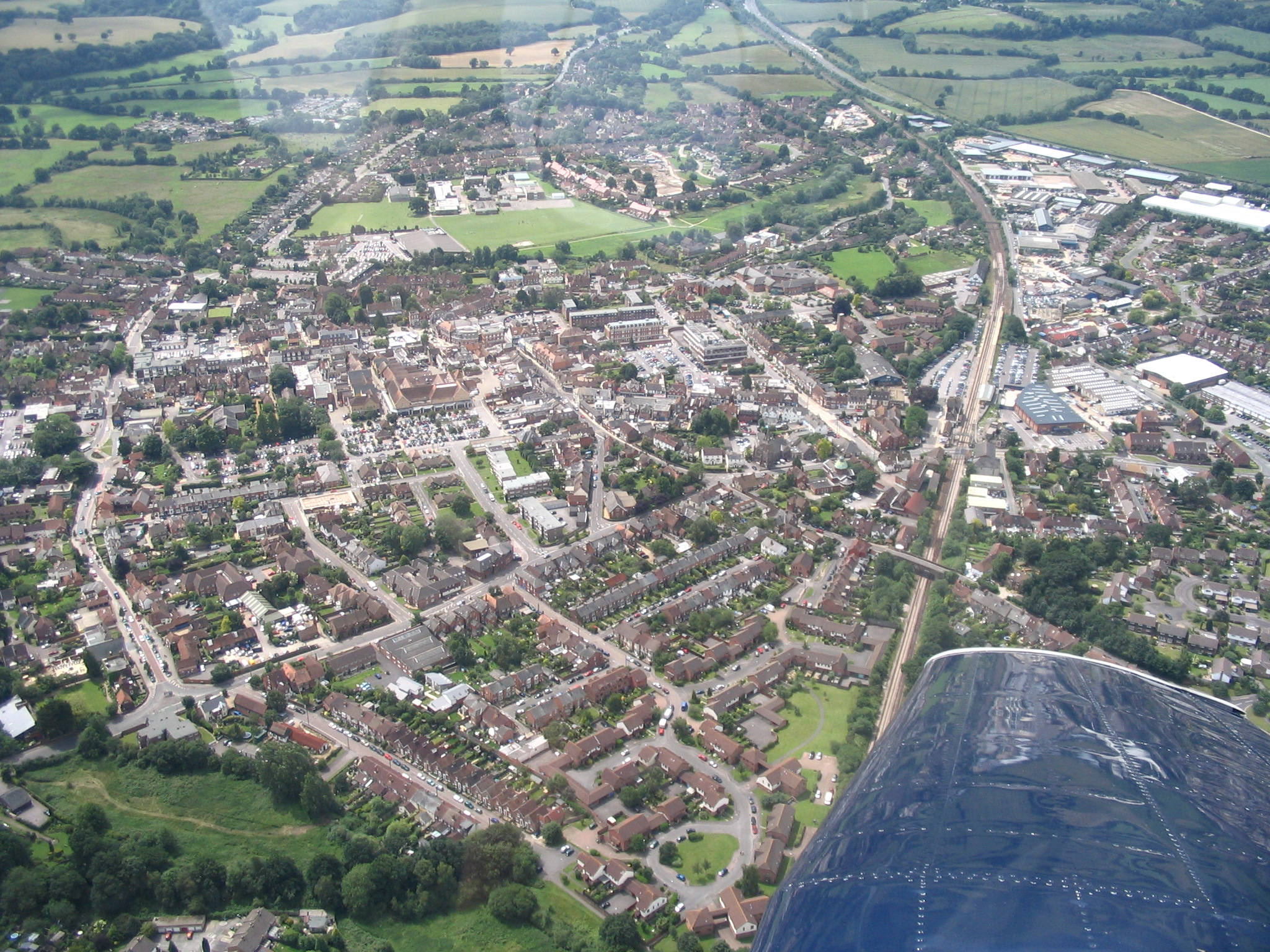
Aerial view of Petersfield showing the railway (right) and station (centre right)
