= Rowlands Castle railway station =

Railway station in Hampshire, England

Rowlands Castle
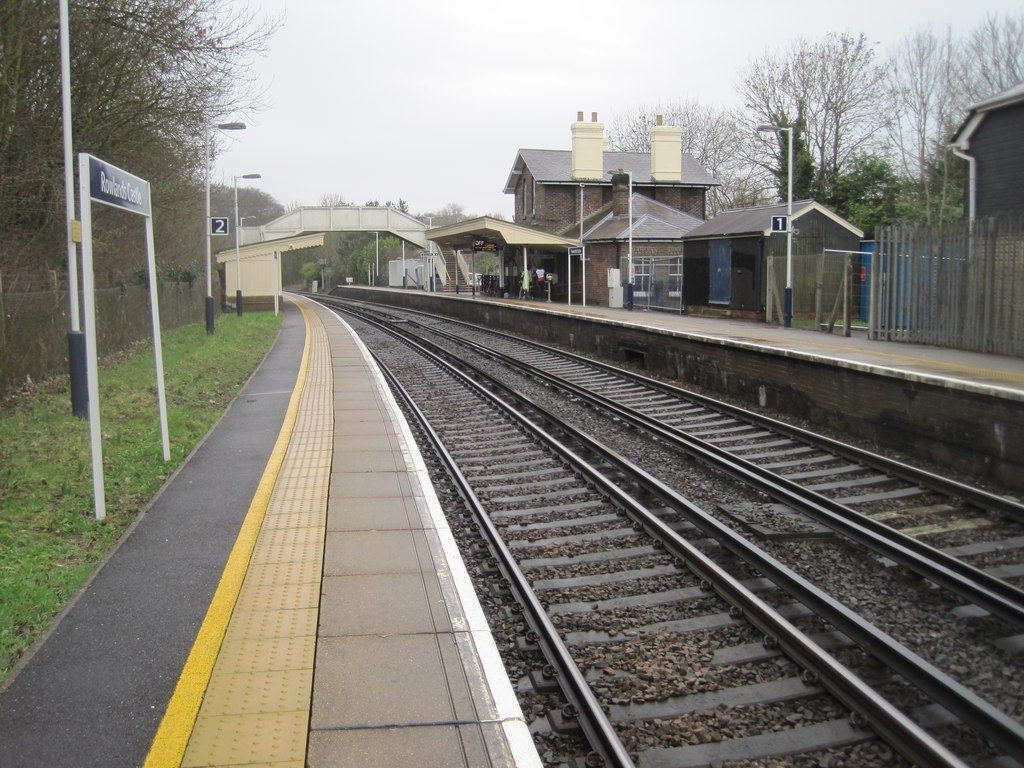

General information
- Location: Rowland's Castle, East Hampshire; England
- Coordinates: 50°53′31″N 0°57′25″W
- Grid reference: SU734108
- Managed by: South Western Railway
- Platforms: 2

Other information
- Station code: RLN
- Classification: DfT category E

History
- Opened: 1 January 1859; 166 years ago

Passengers
- 2020/21: ▼47,426
- 2021/22: ▲96,954
- 2022/23: ▲0.113 million
- 2023/24: ▲0.121 million
- 2024/25: ▲0.133 million
Location
Notes
- Passenger statistics from the Office of Rail and Road

Rowlands Castle railway station serves the village of Rowland's Castle, Hampshire, England. It is located on the Portsmouth Direct Line, 63 miles 18 chains (101.8 km) down the line from London Waterloo via Woking.

== History ==
The main station building, dating to 1859, was designed by William Tite and is Grade II listed.

The station was once one of three between Petersfield and Havant, but is the only one to have enjoyed a regular service. Havant New, to the south, was a temporary station built during an inter-company dispute - the Battle of Havant; Woodcroft Halt, to the north, was open for a few years round World War 2, mainly for service personnel.

Formerly there were goods and coal sidings trailing off the Up Line at the Petersfield end of the station. There was only one crossover between the two running lines, which meant that goods trains that arrived from the Petersfield direction (usually on the 0450 Goods Woking to Rowland's Castle) had to "set-back" into the headshunt and "fly shunt" (i.e. run off) wagons into the sidings rather than propelling them. This was a skilled movement and not normally permitted by the Rule Book. There was also a siding trailing off the up line, Havant side of the station, serving a brickworks adjacent to the remains of the Castle.

== Services ==
The station has two tracks, and two platforms, and the standard service is hourly to both Portsmouth and Waterloo. All services are operated by South Western Railway using Class 444 and 450 EMUs.

The typical off-peak service in trains per hour is:

- 1 tph to London Waterloo via Guildford
- 1 tph to Portsmouth & Southsea

During the peak hours, there are additional services to London as well as services to Portsmouth Harbour. There is also one late evening service to Southampton Central.

The station is staffed from 6:30 - 9:30 in the morning. At all other times, people are served by ticket machines.

Preceding station	National Rail	Following station
Petersfield	South Western Railway Portsmouth Direct Line	Havant
	Historical railways	
Woodcroft Halt Line open, station closed	Southern Railway Portsmouth Direct Line	Havant Line and station open

== Gallery ==
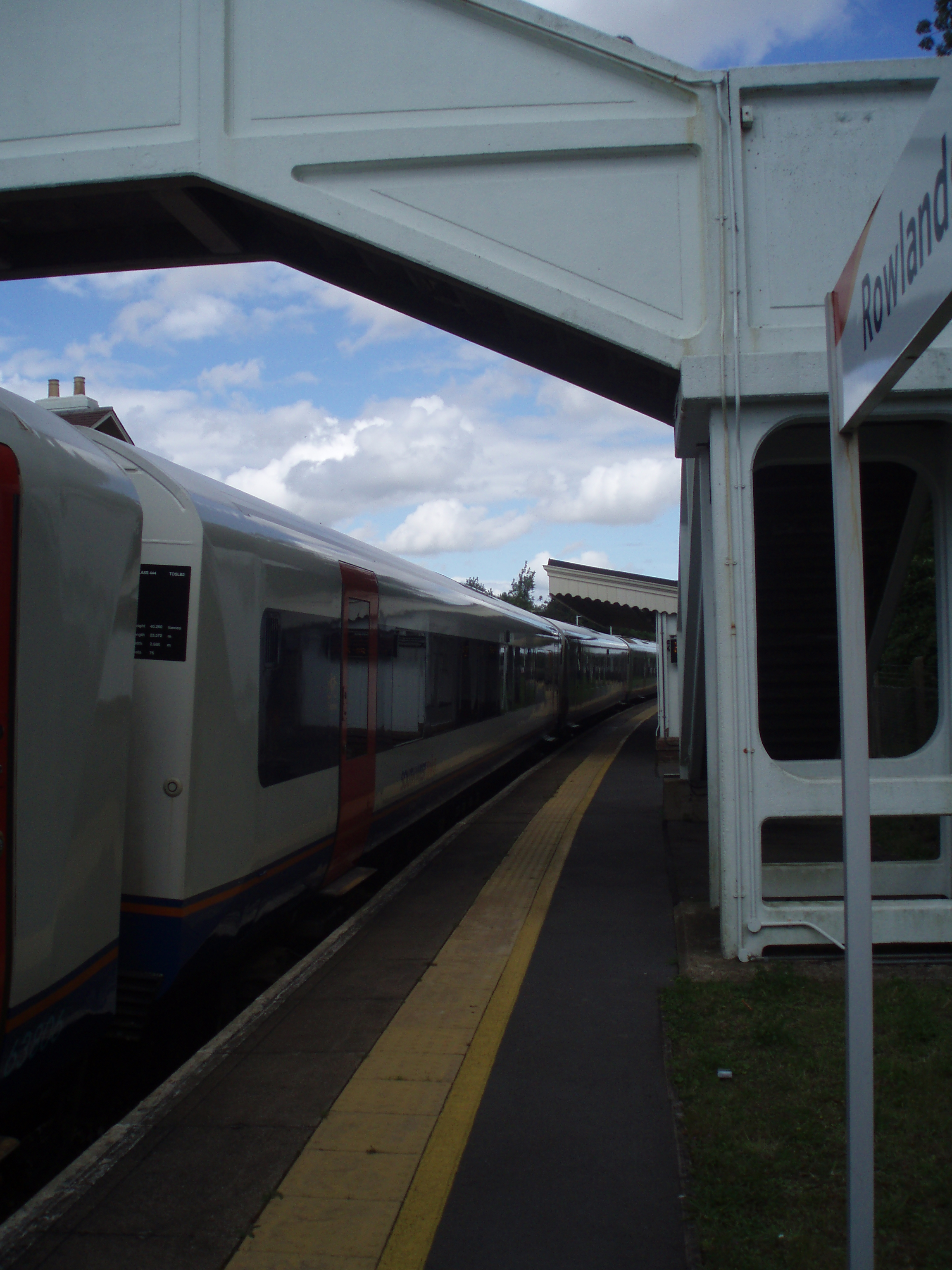

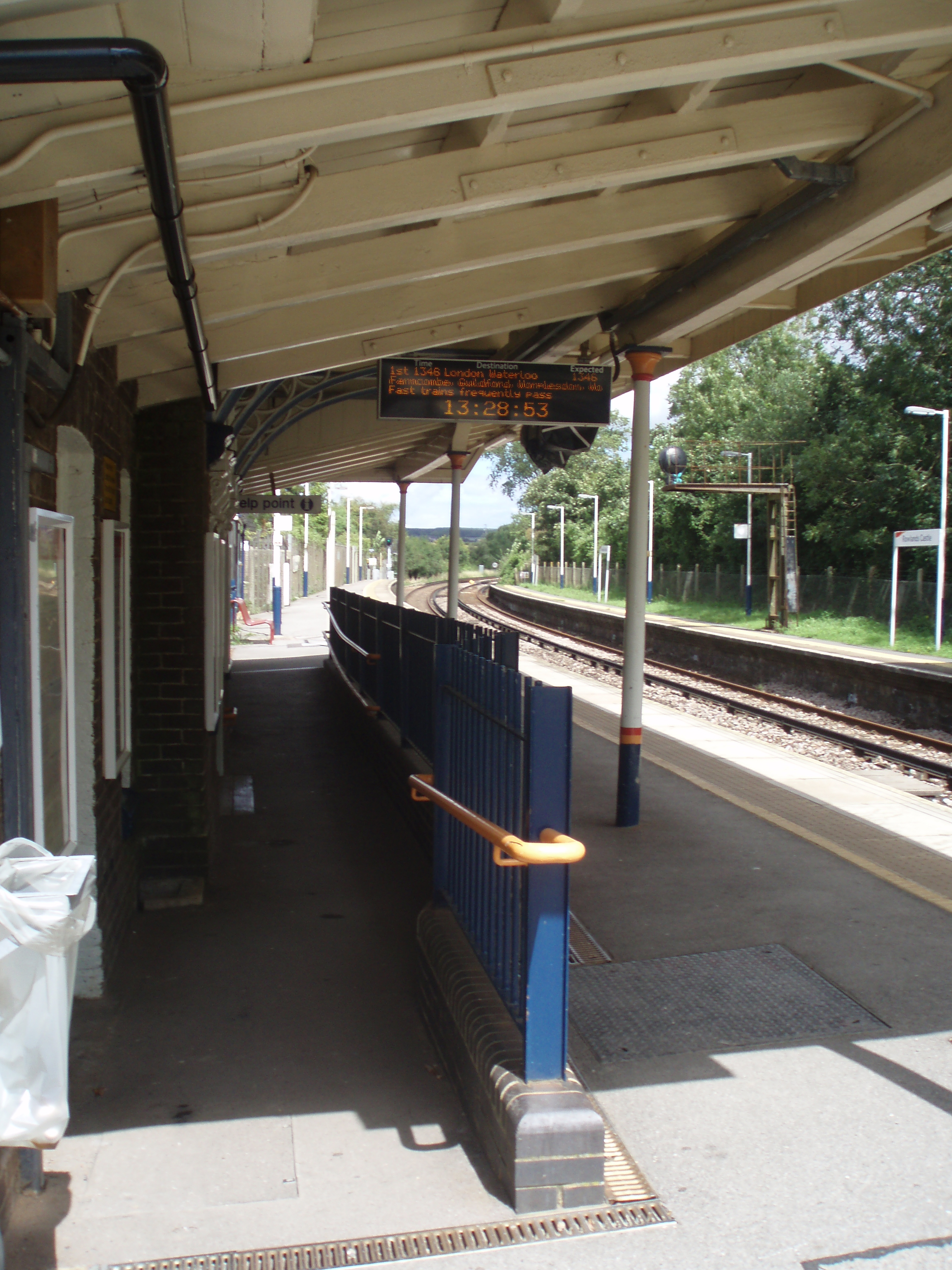

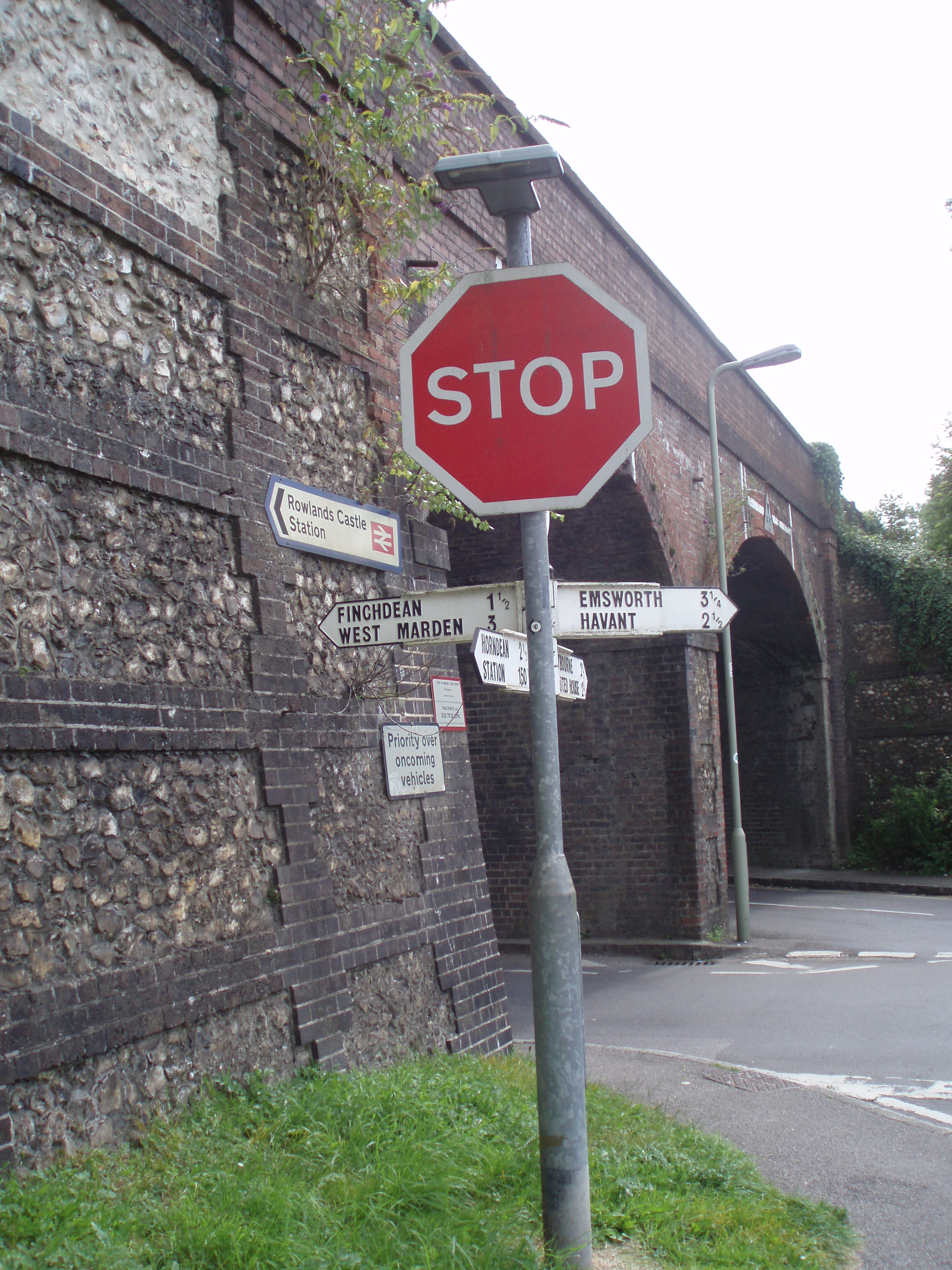

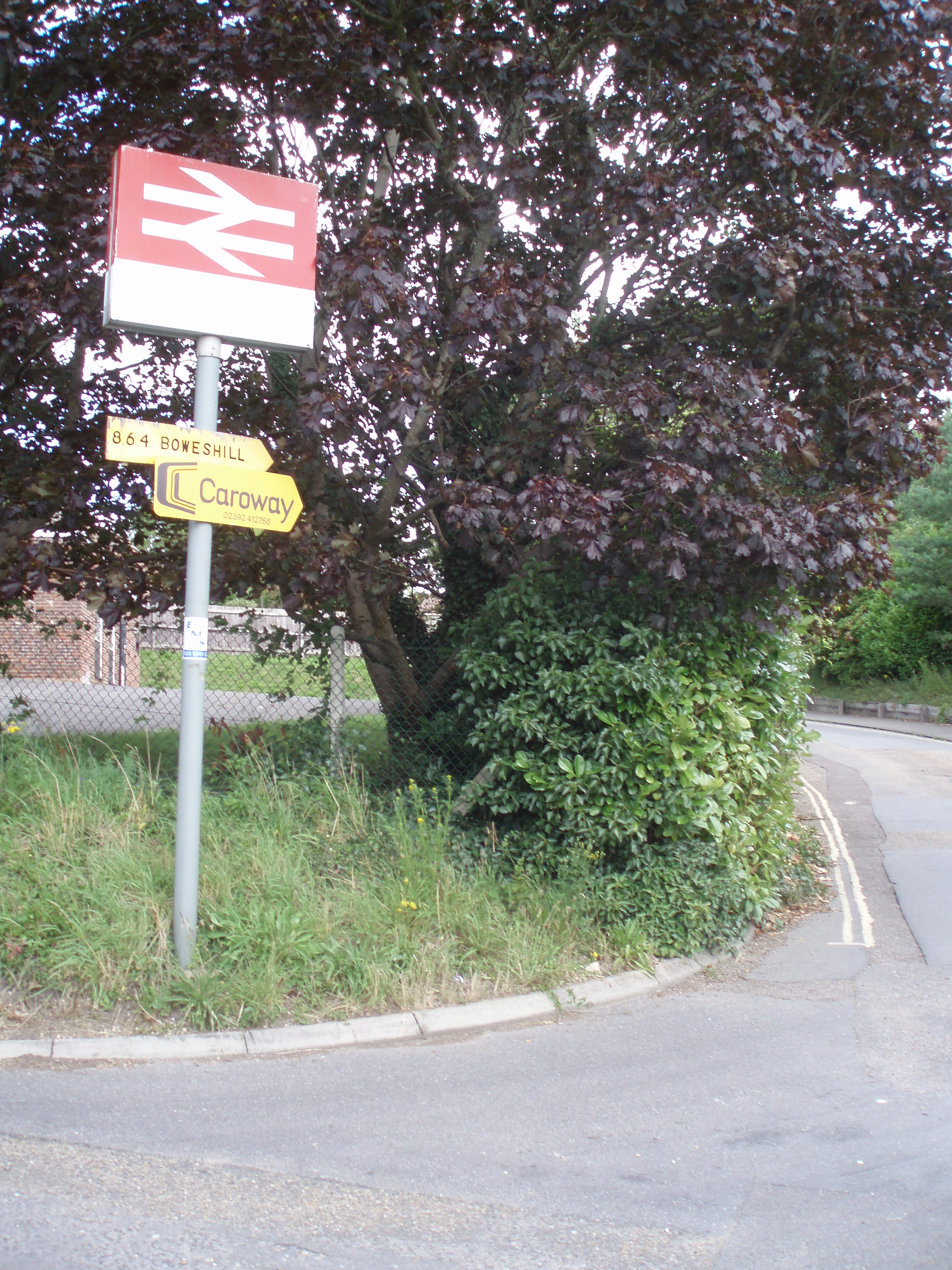

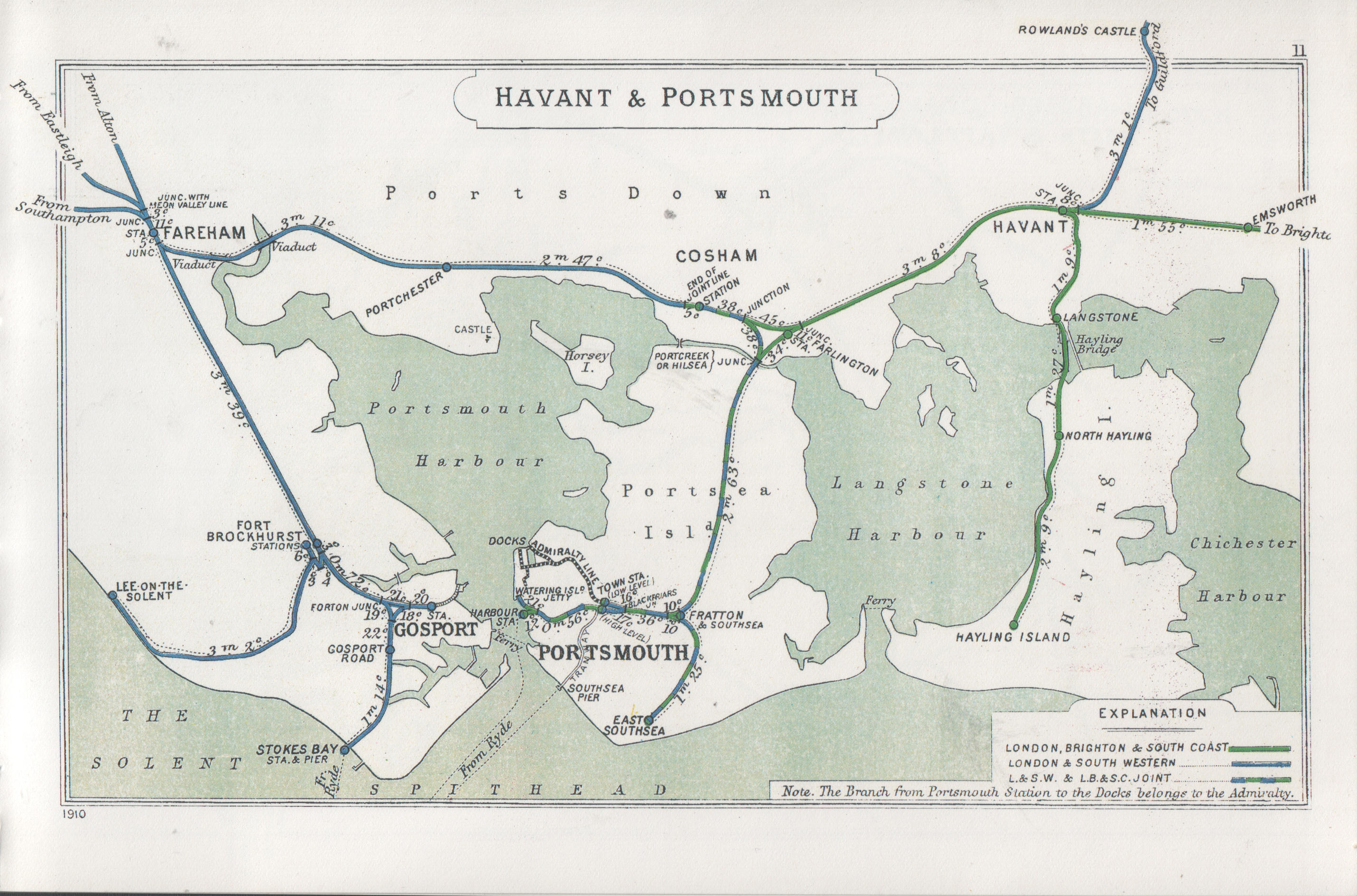
A 1910 Railway Clearing House map of lines around Rowlands Castle railway station
