= Head Down, Hampshire =

Hill in Hampshire, England

Head Down
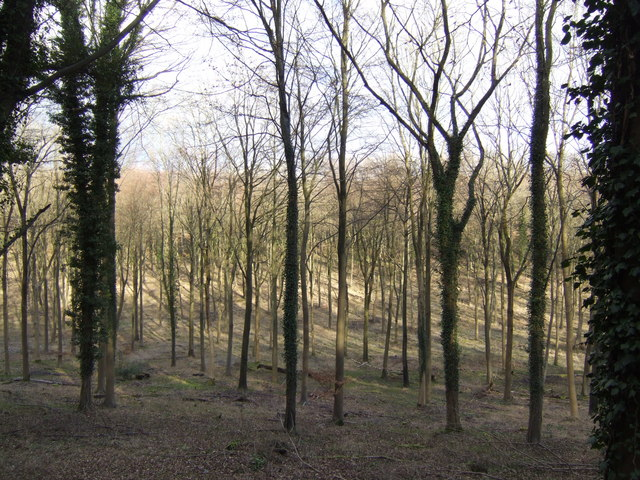
- The southern section of the Head Down Plantation that covers the crown of the hill

Highest point
- Elevation: 205 m (673 ft)
- Prominence: 68 m (223 ft)
- Parent peak: Butser Hill
- Coordinates: 50°58′03″N 0°57′15″W

Geography
- Location: Hampshire, England
- Parent range: South Downs
- OS grid: SU735191
- Topo map: OS Landranger

Head Down is one of the highest points in the county of Hampshire, England, and in the South Downs, rising to 205 metres (673 ft) above sea level.

The tree-covered Head Down rises about 1 kilometre south of the village of Buriton in Hampshire. It lies within the eastern part of the Queen Elizabeth Country Park and is described as "an area that caters for clubs that require land with privacy for outdoor recreational activities, such as archery or off-road vehicles."
