= War Down =

Hill in Hampshire, England

Coordinates: 50.9730°N 0.9674°W

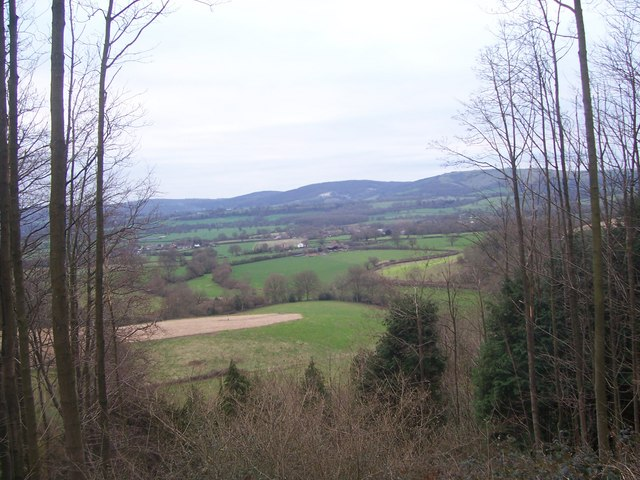
- View across farmland at Stroud towards War Down and Butser Hill

Highest point
- Elevation: 244 m (801 ft)
- Prominence: 90 m (300 ft)
- Parent peak: Butser Hill
- Listing: sub-HuMP

Geography
- Location: Hampshire, England
- Parent range: South Downs
- OS grid: SU726198
- Topo map: OS Landranger 197; Explorer 120.

At 244 metres (801 ft), War Down is one of the highest hills in the county of Hampshire, England and the second highest summit in the Hampshire part of the South Downs. Just 1 kilometre to the northwest is the South Downs' highest point at Butser Hill (270 m).

Much of the hill is covered in mixed forest and there is a trig point at 244 metres. There is a forest track over the summit. It is located in the Queen Elizabeth Country Park.
